= Brazilian cuisine =

Culinary traditions of Brazil

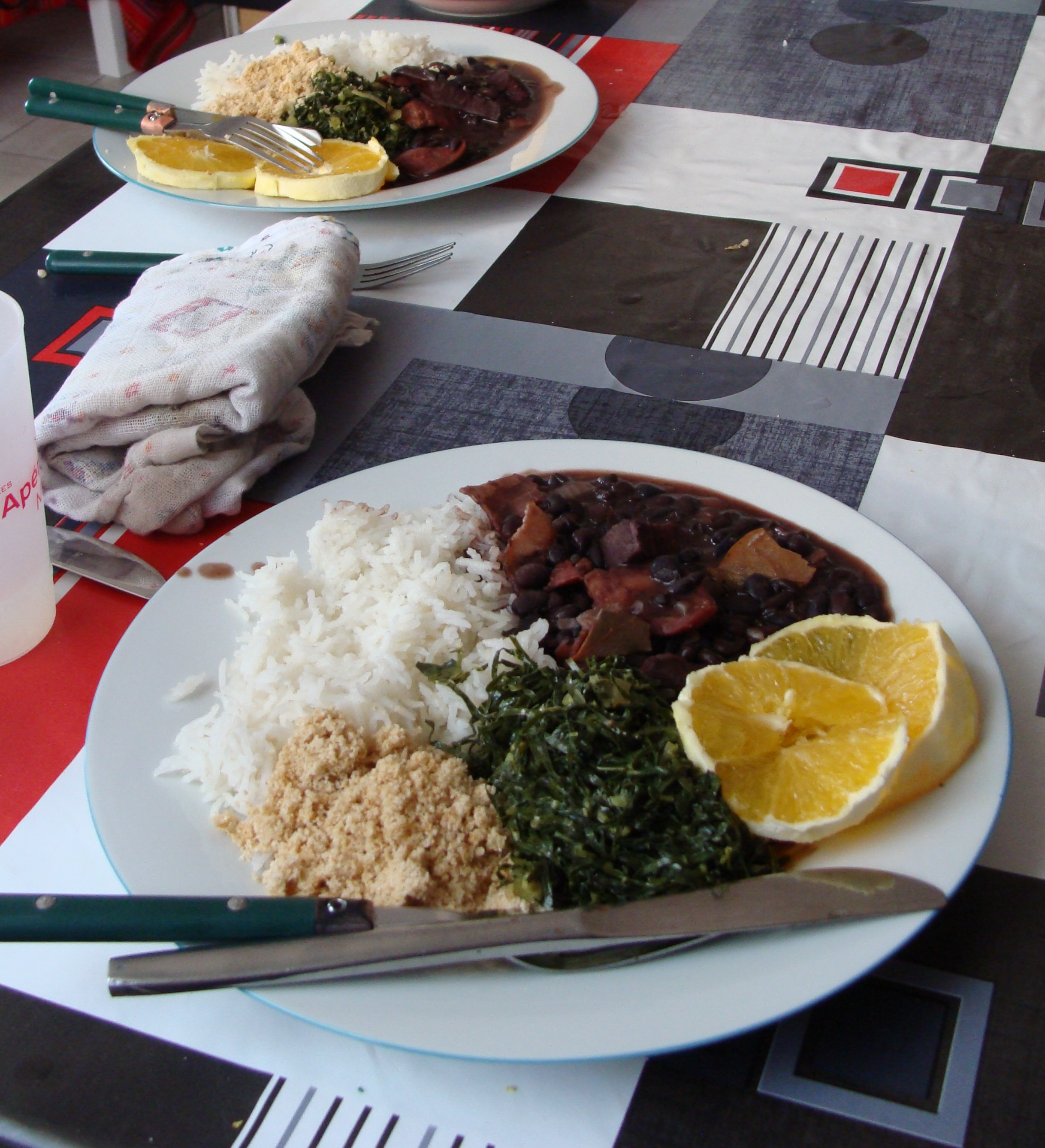
Feijoada, one of the best-known Brazilian dishes, is usually served with rice, farofa, collard greens, and orange

Brazilian cuisine is the set of cooking practices and traditions of Brazil, and is characterized by African, European, Amerindian and Asian (Levantine, Japanese, and most recently, Chinese) influences. It varies greatly by region, reflecting the country's mix of native and immigrant populations, and its continental size as well. This has created a national cuisine marked by the preservation of regional differences.

Ingredients first used by native peoples in Brazil include cashews, cassava, pineapple, guaraná, açaí, cumaru, and tucupi. From there, the many waves of immigrants brought some of their typical dishes, replacing missing ingredients with local equivalents. For instance, the European immigrants (primarily from Portugal, Italy, Spain, Germany, Netherlands, Poland, and Ukraine), were accustomed to a wheat-based diet, and introduced wine, leafy vegetables, and dairy products into Brazilian cuisine. When potatoes were not available, they discovered how to use the native sweet manioc as a replacement. Enslaved Africans also had a role in developing Brazilian cuisine, especially in the coastal states. The foreign influence extended to later migratory waves; Japanese immigrants brought most of the food items that Brazilians associate with Asian cuisine today, and introduced large-scale aviaries well into the 20th century.

The most visible regional cuisines belong to the states of Minas Gerais and Bahia. Minas Gerais cuisine has European influence in delicacies and dairy products such as feijão tropeiro, pão de queijo and Minas cheese, and Bahian cuisine due to the presence of African delicacies such as Acarajé, Abará and vatapá.

Root vegetables such as manioc (locally known as mandioca, aipim or macaxeira, among other names), yams, and fruit like açaí, cupuaçu, mango, papaya, guava, orange, passion fruit, pineapple, and hog plum are among the local ingredients used in cooking.

Some typical dishes are feijoada, considered the country's national dish, and regional foods such as beiju, feijão tropeiro, vatapá, moqueca capixaba, polenta (from Italian cuisine) and acarajé (from African cuisine). There is also caruru, which consists of okra, onion, dried shrimp, and toasted nuts (peanuts or cashews), cooked with palm oil until a spread-like consistency is reached; moqueca baiana, consisting of slow-cooked fish in palm oil and coconut milk, tomatoes, bell peppers, onions, garlic and topped with cilantro.

The national beverage is coffee, while cachaça is Brazil's native liquor. Cachaça is distilled from fermented sugar cane must, and is the main ingredient in the national cocktail, caipirinha.

Pães de queijo and salgadinhos such as pastéis, coxinhas, risoles and quibe are common finger food items.

== Cuisine by Brazilian region ==
=== Regional cuisines ===
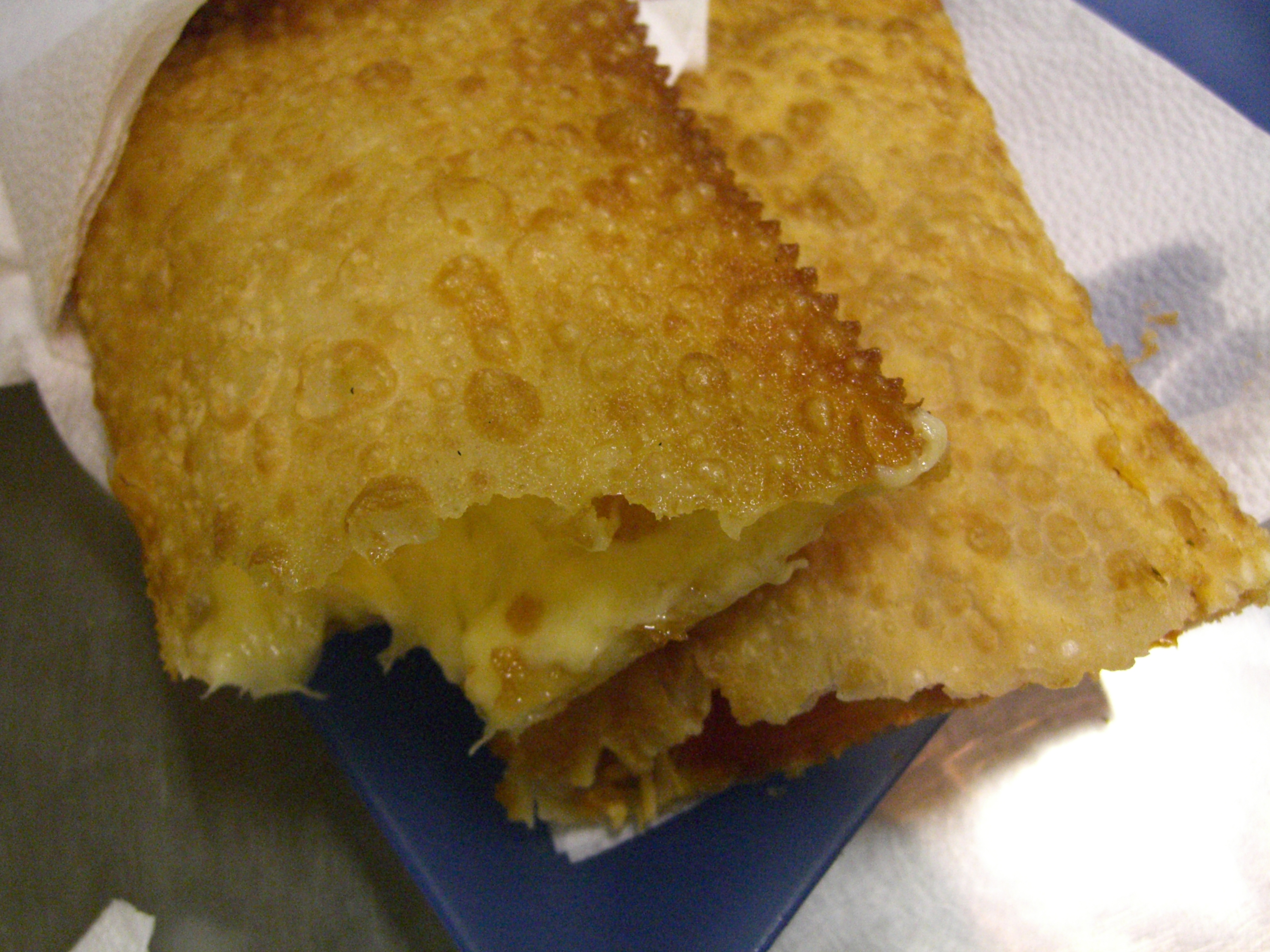
Pastel

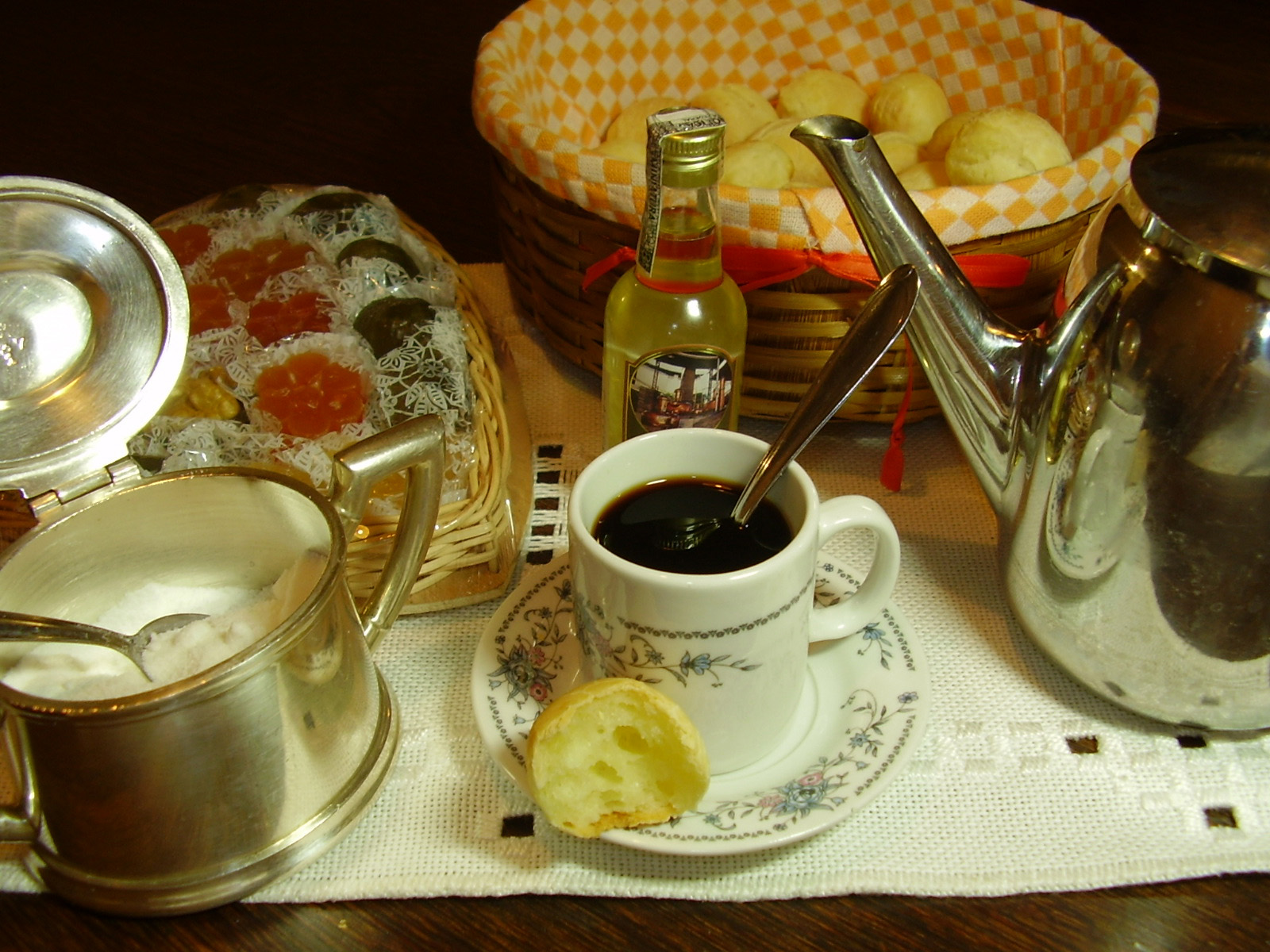
Pão de queijo, coffee and a small bottle of cachaça

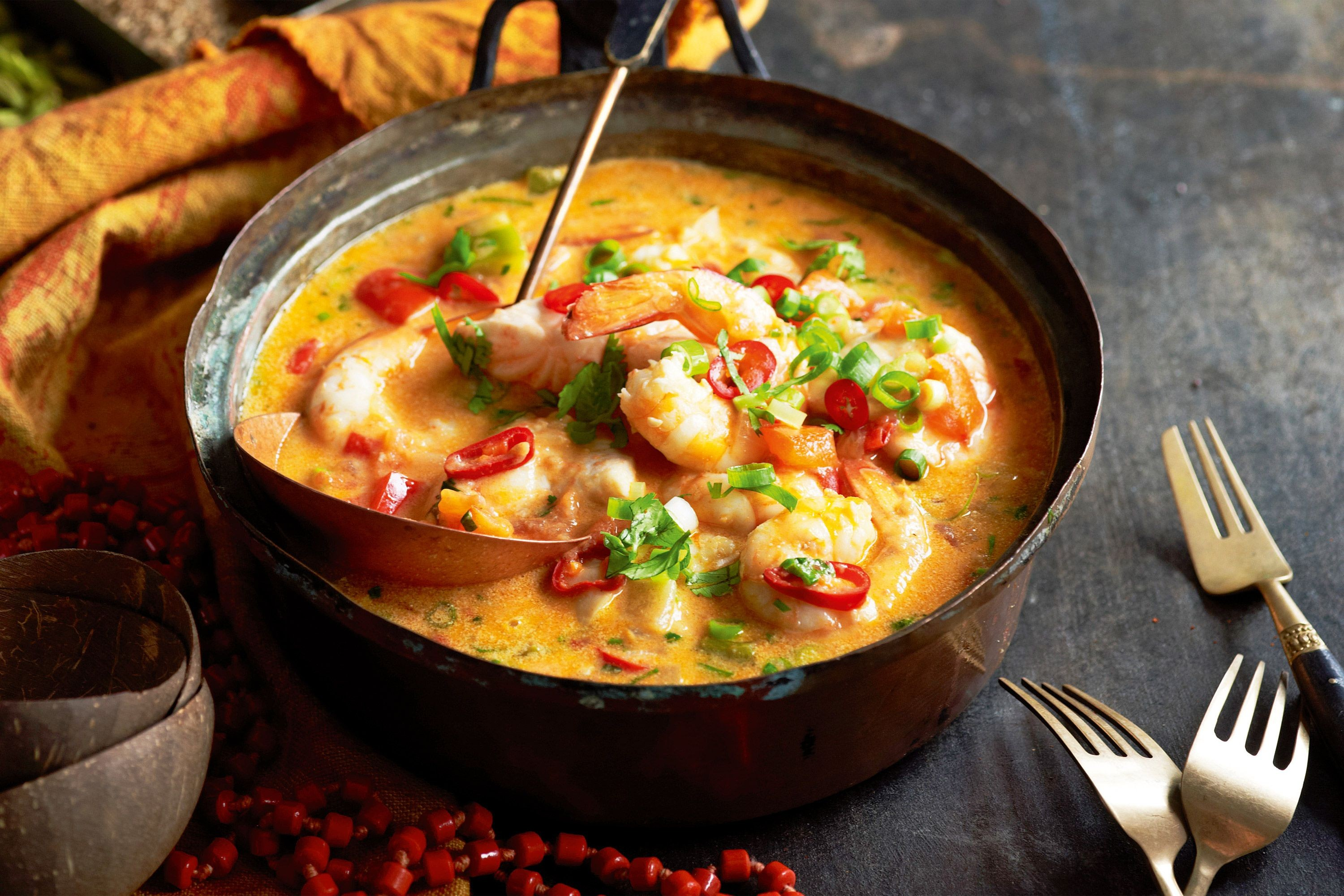
Moqueca from Bahia State

There is not an exact single "national Brazilian cuisine", but there is an assortment of various regional traditions and typical dishes. This diversity is linked to the origins of the people inhabiting each area.

For instance, the cuisine of Bahia is heavily influenced by a mix of African, Indigenous, and Portuguese cuisines. Chili (including chili sauces) and palm oil are very common. In the northern states, however, due to the abundance of forest and freshwater rivers, fish, fruits and cassava (including flours made of cassava) are staple foods. In the deep south, as in Rio Grande do Sul, the influence shifts more towards gaúcho traditions shared with its neighbors Argentina and Uruguay, with many meat-based products, due to this region's livestock-based economy; the churrasco, a kind of barbecue, is a local tradition.

=== Center-West Brazil's cuisine ===
In the state of Goiás, the pequi fruit is used in typical foods, such as arroz com pequi (rice cooked with pequi), and in snacks, such as a filling for pastel. The dish Galinhada, which is a mixture of chicken and rice, is popular in the state.

The states of Mato Grosso and Mato Grosso do Sul received influence from neighboring countries in their cuisine, as well as the Pantanal area and its various rivers and extensive wetlands that cross these two states with a high abundance of fish.

=== Southeast Brazil's cuisine ===
In the states of Rio de Janeiro, São Paulo, Espírito Santo, and Minas Gerais, feijoada is popular, especially as a Wednesday or Saturday lunch. Also consumed frequently is picadinho (literally, diced meat) and rice and beans. In Rio de Janeiro, besides the feijoada, a popular plate is any variation of grilled beef fillet, rice and beans, farofa, fried garlic and fried potatoes (batatas portuguesas), commonly called filé à Osvaldo Aranha. Seafood is very popular in coastal areas, as is roasted chicken (galeto). The strong Portuguese heritage also endowed the city with a taste for bolinhos de bacalhau (fried cod fritters), one of the most common street foods there.

In São Paulo, a typical dish is virado à paulista, made with rice, virado de feijão (similar to a tutu), sauteed kale, fried plantains or bananas and pork chops. São Paulo is also the home of pastel, a food consisting of thin pastry envelopes wrapped around assorted fillings, then deep-fried in vegetable oil. It is a common belief that they originated when Chinese and Japanese immigrants adapted the recipe of fried spring rolls to sell as snacks at weekly street markets. São Paulo is also known for parmegianna.

The countryside of São Paulo also has its own individual cuisine. Among notable examples is the farofa de Iça [pt] (farofa made out of the abdomen of the Saúva), the snack bolinho caipira [pt], Taiada [pt] (a candy made of sugarcane) and Torta Holandesa, a dessert invented in Campinas. The state has an itinerant cultural festival known as Revelando São Paulo, which travels the state showing the different cuisines of every region.

In Minas Gerais, the regional dishes include corn, pork, beans, chicken (including the very typical dish frango com quiabo, or chicken with okra), tutu de feijão (puréed beans mixed with cassava flour), and local soft-ripened traditional cheeses. It also is known for its soups, such as Canjiquinha, a soup made with corn, pork ribs, lettuce, pepper and spices.

In Espírito Santo, there is significant Italian and German influence in local dishes, both savory and sweet. The state dish, though, is of Amerindian origin, called moqueca capixaba, which is a tomato and fish stew traditionally prepared in a panela de Goiabeiras (pot made of clay from Goiabeiras district in Vitória). Amerindian and Italian cuisine are the two main pillars of Capixaba cuisine. Seafood dishes, in general, are very popular in Espírito Santo, but unlike other Amerindian dishes, the use of olive oil is almost mandatory. Bobó de camarão, torta capixaba, and polenta are also very popular.

=== Southern Brazil's cuisine ===
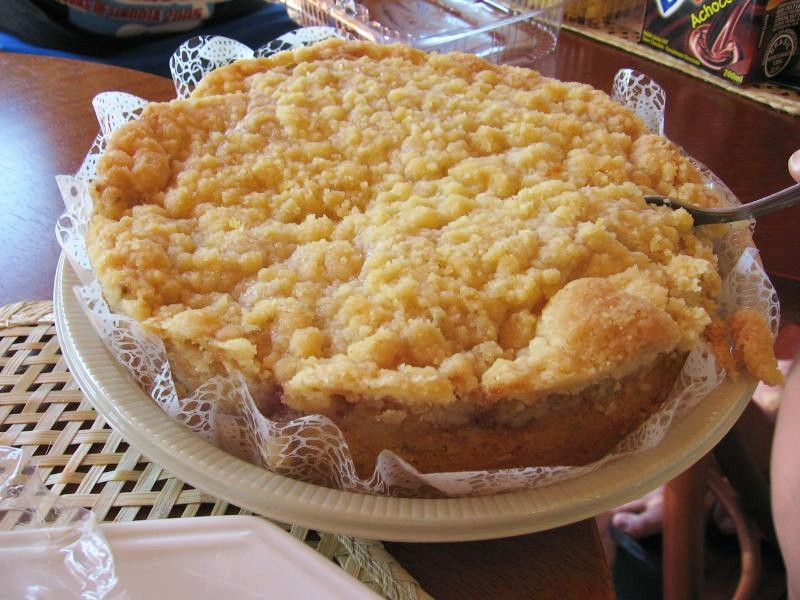
Cuca

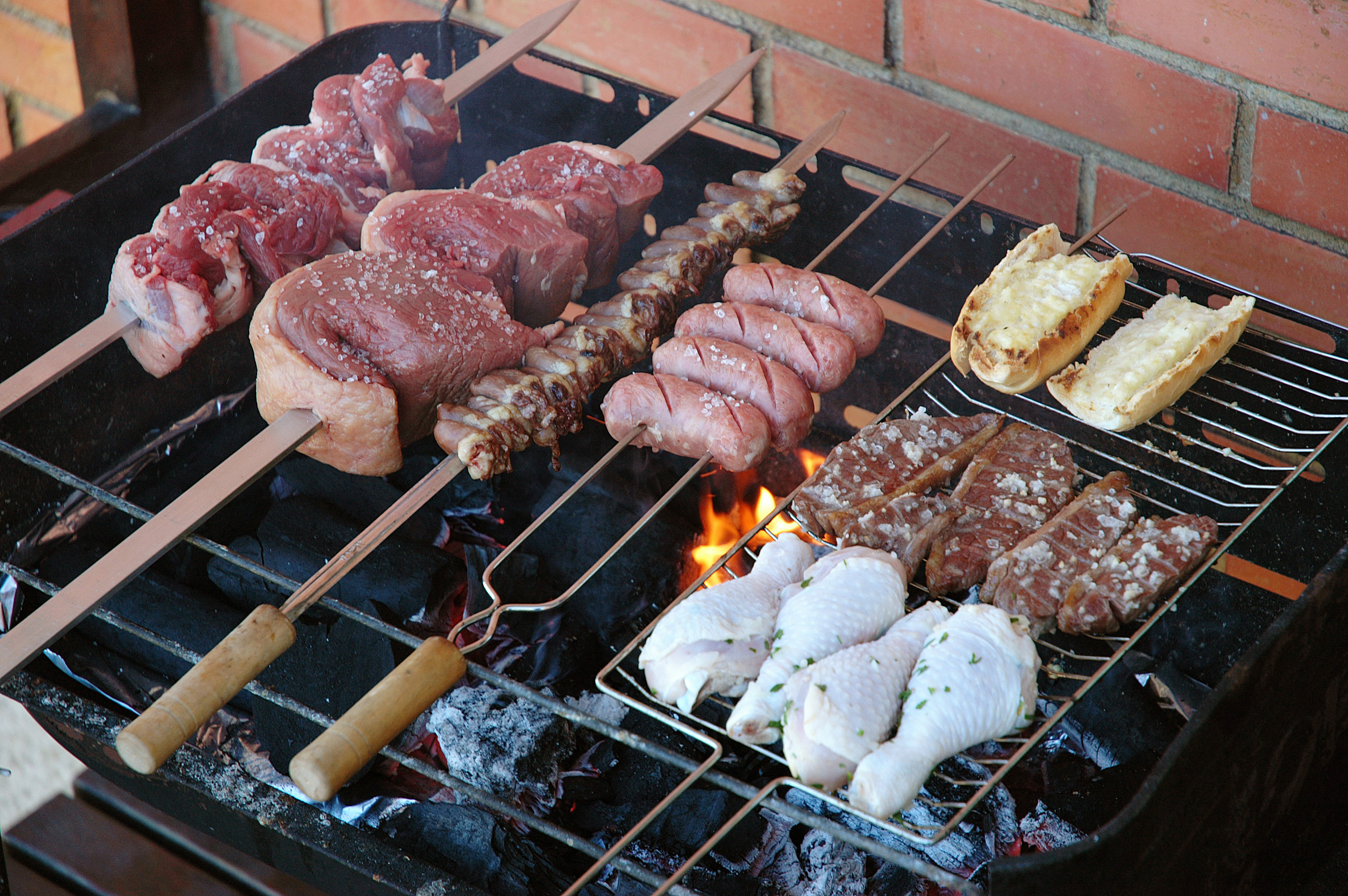
Typical Brazilian churrasco, with cuts of meat such as picanha and alcatra, chicken hearts, Tuscan sausage, garlic bread and drumstick

In Southern Brazil, due to the long tradition in livestock production and the heavy German immigration, red meat is the basis of the local cuisine.

Besides many of the pasta, sausage and dessert dishes common to continental Europe, churrasco is the term for a barbecue (similar to the Argentine or Uruguayan asado) which originated in southern Brazil. It contains a variety of meats which may be cooked on a purpose-built churrasqueira, a barbecue grill, often with supports for spits or skewers. Portable churrasqueiras are similar to those used to prepare the Argentine and Uruguayan asado, with a grill support, but many Brazilian churrasqueiras do not have grills, only the skewers above the embers. The meat may alternatively be cooked on large metal or wood skewers resting on a support or stuck into the ground and roasted with the embers of charcoal (wood may also be used, especially in the State of Rio Grande do Sul).

Since gaúchos were nomadic and lived off the land, they had no way of preserving food; the gauchos would gather together after butchering a cow, and skewer and cook the large portions of meat immediately over a wood-burning fire (not exactly as gauchos also produced charque). The slow-cooked meat basted in its own juices and resulted in tender, flavorful steaks. This style has inspired many contemporary churrascaria which emulates the cooking style where waiters bring large cuts of roasted meat to diners' tables and carve portions to order.

The chimarrão is the regional beverage, often associated with the gaúcho image.

The most typical dishes of Rio Grande do Sul cuisine are churrasco, chimarrão, arroz carreteiro, fried polenta, galeto, cuca, and sagu, among others. In the region there is a large consumption of wine, grape juice and white grape juice due to the south being the largest grape producer in the country, and artisanal cheeses and salamis. In the region, fig, grape and peach jellies and jams are also very common. One of the most famous is chimia. The consumption of vegetables preserved in water, vinegar, sugar, salt and spices, such as beets and cucumbers, is also typical of the Southern Region.

The state of Paraná has a varied cuisine thanks to the many immigration movements that colonized the state. Among its influences are German, Polish, Ukrainian, Dutch, Arab and Russian cuisines. Among them are Carne de Onça, a variant of Hackepeter, the Embutido Cracóvia (Kraków), and the Kutiá, a dessert of Ukrainian origin. The paranaense cuisine also includes influences from its own biome, such as the use of pinhão, the nuts of the Araucaria angustifolia for dishes like Entrevero de Pinhão and Pierogui made with pinhão.

=== Northeast Brazil's cuisine ===
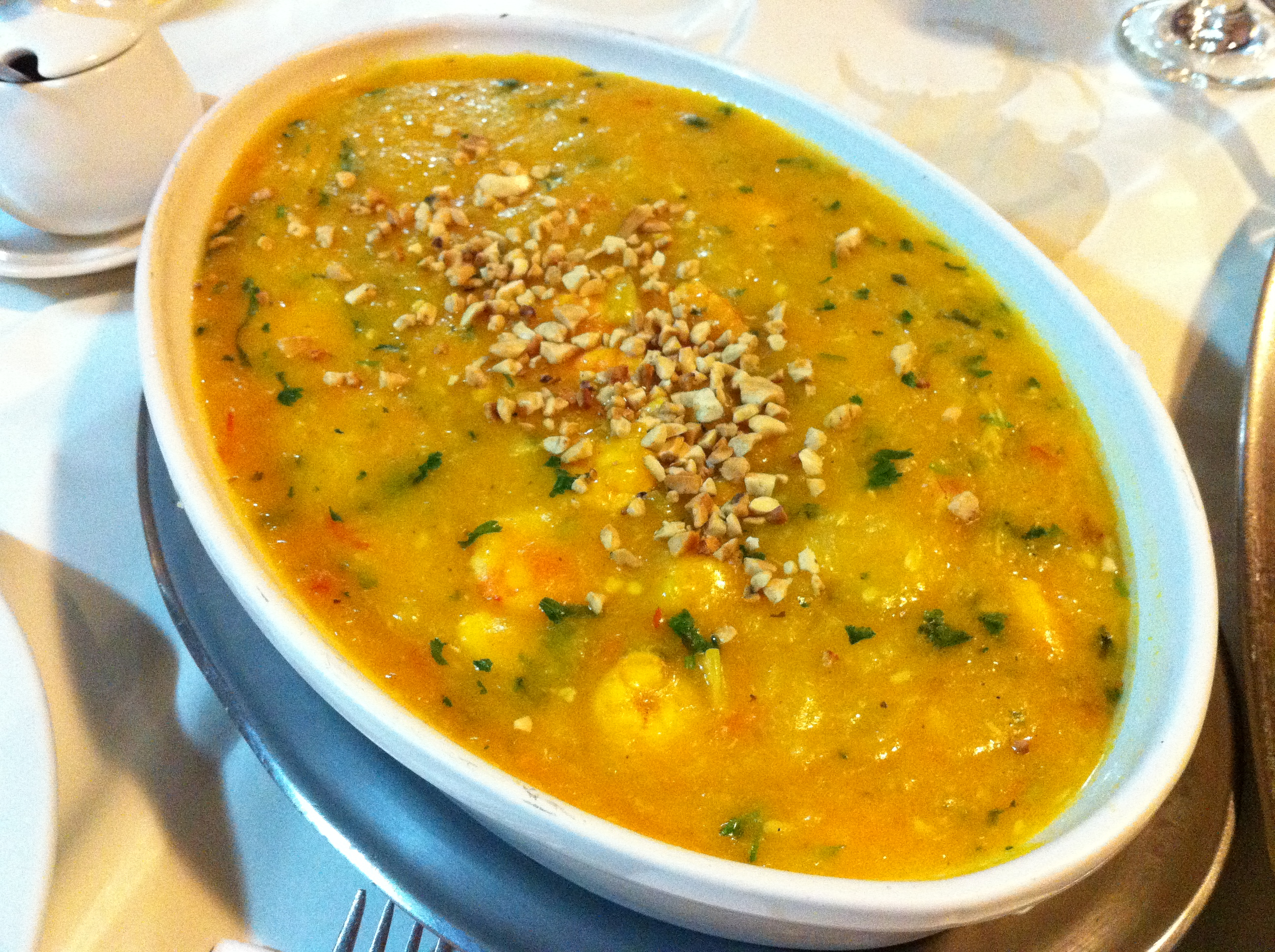
Bobó de camarão

Northeastern Brazilian cuisine is heavily influenced by African cuisine from the coastal areas of the states of Pernambuco to Bahia, as well as the eating habits of indigenous populations who have lived in the region.

Vatapá is an Afro-Brazilian dish made from bread, shrimp, coconut milk, finely ground peanuts and palm oil, mashed into a creamy paste. The word "vatapá" is derived from the Yoruba words Ẹ̀bà Tápà.

Bobó de camarão is a dish made with cassava and shrimp (camarão).

Acarajé is a dish made from peeled black-eyed peas formed into a ball and then deep-fried in dendê (palm oil). Often sold as street food, it is served split in half and then stuffed with vatapá and caruru. Acarajé is typically available outside of the Northeast as well.

In western areas farther from the coast, the plates are most reminiscent of the indigenous cuisine, with many vegetables being cultivated in the area since before the arrival of the Portuguese. Examples include baião de dois from the state of Ceará, a dish made with rice and beans (preferably feijão verde or feijão novo), dried meat, butter, queijo coalho (a lightweight cheese similar to halloumi and often grilled) and other ingredients. Jaggery is also heavily identified with the Northeast, as it is carne-de-sol (sun-cured meat), paçoca de pilão (cassava flour and dried meat), and bolo de rolo (a cake from Pernambuco).

Tapioca flatbreads or pancakes are also commonly served for breakfast in some states, with a filling of either coconut, cheese or condensed milk, butter, and certain meats. They can also be filled with dessert toppings as well.

=== North Brazil's cuisine ===
The cuisine of this region, which includes the states of Acre, Amazonas, Amapá, Pará, Rondônia, Roraima, and Tocantins, is heavily influenced by indigenous cuisine. In the state of Pará, there are several typical dishes, including:

Pato no tucupi (duck in tucupi) – one of the most famous dishes from Pará. It is associated with the Círio de Nazaré, a local Roman Catholic celebration. The dish is made with tucupi (yellow broth extracted from cassava, after the fermentation process of the broth remained after the starch had been taken off, from the raw ground manioc root, pressed by a cloth, with some water; if added maniva, the manioc ground up external part, that is poisonous because of the cyanic acid, and so must be cooked for several days). After cooking, the duck is cut into pieces and boiled in tucupi sauce for some time. The jambu is boiled in water with salt, drained, and put on the duck. It is served with white rice and manioc flour and corn tortillas.

== Popular snacks ==
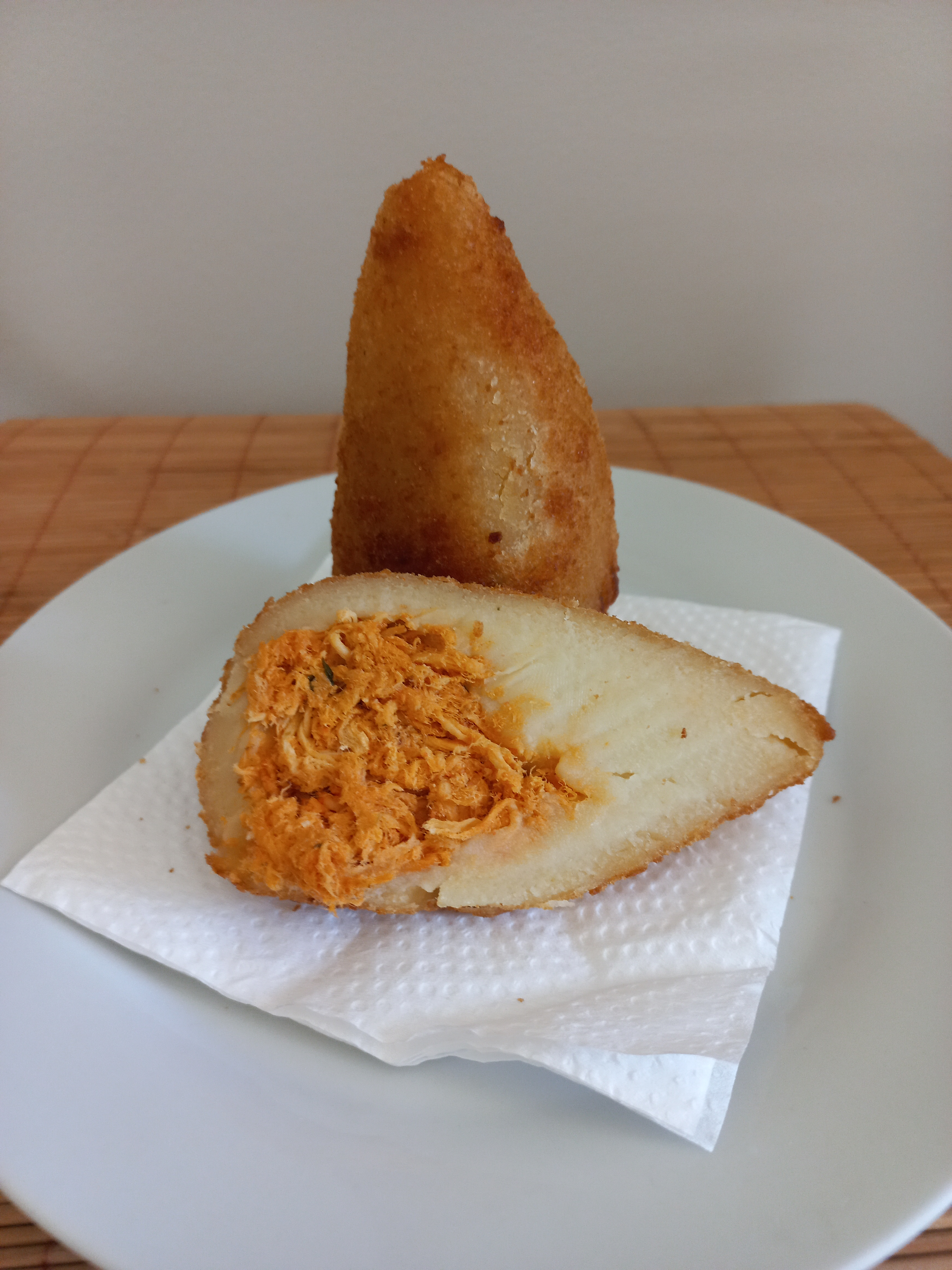
Coxinha is a popular Brazilian snack

Salgadinhos (lit. 'Little salty one') are small savoury snacks. Similar to Spanish tapas, these are mostly sold in corner shops and are a staple at working-class and lower-middle-class family celebrations. There are many types of salgadinhos:

- Pão de queijo (lit. 'Cheese bread'), a typical Brazilian snack, is a small, soft roll made of manioc flour, eggs, milk, and minas cheese. It can be bought ready-made at a corner store or frozen and ready to bake in a supermarket and is gluten-free.
- Coxinha (lit. 'Little thigh') is a chicken croquette shaped like a chicken thigh.
- Pastéis (sing. pastel) are pastries with a wide variety of fillings. Similar to Spanish fried empanadas but of Asian origin (and brought to Brazil by the Chinese diaspora and Japanese diaspora). Different shapes are used to tell apart the different flavours, the two most common shapes being half-moon (cheese) and square (meat). Size, flavour, and shape may vary greatly. They can be filled with various items, the most consumed being those filled with meat, cheese, chicken, heart of palm, without filling (called "wind pastel"), shrimp, chocolate with banana and cheese with guava paste.
- Bolinhos de bacalhau (lit. 'Little cod cakes') are fried cod fish pastries that are mainly found in Rio de Janeiro, but also in other regions of the country.
- Empadas are snacks that resemble pot pies in a small scale. They can be filled with various items, the most popular being empadas filled with hearts of palm, shrimp, chicken and cheese.
- Quibe, sometimes spelled Kibe, is a popular salgadinho that was created by Syrian and Lebanese immigrants as an adaption of kibbeh.
- Esfiha, sometimes spelled Esfirra, are pastries that were brought by Arab immigrants and are popular in the state of São Paulo. They are commonly filled with ground beef, cheese, or vegetables.

Other appetizers that can typically be found in Brazilian territory are: croquette, rissole, coxa-creme, cueca virada, bolinho de aipim (cassava pastries), among others.

== Popular dishes ==
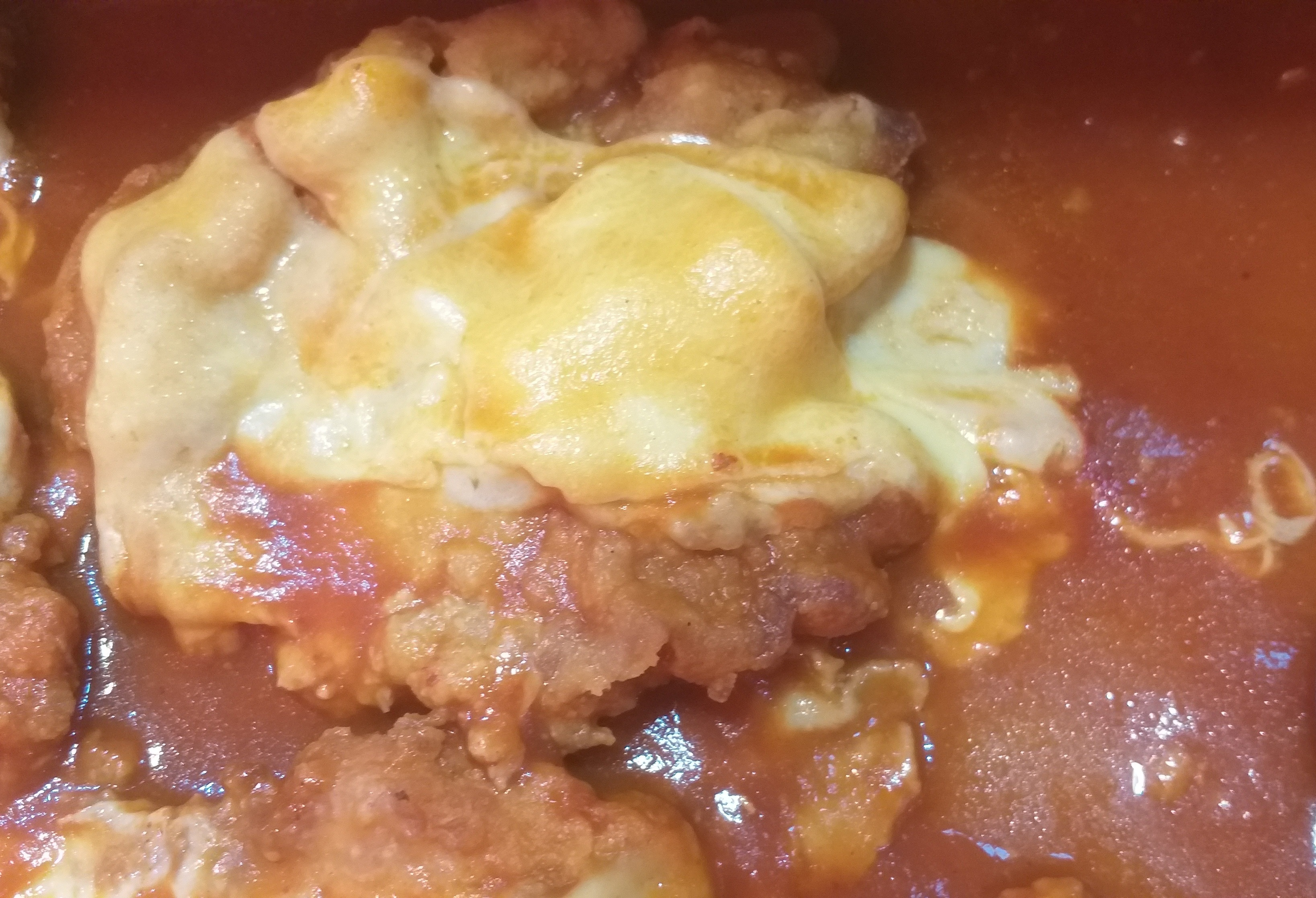
Bife à parmegiana, one of the most traditional dishes of Brazil

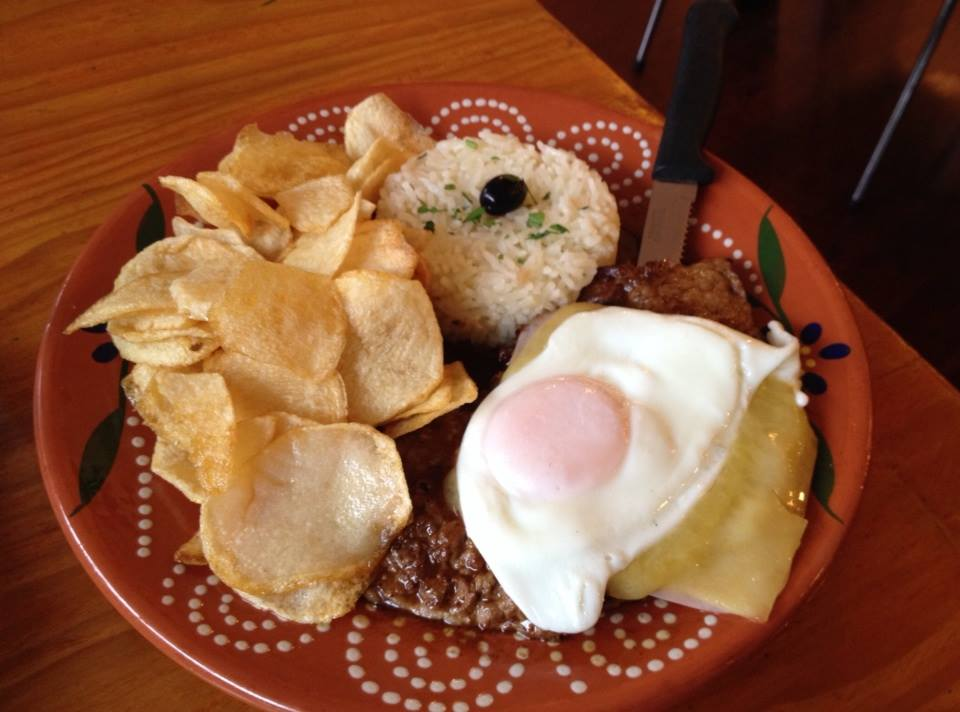
Bife a cavalo, a steak topped with an egg, served with fries

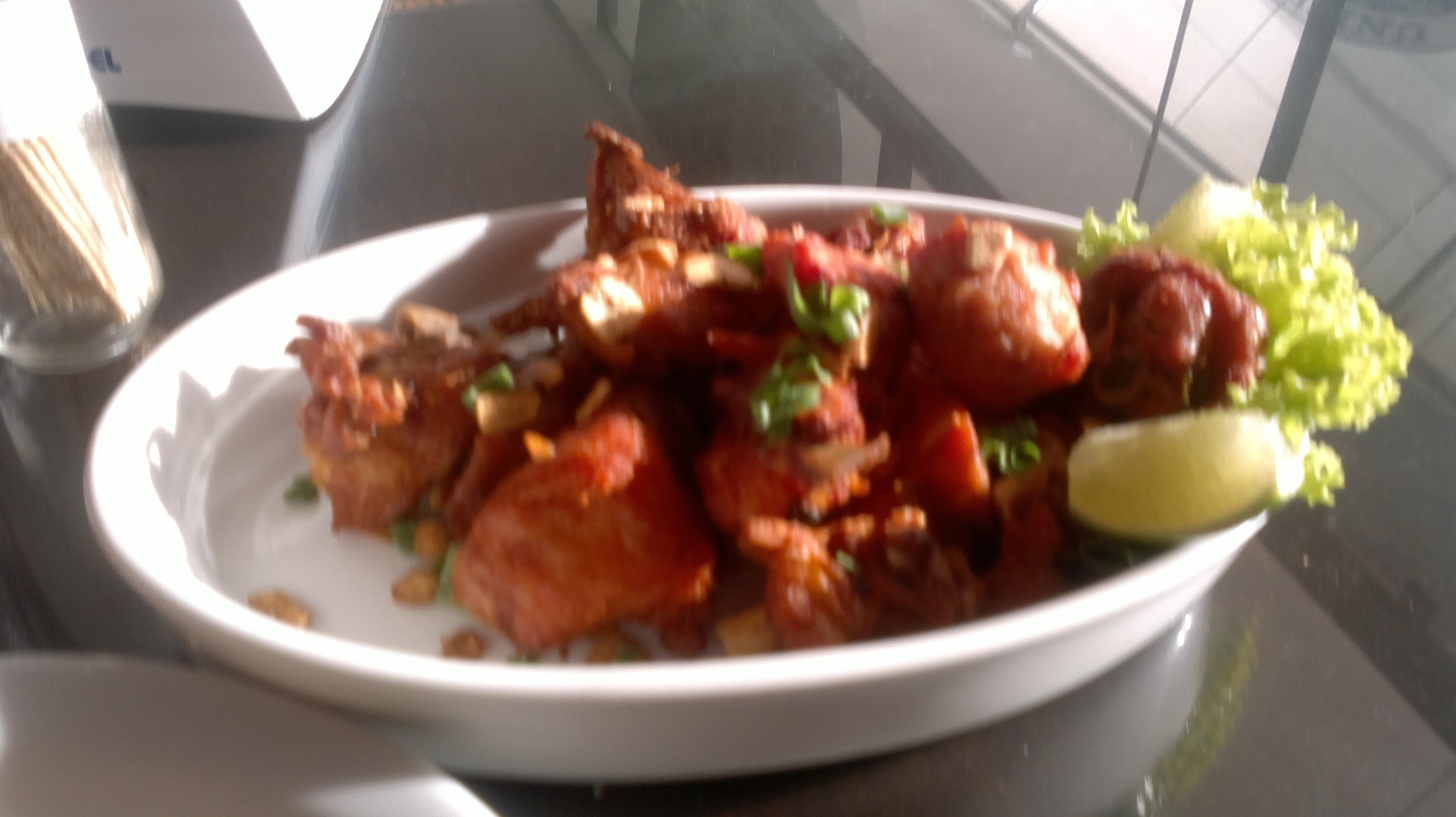
Frango a passarinho, a chicken dish, as served in the state of Minas Gerais

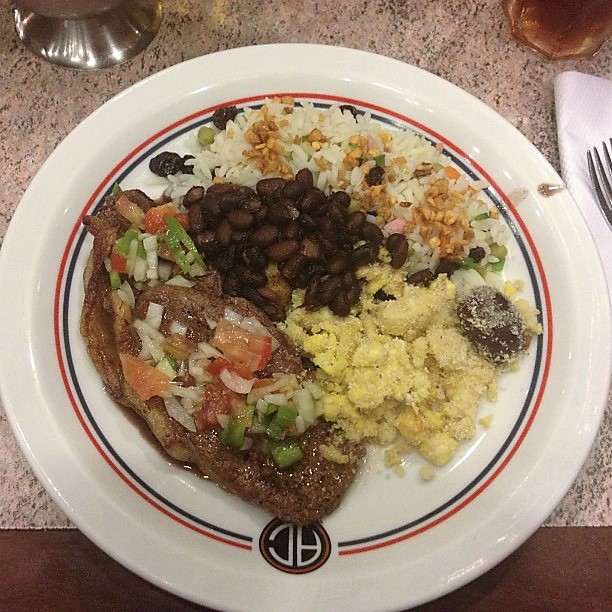
A typical Brazilian lunch consists of rice, beans, farofa, picanha and vinagrete prepared with chopped onion, tomato and pepper, vinegar, oil

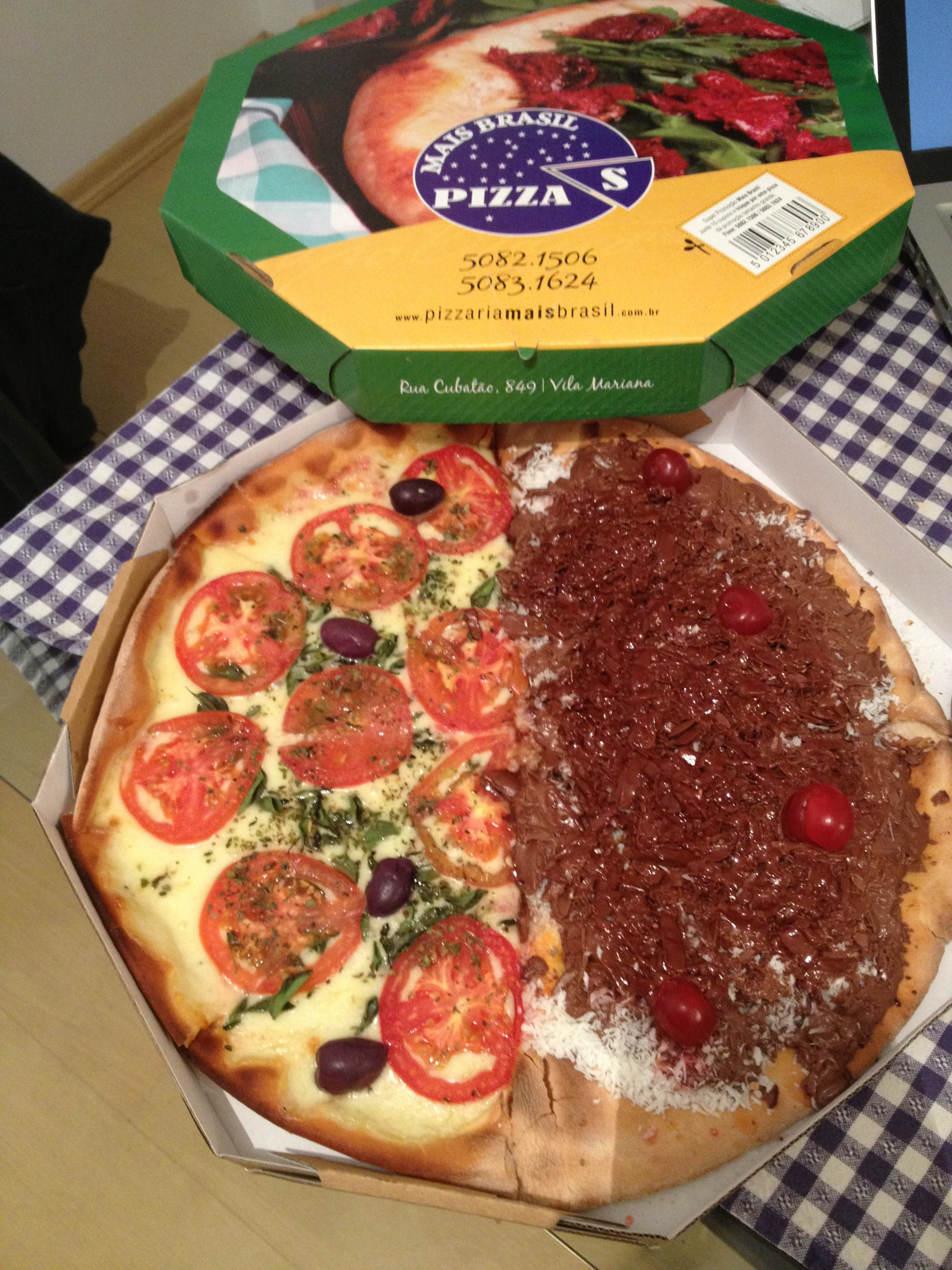
Brazilian pizza can have just about any flavor. Pictured is a half mozzarella, tomato, olives and spices (savory) and half chocolate, coconut and cherries (sweet) pizza

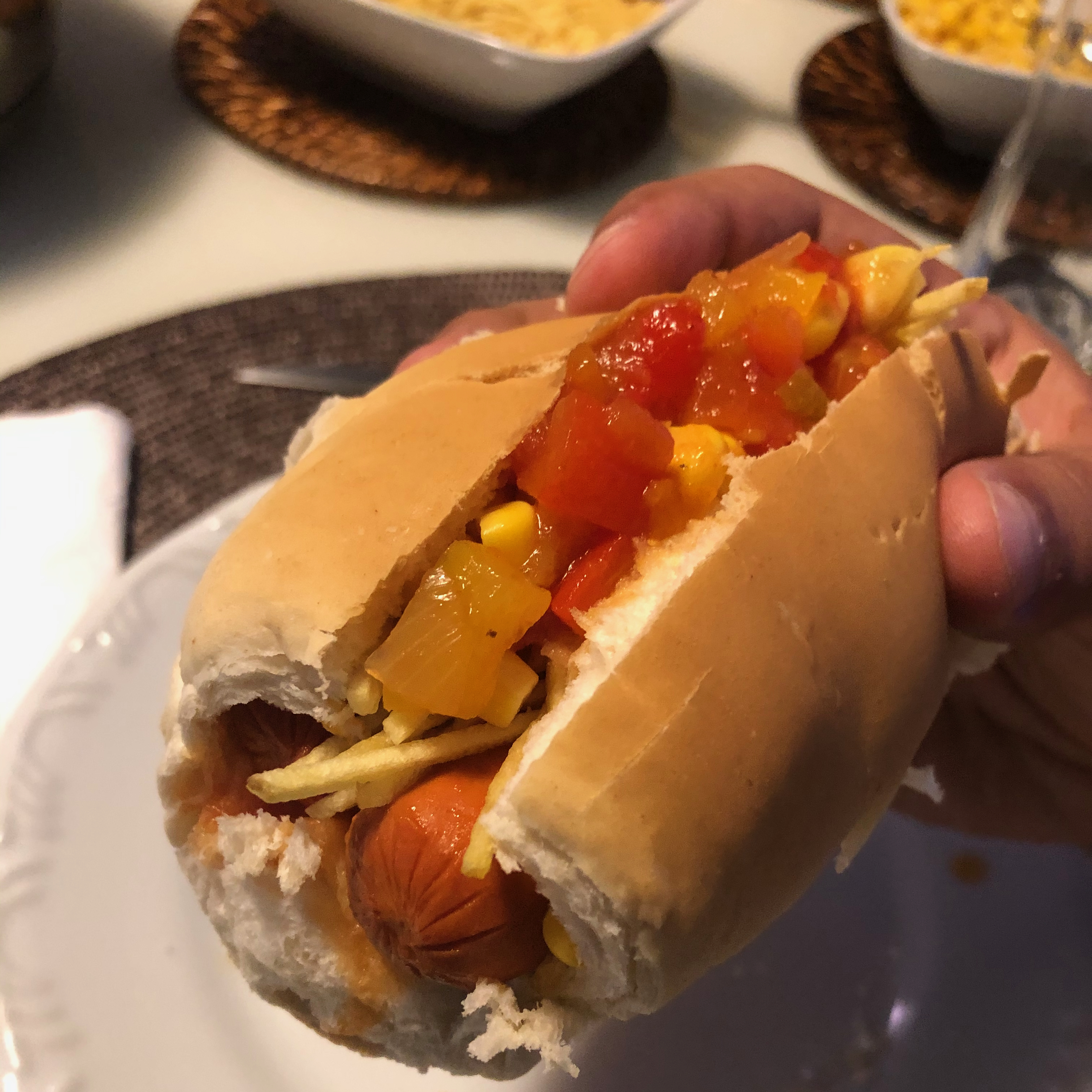
Brazilian hot dog with tomato, corn, batata-palha (straw-fries) and onion

Brazilian cuisine is recognized around the world for its variety and quality. The city of São Paulo was chosen as the 7th main gastronomic destination in the world, for its recognized restaurants and bars. This Brazilian city comes after Rome, London, Paris, Dubai, Barcelona and Madrid. The city of São Paulo alone has more than 9,000 restaurants and bars.

- Rice and beans is an extremely popular dish, considered basic at a table; a tradition Brazil shares with several Caribbean nations. Brazilian rice and beans usually are cooked utilizing either lard or the nowadays more common edible vegetable fats and oils, in a variation of the Mediterranean sofrito locally called refogado which usually includes garlic in both recipes.
- In variation to rice and beans, Brazilians usually eat pasta (including spaghetti, lasagne, gnocchi, lamen, and bīfun), pasta salad, various dishes using either potato or manioc, and polenta as substitutions for rice, as well as salads, dumplings or soups of green peas, chickpeas, black-eyed peas, broad beans, butter beans, soybeans, lentils, moyashi (which came to Brazil due to the Chinese and Japanese tradition of eating its sprouts), azuki, and other legumes in substitution for the common beans cultivated in South America since Pre-Columbian times. It is more common to eat substitutions for daily rice and beans in festivities such as Christmas and New Year's Eve (the tradition is lentils), as the follow-up of churrasco (mainly potato salad/carrot salad, called maionese, due to the widespread use of both industrial and home-made mayonnaise, which can include egg whites, raw onion, green peas, sweetcorn or even chayote squashes, and pronounced almost exactly as in English and French) and in other special occasions.
- Either way the basis of Brazilian daily cuisine is the starch (most often a cereal), legume, protein and vegetable combination. There is also a differentiation between vegetables of the verduras group, or greens, and the legumes group (no relation to the botanic concept), or non-green vegetables.
- Churrasco is the main dish of southern Brazil. Over time, other regions of Brazil adopted churrasco and created other ways of making it. The restaurant specializing in churrasco is a churrascaria.
- Picanha is a typical Brazilian cut of meat, being the most appreciated by the people of the country.
- Farofa, cooked cassava flour that is served as an accompaniment/condiment. Its crunchiness is especially appreciated.
- Bife a cavalo: a steak topped with a fried egg, usually accompanied by French fries and sometimes salad.
- Bife à parmegiana: fried steak, consisting of a sliced piece of meat, breaded with wheat flour and eggs (egg whites), topped with Parmesan cheese and lots of tomato sauce and seasonings such as oregano to taste. Sometimes Parmesan replaces mozzarella slices. Although it is a dish invented in Brazil and typical of Brazilian culture, generally, in the country itself, it is considered an Italian recipe.
- Virado, typical dish from the state of São Paulo, where it is also known as Virado à Paulista, which consists of a pork chop, fried plantain, cassava flour beans, rice, cabbage and fried egg.
- Tutu de feijão, typical dish from the state of Minas Gerais, made with boiled beans, sautéed and thickened with cassava or corn flour. It is usually sautéed with pieces of fried bacon, onion and garlic, and mixed with cassava flour or corn flour depending on the type of bean.
- Arroz carreteiro is a typical dish from the southern region of Brazil, made from rice to which is added finely chopped and sautéed beef, shredded or minced dried meat or sun-dried meat, sometimes paio, bacon and chorizo. in pieces, sautéed in a lot of fat, with garlic, onion, tomato and parsley, always with a lot of seasoning.
- Galinhada is a typical dish from the states of Paraná, São Paulo, Minas Gerais and Goiás, which consists of cooked rice and cooked chicken pieces. The seasoning is composed of saffron (which gives the rice the typical yellowish color), vinagrete (optional and to accompany), and bean tutu. The typical Goiás chicken dish contains guariroba (a type of bitter palm) and pequi.
- Barreado is a typical dish in the Brazilian state of Paraná. It is a slow-cooked meat stew prepared in a clay pot whose lid is sealed with a sort of clay made from wheat or cassava flour, hence the name (which means, literally, "muddied"). Traditionally, Barreado was made of buffalo meat, but nowadays it is usually made of beef, bacon, tomatoes, onion, cumin and other spices, placed in successive layers in a large clay urn, covered and then "barreada" (sealed) with a paste of ash and farinha (manioc flour), and then slowly cooked in a wood-fired oven for 12 to 18 hours. Nowadays pressure cookers and gas or electric ovens are more commonly used.
- Pizza is also extremely popular. It is usually made in a wood-fired oven with a thin, flexible crust, little or very little sauce, and a number of interesting toppings. While it is normal for a pizza to be thin and with few ingredients (the "traditional" Italian pizza), in Brazil it can have more than 100 flavors, savory (with ingredients such as linguiça calabresa, pepperoni, egg, tomato, poultry (either milled chicken meat or smoked turkey breast), catupiry, Canadian loin, tuna, onion and you can still find pizzas with more exotic flavors such as hamburger, stroganoff or sushi) or sweets (with flavors such as chocolate, banana with cinnamon, goiabada with cheese, fig, with scoops of ice cream, M&Ms, etc.). Traditionally olive oil is poured over the pizza, but in some regions people enjoy ketchup, mustard and even mayonnaise on pizza.
- Cachorro quente (lit. 'Hot dog') is the Brazilian version of hot dogs. It is another dish that has been modified in Brazil, practically becoming a complete lunch. There, the most common version is the "X-Tudo" (in literal translation, cheese-everything), or "Podrão" (in literal translation, "rotten", or "big rotten" due to the usually excessive amount of food in the dish), where, in addition to conventional bread and sausages with ketchup, mustard and mayonnaise, it is filled with a series of additional ingredients ranging from straw fries, grated Parmesan cheese, corn kernels, peas and olives to quail eggs.
- Misto-quente is grilled ham and cheese sandwich.
- Angu is a popular side dish (or a substitution for rice replacing the "starch element" and it is commonly used in Southern and Southeastern Brazil). It is similar to the Italian polenta.
- Arroz com pequi is a traditional dish from the Brazilian Cerrado, and the symbol of Center-Western Brazil's cuisine. It is basically made with rice seasoned on pequi, also known as a souari nut, and often chicken.
- Cuscuz branco is a dessert consisting of milled tapioca cooked with coconut milk and sugar and is the couscous equivalent of rice pudding.
- Açaí, cupuaçu, carambola, and many other tropical fruits are shipped from the Amazon rainforest and consumed in smoothies or as fresh fruit. Other aspects of Amazonian cuisine are also gaining a following.
- Pinhão is the pine nut of the Araucaria angustifolia, a common tree in the highlands of southern Brazil. The nuts are boiled and eaten as a snack in the winter months. It is typically eaten during the festas juninas.
- Risoto (risotto) is an Italian originated rice dish cooked with chicken, shrimp, and seafood in general or other protein staples sometimes served with vegetables, another very popular dish in Southern Brazil due to massive waves of Italian immigration.
- Mortadella sandwich is very common in São Paulo due to Italian immigration.

Also noteworthy are:

- Special ethnic foods and restaurants that are frequently found in Brazil include Arab cuisine (Lebanese and Syrian), local variations of Chinese cuisine (nevertheless closer to the traditional than American Chinese cuisine), Italian cuisine, and Japanese cuisine (sushi bars are a constant in a lot of cities and towns, and people from Rio de Janeiro are more used to temaki than people from São Paulo, home of more than 70% of the Japanese diaspora in the country).
- Brazil nut cake is a cake in Brazilian cuisine that is common and popular in the Amazon region of Brazil, Bolivia and Peru.
- Broa, cornbread with fennel.
- Pirão, a porridge-like dish of manioc in fish stock.
- Pão na chapa, a popular breakfast food.

== Cheese ==
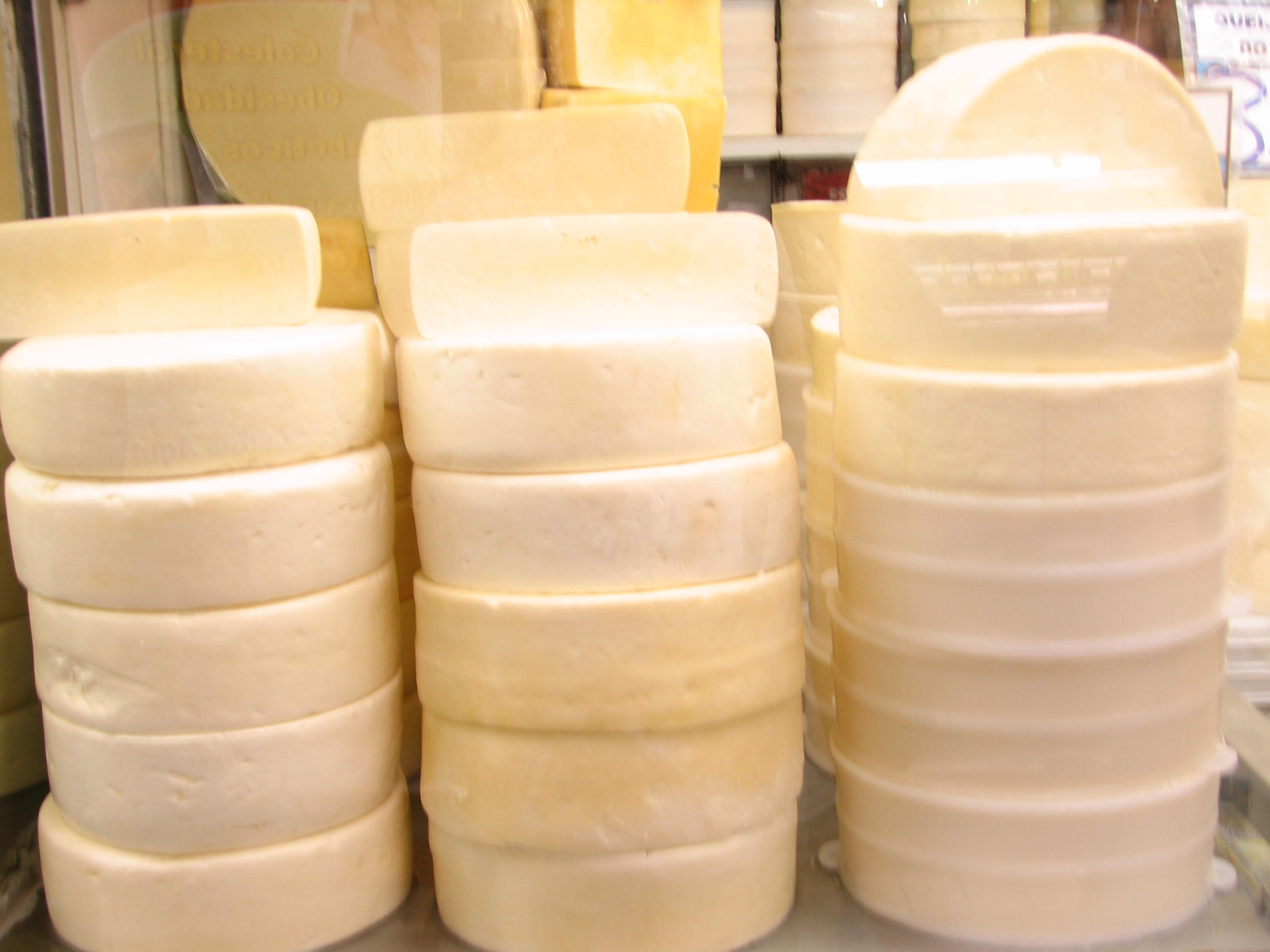
Canastra cheese

Several types of cheese are produced exclusively in Brazil. The characteristics vary between the different states of the country, mainly depending on the climate, type of soil and cattle diet, which causes subtle changes in the quality of the milk. The dairy-producing state of Minas Gerais is known for most of these cheeses. Some of them are considered among the best cheeses in the world. Some of the country's most famous cheeses are:

- Minas, also known as "white cheese", is a light cow's milk cheese, packaged in water.
- Catupiry, a creamy, processed cheese invented in Minas Gerais that is primarily used as a topping or filling for pizzas. It is often sold in a distinctive round wooden box.
- Requeijão: a mildly salty, silky-textured, spreadable cheese often eaten on bread. There are several varieties: The "Requeijão de Corte" is the oldest variety, essentially artisanal, being solid; "Requeijão Cremoso" is currently the most widespread variety, being a pasty, white dairy product, made with skimmed milk and fresh cream. It is usually sold in glass or plastic cups and spread on bread for breakfast. "Requeijão Culinário" is a more consistent variety of creamy cottage cheese, designed to withstand high temperatures.
- Canastra
- Coalho, is a heat-resistant cheese, which means it can be cooked and grilled. It is usually eaten on beaches or at barbecues, roasted over a fire on skewers and eaten smoked over a fire.

== Drinks ==
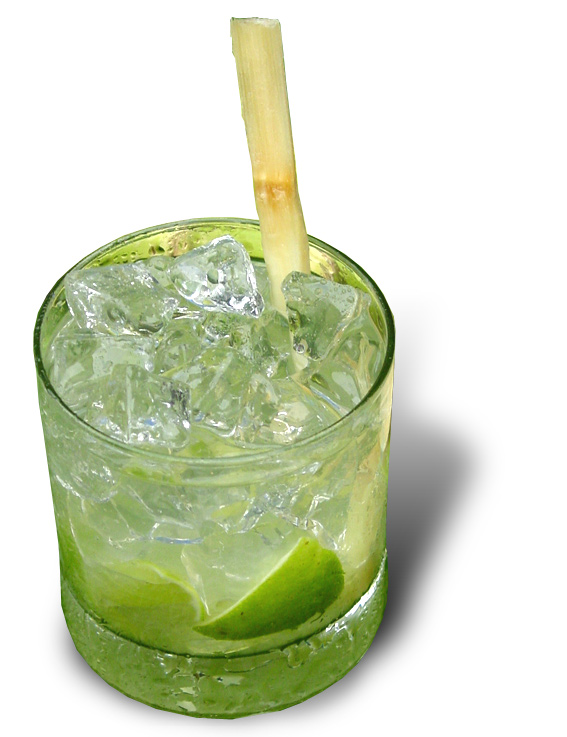
Caipirinha, the national drink

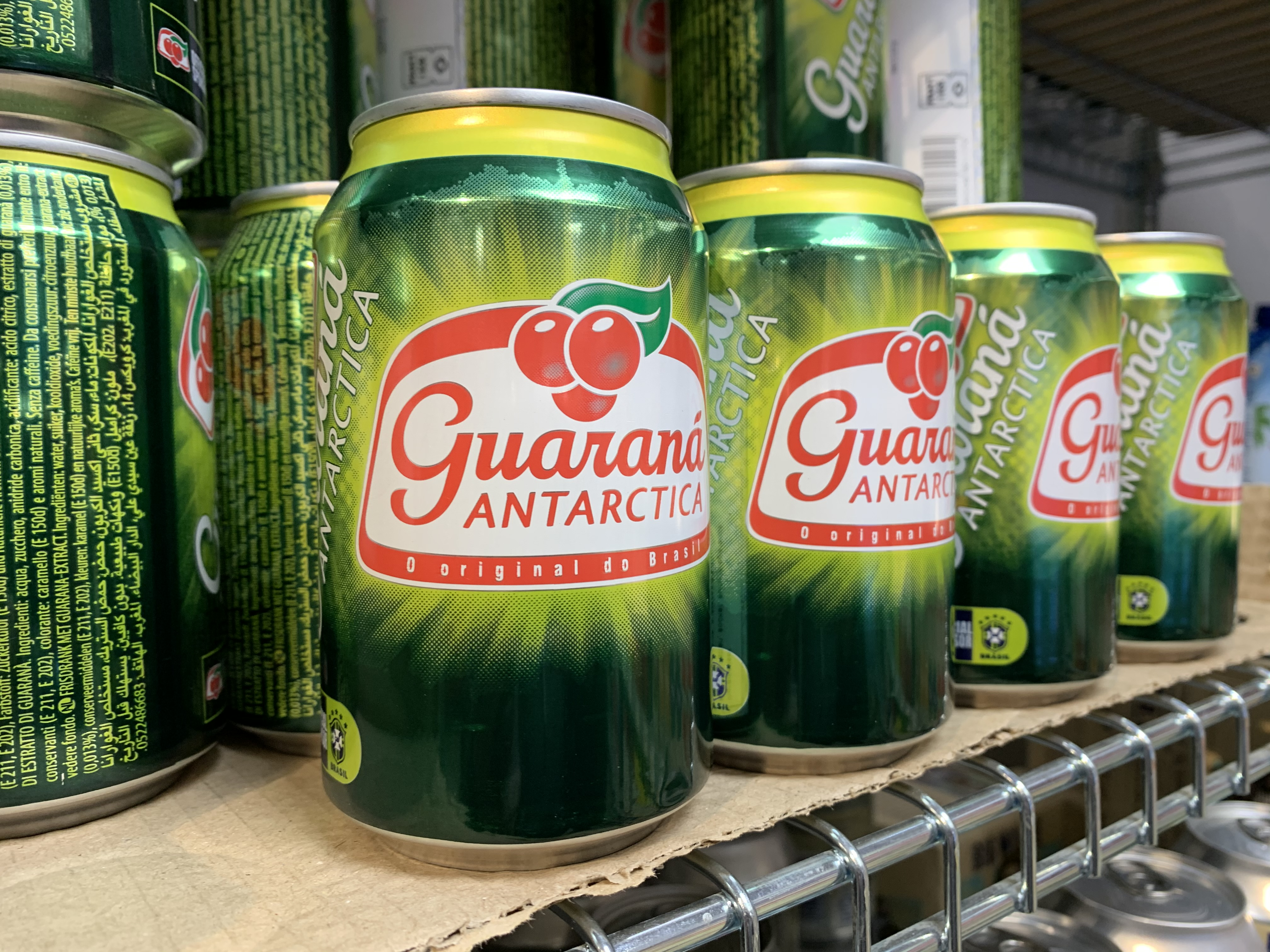
Guaraná

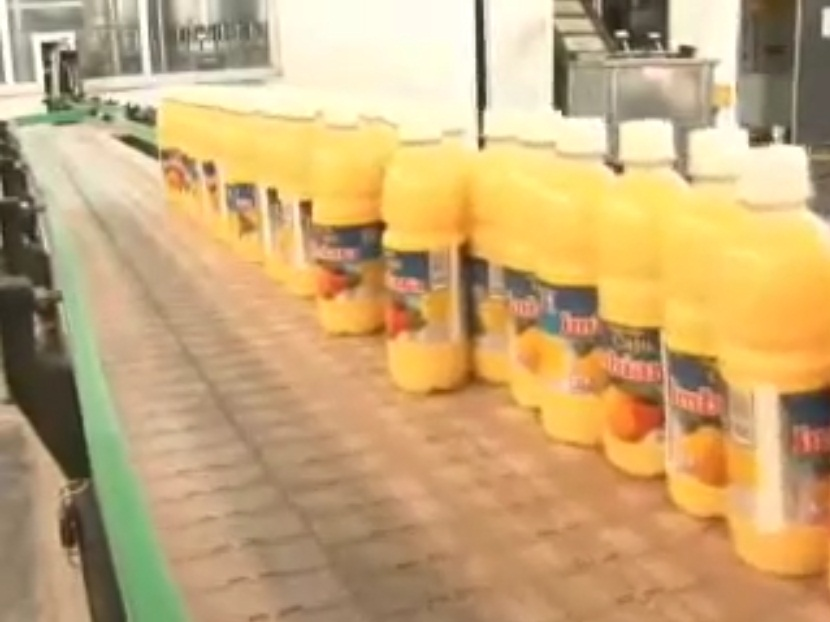
Cashew apple juice

Cachaça is Brazil's native liquor, distilled from sugar cane and it is the main ingredient in the national drink, the Caipirinha. Other drinks include mate tea, chimarrão and tereré (both made up of yerba maté), coffee, fruit juice, beer (mainly Pilsen variety), rum, guaraná and batidas. Guaraná is a caffeinated soft drink made from guaraná seeds and batida is a type of fruit punch.

Other drinks include:

- Água de Coco – coconut water.
- Caldo de cana – sugarcane juice.
- Aluá – prepared with maize, rice and sugar. It has also been referred to as corn wine.
- Bombeirinho – prepared with cachaça and gooseberry syrup, it is similar to a Kir Royal cocktail.
- Cachaça – a distilled spirit made from sugarcane juice. It is the most popular alcoholic beverage in Brazil. It is also informally referred to as cana, caninha and pinga.
- Caipirinha – a cocktail prepared using cachaça, lime juice and sugar.
- Caju Amigo – a cocktail made of cachaça and cashew juice.
- Cajuína
- Suco de caju– a juice made with cashew apple. Other famous juices that are typical of the country are those made from maracujá, goiaba, acerola and graviola.
- Licor de jabuticaba – a liqueur made with jabuticaba.
- Capeta – a cocktail prepared with vodka, guaraná powder and sweet skim milk.
- Cauim
- Chá mate gelado – roasted erva mate (Ilex paraguariensis) iced tea. Famous in homes and Rio de Janeiro, sold at its beaches.
- Chimarrão and Tererê – drink made from dried leaves of the yerba mate.
- Guaraná – soft drink made from the Guaraná plant.
- Limonada suíça – prepared with lime pieces with peel, ice cubes, sugar, and water. The version with condensed milk is also popular.
- Quentão
- Rabo-de-galo – a cocktail prepared with cachaça and red vermouth.
- Tiquira – a cachaça beverage prepared with manioc.
- Umbuzada or imbuzada – prepared with cooked umbu fruit, milk, and sugar.
- Vinho Quente – hot mulled wine popular in the winter.

== Typical and popular desserts ==
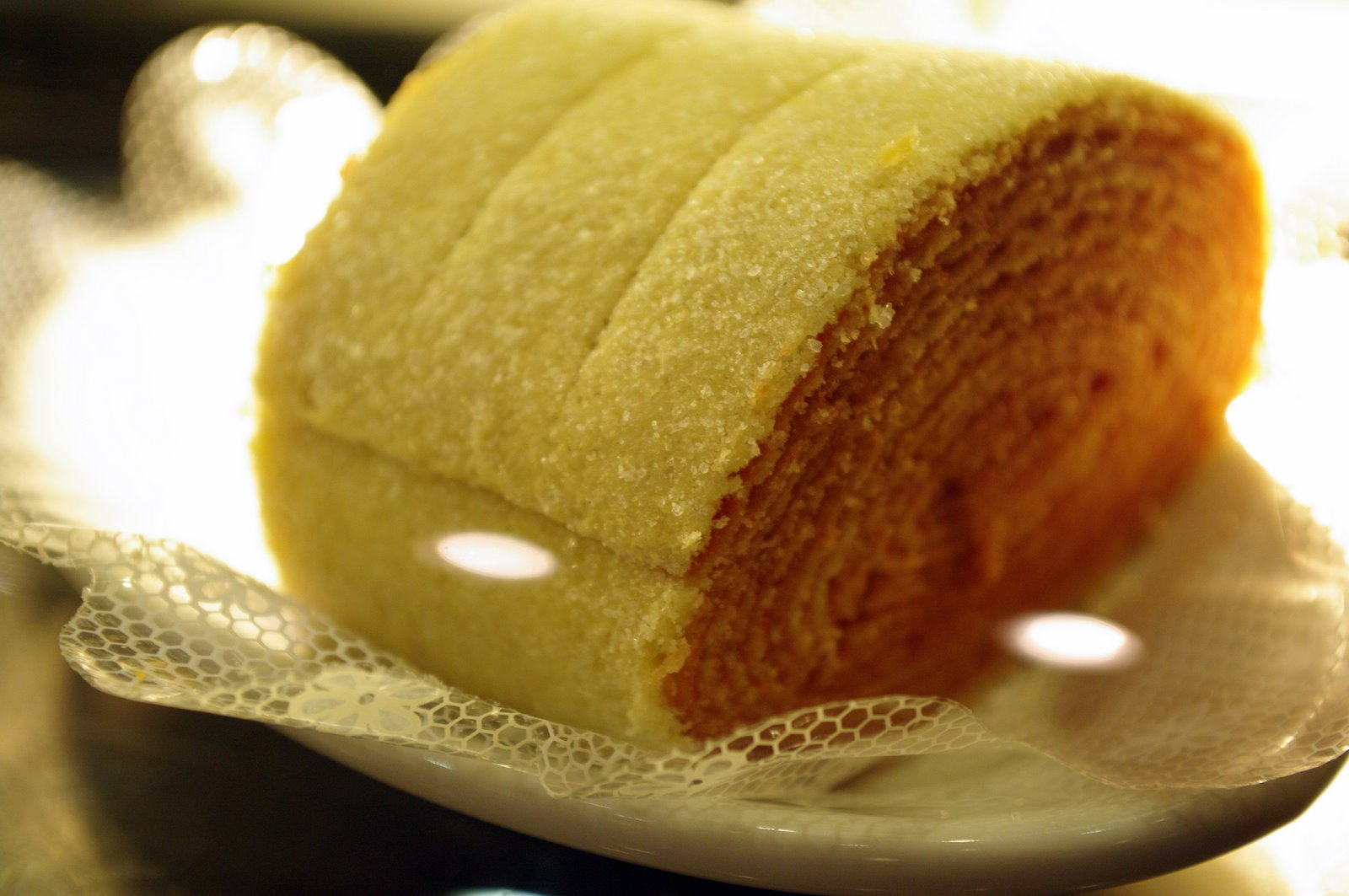
Bolo de rolo

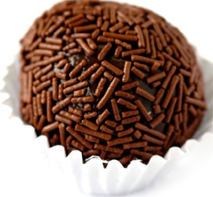
Brigadeiro

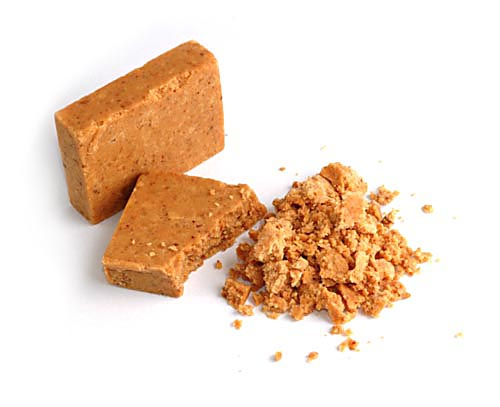
Paçoca

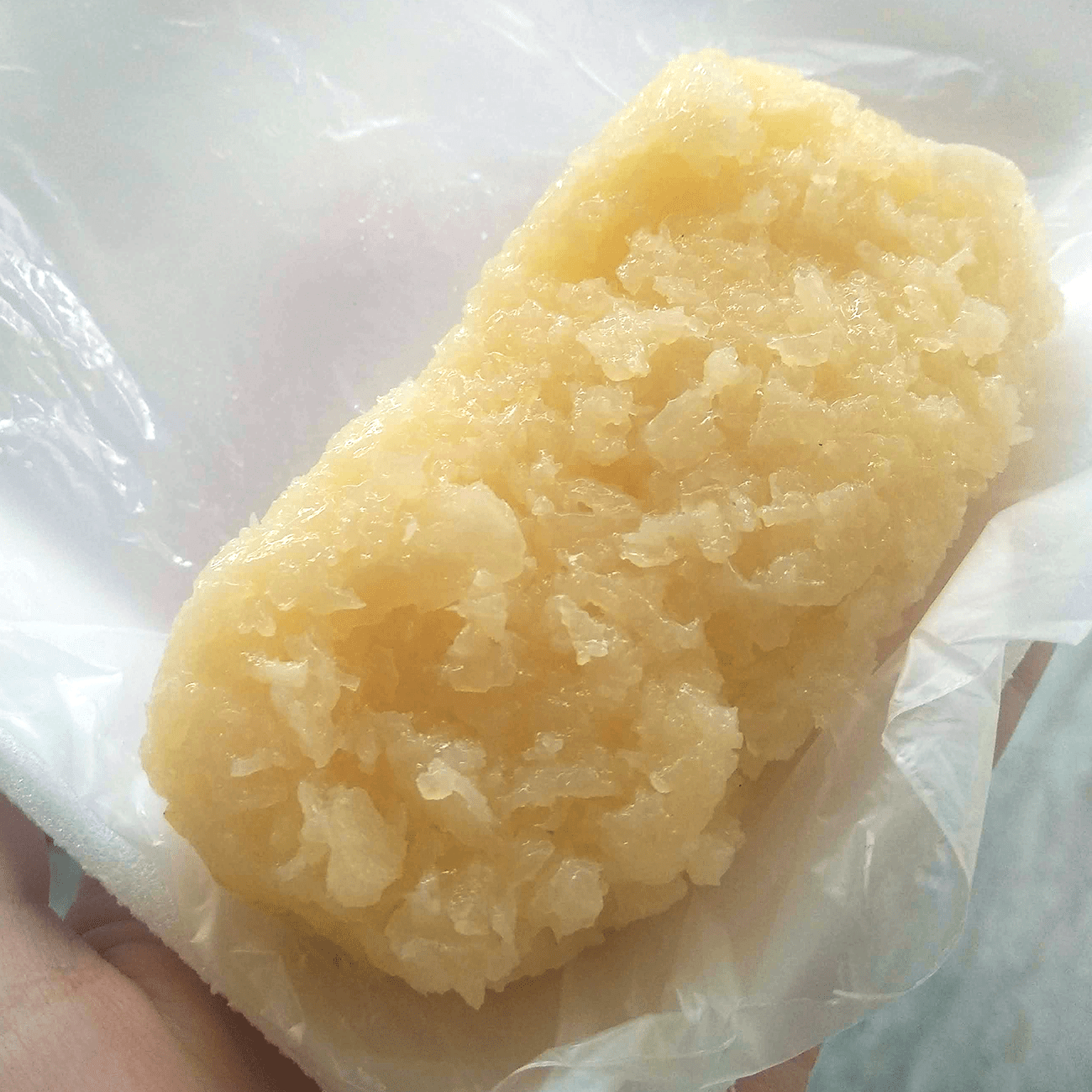
Brazilian cocada

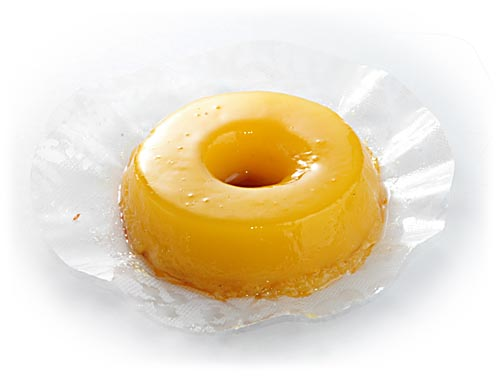
Quindim

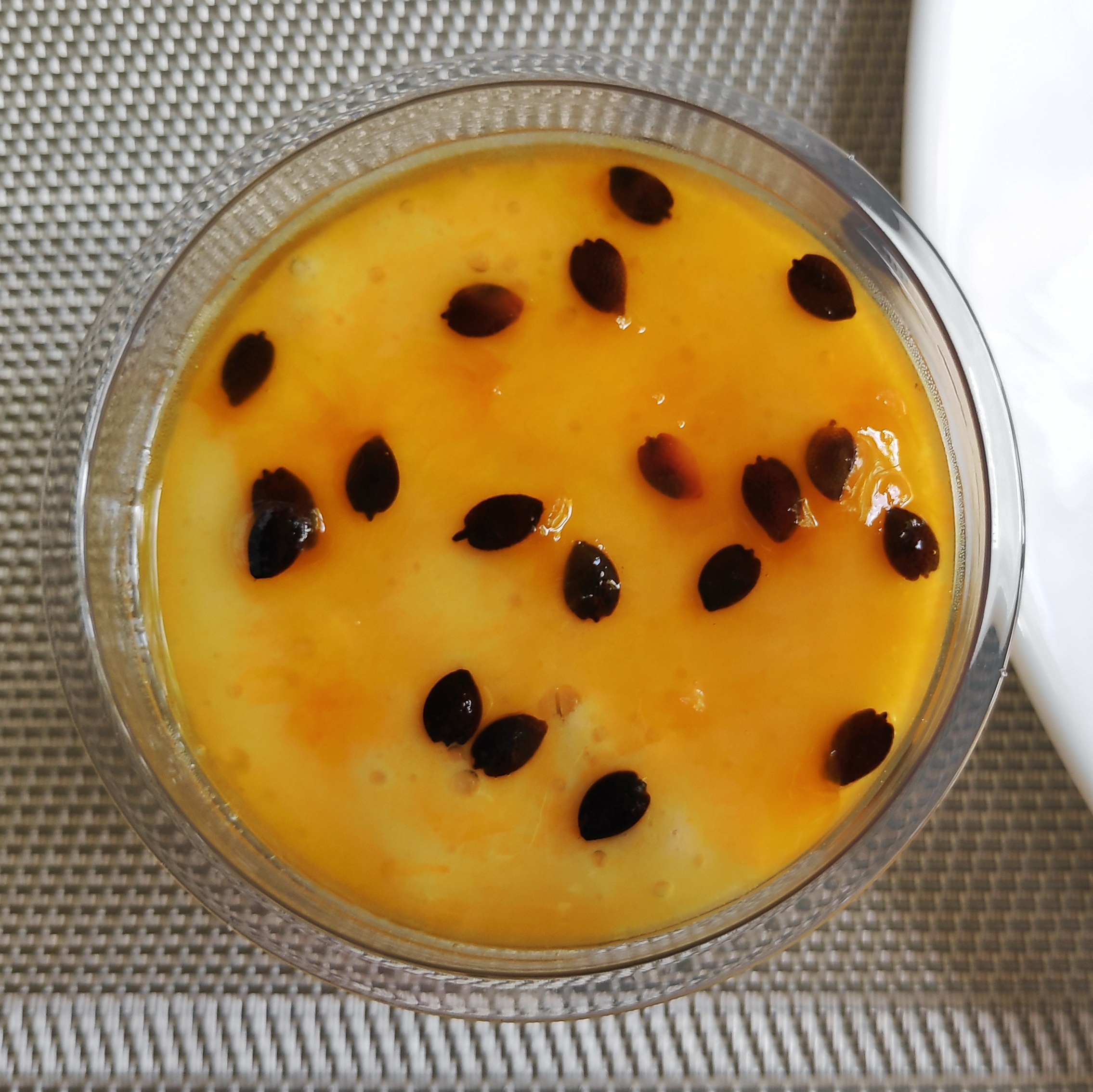
Passion fruit mousse

Brazil has a tradition of manufacturing jams and jellies from fresh tropical fruits, as Brazil is recognized worldwide as a country with great characteristics in food production, being one of the largest food exporters in the world. Brazilians inherited the taste and cultivation of sugar from the Portuguese who immigrated to Brazil. In the kitchens of the sugar farms, the wives of the farmers taught the subordinates how to properly mix the ingredients. This led to a growth in its commercialization in the Brazilian market, Portuguese recipes spread throughout the Brazilian colony and became part of the colonial food menu.

The Portuguese tradition of producing sweets with eggs and sugar joined the immense variety of Brazilian tropical fruits, which provided an immense menu of delicacies. Brazil has a variety of candies such as brigadeiros (chocolate fudge balls), cocada (a coconut sweet), beijinhos (coconut truffles and clove) and Romeu e Julieta (cheese with a guava jam known as goiabada).

Peanuts are used to make paçoca, rapadura and pé-de-moleque. Local common fruits like açaí, cupuaçu, mango, papaya, cocoa, cashew, guava, orange, passionfruit, pineapple, and hog plum are turned in juices and used to make chocolates, ice pops and ice cream.

=== Typical cakes (bolos) ===
- Pavê
- Cuca, a board cake made with eggs, wheat flour, and butter and covered with sugar, very similar to Streuselkuchen, a traditional German cuisine cake. It is typical of the southern region of Brazil.
- Nega maluca (chocolate cake with a chocolate cover and chocolate sprinkles)
- Pão de mel (honey cake, somewhat resembling gingerbread, usually covered with melted chocolate)
- Bolo de rolo (roll cake, a thin mass wrapped with melted guava)
- Bolo de cenoura (carrot cake with chocolate cover made with butter and cocoa)
- Bolo prestígio (cake covered with a version of brigadeiro, which replaces cocoa powder for grated coconut)
- Bolo de fubá (corn flour cake)
- Bolo de milho (Brazilian-style corn cake)
- Bolo de maracujá (passion fruit cake)
- Bolo de mandioca (cassava cake)
- Bolo de queijo (literally "cheese cake")
- Bolo de laranja (orange cake)
- Bolo de banana (banana cake with cinnamon drizzle)
- Bolo Souza Leão
- Bolo Marta Rocha
- Bolo de noiva
- Torta Holandesa [pt]

=== Other popular and traditional desserts ===
- Brigadeiro (a Brazilian chocolate candy, considered the most typical dessert in the country, a type of truffle made of condensed milk, butter and cocoa powder)
- Paçoca (similar to Spanish polvorones, but made with peanuts instead of almonds and without the addition of fats)
- Quindim (egg custard with coconut)
- Cocada (coconut sweet)
- Beijinho (coconut "truffles" with clove)
- Cajuzinho (peanut and cashew "truffles")
- Pudim de leite (condensed milk-based crème caramel, of French origin)
- Doce de leite
- Goiabada
- Olho-de-sogra
- Pé-de-moleque (made with peanuts and sugar caramel)
- Sagu
- Mousse de maracujá
- Queijadinha
- Creme de papaya
- Maria-mole
- Pamonha (a traditional Brazilian food made from fresh corn and milk wrapped in corn husks and boiled). It can be savoury or sweet.
- Rapadura
- Curau
- Canjica
- Torta holandesa
- "Açaí na tigela" (usually consists of an açaí (Brazilian fruit) mixture with bananas and cereal or strawberries and cereal (usually granola or muslix))
- Pudim de pão (literally "bread pudding", a pie made with bread "from yesterday" immersed in milk instead of flour (plus the other typical pie ingredients like eggs, sugar, etc.) with dried orange slices and clove)
- Manjar branco (coconut pudding with caramel cover and dried plums)
- Arroz-doce (rice pudding)
- Torta de limão (literally ’lime pie’, a shortcrust pastry with creamy lime-flavored filling)
- Brigadeirão (a pudim de leite with chocolate or a chocolate cake)
- Doce de banana or Bananada (different types of banana sweets, solid or creamy)
- Papo-de-anjo
- Avocado cream (avocado, lime and confectionery sugar; blended and chilled)
- Biscoito de polvilho
- Bolinho de chuva
- Fig, papaya, mango, orange, citron, pear, peach, pumpkin, sweet potato (among others) sweets and preserves, often eaten with solid fresh cheese or doce de leite.

== Daily meals ==
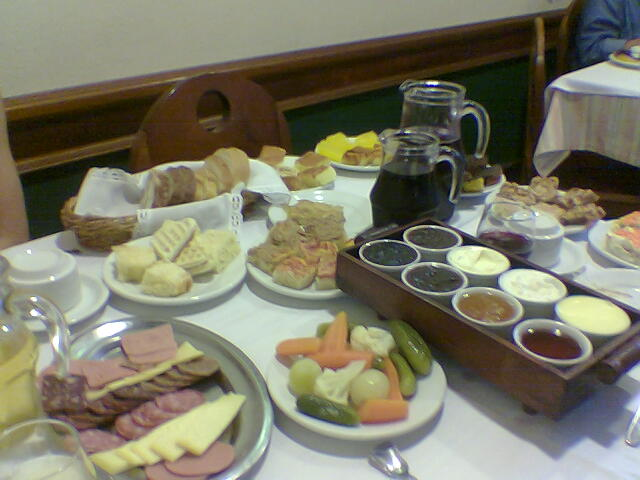
A Brazilian breakfast buffet in Gramado

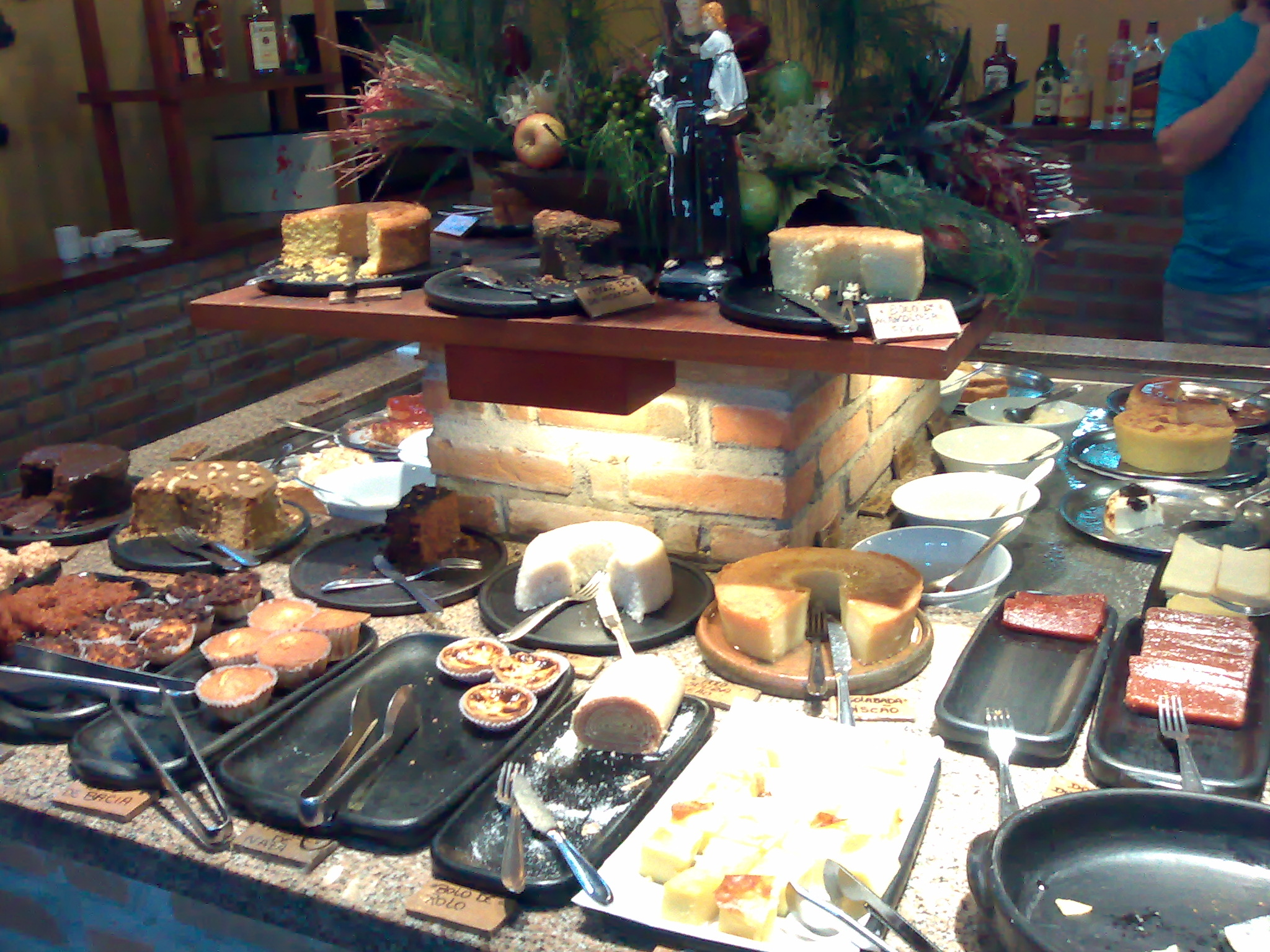
Brazilian regional food in Recife

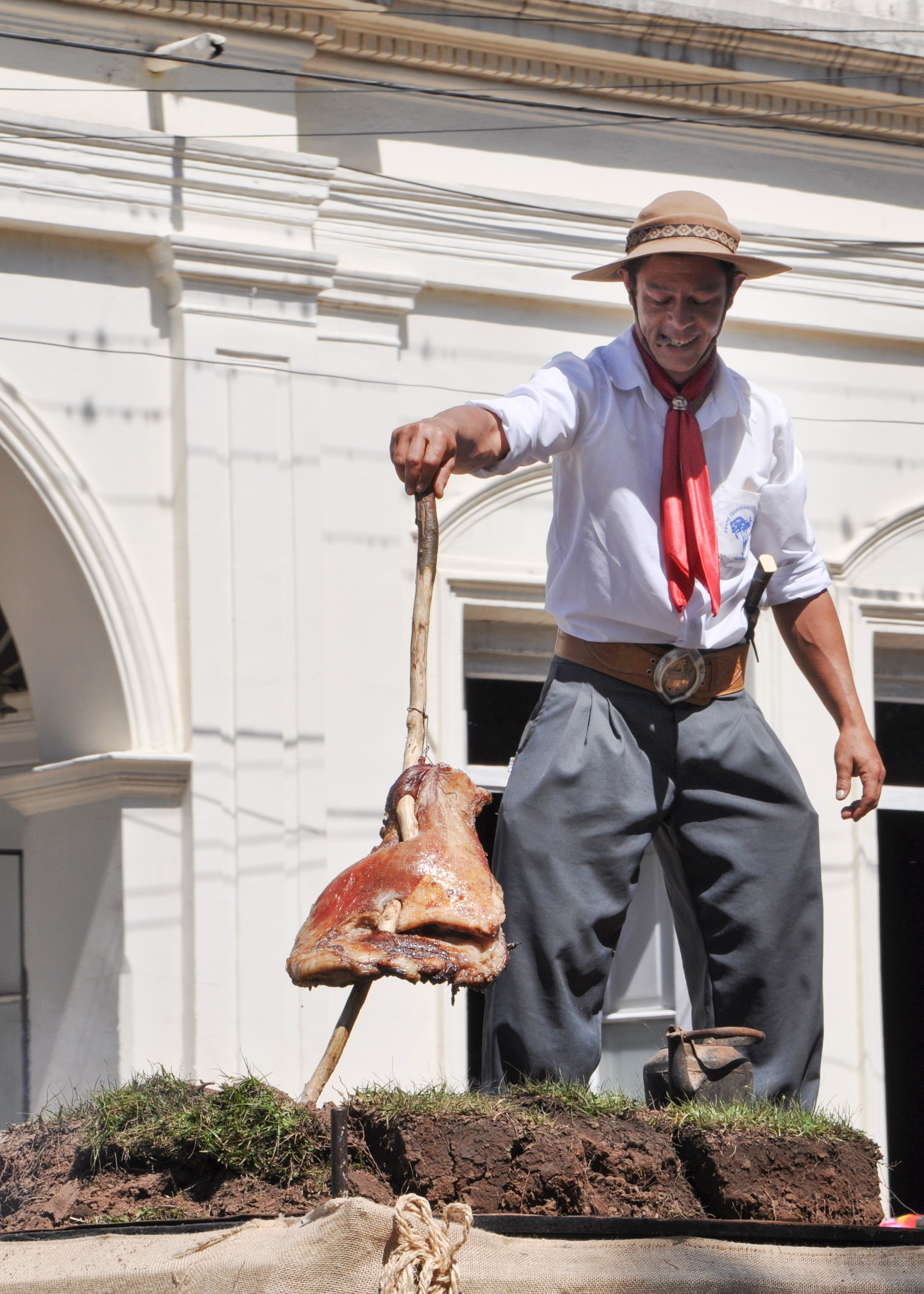
Costelada in Porto Alegre

- Breakfast, (Note: Breakfast, lunch and dinner are major meals, served in most restaurants and eaten daily in most households above the poverty line.) the café-da-manhã (literally, "morning coffee"): every region has its own typical breakfast. It usually consists of a light meal, not uncommonly only a fruit or slice of bread paired with a cup of coffee. Traditional items include tropical fruits, typical cakes, crackers, bread, butter, cold cuts, cheese, requeijão, honey, jam, doce de leite, coffee (usually sweetened and with milk), juice, chocolate milk, or tea.
- Elevenses or brunch, (Note: Brunch, tea and late suppers are secondary meals, not consistently had in most households, with the tea time meal being the most common, while elevenses and late suppers depend on the peculiarities of one's daily routine or diet.) the lanche-da-manhã (literally, "morning snack"): usually had between 9 and 11 am, consists of similar items as people have for breakfast.
- Midday dinner or lunch, the almoço: this is usually the biggest meal and the most common times range from 11 a.m. to 2 p.m. Traditionally, people will go back to their houses to have lunch with their families, although nowadays that is not possible for most people, in which case it is common to have lunch in groups at restaurants or cafeterias. Rice is a staple of the Brazilian diet, albeit it is not uncommon to eat pasta instead. It is usually eaten together with beans and accompanied by salad, protein (most commonly red meat or chicken) and a side dish, such as polenta, potatoes, corn, etc.
- Tea, the lanche-da-tarde or café-da-tarde (literally "afternoon snack" or "afternoon coffee"): it is a meal had between lunch and dinner, and basically everything people eat in the breakfast, they also eat in the afternoon snack. Nevertheless, fruits are less common.
- Night dinner or supper, the jantar: for most Brazilians, jantar is a light affair, while others dine at night. Sandwiches, soups, salads, pasta, hamburgers or hot-dogs, pizza or repeating lunchtime foods are the most common dishes.
- Late supper, the ceia: Brazilians eat soups, salads, pasta and what would be eaten at the elevenses if their jantar was a light one early at the evening and it is late at night or dawn. It is associated with Christmas and New Year's Eve.

=== Restaurant styles ===
A simple and usually inexpensive option, which is also advisable for vegetarians, is comida a quilo or comida por quilo restaurants (literally "food by kilo value"), a buffet where food is paid for by weight. Another common style is the all-you-can-eat restaurant where customers pay a prix fixe. In both types (known collectively as "self-services"), customers usually assemble the dishes of their choice from a large buffet.

Rodízio is a common style of service, in which a prix fixe is paid, and servers circulate with food. This is common in churrascarias, pizzerias and sushi (Japanese cuisine) restaurants, resulting in an all-you-can-eat meat barbecue and pizzas of varied flavours, usually one slice being served at a time.

The regular restaurant where there is a specific price for each meal is called "restaurant à la carte".

=== Vegetarian ===
Although many traditional dishes are prepared with meat or fish, it is not difficult to live on vegetarian food as well, at least in the mid-sized and larger cities of Brazil. There is a rich supply of all kinds of fruits and vegetables, and on city streets one can find cheese buns (pão de queijo); in some cities even the version made of soy.

In the 2000s, São Paulo, Rio de Janeiro and Brasília have gained several vegetarian and vegan restaurants. However outside big metropolises, vegetarianism is not very common in the country. Not every restaurant will provide vegetarian dishes and some seemingly vegetarian meals may turn out to include unwanted ingredients, for instance, using lard for cooking beans. Commonly "meat" is understood to mean "red meat", so some people might assume a vegetarian eats fish and chicken. Comida por quilo and all-you-can-eat restaurants prepare a wide range of fresh dishes. Diners can more easily find food in such restaurants that satisfy dietary restrictions.

== See also ==
- Culinary art
- Brazilian tea culture
