= Passion fruit mousse =

Fruit dessert

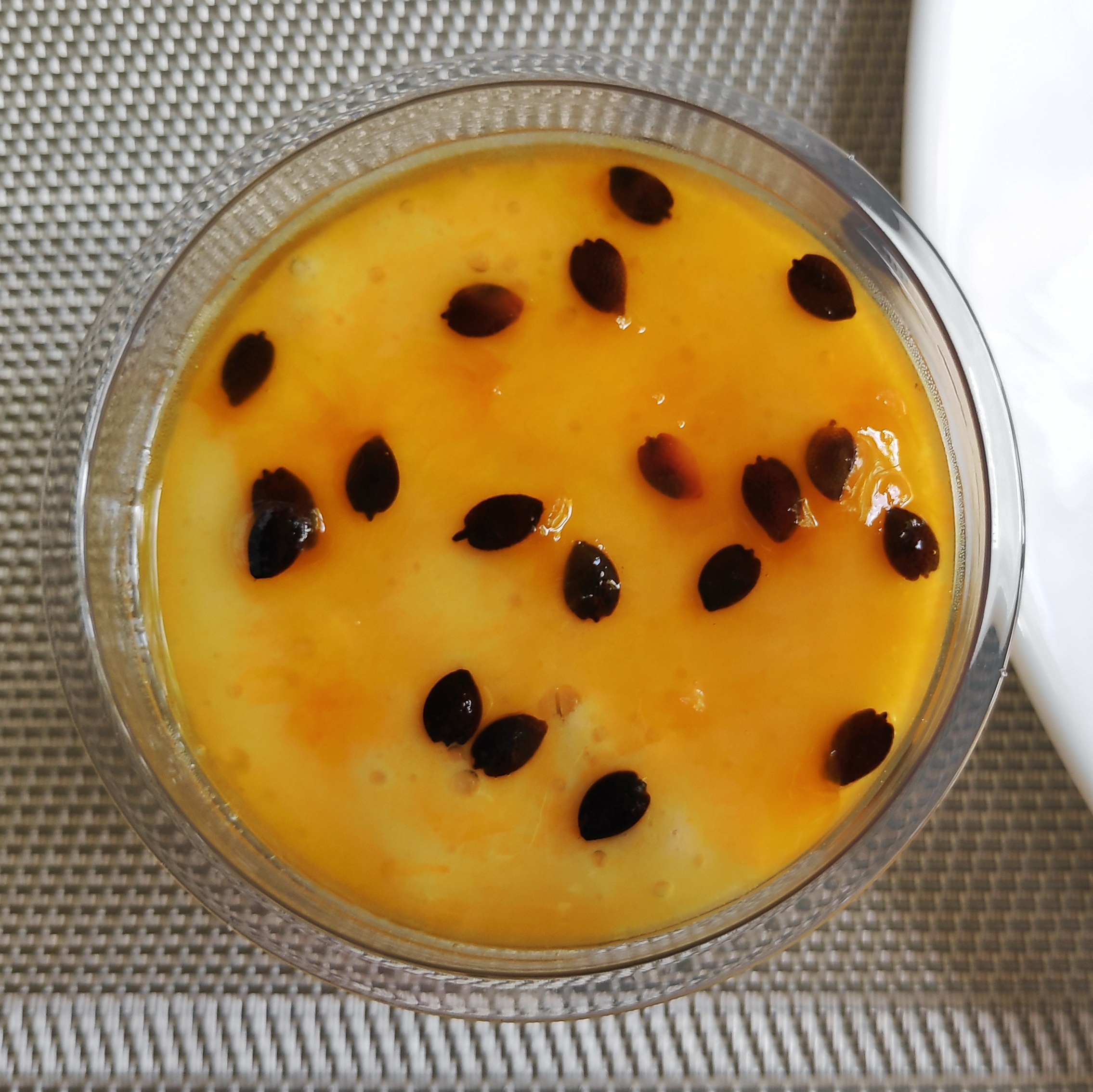
- Alternative names: Portuguese: Mousse de maracujá
- Course: Dessert
- Place of origin: Brazil and Madeira Island
- Invented: 1960s
- Cooking time: 2 hours to 3 hours
- Serving temperature: Cold
- Main ingredients: Whipped egg whites, condensed milk, passion fruit (Note: Specifically, the Brazilian form of passion fruit, Passiflora edulis f. flavicarpa, sometimes referred to as the "sour" passion fruit.)
- Similar dishes: Mousse

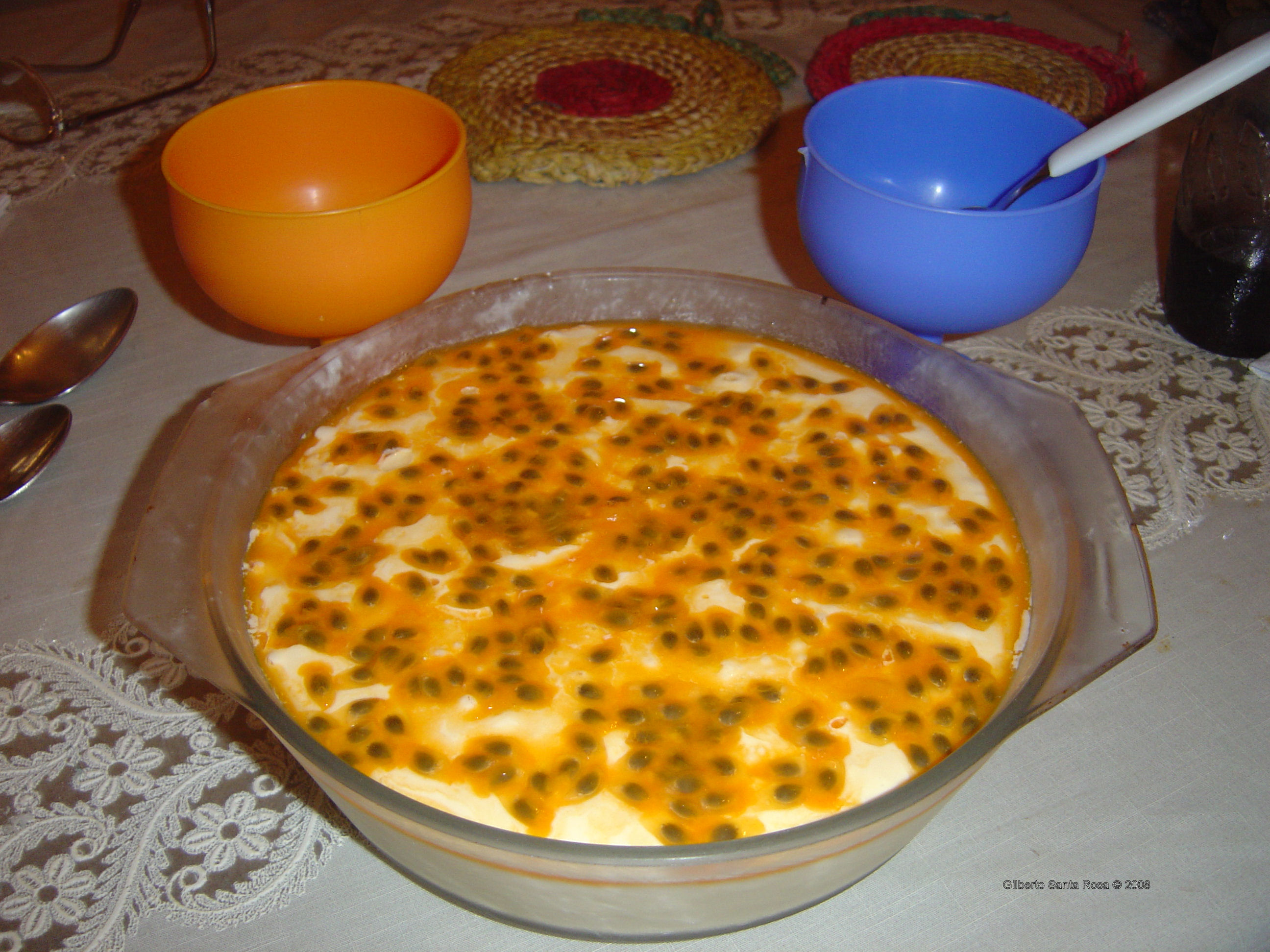
Passion fruit mousse.

Passion fruit mousse (Portuguese: mousse de maracujá, sometimes spelled musse) is a passion fruit-flavored variation of mousse from Brazilian cuisine. It is usually less aerated than traditional mousses.

Recipes vary, but it is usually prepared using gelatin, egg whites, condensed milk, and concentrated passion-fruit juice. Ingredients often also include cream, either during preparation, or alongside the prepared mousse; sugar is sometimes used as well.

== History ==
In the early 1960s the Brazilian branch of Nestlé was concerned with declining sales of Leite Moça, their condensed milk brand. Starting in 1961 Nestlé began organized culinary courses and worked with cooking schools to promote Leite Moça. It was a very successful effort: Nestlé saw an increase in usage, from less than 10% of recipes in courses integrating Leite Moça in 1961, to over 70% of courses using it in some way in 1964.

This affected Brazilian cuisine, especially the desserts: recipes that were once made very similar to their European counterparts were adapted and modified to incorporate condensed milk. In the case of the mousse, it became thicker and less aerated, with reduced cooking time.

Not long after, passion fruit mousse recipes start to appear; examples can be found as early as 1962.

== See also ==
- List of Brazilian sweets and desserts
