= Pão na chapa =

Brazilian breakfast food

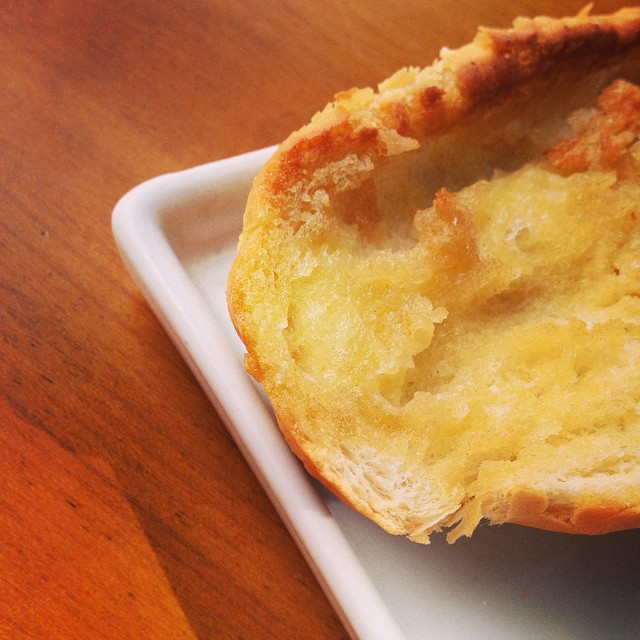
- Type: Bread
- Course: Breakfast
- Associated cuisine: Brazilian cuisine
- Serving temperature: Toasted

Pão na chapa (lit. 'Bread on the grill') is a Brazilian breakfast food that is popular in the state of São Paulo. The dish consists of a piece of pão francês cut in half and spread in butter, then pressed in the griddle or cooked in a pan. It is also common to spread requeijão on the bread and drink coffee (normally café au lait) alongside it.

The exact origins of the food item are uncertain, but it is speculated that it was created and popularized in the city of São Paulo.

== Gallery ==
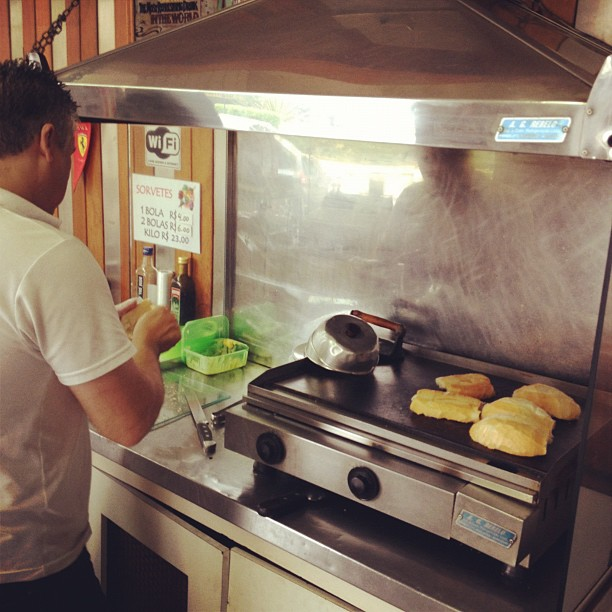
Pão na chapa being prepared on a grill
