= Galinhada =

Brazilian chicken and rice dish

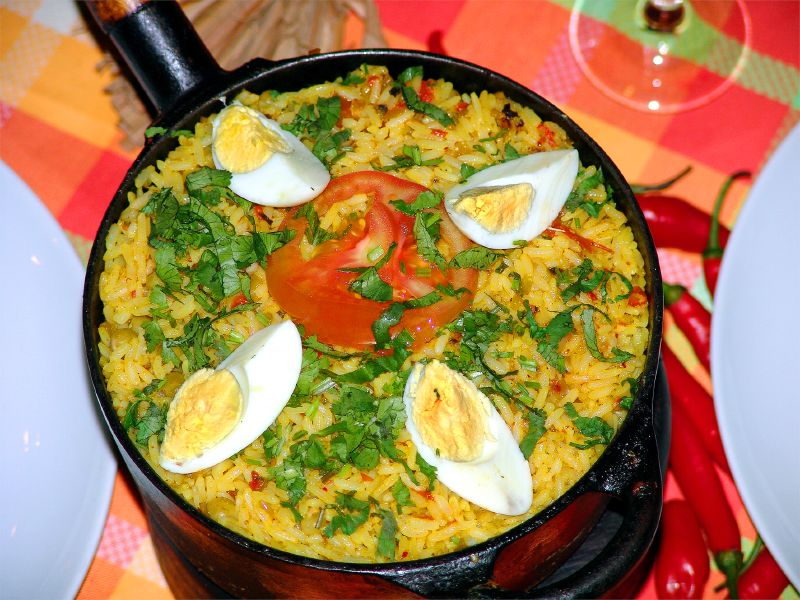
- Galinhada
- Type: Stew
- Main ingredients: Rice, chicken

Galinhada is a stew of rice with chicken, which is a typical Brazilian dish in the states of São Paulo, Goiás, Paraná and Minas Gerais.

The name comes from galinha, Portuguese for "chicken", and is pronounced [ɡalĩˈɲadɐ].

== See also ==
- Chicken and rice (disambiguation)
- Feijoada
- List of Brazilian dishes
- List of chicken dishes
- List of stews
