= Arroz carreteiro =

Brazilian rice and meat dish

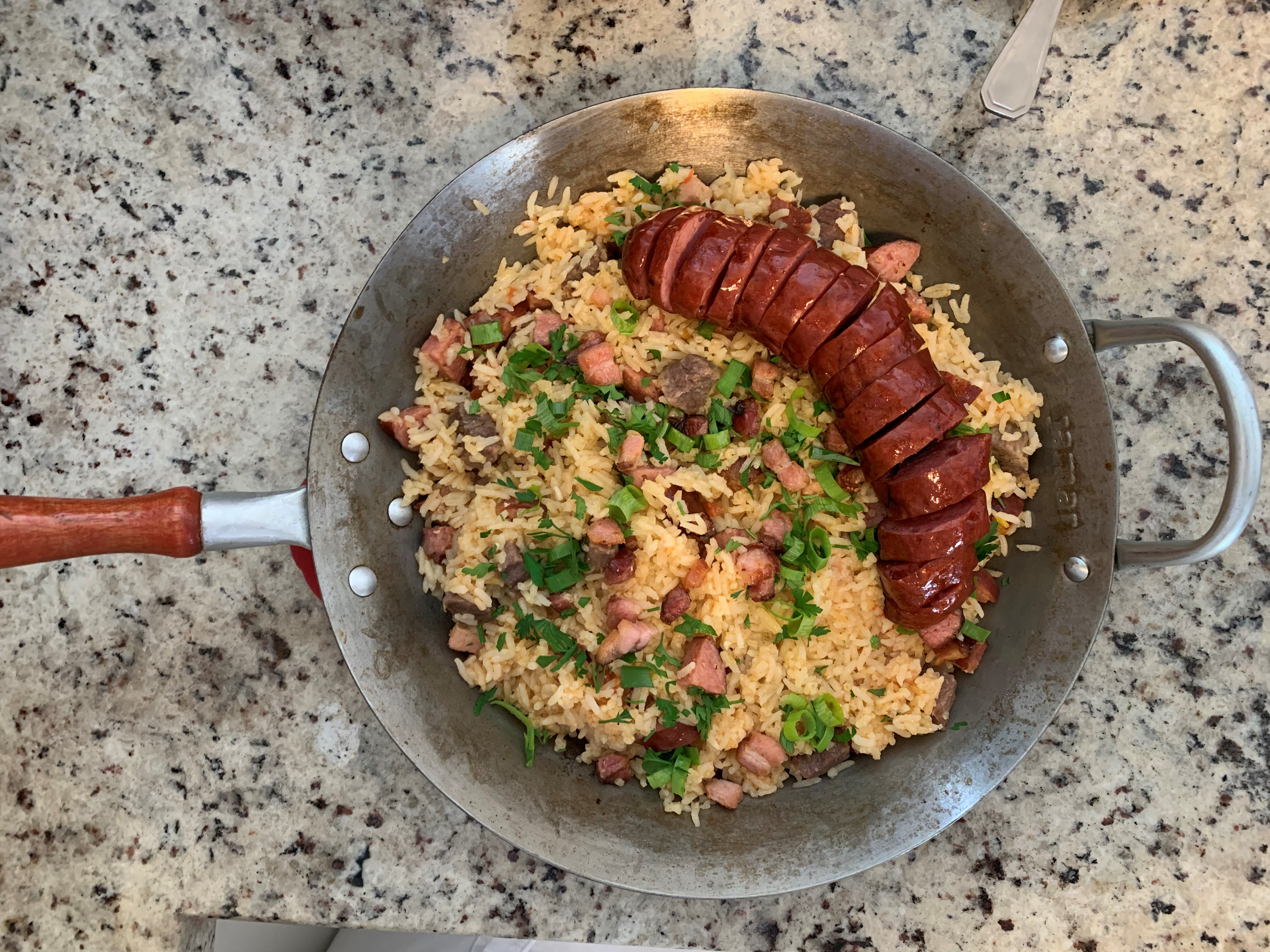
- Type: Rice dish
- Place of origin: Brazil
- Region or state: Rio Grande do Sul
- Associated cuisine: Brazilian cuisine
- Main ingredients: Rice, beef or carne-seca, linguiça, onion, garlic, and parsley

Arroz carreteiro ("wagoner's rice", in Portuguese) or carreteiro rice is a dish from the Brazilian state of Rio Grande do Sul which has become popular throughout Brazil. It is made of a rice base to which shredded or cubed beef is added as well as carne-seca or carne-de-sol, paio, bacon or linguiça, a type of sausage. The dish is traditionally flavoured with garlic, onions, tomato and parsley. In the Central-West Region and the Northeast of Brazil, arroz carreteiro is also known as maria-isabel and it is prepared with carne-de-sol.

== Origin and background ==
The Portuguese word carreteiro translates to wagon driver. Arroz carreteiro was originally prepared by wagoners who travelled through Rio Grande do Sul on ox carts transporting goods throughout the state. The drivers prepared a simple, practical dish consisting of dried, salted meat mixed with rice. The dish was typically consumed on long solitary journeys, as the cart driver would only have access to freshly cooked meat once he reached a village or settlement after many days on the road.

Without refrigeration, the carter was limited to using a dried, salted meat known as carne-de-sol, a type of jerky also known in Rio Grande do Sul as charque. Its shelf stability made it ideal for the extended journeys a carreteiro would undertake.

The traditional arroz carreteiro made with charque in a cast iron pot is one of the main dishes of the state of Rio Grande do Sul. Modern versions are often made with fresh beef, chopped or minced, or leftover meat from churrasco.
