= Bobó de camarão =

Brazilian shrimp chowder

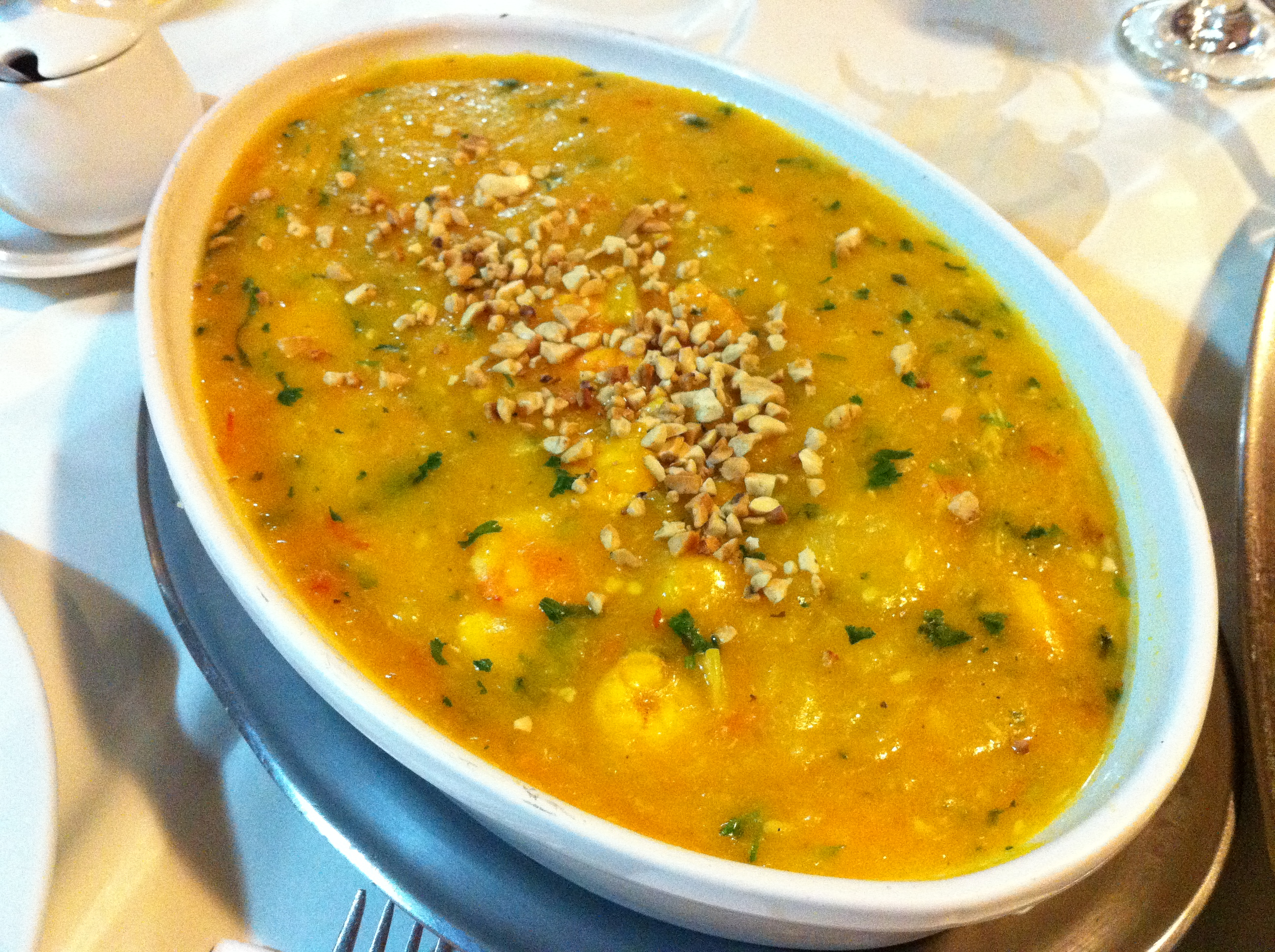
- Bobó de camarão
- Type: Chowder
- Place of origin: Bahia, Brazil
- Associated cuisine: Brazilian cuisine
- Main ingredients: Manioc meal, coconut milk, and shrimp

Bobó de camarão (Portuguese pronunciation: [bɔˈbɔ di kɐ̃mɐˈɾɐ̃w]), sometimes referred to as shrimp bobó in English, is a chowder-like Brazilian dish of shrimp in a purée of manioc meal with coconut milk, herbs, ginger, red palm oil, and other ingredients.

== Origin ==
Shrimp bobó is nearly identical to the West African dish Ipetê, and it is one of the many iconic recipes from the Bahia region, which is known for its heavy Afro-Brazilian characteristics. The name bobó comes from the Fon word bovô.

== Preparation ==
Like many similar dishes, it is flavored with palm oil, called dendê in Brazilian Portuguese. It is traditionally served with white rice, but it may also be served with another manioc dish called pirão or with the ritual Candomblé dish acaçá. It can also be treated as a standalone side dish.

In the state of Espírito Santo, bobó de camarão is prepared with olive oil instead of palm oil due to Italian influences.

== See also ==
- List of Brazilian dishes
- List of cream soups
