= Bolo Souza Leão =

Brazilian cake from Pernambuco

- Type: Cake
- Place of origin: Brazil
- Region or state: Pernambuco
- Created by: Rita de Cássia Souza Leão (claimed)
- Invented: 1849 or 1859

Bolo Souza Leão is a cake from the Brazilian state of Pernambuco. The cake is recognized as cultural and intangible heritage of Pernambuco.

== History ==
The cake is named after the Sousa Leão family, a notable Brazilian family who owned sugar mills in Northeastern Brazil during the Brazilian sugar cycle, who are credited for its creation. The cake has multiple competing origin stories. One potential origin given by Globo Repórter tells that the cake may have been created at Engenho São Bartolomeu in Jaboatão dos Guararapes by Rita de Cássia Souza Leão, a member of the Souza Leão family, as a way to use local ingredients rather than imported ones. Another possible origin given by the same source tells that it was created on 18 December 1849 at Engenho Moreno in Moreno, Pernambuco by a member of the Souza Leão family to receive Brazilian emperor Pedro II.

One origin detailed by Brazilian researcher Neide Shinohara and the Diário do Rio tells that the cake was created at Engenho Moreno by Rita de Cássia Souza Leão in 1859 to receive emperor Pedro II and empress Teresa Cristina during one of their trips through Northeastern Brazil. The recipe was a closely guarded family secret, known only to the women, and the cake was never sold. Brazilian anthropologist Gilberto Freyre met with representatives of the Souza Leão family in the 1960s and convinced them to share the recipe.

== Composition and recognition ==
The original recipe called for sugar, salt, puba (fermented cassava paste), butter, coconut milk, a large quantity of eggs, (Note: One source claims that the original recipe called for 24 egg yolks.) cinnamon, cloves, and anise seeds.

After the passage of Law Nº 13,428 of 16 April 2008, Bolo Souza Leão was recognized as Patrimônio Cultural e Imaterial (cultural and intangible heritage) of Pernambuco. In January 2026, Sebrae Pernambuco gathered producers of various regional dishes to work with the Associação da Confeitaria de Pernambuco as the legal representative to apply for Geographical indication status. Bolo Souza Leão is one of the dishes included in this initiative.

The cake can traditionally be found at Festa Juninas in Pernambuco.
