= Avoador =

Cassava biscuits

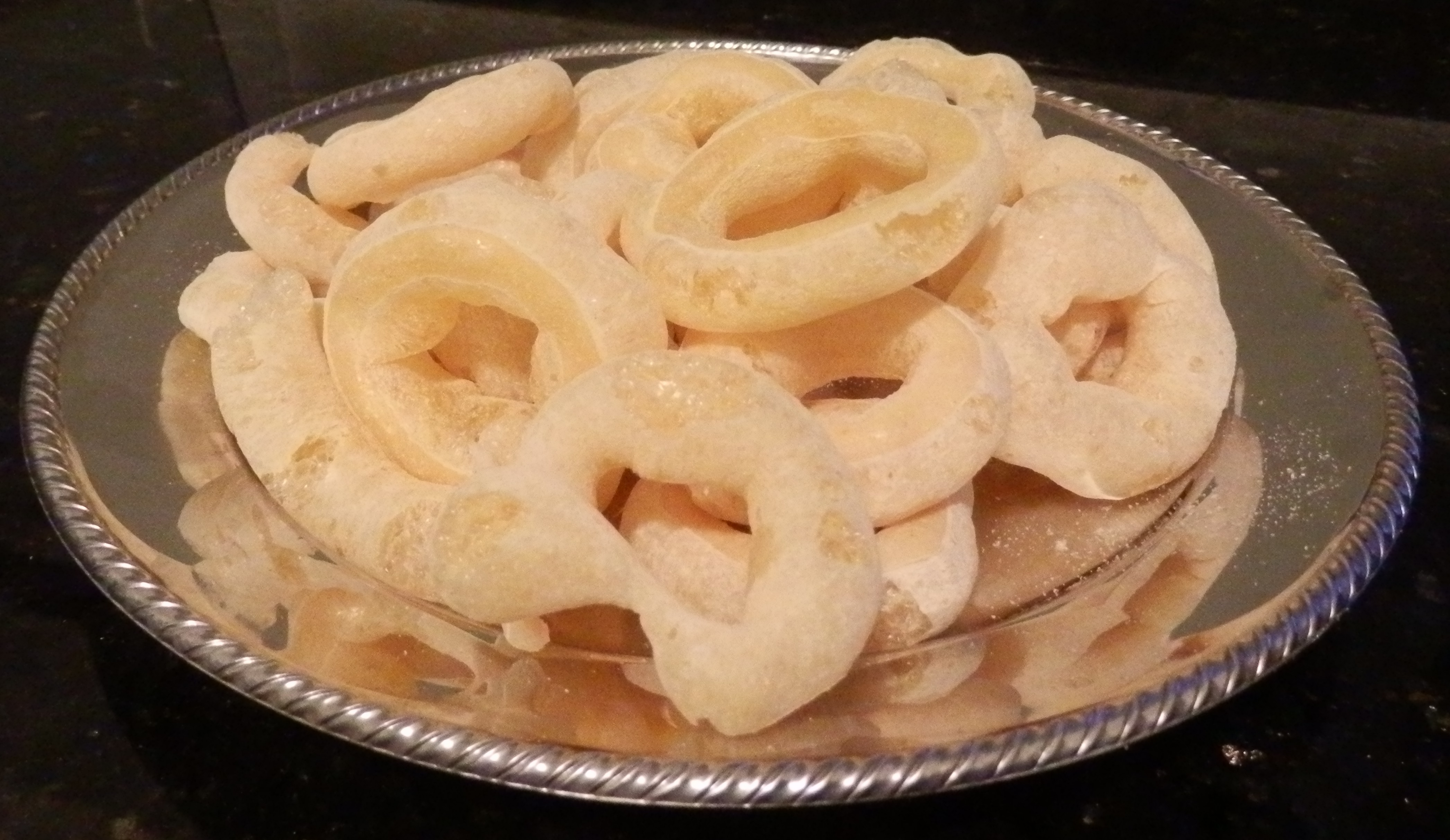
- Ring-shaped biscoitos de polvilho
- Place of origin: Brazil
- Main ingredients: Water, milk, oil, and cassava starch

Avoador, often referred to as the generic name biscoito de polvilho and also known as biscoito de vento (air biscuit), peta, or biscoito voador (flying biscuit), is a Brazilian snack food that is typical of Minas Gerais and the cuisine of Central-West Brazil. Its basic ingredients are water, milk, oil, and cassava starch.

They are popular all throughout Brazil, but especially in the northeast and southeast. One popular brand is Biscoito Globo sold on the beaches of Rio de Janeiro.

== Origins ==
The recipe's exact origins are unknown. According to historian Luís da Câmara Cascudo, the biscuit was already prepared for rural landowners in 18th century Minas Gerais by farm cooks.
