= Virado =

Brazilian dish

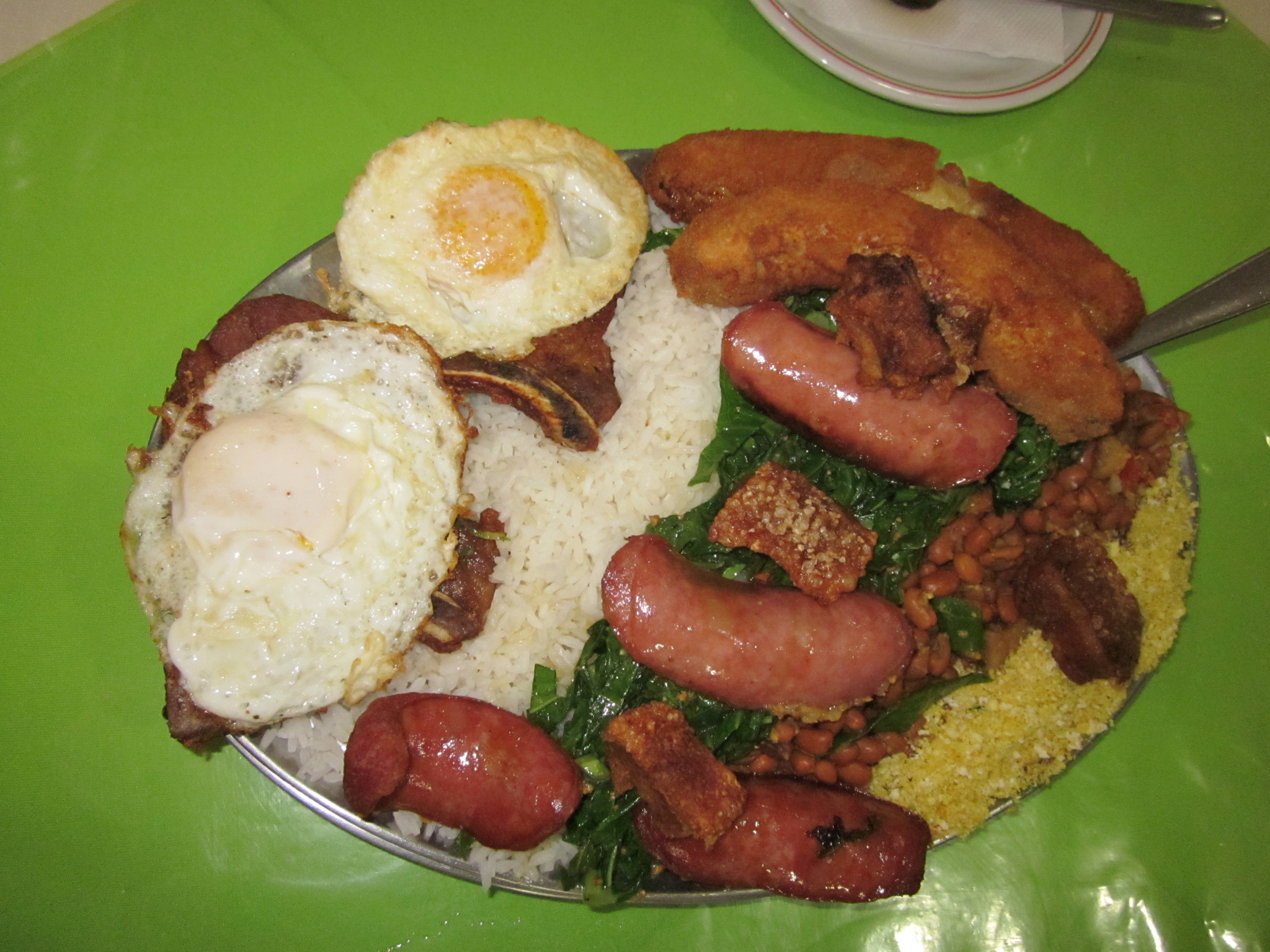
- Virado à Paulista
- Type: Platter
- Place of origin: Brazil
- Main ingredients: beans, pork, manioc flour, fried sausage; breaded and fried plantain, eggs, kale, rice, torresmo (a crisply cooked pork rind)

Virado, also known as virado à Paulista, is a complete meal from the state of São Paulo, Brazil. It dates to the time of the earliest Portuguese settlers to the region. The dish consists of a platter of beans cooked in sautéed onion, garlic, fat, and salt; dried, toasted manioc flour; a pork chop; fried sausage; breaded and fried plantain; eggs, preferably with a soft yolk; kale, cut into strips and braised in fat; rice; and torresmo, a crisply cooked pork rind. Virado is traditionally served on Mondays. About 500,000 plates of the dish are served per week in the city of São Paulo.

== History ==
Virado arose spontaneously during the early colonial period of Brazil as a dish of the bandeirantes. The bandeirantes traveled to the interior of Brazil to capture and enslave native Brazilians at first, and later to find gold, silver, and diamonds. They carried beans, pork, and corn flour in their backpacks to the interior of the state. Stored in the backpack, the ingredients "turned" (Portuguese: virar) and mixed, hence the name of the dish, "virado". Virado in the period of the bandeirantes consisted only of beans, usually cooked without salt so as not to harden them, maize flour, dried meat, and bacon. Cassava flour was substituted for corn flour after the introduction of the crop to the São Paulo region in the 18th century. The bandeirantes and other early settlers ate virado cold or warmed.

The earliest written reference to virado is in 1602, when Nicolau Barreto made an expedition to present-day Paraguay, Bolivia, and Peru. It is also associated with the monção, expeditions by river to resupply remote areas of the Brazilian interior from the early 18th to the early 19th century.

The dish became a staple of homes and farmsteads in the São Paulo region. Homes in São Paulo in the early colonial period were basic and lacked the elegance of those in Bahia, Pernambuco, or Rio de Janeiro. Virado was served at all times of the day with little variation; in this period it consisted of beans, bacon, flour, a piece of pork, smoked linguiça, and kale. Rice was introduced to virado in the 19th century after the wide-scale introduction of the crop in Brazil; it was cooked in the remains of cooked pork or sausage, and additionally flavored with lard, garlic, and salt. Dessert served with virado consisted of fresh fruit such as oranges; bananas fried with cinnamon and sugar were also common.

Dom Pedro I ate virado on August 17, 1822, at Fazenda Pau d'Alho, in São José do Barreiro, Vale do Paraíba on the trip from Rio de Janeiro to São Paulo.

== Variations ==
There are several variations of virado, either around the basic ensemble of pork, fried banana, beans mashed with cassava flour, rice, kale, and fried egg. The virado can be prepared with black beans and corn flour.

An early variation of the dish emerged when the bandeirantes turned their expeditions to Minas Gerais, where the dish became known as tutu à mineira. Tutu à mineira differs from Virado in its use of ground beans; the version in São Paulo uses whole beans. One variation served in the interior of the state of Santa Catarina substitutes cooked cabbage for kale.
