= Bife à parmegiana =

Brazilian dish

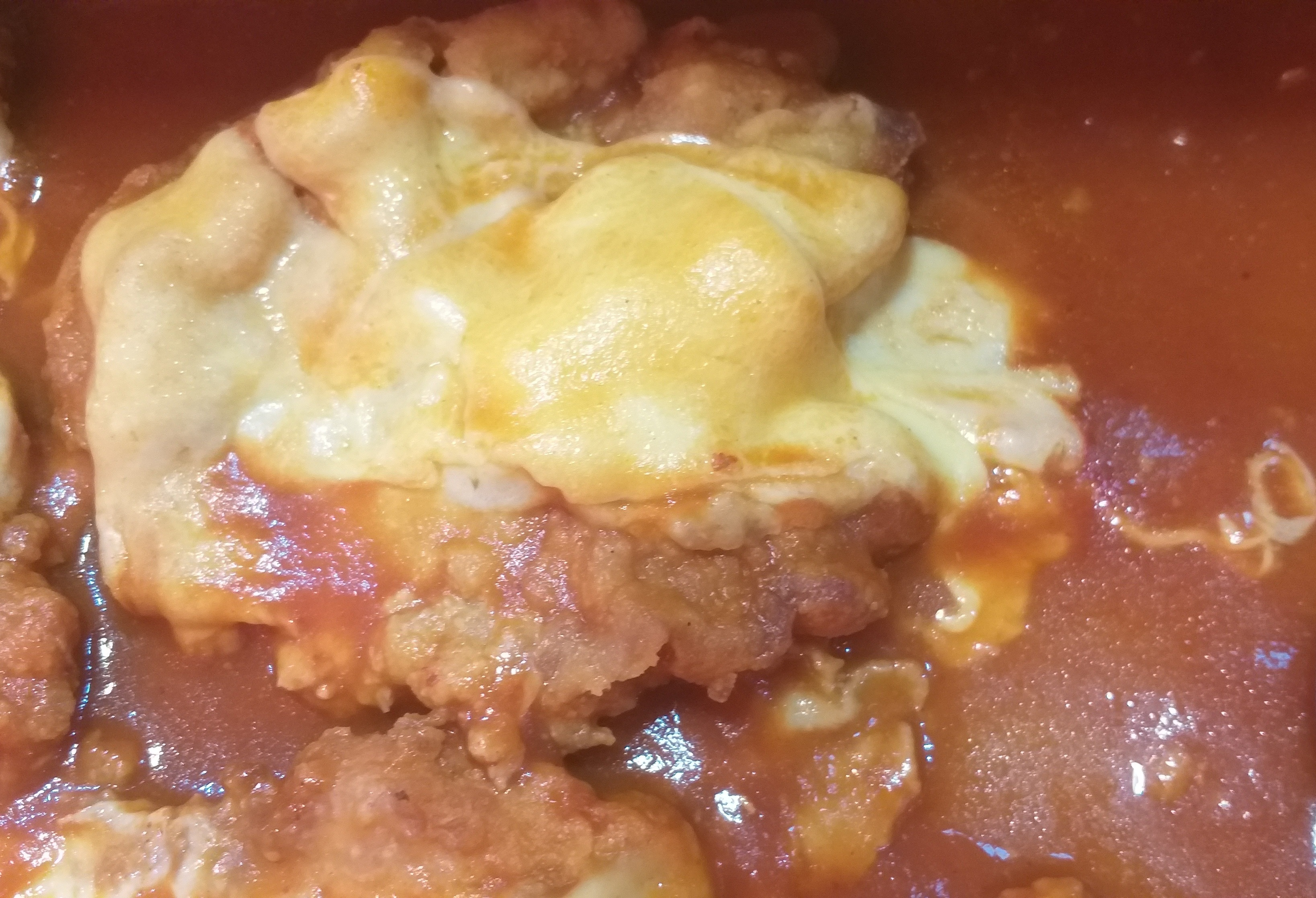
Chicken à parmegiana

Bife à parmegiana, or filé à parmegiana, is a Brazilian dish, originally from São Paulo. Popularized throughout Brazil, it is a type of fried steak, consisting of a sliced piece of meat, breaded with wheat flour and eggs (egg white), covered with mozzarella cheese, slices of ham and parmesan. It is topped with plenty of tomato sauce and condiments such as oregano to taste. Although it is a dish invented in São Paulo, Brazil, it is often, even in the country itself, mistakenly considered an Italian recipe judging by the name.
