= Xiao mi la pepper =

Chili pepper cultivar

'Xiao Mi La Pepper'
- Genus: Capsicum
- Species: Capsicum frutescens
- Cultivar: 'Xiao Mi La'
- Heat: Very hot
- Scoville scale: 75,000 SHU

Xiao mi la pepper
- Chinese: 小米辣
- Literal meaning: "Little Rice Chili"
Transcriptions

Xiao mi la (小米辣, literally "millet pepper") is a cultivar of Capsicum frutescens found in southern China. The Xiao Mi La pepper is often cited as one of the three most commonly used peppers in Chinese cuisines, along with facing heaven chilli and two vitex chilli. It is also known in China as "Thai Pepper", although that is a name used in other parts of the world for a different chili cultivar than Xiao mi la. Xiao mi la is the only wild pepper species in China, where it has naturalized in the southern Yunnan Province of China as a perennial shrub. Xiao mi la is adapted to this environment of high temperature and humidity, as well as resistance to East Asian disease pressures, low light, and barren soil.

== Spice ==
Xiao Mi La is one of the spiciest widely available peppers at Beijing wet markets and grocery stores. Xiao mi la is used in spicy Sichuan dishes like Lazi Dry Pepper Chicken Wings, Mala Xiang Guo (stir-fried hotpot, cooked twice), and Shangxin Ban Kongxincai (tragically hot water spinach salad). Xiao mi la is also processed into flakes and powders.

== See also ==
- List of Capsicum cultivars
