= Mozambican cuisine =

Culinary traditions of Mozambique

The cuisine of Mozambique represents a mixture of indigenous foods and cooking practices, coupled with outside influences from Indian Ocean trade and Portuguese colonization.

== History ==
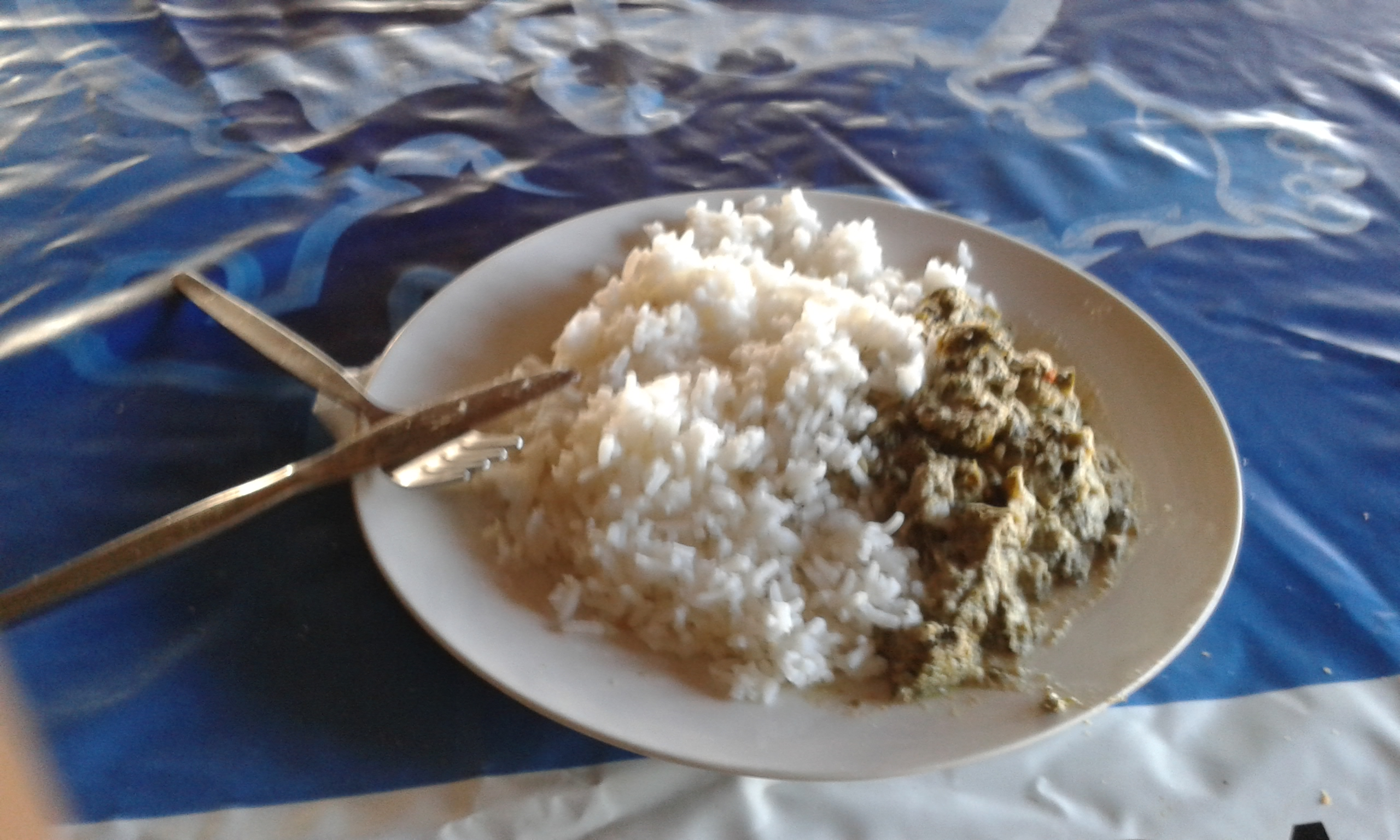
Matapa, a stew of cassava leaves cooked with peanut or coconut milk, often served with rice

=== Indigenous foods and techniques ===
Prior to Portuguese colonization and the Columbian exchange, millet and sorghum were the primary grains in Mozambique. They retain some presence, though maize has largely displaced them as a staple food over the last few decades.

=== Portuguese influence: new crops ===
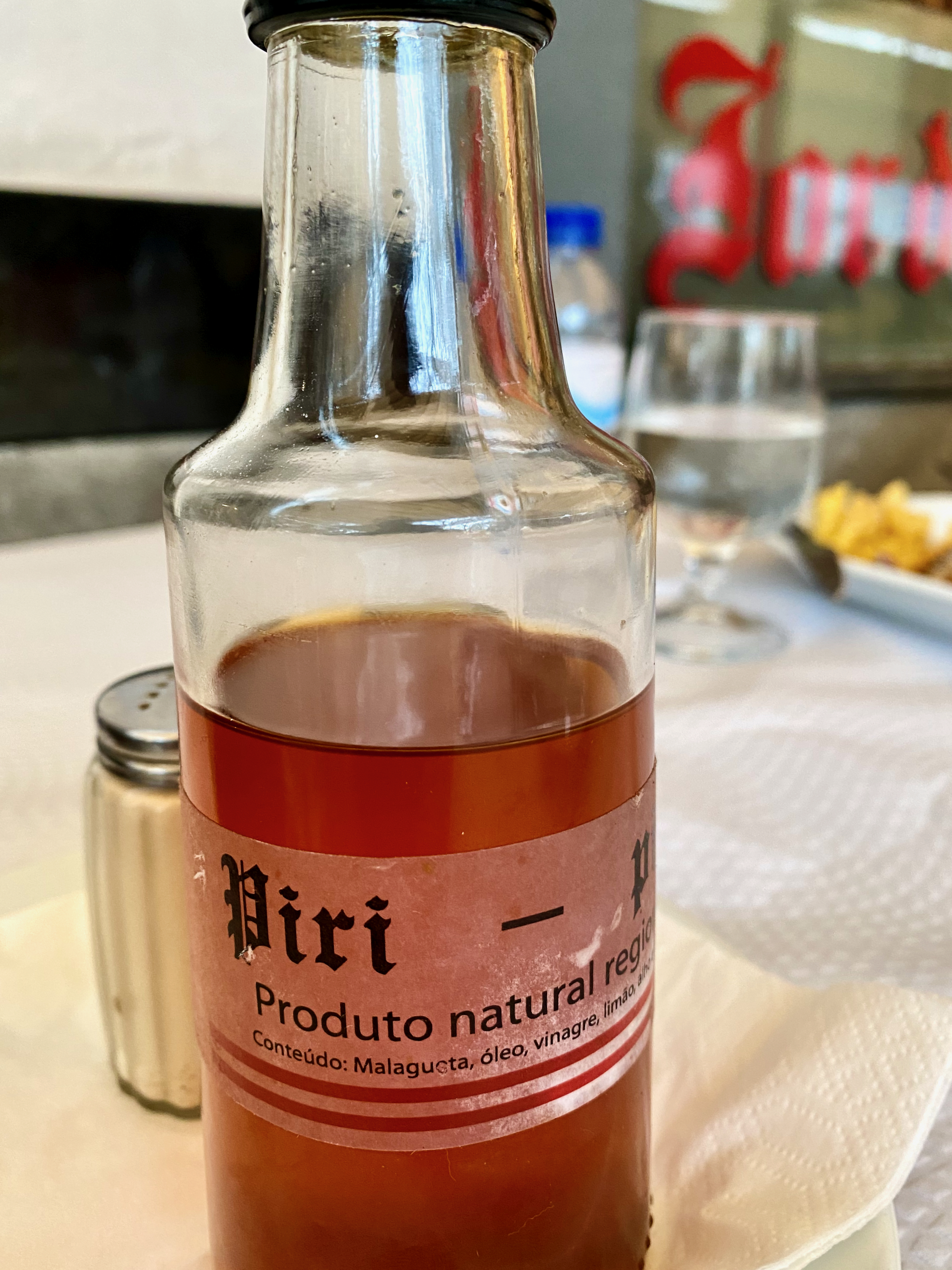
Piri-piri sauce, a combination of oil, garlic, lemon, and piri-piri chili peppers

Mozambican cuisine has deeply been influenced by the Portuguese, who introduced new crops, flavorings, and cooking methods. The importation of new crops has arguably had the most significant effect of any Portuguese influence; maize, tomatoes, (sweet) potatoes, peppers, and cassava are all non-native crops that have become core components of the Mozambican diet.

Cooking techniques with Portuguese influence include the refogado, a base of tomatoes, onions, garlic, and piri-piri sauteed in vegetable oil. Sweet coconut puddings and candies are also common, possibly as a Portuguese influence.

=== Indian (Ocean) influence: curry and seafood ===
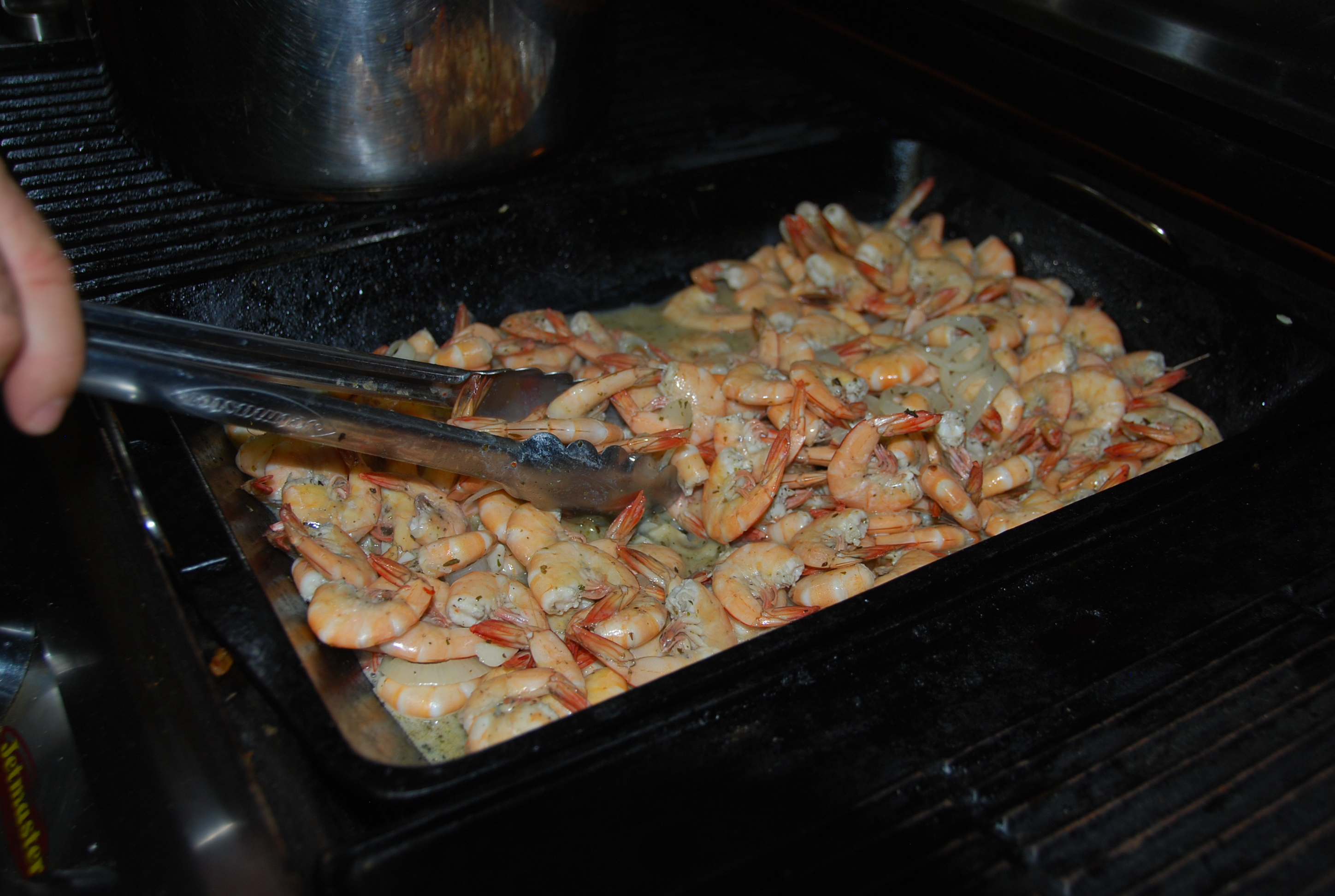
Cooking prawns in Mozambique

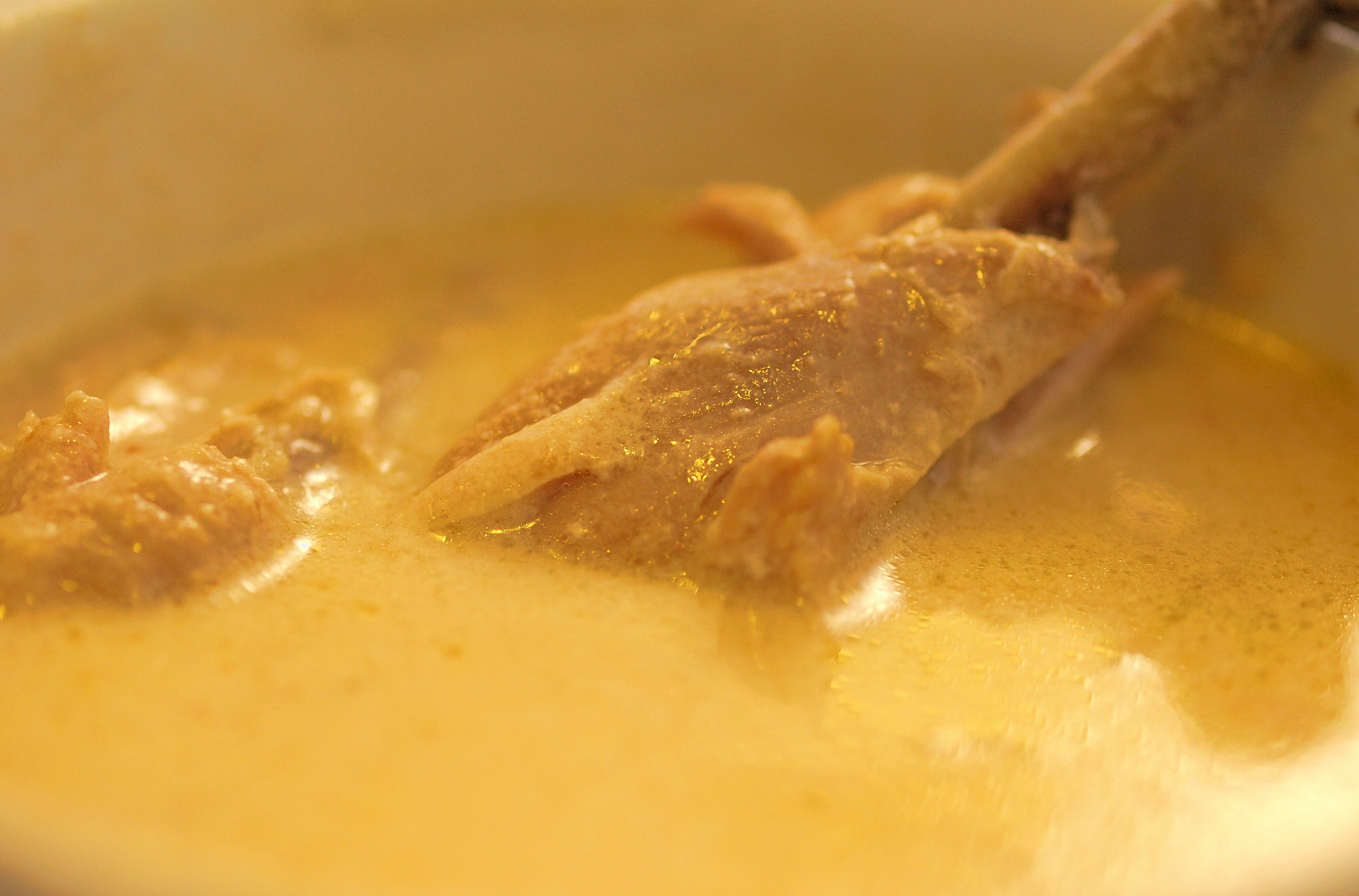
Caril de amendoim, a Mozambican peanut curry

"Curry" is considered one of Mozambique's national dishes, but is loosely defined as some combination of shrimp, fish, meat, or vegetables cooked in a sauce, that does not necessarily contain curry powder. Goanese influences (from Goa, a fellow Portuguese colony in India) have connected curry and coconut in Mozambican food. Peanut can also be used as a thickener for curries, especially in southern Mozambique.

Other non-native crops that were imported from India and further east include oranges, lemons, a range of spices, and possibly sugarcane and bananas.

== Common food and drink ==
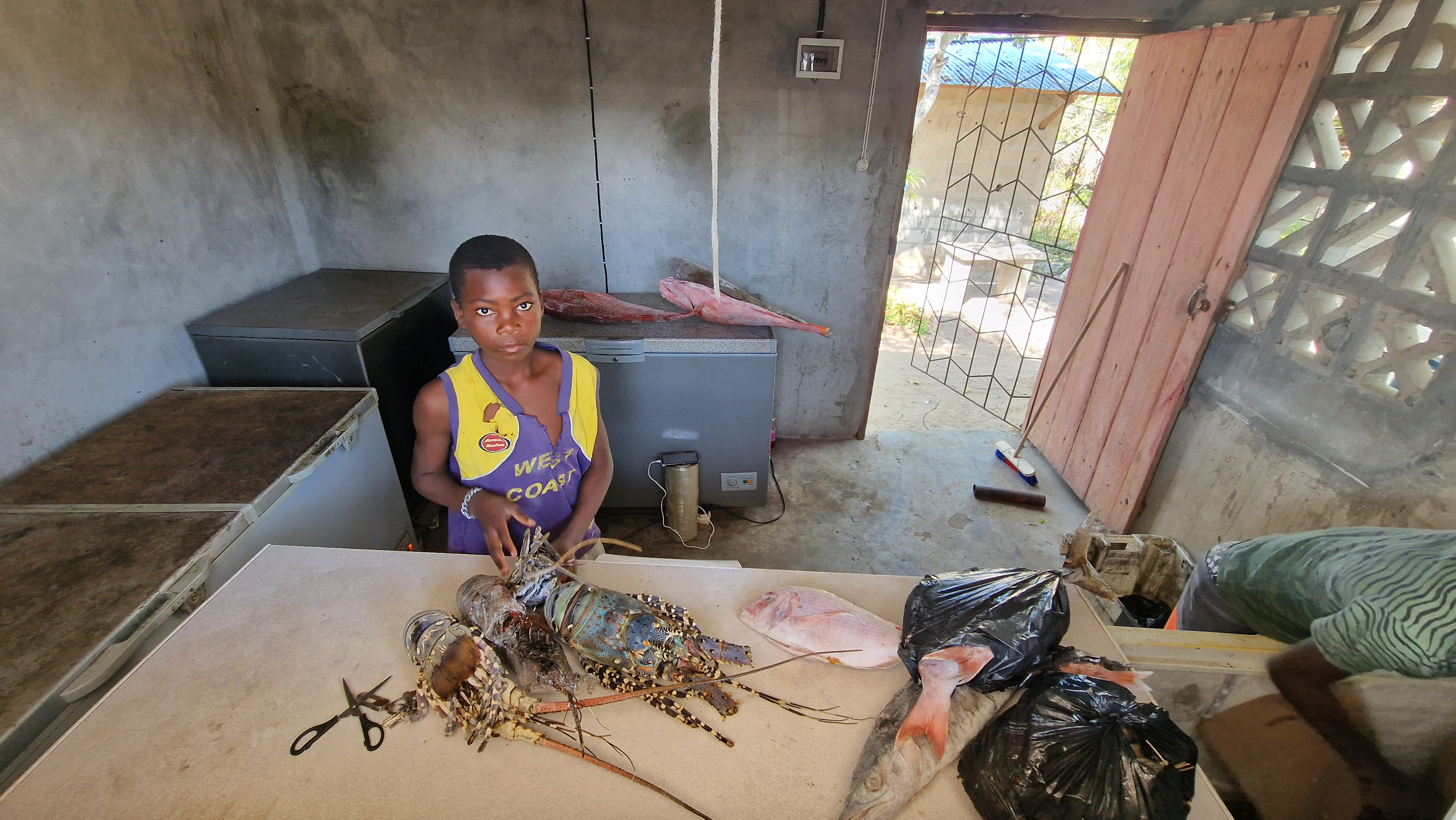
Lobsters for sale at a market in Mozambique

The staple food for many Mozambicans is xima (shi-mah), a thick porridge made from maize/corn flour. Cassava and rice are also eaten as staple carbohydrates. All of these are served with sauces of vegetables, meat, beans or fish. Other typical ingredients include cashew nuts, onions, bay leaves, garlic, coriander, paprika, pepper, red pepper, sugar cane, corn, millet, sorghum and potatoes.

One of the most well-known Mozambican dishes is known as matapa, a stew dish made of cassava leaves, ground peanuts, onions, tomatoes, red chili flakes, sometimes with seafood like shrimp, and commonly served over rice.

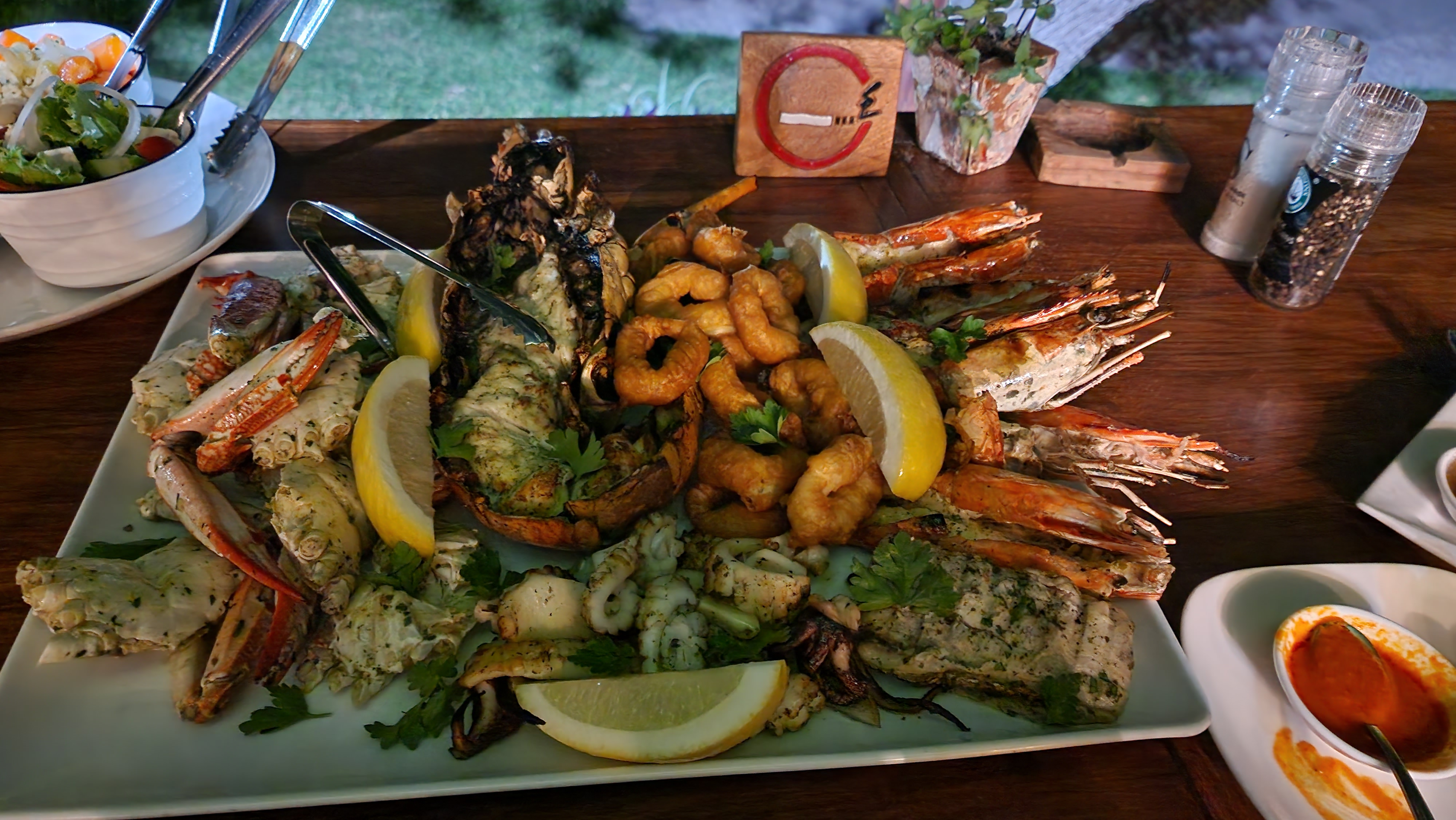
Grilled Mozambican seafood platter with prawns and lobster

As Mozambique is a coastal nation, the cuisine includes a lot of seafood, and many dishes have Indian influences from pre- and post-colonization Indian Ocean trade contacts. Curry dishes (caril de camarao, shrimp curry), and chamussas (the Mozambican version of samosa) are common Mozambican dishes with Indian influences. Many dishes are also made with coconut milk, including Frango a Zambeziana, a spicy chicken dish with coconut milk. Rice is a common ingredient. A bolo polana is a cake made of cashew and potatoes.

=== Major dishes ===
- mango or lemon achar: salt-fermented fruit with piri-piri
- bebinca: a dense layer cake
- matapa: a stew of cassava leaves and peanut/coconut milk
- mucapata: rice, beans, and coconut milk
- xiguinha: a thick mixture of cassava, peanut, and coconut milk, to which other ingredients can be added
- tocossado: fish baked in a chili, mango, and tomato sauce
- matata: a dish of clams, nuts, and greens
- piri-piri sauce: a chili sauce based on the piri-piri pepper, with oil, garlic, and lemon

== Gallery ==
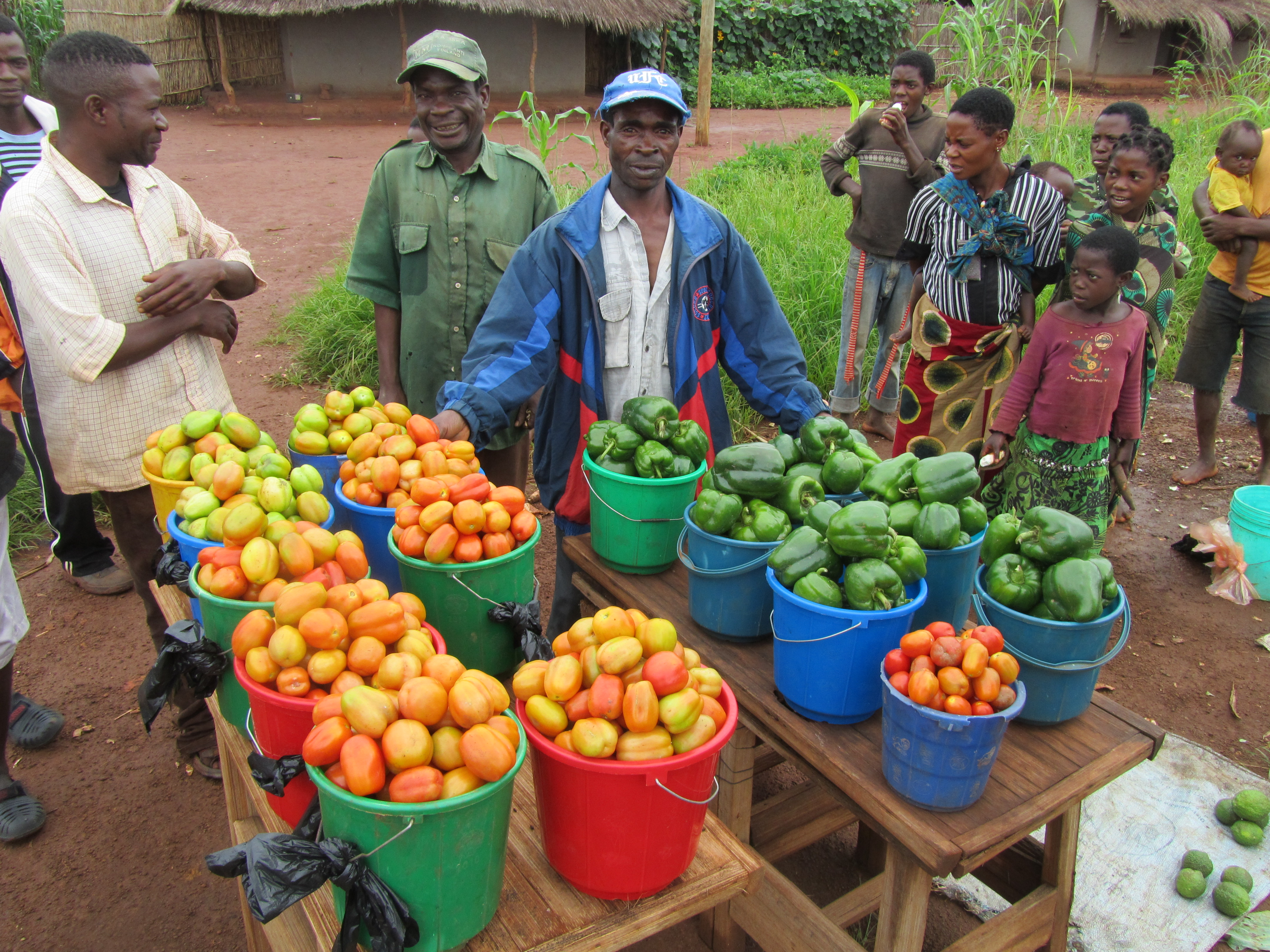
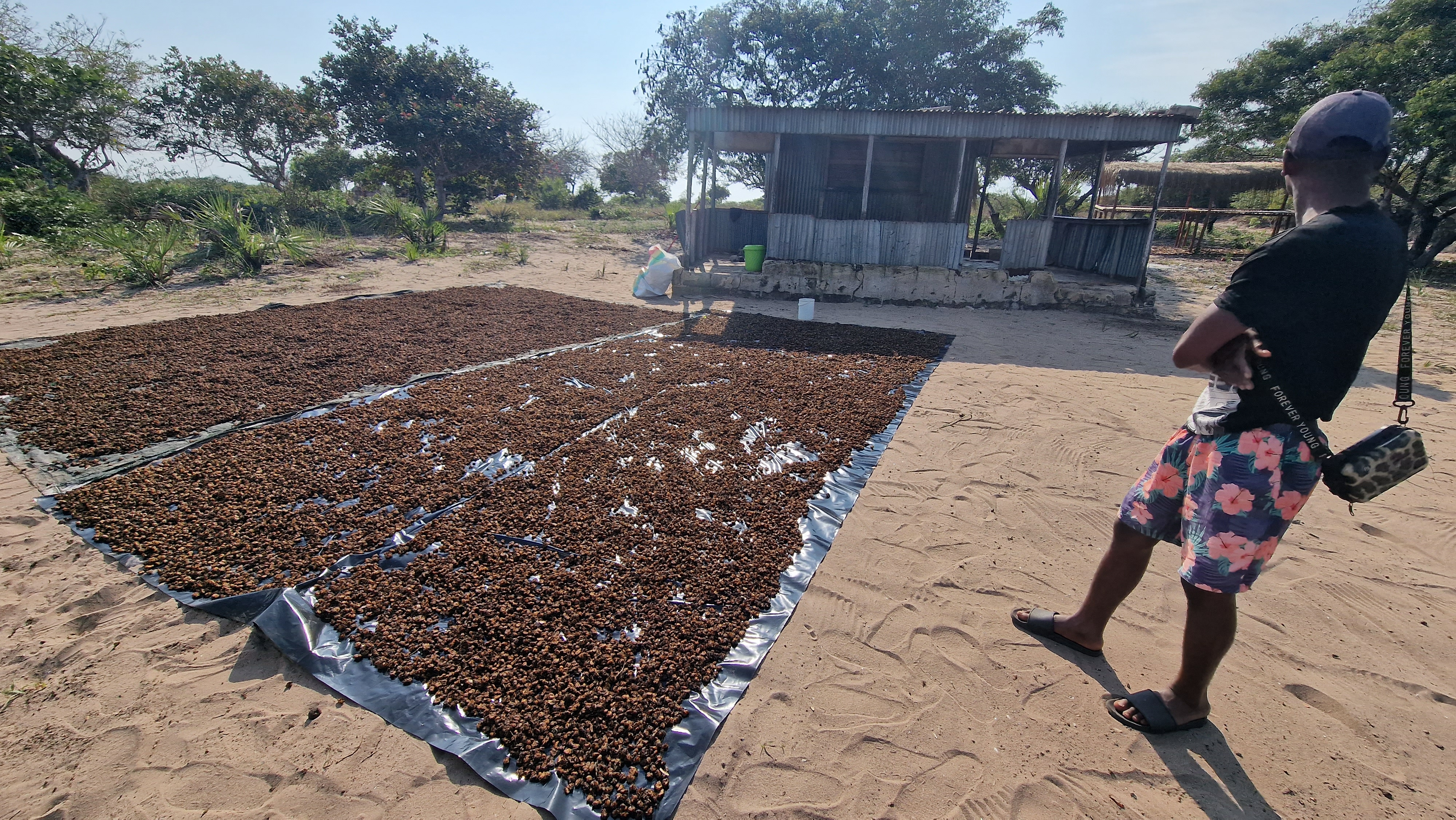
Shellfish drying in the sun in Mozambique, Africa – a traditional preservation method
Tomatoes and peppers

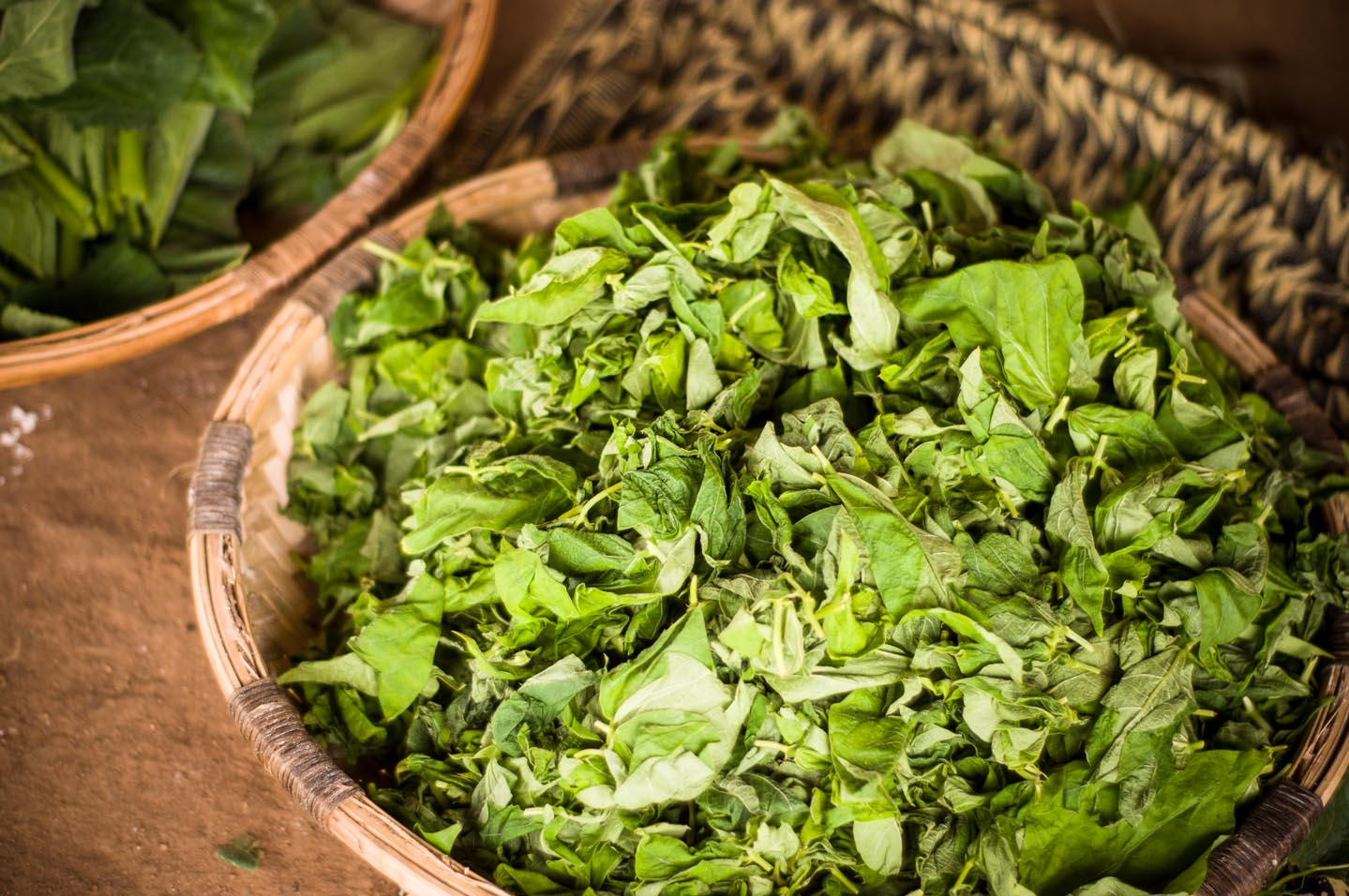
Liponda

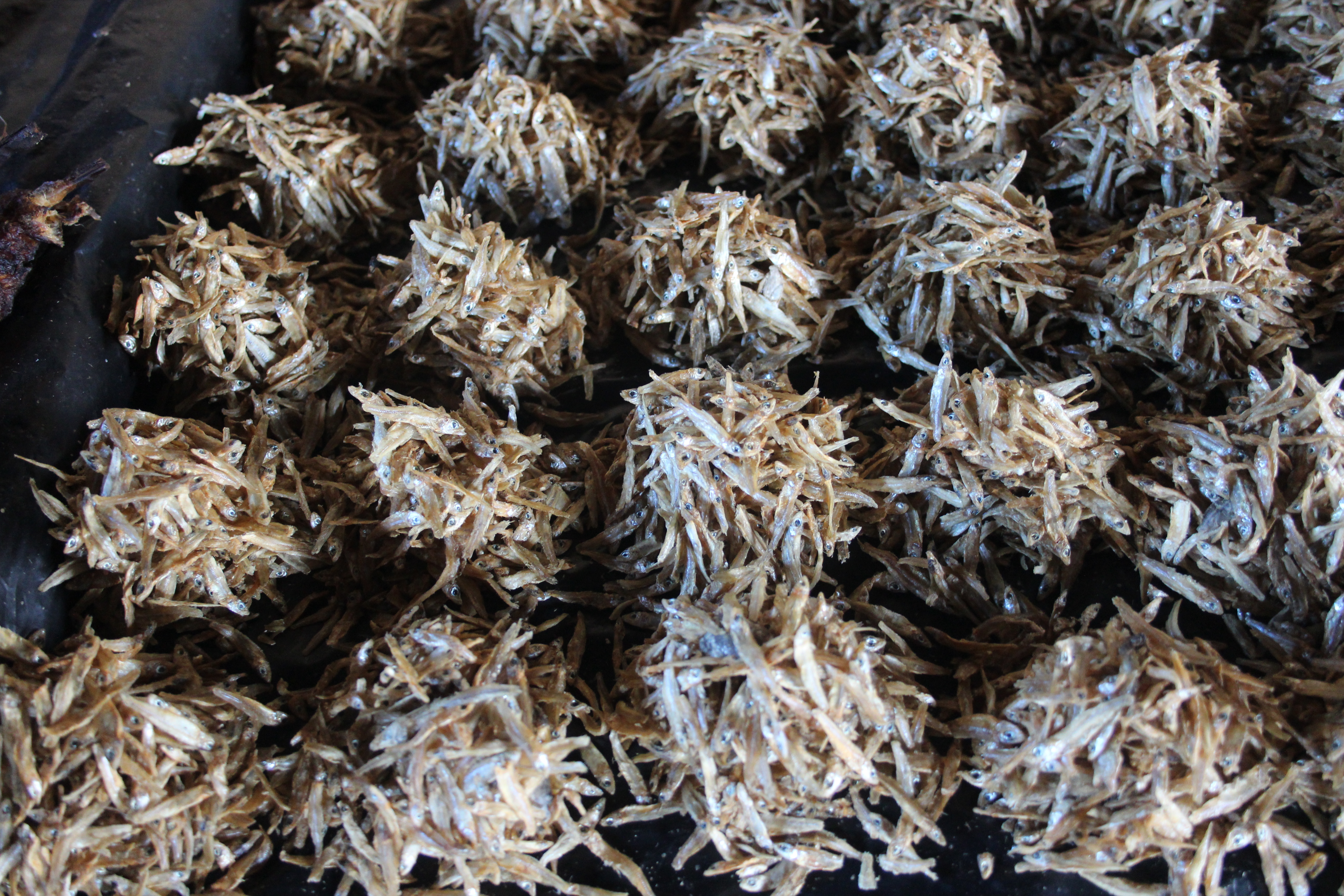
Small dried fish

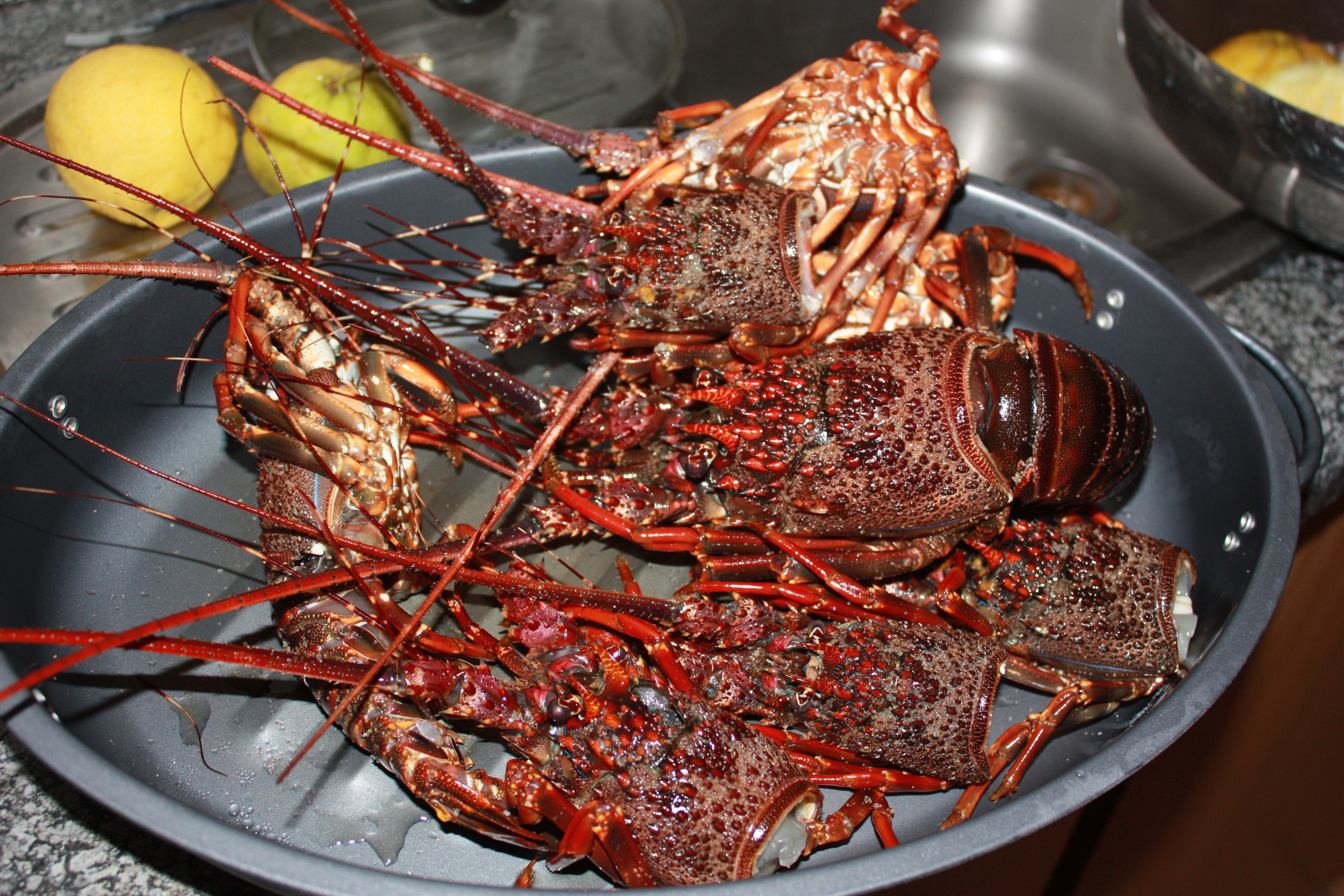
Crayfish

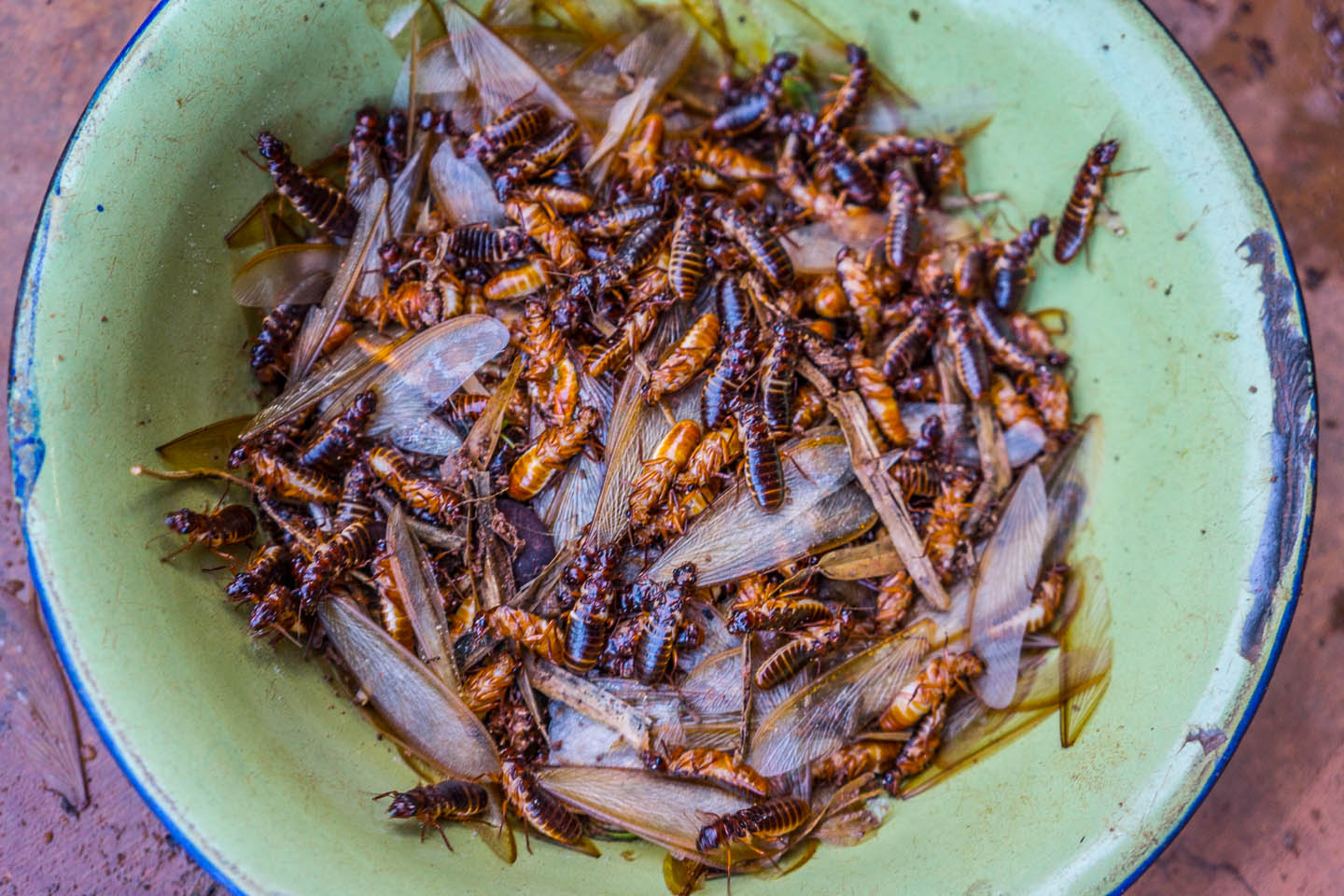
Ngumbi

== See also ==
- African cuisine
- East African cuisine
