= Capsicum minimum =

Capsicum minimum can refer to:

- Capsicum minimum Mill., a synonym of Capsicum annuum L.
- Capsicum minimum Roxb., a synonym of Capsicum frutescens L.
