= Canjica (dish) =

Brazilian sweet porridge

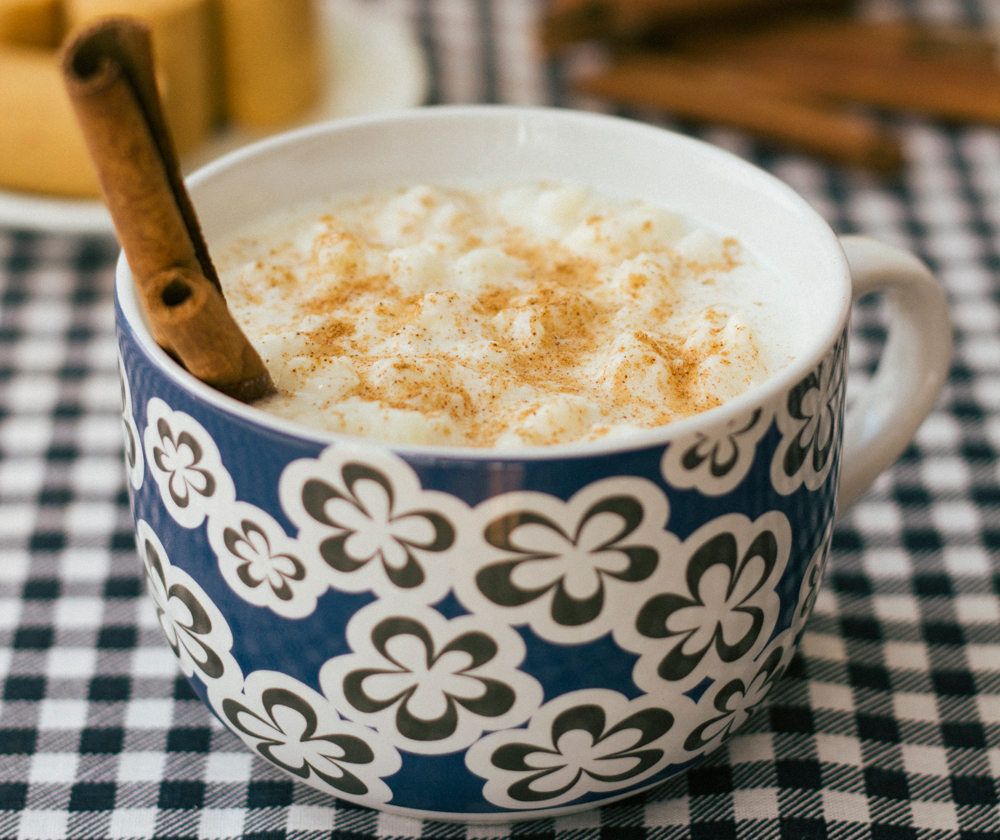
- Alternative names: Canjicão, mugunzá, chá de burro
- Type: Porridge
- Place of origin: Brazil
- Main ingredients: Canjica, milk, sugar and cinnamon

Canjica (Portuguese pronunciation: [kɐ̃ˈʒikɐ]), mugunzá ([muɡũˈza]) or mungunzá ([mũɡũˈza]) (these last two are words of African origin) is a Brazilian sweet dish, associated with winter festivals, which in Brazil is in June (Festa Junina).

The dish is a porridge made with white or yellow de-germed whole maize kernels (canjica), cooked with milk, sugar and cinnamon until tender. Coconut and coconut milk as well as some cloves and roasted peanuts are also added, mainly in the northern variety of this recipe (Northeastern variety). Other ingredients may be added, such as peanuts and sweetened condensed milk.

The name canjica is prevalent in central-southern Brazil, while mugunzá is used in the northern states (where canjica means a different dish, made with unripe cooked corn juice). Also known as canjicão in some parts of Brazil. The three words come from the Kikongo and/or Kimbundu languages, where they refer to similar grain porridges.

In Colombia and other Latin American countries, one dish similar to canjica cooked corn, known as mazamorra, is widespread in the traditional cuisine.

== See also ==
- Pamonha
- Canjica, a type of white corn
- Curau
- List of Brazilian sweets and desserts
- Cuisine of São Tomé and Príncipe
