= Malagueta pepper =

Variety of chili pepper

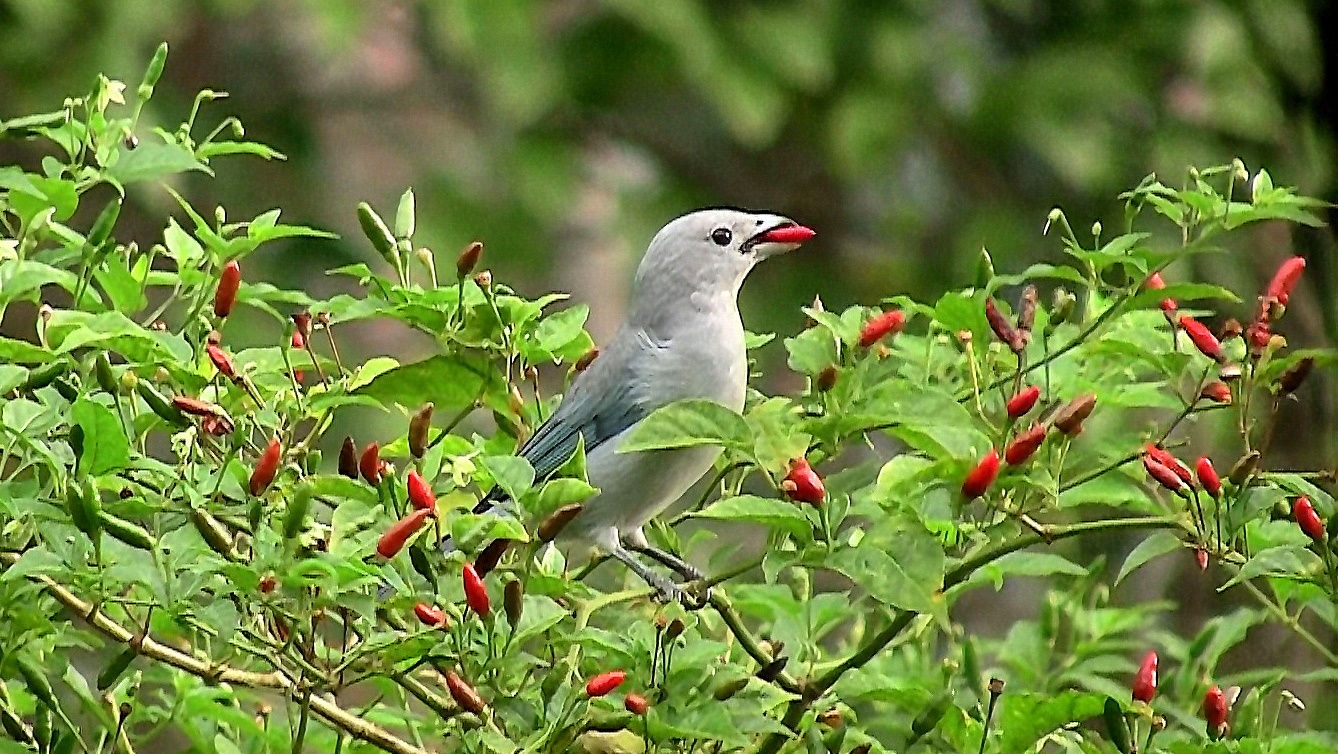
- A sayaca tanager feeding on malagueta peppers
- Genus: Capsicum
- Species: Capsicum frutescens
- Cultivar: 'Malagueta'
- Heat: Very hot
- Scoville scale: 60,000–100,000 SHU

Malagueta pepper (Portuguese pronunciation: [mɐlɐˈɡetɐ]), a variety of Capsicum frutescens, is a type of chili pepper widely used in the Portuguese-speaking world (Portugal, Brazil, Mozambique, Angola, Cape Verde, and São Tomé and Príncipe) and the Caribbean. It gets its name from the unrelated melegueta pepper, an African spice from Guinea which is a member of the ginger family.

The malagueta pepper is a small, tapered chili that grows to about 5 cm (2 in) in length. It has a range of 60,000 to 100,000 Scoville units.

== Nomenclature ==
Two sizes are seen in markets, which sometimes have different names: the smaller ones are called malaguetinha in Brazil, and as piri piri (a Swahili name) in Mozambique and in Portugal, though this name is now also used for a newer, derived African cultivar, the piri piri pepper), while the larger ones are called malagueta in both Brazil and Portugal. They are not different varieties, just peppers of different maturities from the same plant. It is also known in Angola by the names of jindungo, ndongo, nedungo, and pripíri in various local languages. In Cape Verde, malagueta is called m'lagueta and margueta in the Capeverdean language.

Some botanical and culinary writers continue to confuse malagueta chili and melegueta pepper due to their similar names.

== History ==
The first Europeans to have contact with this species were the crew members who accompanied Christopher Columbus when they first landed in the Caribbean in 1492. In addition to being a noble delicacy much appreciated by the ancient inhabitants of the Americas, it was also used as a natural dye and, above all, as a medicine.

The spicy capsaicin content of the chilis must have aroused the interest of the Portuguese, who for decades have been looking for easier sources for the then-rare black pepper of Asia (the piquant compound in which is piperine); one of the major motivations for the Columbian voyages was to discover a new route to Asia for direct trade in spices, silks, and other Asian goods. At the time of Columbus's arrival in the New World, the Portuguese traded from the Gulf of Guinea a very popular African spice as a substitute for the black pepper: Aframomum melegueta (today in disuse in the West, but known as grains of paradise), which was then best known as melegueta pepper. Although African slaves loved the grains of paradise already familiar in their culture, they were fascinated by the fiery Capsicum pepper. The name was applied to the local chilis, as malagueta, because the chili's piquancy was reminiscent of Old World pepper.

In the period of intense exchanges and trips between Europe and the Americas known today as the Columbian exchange, Portuguese navigators took this new "malagueta" to Portugal and to Brazil, where it became known as chili, chile, or pimenta; to Africa, where it became very popular as jindungo and piri-piri; and eventually to Asia, where it became an ingredient of curries and other spicy dishes. Because of its qualities, less than a century after being brought to Europe this chili pepper spread to many other Old World cultures and became integrated with local cuisines, including in Arabia, India, Thailand, China, and surrounding regions.

== Uses ==
In the cuisine of São Tomé and Príncipe, piri-piri sauce made with malagueta peppers is commonly available as condiment in restaurants throughout São Tomé and Príncipe, as well as in Portugal.

In the municipality of Borba, Amazonas, Brazil, the malagueta pepper is also used to ward off the evil eye, which is rooted in feelings of envy.

== See also ==
- Siling labuyo
- Tabasco pepper
- List of Capsicum cultivars
