= Facing heaven pepper =

Chili pepper cultivar

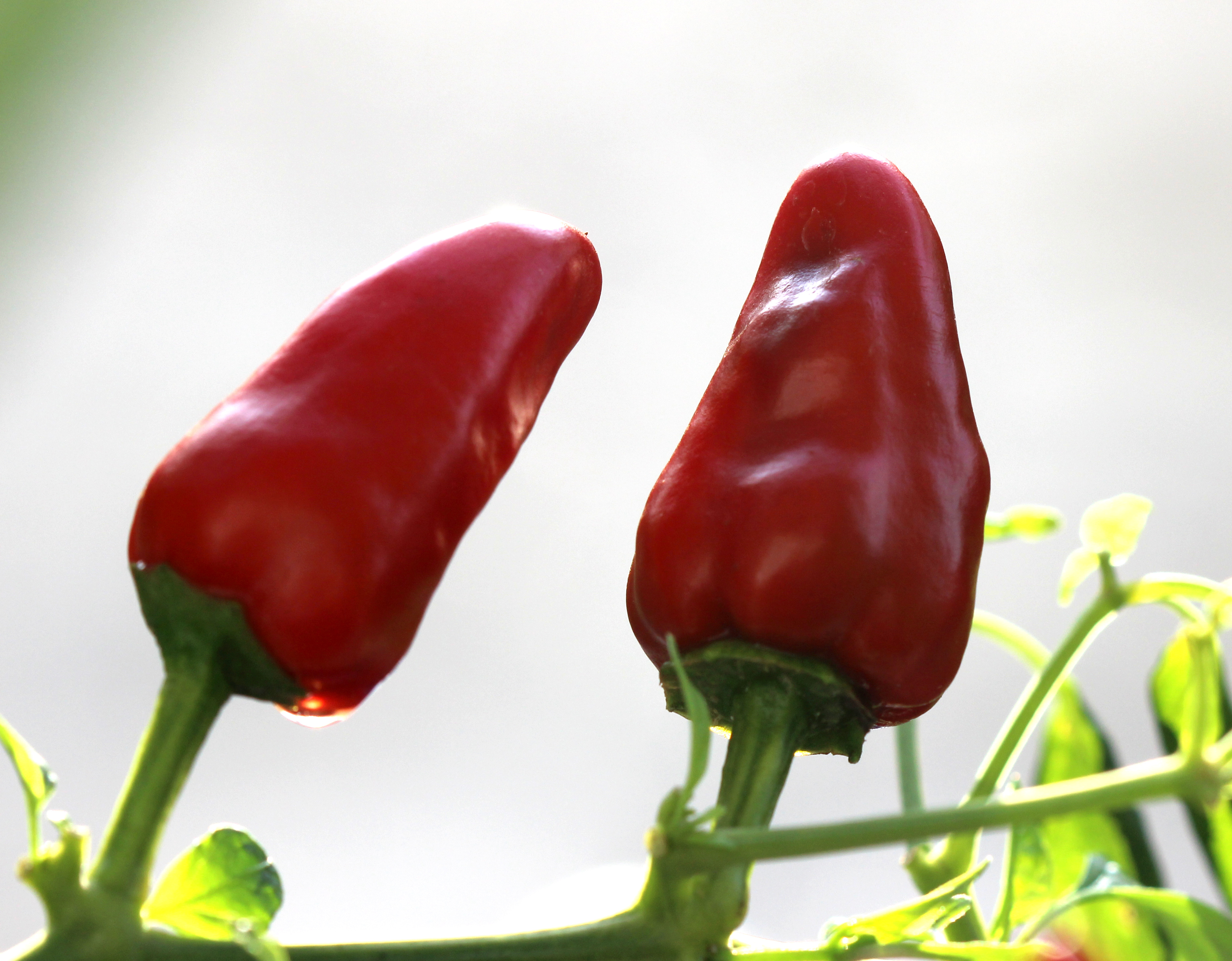
Facing heaven peppers on a vine

The facing heaven pepper (Chinese name: 朝天椒; pinyin: cháotiānjiāo, also known as 指天椒; pinyin: zhǐtiānjiāo meaning "skyward-pointing chili pepper") is a type of cone pepper, a group of cone-shaped, medium-hot chili peppers within the species Capsicum annuum. The species is native to Central America.

== Taxonomy ==
The facing heaven pepper is type of cone pepper, a group within the species Capsicum annuum. Cone peppers are sometimes listed as a botanical variety, as Capsicum annuum var. conoides. This variety is not an accepted name in the Global Biodiversity Information Facility or Kew's Plants of the World Online. Cone peppers are now called the Capsicum annuum "conoides group".

== Description ==
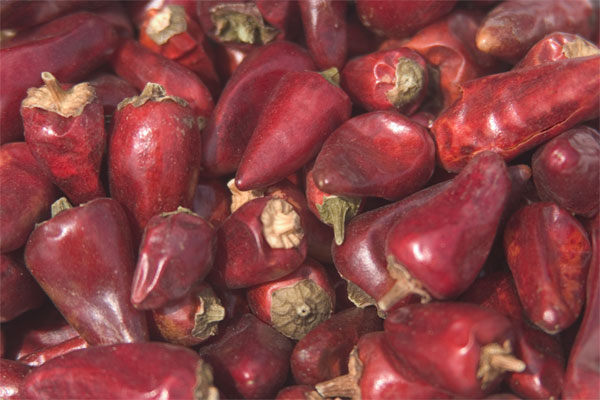
Dried facing heaven chilies

Facing heaven peppers are identified by the conical shape and dark red color of mature fruit.

== Uses ==
Historic sources described the fruits as "extremely spicy" though the flavor has likely changed over time.
