= Curau =

Brazilian dessert

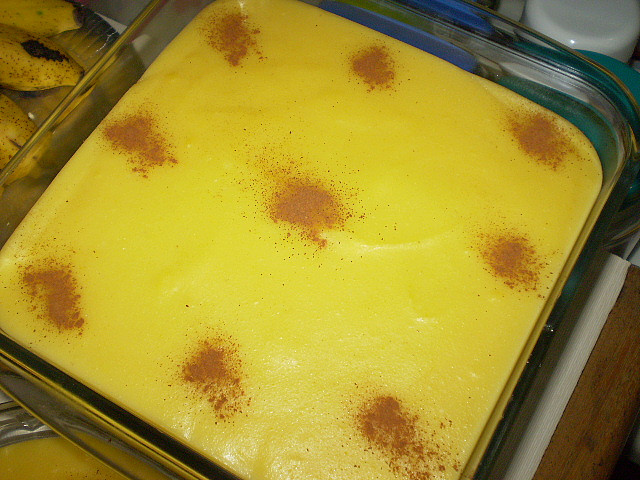
- Course: Dessert
- Place of origin: Brazil
- Main ingredients: Milk, sugar, maize or sweet corn

Curau (Portuguese pronunciation: [kuˈɾaw]) is a Brazilian sweet custard-like dessert made from the pressed juice of unripe maize, cooked with milk and sugar.

The term curau is used mostly the southern states such as São Paulo, Mato Grosso, and Mato Grosso do Sul. It is also called corá (pronounced [koˈɾa]) in Minas Gerais, papa-de-milho [ˈpapɐdʒiˈmiʎu] 'corn porridge' in Rio de Janeiro, and canjica [kɐ̃ˈʒikɐ] in the northern half of Brazil.

== Typical recipes ==
Curau recipes typically call for about half to two liters of milk and one to three cups of sugar to 10 ears of unripe maize or sweet corn. Other ingredients may be added, such as a pinch of salt, a tablespoon of butter. The milk may be replaced in part by coconut milk or condensed milk.

To prepare the curau, the corn kernels are grated off the ears and put into a cloth bag. The bag is then squeezed while adding the milk little by little, so as to extract as much juice as possible from the ground corn mass. Alternatively, the ground corn and milk may be processed with a blender and then passed through fine sieve.

The extracted liquid is combined with the sugar and any other ingredients, and thickened to a creamy consistency by cooking on the stove for about 45 minutes (or in the microwave oven for 12–15 minutes), stirring frequently. The cream is then poured into appropriate containers (dessert cups, muffin molds, shallow baking pans, etc.)

The curau may be served warm or cool (when it acquires a firm custard-like consistency). It is typically dusted with powdered cinnamon.

== Curau in popular culture ==
A giant canjica has been prepared every year since 1999 in the town of Caruaru for the Festa de São João in northeast Brazil; the 2008 issue was 35 meters long and used 4,500 ears of corn.

In the southern states, the word canjica is used for a different dessert, made with ripe unground white maize kernels, cooked in milk until soft, and which is called mungunzá doce in the northern half of Brazil.

== See also ==
- Pamonha
- Polenta
- List of Brazilian sweets and desserts
