= Matapa =

Mozambican dish made with cassava leaves

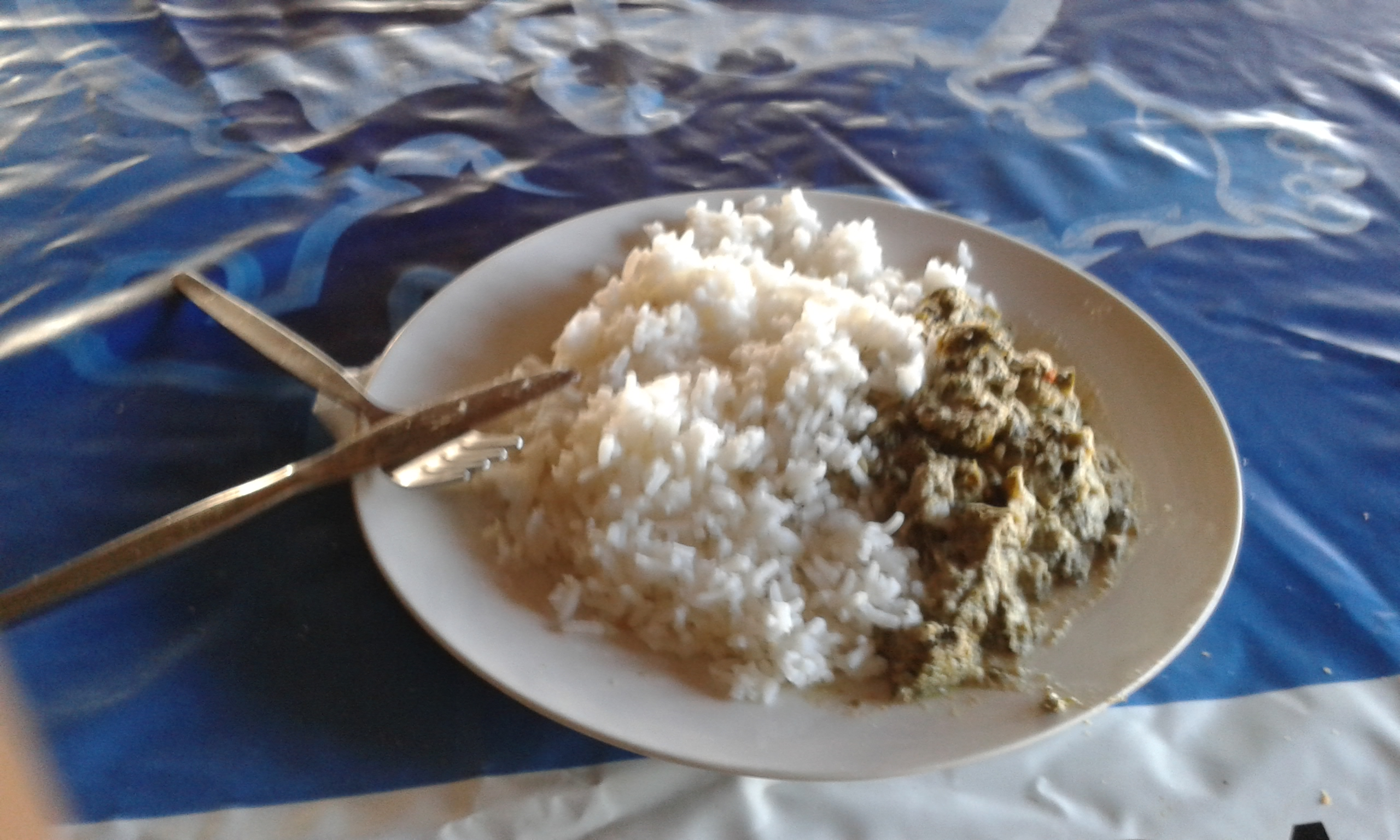
- Matapa served with white rice
- Place of origin: Mozambique
- Main ingredients: Young cassava leaves
- Similar dishes: Vatapá, ndolé

Matapa or matata is a typical Mozambican dish, prepared with young cassava, pumpkin, or spinach leaves which are usually ground in a large wooden mortar and pestle before being cooked with peanuts, tomatoes, garlic, onion and coconut milk. Many matapa dishes incorporate cashew nuts, crab, or shrimp. It is often served over rice.
