= Peanut curry =

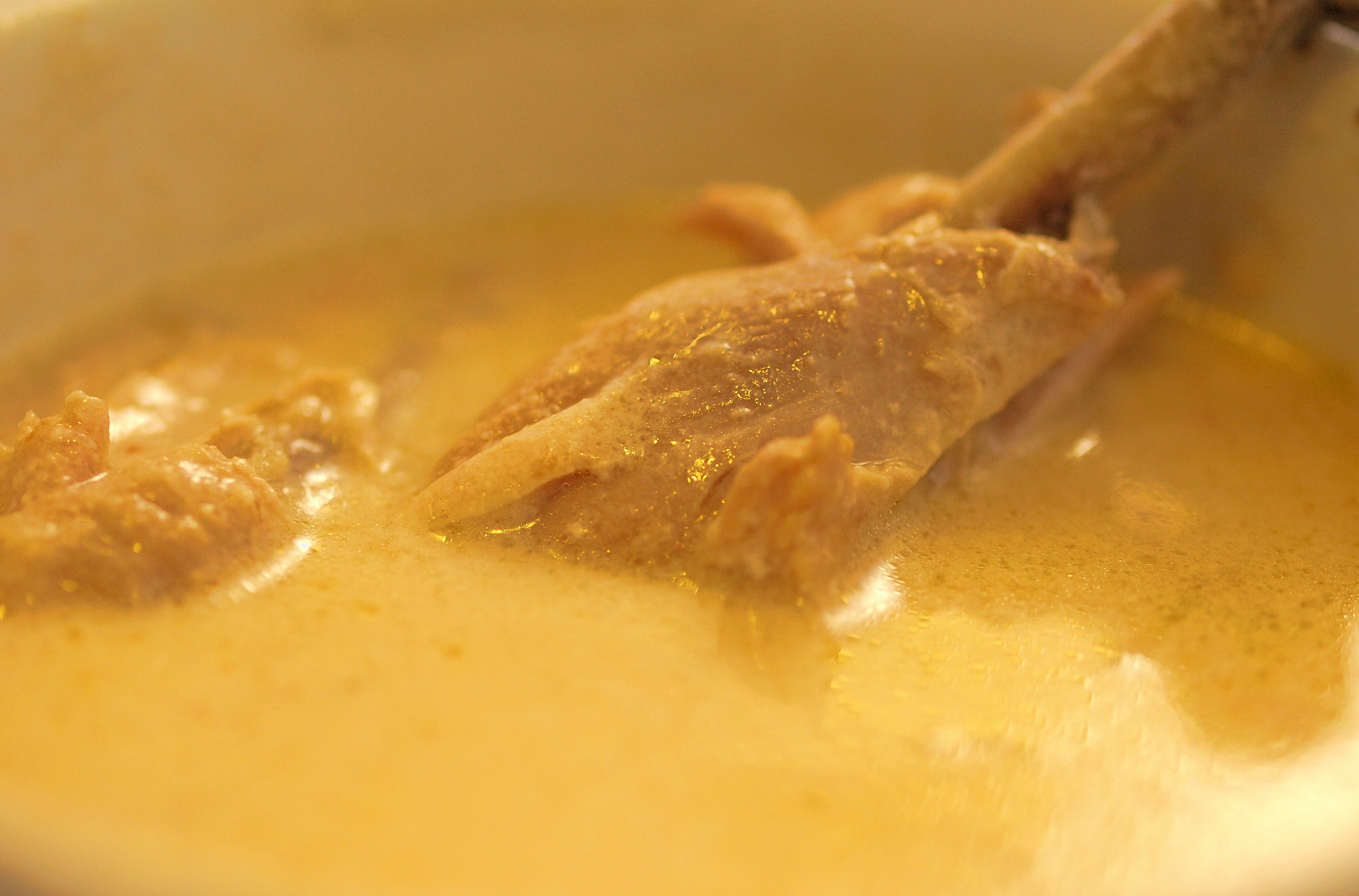
- Alternative names: Caril de amendoim
- Type: Curry
- Place of origin: Mozambique
- Region or state: Gaza, Maputo
- Associated cuisine: Mozambican cuisine
- Main ingredients: Peanuts, coconut milk, chicken or horse mackerel
- Similar dishes: Peanut stew

Caril de amendoim (translated as peanut curry) is a Mozambican dish made with coconut milk, chicken or horse mackerel, and peanuts. It is served mainly in the country's southern provinces of Maputo and Gaza. It is paired with a side of xima, a hardened maize porridge. The peanuts are finely ground in water which gives the dish a creamy color and velvety texture.
