= Canjica =

Variety of corn typical of Brazilian cuisine

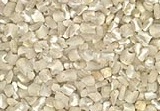
Dry canjica kernels

Canjica is a white variety of corn typical of Brazilian cuisine. It is mostly used in a special kind of sweet popcorn and in a sweet dish also named "canjica", a popular Festa Junina dish.

== See also ==
- List of Brazilian dishes
- List of Brazilian sweets and desserts
