= Cone pepper =

Type of chili peppers

Cone peppers
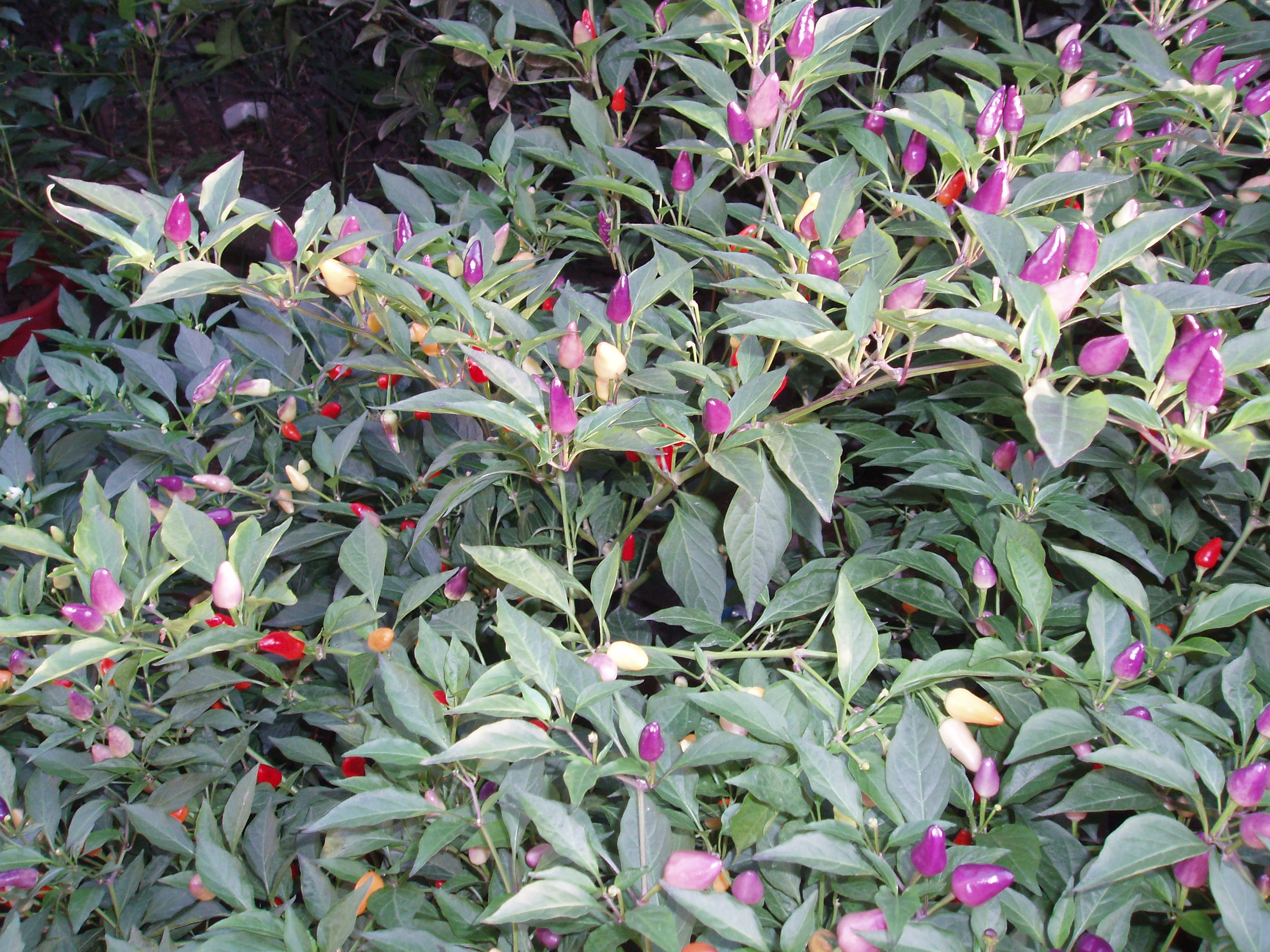
- Species: Capsicum annuum
- Cultivar group: Conoides group

Cone peppers, also known as biberi peppers, conic peppers, or conical peppers, are a group of chili peppers within the species Capsicum annuum.

== Taxonomy ==
Cone peppers are sometimes considered a specific botanical variety, Capsicum annuum var. conoides. This variety is not an accepted name in the Global Biodiversity Information Facility, the Germplasm Resources Information Network, or Kew's Plants of the World Online and is considered a synonym of Capsicum annuum var. annuum.

This group is sometimes called the Capsicum annuum "conoides group" (or conioides group [sic]).

== Cultivars ==
Cultivars include:

- 'Chao Tian Jiao'
- 'Huay Sithon': popular, fruits up to 5 cm (2 in) long
- 'Pacete': small, pungent
- 'Super Chili'
