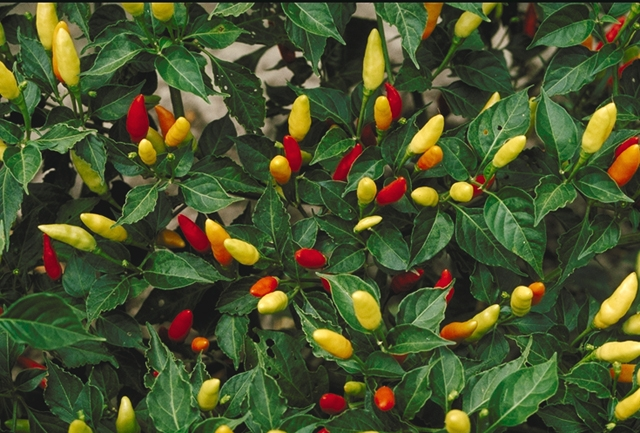
- Tabasco peppers

Conservation status
- Least Concern (IUCN 3.1)

Scientific classification
- Kingdom: Plantae
- Clade: Tracheophytes
- Clade: Angiosperms
- Clade: Eudicots
- Clade: Asterids
- Order: Solanales
- Family: Solanaceae
- Genus: Capsicum
- Species: C. frutescens

Binomial name
- Capsicum frutescens L.

= Capsicum frutescens =

Species of chili pepper

Capsicum frutescens is a wild chili pepper that has genetic proximity to the cultivated pepper Capsicum chinense. It is native to Central and South America as well as Mexico. Pepper cultivars of C. frutescens can be annual or short-lived perennial plants.

== Description ==
The flowers of Capsicum frutescens are white, with a greenish white or greenish yellow corolla. They are either insect or self-pollinated.

The berries typically grow erect and are ellipsoid-conical to lanceoloid shaped. They are usually very small and pungent, growing 10–20 mm (0.4–0.8 in) long and 3–7 mm (0.1–0.3 in) in diameter. Fruit typically grows a pale yellow and matures to a bright red, but can also be other colors.

Capsicum frutescens has a smaller variety of shapes compared to other Capsicum species. The species has been bred to produce ornamental strains because of its large quantities of erect peppers growing in colorful ripening patterns.

== Cultivars ==
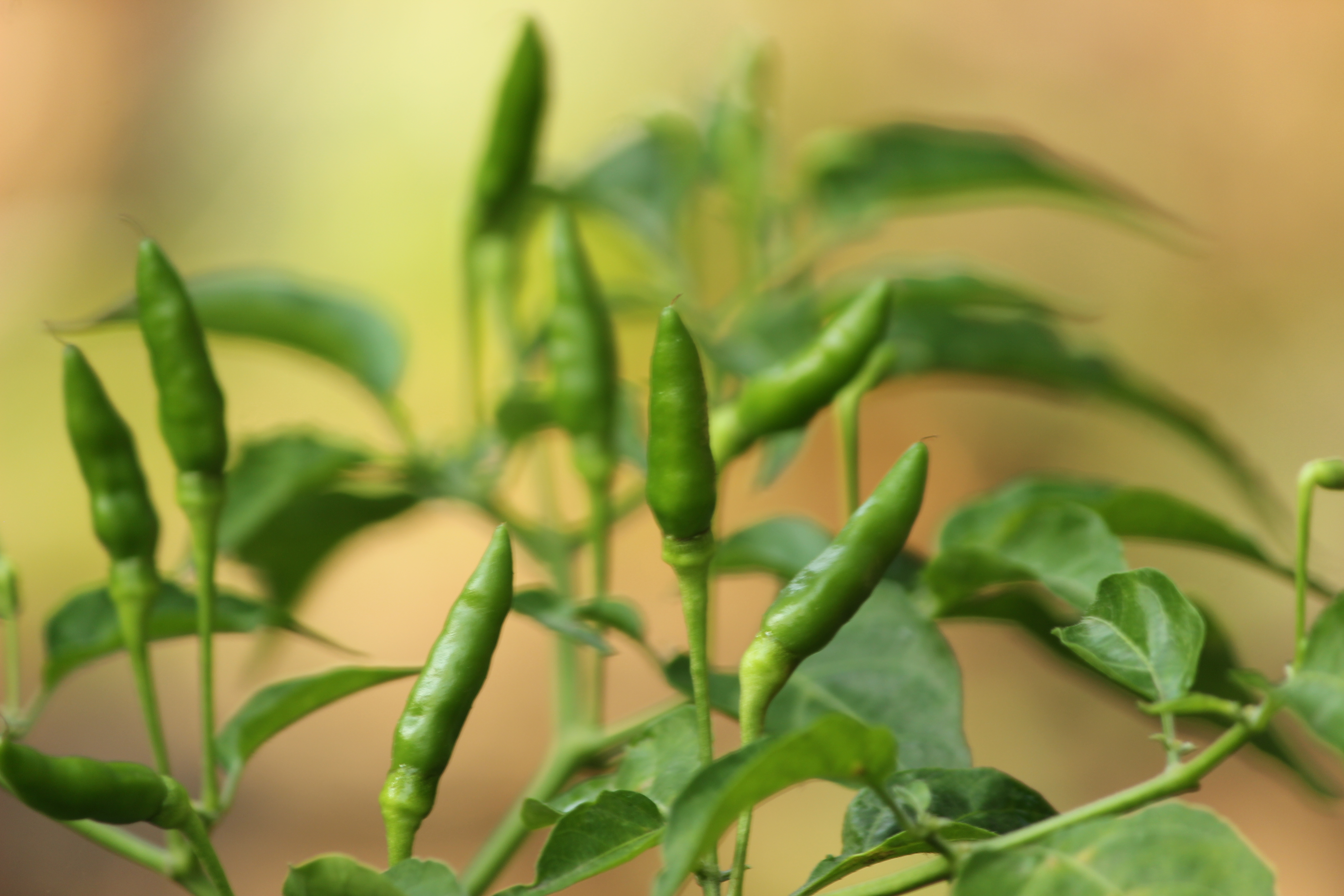
Green Capsicum frutescens

Capsicum frutescens includes the following cultivars and/or varieties:

- Wiri wiri, from Guyana
- Cabai rawit, from Indonesia, used in hot Sambal
- Malagueta pepper
- Piri piri, also called African Bird's Eye or African devil
- Siling labuyo, from the Philippines
- Tabasco pepper, used to make Tabasco sauce
- Xiao mi la pepper, literally "little rice pepper", from Yunnan province in China

== Origins and distribution ==
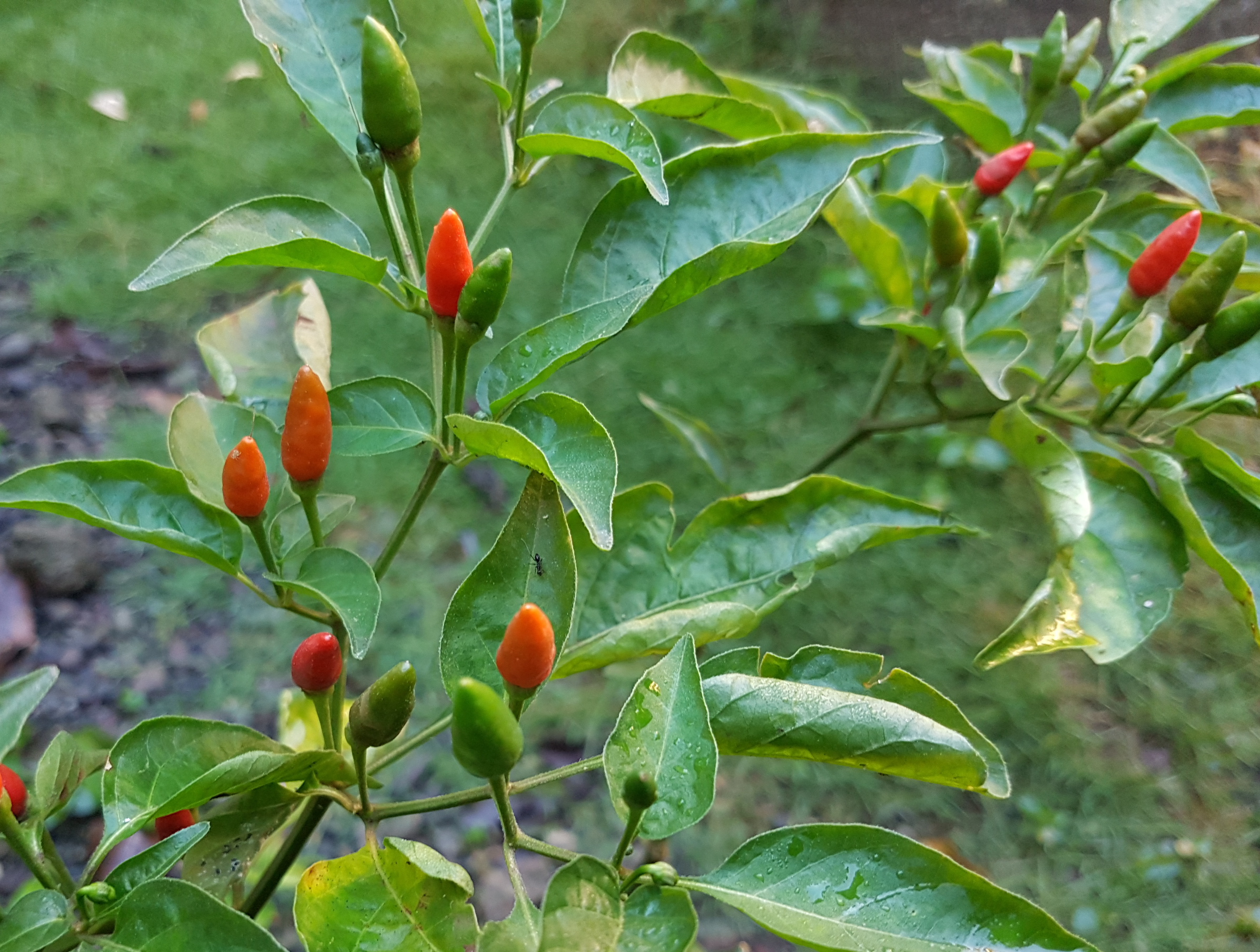
Capsicum frutescens 'Siling Labuyo' from the Philippines, showing the distinctive erect habit of C. frutescens fruits

The Capsicum frutescens species originated in South or Central America. It spread quickly throughout the tropical and subtropical regions in this area and still grows wild today. Capsicum frutescens is native to Central America and northern and western South America.

C. frutescens may be related to C. chinense. According to an 2020 study using ribosomal DNA internal transcribed spacer, C. chinense is fully nested within C. frutescens with low bootstrap support.

== Uses ==
=== Ethiopia ===
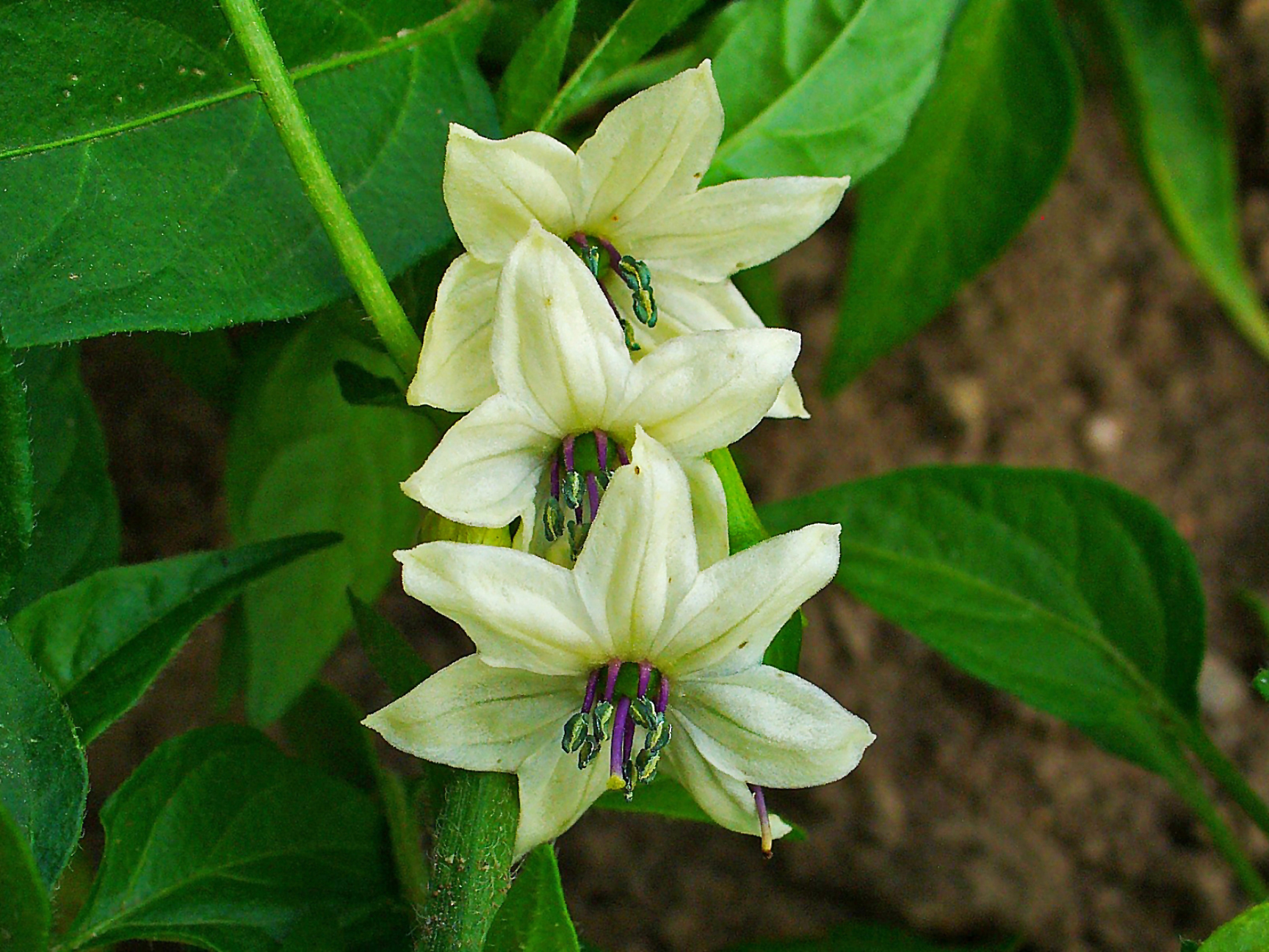
Capsicum frutescens 'Hidalgo' flowers

According to Richard Pankhurst, C. frutescens (known as barbaré) was so important to the national cuisine of Ethiopia, at least as early as the 19th century, "that it was cultivated extensively in the warmer areas wherever the soil was suitable." Although it was grown in every province, barbaré was especially extensive in Yejju, "which supplied much of Showa as well as other neighbouring provinces". He singles out the upper Golima River valley as almost entirely devoted to cultivating this plant, where thousands of acres were devoted to the plant and it was harvested year-round.

=== India ===
This pepper is common in eastern and southern India where it grows readily in a favorable climate. It is known locally by various common names. It is called kantharimulaku in Malayalam.

=== Philippines ===
Siling labuyo, the local cultivar of C. frutescens in the Philippines, developed from plants introduced during the Spanish colonial era. The fruits are widely used for making traditional dips (sawsawan), spiced vinegar (like sinamak), and condiments like palapa. They are also commonly added to various dishes. The leaves are also eaten as a leafy vegetable, most notably in the soup dish tinola.

Capsaicin, the main chemical substance responsible for the heat sensation

== See also ==
- List of Capsicum cultivars
- Capsicum
