= Piri piri =

Cultivar of Capsicum frutescens

Peri-peri
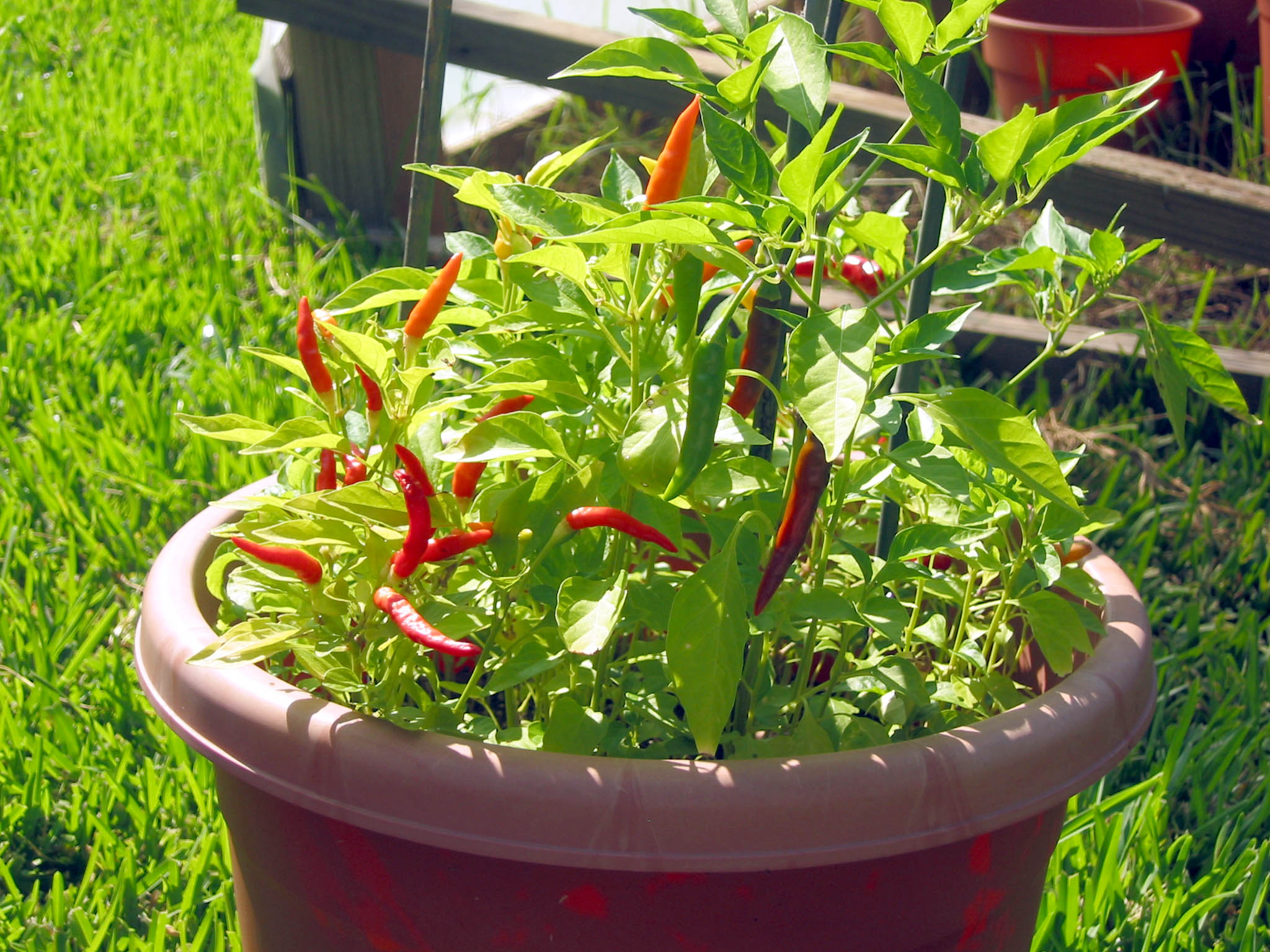
- Peri-peri peppers (ripe red and unripe green)
- Genus: Capsicum
- Species: Capsicum frutescens
- Cultivar: Pili pili
- Origin: Americas
- Heat: Very hot
- Scoville scale: 50,000–175,000 SHU

Piri piri (/ˌpɪri ˈpɪri/ PIRR-ee-PIRR-ee), often hyphenated or as one word, and with variant spellings peri-peri (/ˌpɛriˈpɛriː/) or pili pili, is a cultivar of Capsicum frutescens commonly known as the African Birds Eye chilli, from the malagueta pepper. It was originally produced by Portuguese explorers in Portugal's former Southern African territories and then spread to other Portuguese colonies.

== Etymology ==
Pilipili in Swahili means "pepper". Other romanizations include pili pili in the Democratic Republic of the Congo and peri peri in Malawi, deriving from various pronunciations of the word in different parts of Bantu-speaking Africa. The peri peri spelling is common in English due to its use in South Africa, however, in Portugal and Portuguese-speaking countries such as Mozambique, where the modern usage of the pepper originates, the spelling piri-piri is used.

The Oxford Dictionary of English records piri-piri as a foreign word meaning "a very hot sauce made with red chilli peppers", and gives its ultimate origin as the word for "pepper" (presumably in the native-African sense) in the Ronga language of southern Mozambique, where Portuguese explorers developed the homonymous cultivar from malagueta pepper.

== Plant characteristics ==
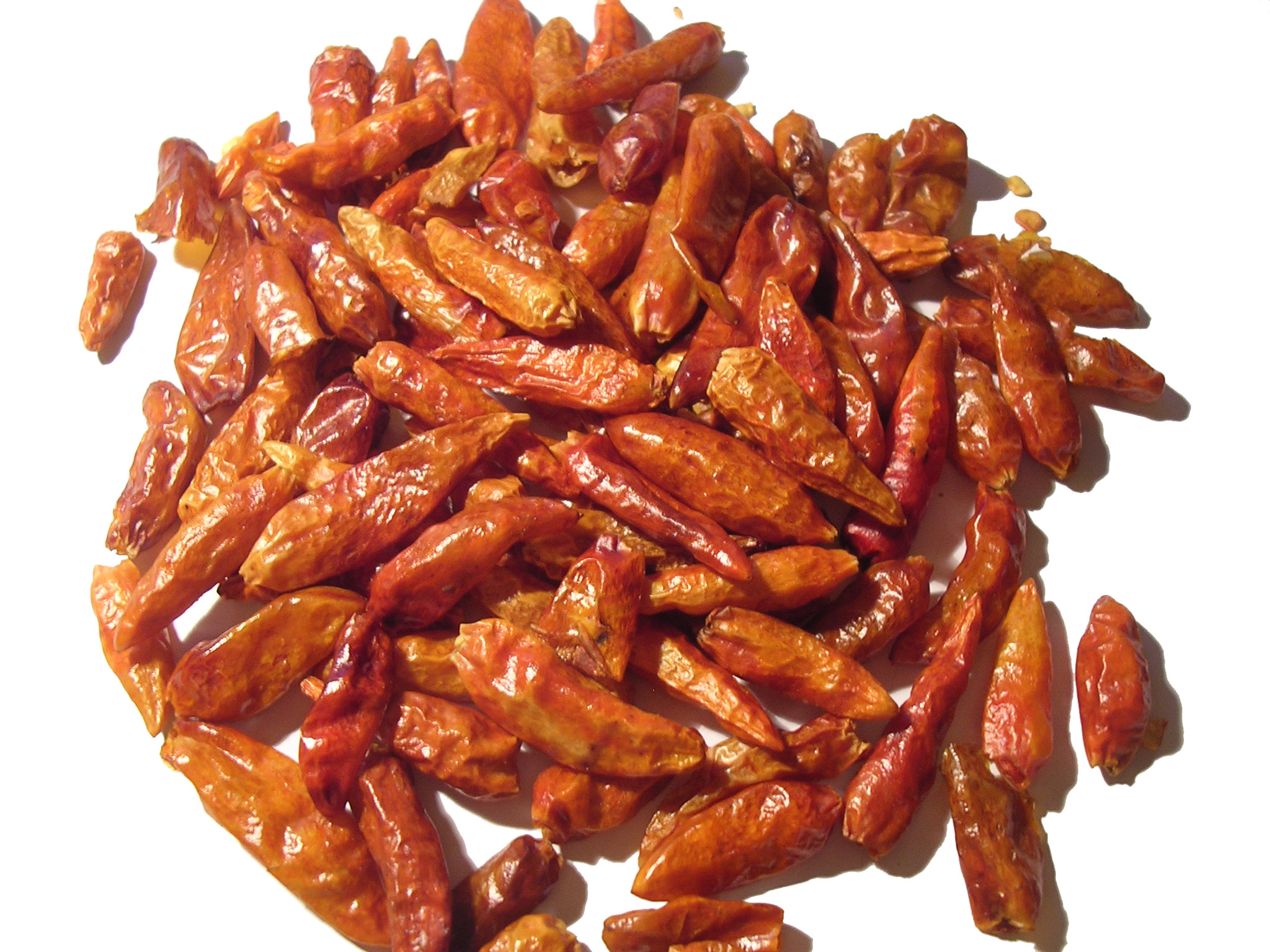
Dried piri piri chilis

Plants are usually very bushy and grow in height to 45–120 cm (18–47 in) with leaves 4–7 cm (1 1/2–3 in) long and 1.3–1.5 cm (1/2–9/16 in) wide. The fruits are generally tapered to a blunt point and measure up to 2–3 cm (3/4–1 1/4 in) long. The immature pod colour is green; the mature colour is bright red or purple. Some bird's-eye chili varieties measure up to 175,000 Scoville heat units.

== Cultivation ==
Like all chili peppers, piri-piri is descended from plants from the Americas, but it has grown in the wild in Africa for centuries and is now cultivated commercially in Zambia, Uganda, Malawi, Zimbabwe and Rwanda. It grows mainly in Malawi, Ethiopia, Zambia, South Africa, Ghana, Nigeria, Zimbabwe, Mozambique and Portugal. It is cultivated for both commercial food processing and the pharmaceutical industry. Cultivation of piri-piri is labor-intensive.

== Piri-piri sauce ==
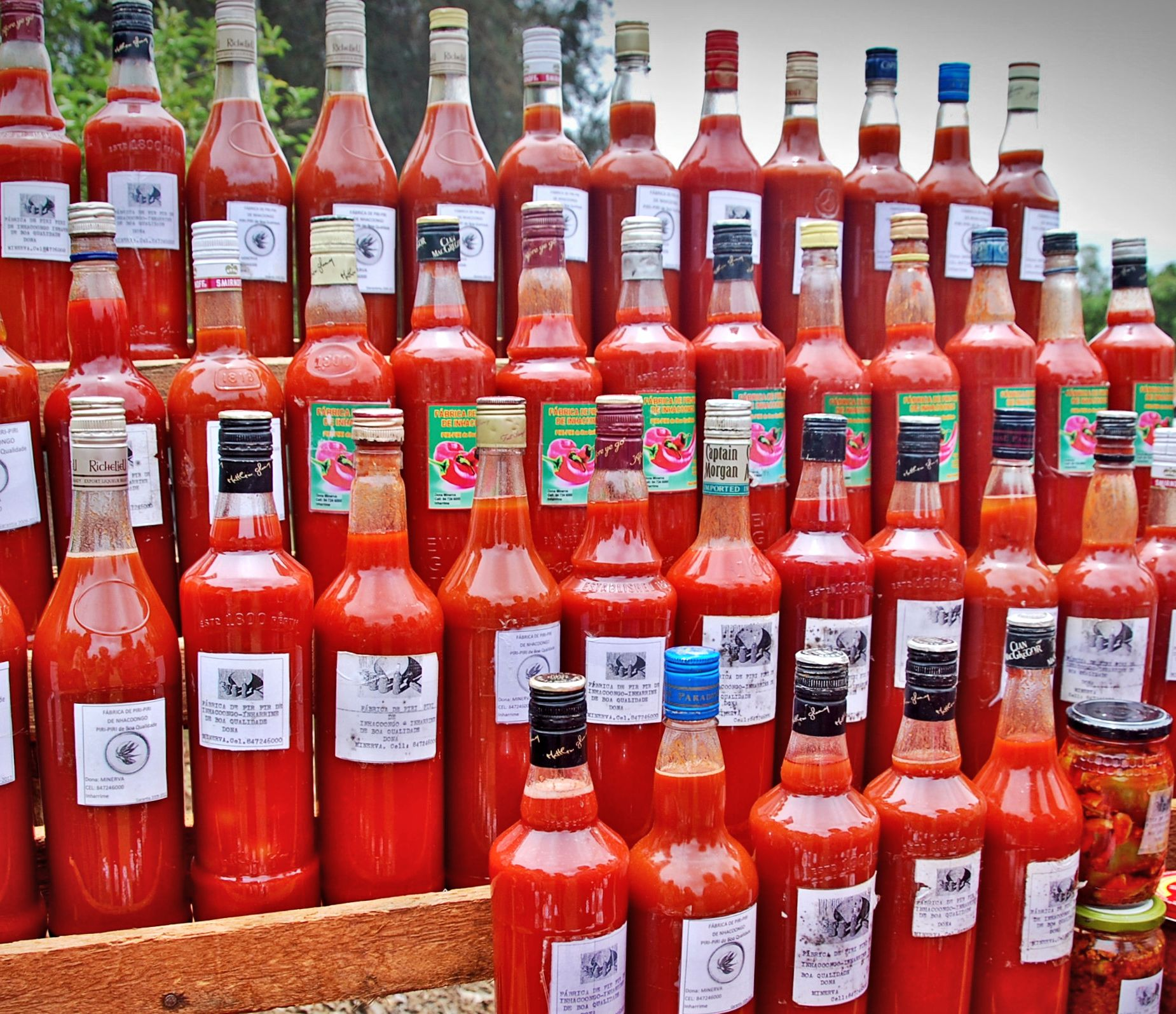
Piri-piri sauce

Piri-piri sauce was produced by mixing pepper with condiments the Portuguese traded with their other territories in Asia and India. The first sauce may have been produced in any part of Portugal's empire. Given the lack of reliable sources that it was specifically mixed in Mozambique, it seems impossible to say more than the sauce was originally produced within the Portuguese Empire, either in their territories in Southern Africa or elsewhere.

The sauce is made from piri-piri chilies (used as a seasoning or marinade). Beyond Portugal and the Southern African region (Angola, Namibia, Mozambique and South Africa) where it is very popular, the sauce is particularly well known in the United Kingdom due to the success of the South African restaurant chain Nando's.

Recipes vary from region to region, and sometimes within the same region depending on intended use (for example, cooking vs. seasoning at the table) but the key ingredients are chili and garlic, with an oily or acidic base.

Other common ingredients are salt, lemon, spirits (namely whisky), citrus peel, onion, pepper, bay leaves, paprika, pimiento, basil, oregano and tarragon.

== See also ==
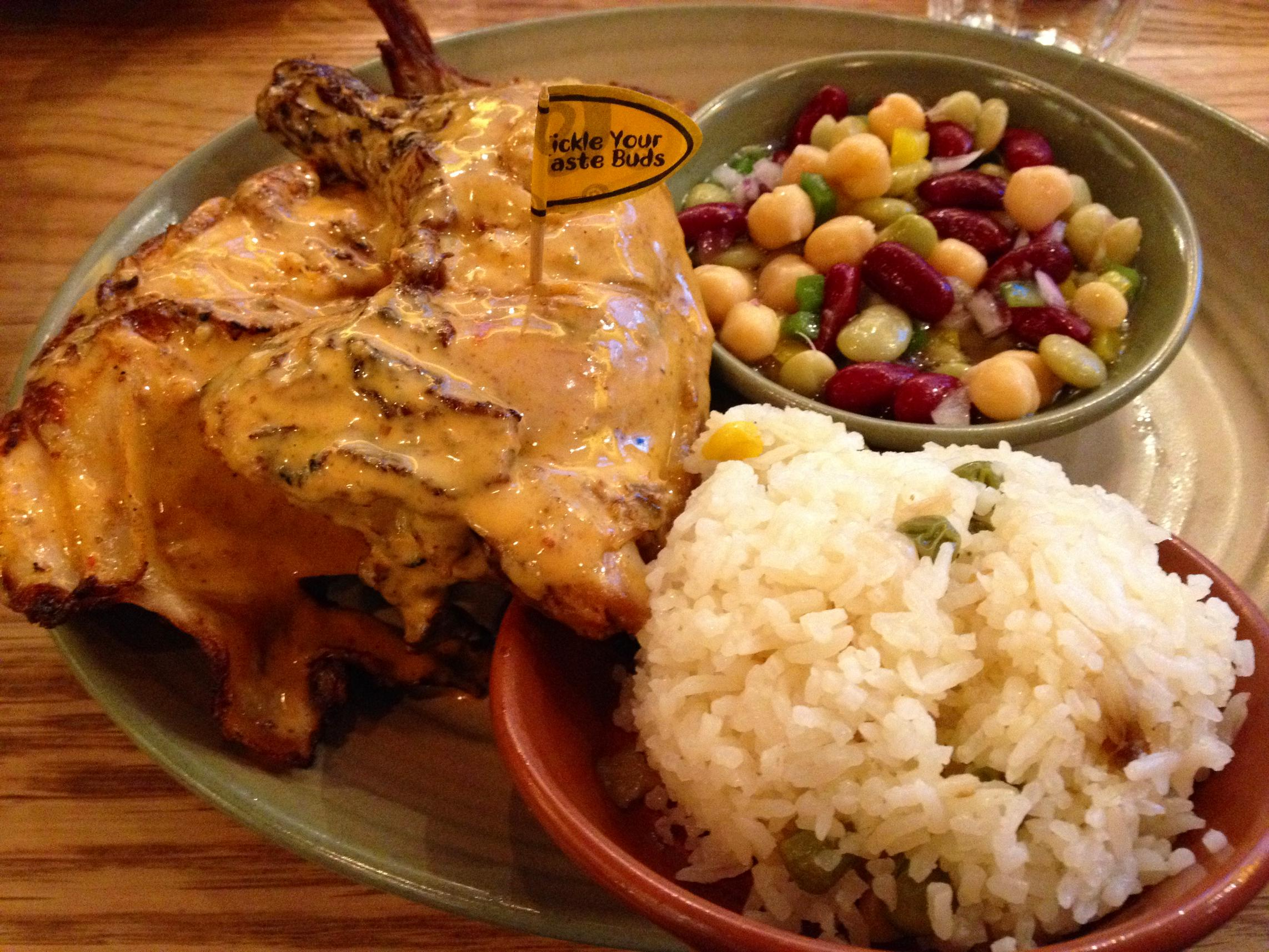
Flame-grilled peri-peri chicken from Nando's

- Berbere
- List of Capsicum cultivars
