= List of Brazilian sweets and desserts =

Below is a list of sweets and desserts found in Brazilian cuisine. Brazilian cuisine, influenced by European, African and Amerindian traditions, varies significantly by region, reflecting the country's diverse native and immigrant populations and its continental size. This has created a national cuisine that preserves regional differences.

== Desserts and sweets ==
=== A–E ===
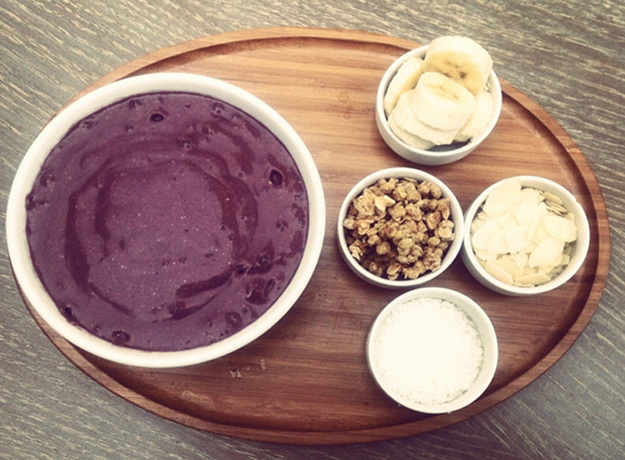
An açaí na tigela, with toppings

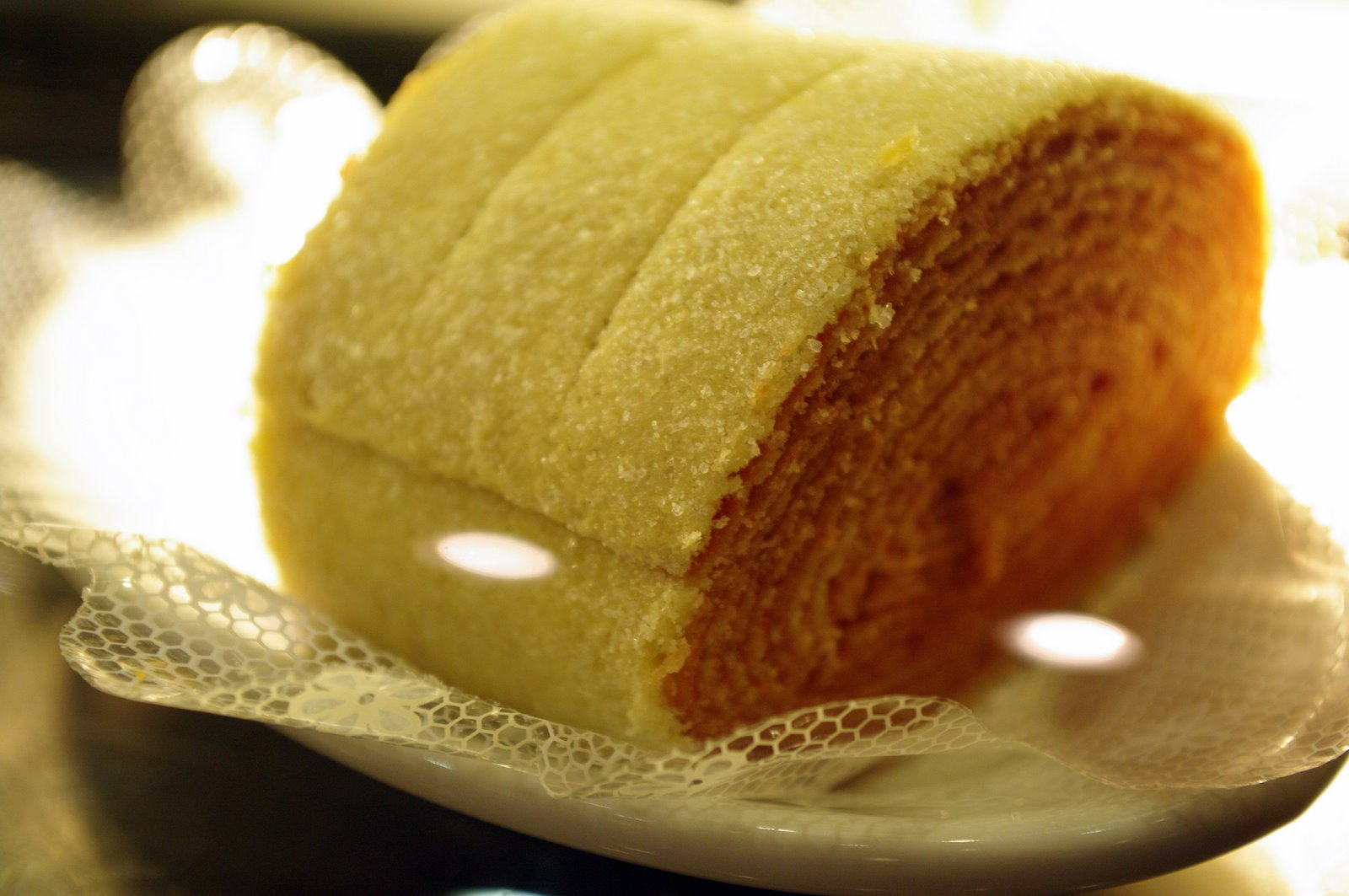
Bolo de rolo

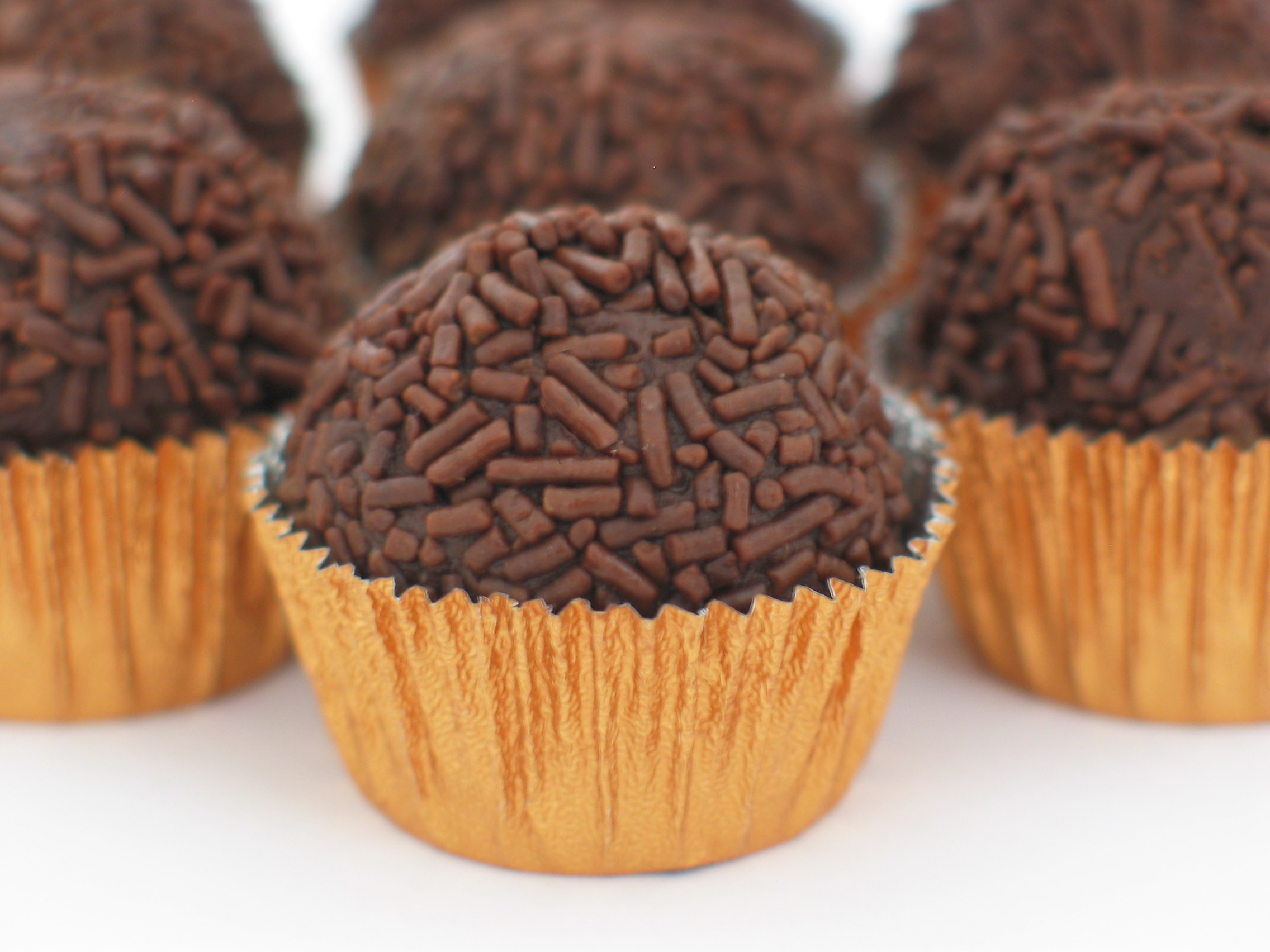
Brigadeiro

- Açaí na tigela – a Brazilian dish made of frozen and mashed açaí palm fruit, it is served as a smoothie in a bowl or glass.
- Amanteigado – a buttery cookie or biscuit
- Baba de moça
- Bananada
- Bem-casado
- Beijinho – a common Brazilian birthday party candy
- Beijo de mulata
- Bijajica – a cookie
- Biriba or biribinha
- Biroró
- Bolo de rolo – a cake prepared using guava, it is recognized as a national dish by Brazilian law.
- Bolo Souza Leão – a typical Pernambuco cake
- Bom-bocado – a coconut torte that is commonly served during Brazil's Independence Day
- Brigadeiro – a traditional Brazilian confectionery
- Broinha de coco – a coconut-based biscuit-like dessert
- Bruaca
- Cacuanga
- Cajuzinho – a popular sweet made of peanuts, cashew nuts and sugar and is shaped like a tiny cashew
- Camafeu de nozes
- Canjica – a popular Festa Junina sweet dish prepared using canjica corn
- Carolina – An éclair-like dessert
- Cartola – a typical Pernambuco dessert
- Cavaca
- Chuvisco
- Cocada – a traditional coconut candy or confectionery found in many parts of Latin America
  - Cocada branca
  - Cocada morena
  - Cocada preta
- Creme de papaya – a frozen dessert
- Cupulate – a chocolate-like dessert made using cupuaçu instead of cacao
- Curau – a sweet custard-like dessert made from the pressed juice of unripe maize, cooked with milk and sugar
- Cuscuz de tapioca – tapioca couscous, also known as cuscuz branco (white couscous), is a dessert made with tapioca granulada (coarse tapioca starch) and shredded coconut, served with sweetened condensed milk
- Doces Cristalizados
- Doce de abóbora
- Doce de espécie – typical dessert of the Northeast Region of Brazil
- Espuma de sapo

=== F–J ===
- Fatia de braga
- Fios de ovos – a traditional Portuguese sweet food made of eggs (chiefly yolks), drawn into thin strands and boiled in sugar syrup. They are a traditional element in Portuguese and Brazilian cuisine, both in desserts and as side dishes
- Furrundu

=== K–O ===
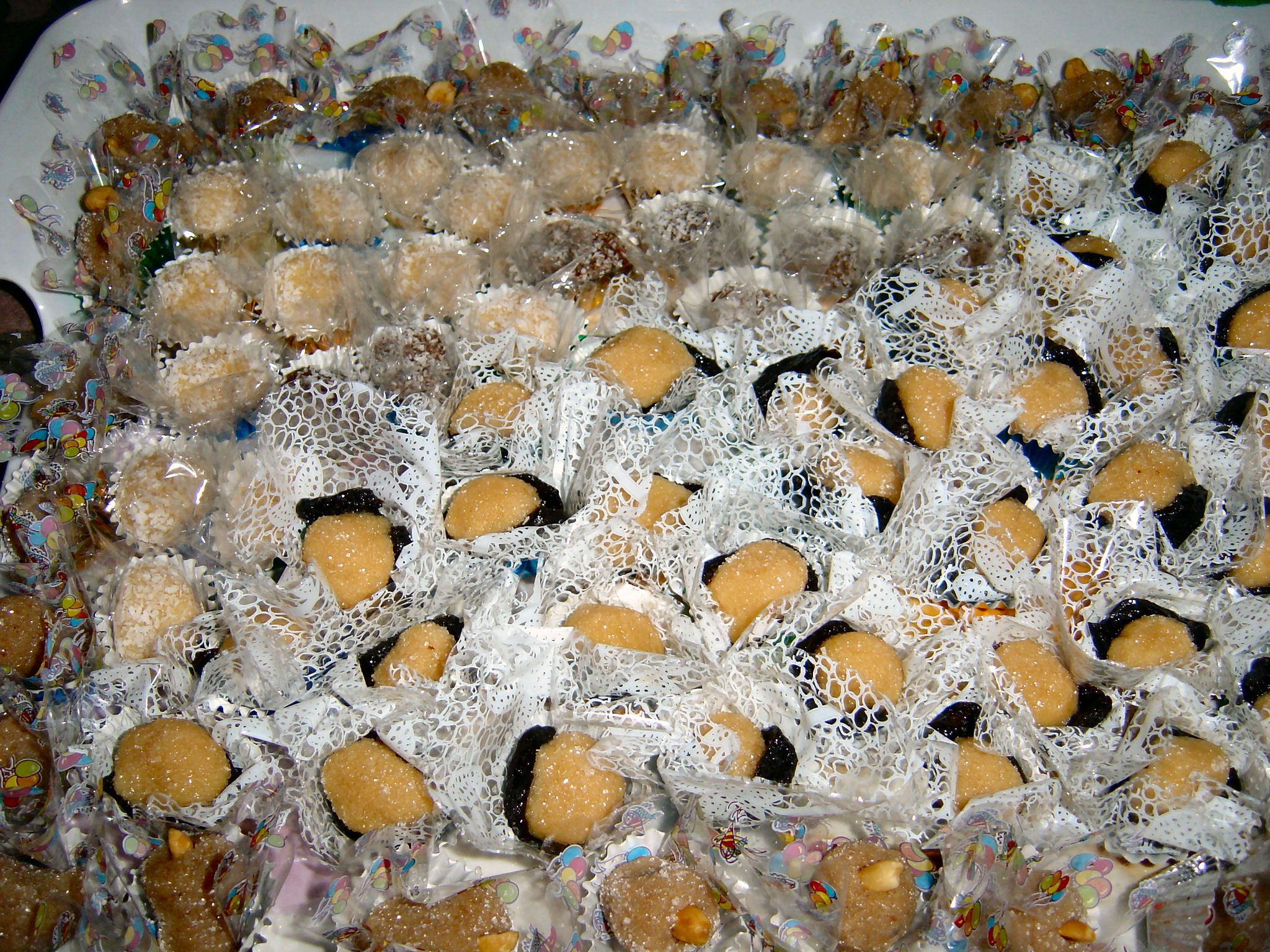
Olho de sogra

- Mané-pança
- Mané pelado
- Manjar branco – a pure white Brazilian coconut pudding
- Marmelada de Santa Luzia
- Maria-mole – similar to a marshmallow, its base ingredients are sugar, gelatin and egg whites, and it is usually covered in grated coconut
- Nhá Benta – a chocolate-coated creamy marshmallow also known as teta de nega (Black woman's teat)
- Mugunzá – a porridge made with white de-germed whole maize kernels (canjica), cooked with milk, sugar and cinnamon until tender. Other ingredients are also sometimes used.
- Olho de sogra (Mother-in-law's eye) – a candy

=== P–T ===
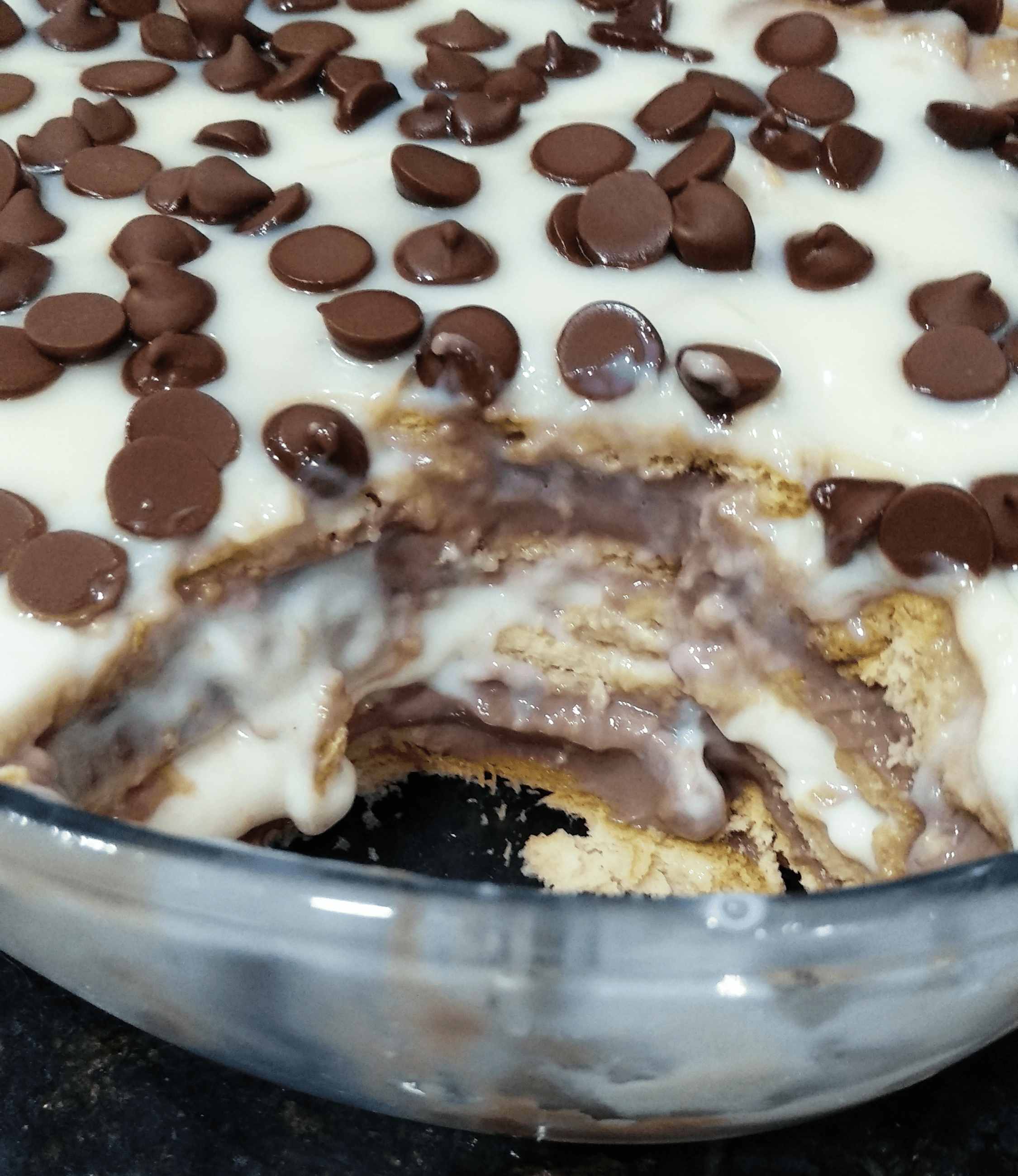
Close-up of a chocolate pavê

- Paçoca – a candy made out of ground peanuts, sugar and salt
- Palha italiana – A Brazilian variant of the chocolate salami, consists of crushed biscuits (usually similar to Marie biscuits) mixed in brigadeiro
- Pão de mel - A little cake made of honey, filled with condensed milk cream and covered with a thin layer of chocolate
- Papo-de-anjo – a traditional Portuguese dessert made chiefly from whipped egg yolks, baked and then boiled in sugar syrup.
- Pastel doce
- Pastel de Santa Clara
- Passion fruit mousse
- Pavê – a dessert similar to Tiramisu made using ladyfingers (known as "champagne biscuits" in Brazil) or a Marie biscuit equivalent, chocolate cream and condensed milk
- Pé de moleque – a candy made using peanuts, jaggery or molasses
- Pudim de leite moça [pt]
- Queijadinha – a candy that originated in Portugal, and is common in Brazil
- Quindim – a popular Brazilian baked custard dessert
- Rapadura – unrefined whole cane sugar
- Romeu e Julieta – Goiabada eaten with cheese
- Sweet rice – rice pudding
- Sagu – a southern Brazilian dessert, made with tapioca pearls, sugar and red wine, it is typical of the state of Rio Grande do Sul.
- Torta alemã (lit. 'german pie')

=== U–Z ===
- Umbuzada – A drink made from cooked umbu fruit, milk and sugar

== Gallery ==
Brazilian sweets and desserts

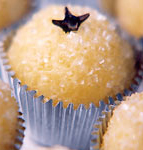
Beijinho

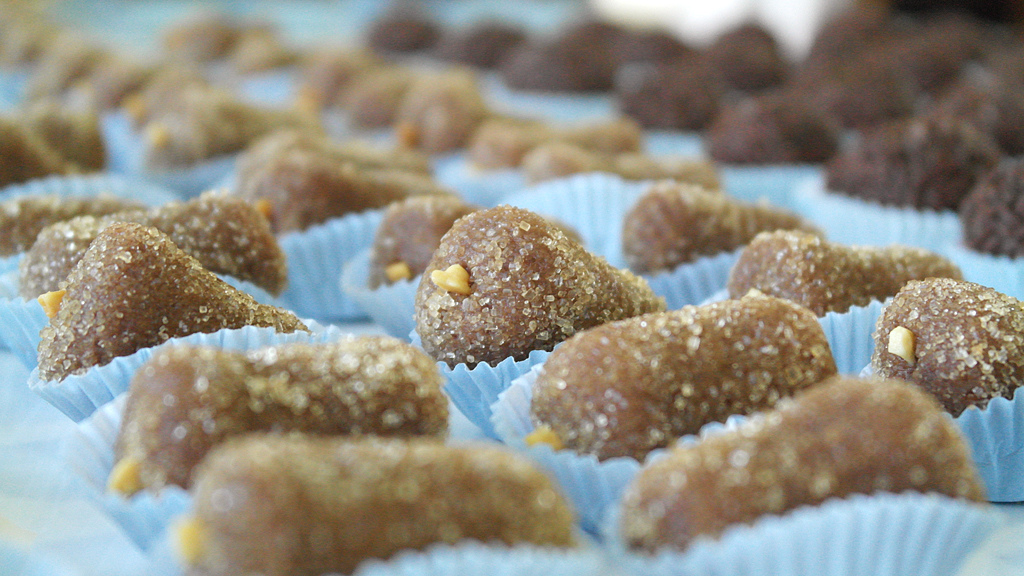
Cajuzinho

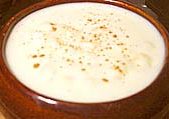
Canjica

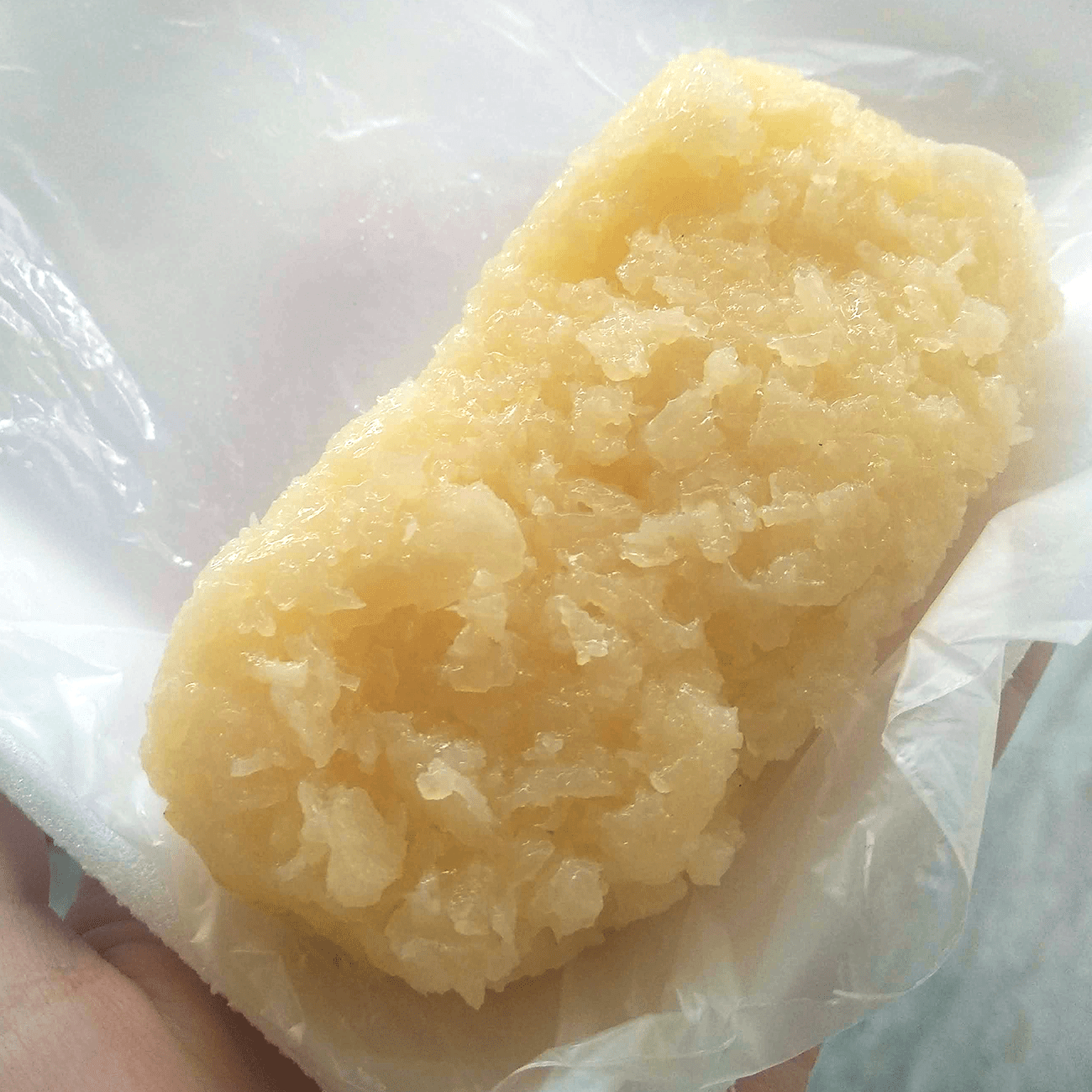
Cocada

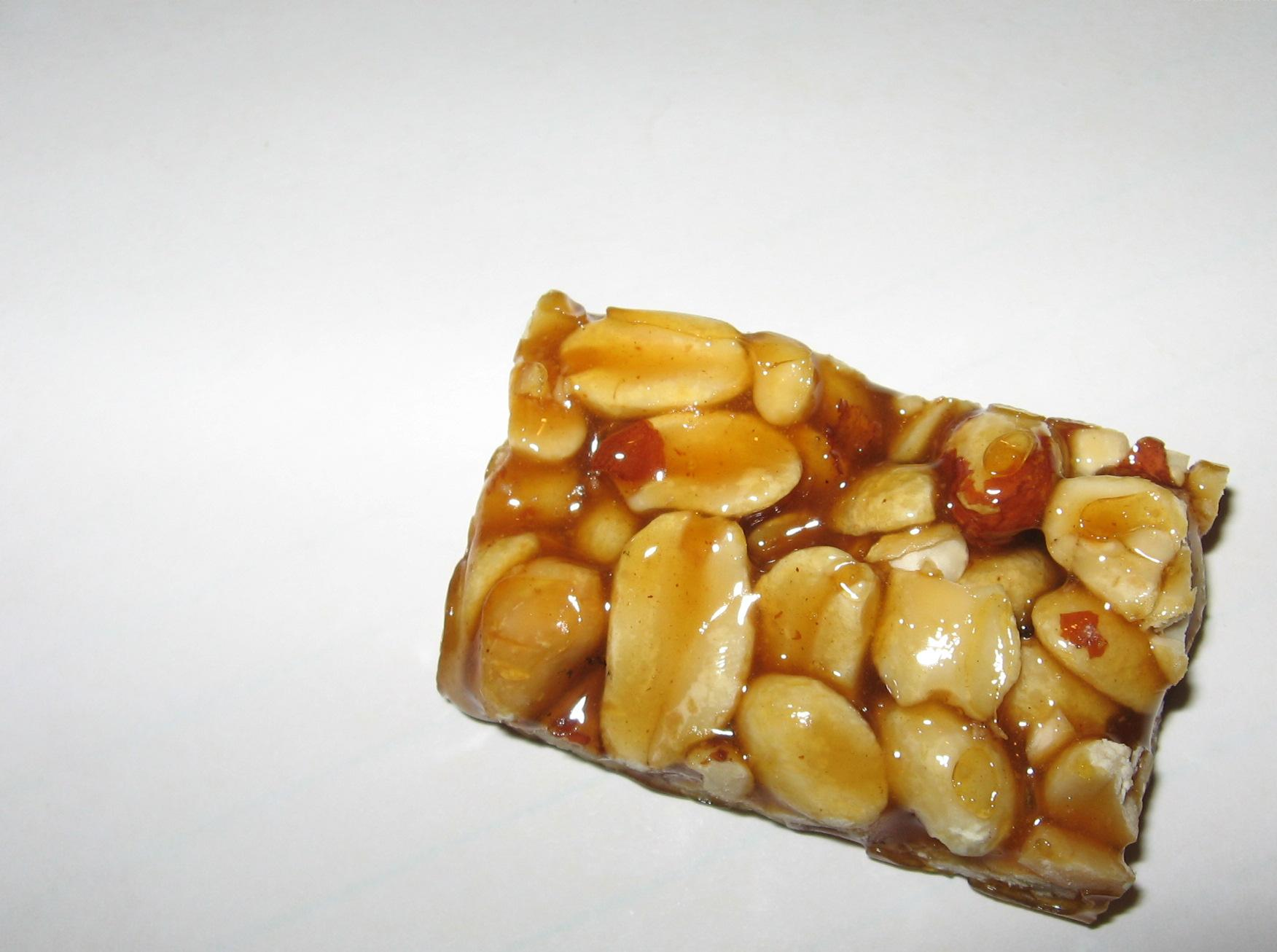
Commercially prepared pé-de-moleque

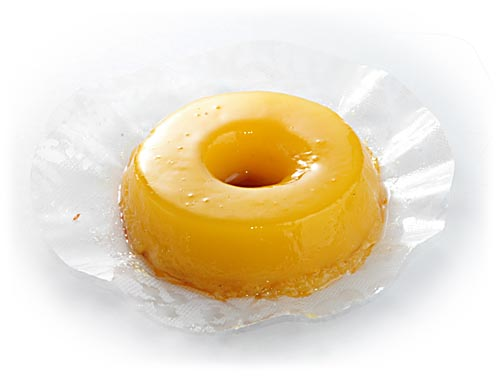
Quindim

== See also ==
- List of Brazilian dishes
- List of desserts
