= Guava jelly =

Guava jelly may refer to:

- Goiabada
- Bocadillo
- Guava Jelly (song)
