= Marmelada de Santa Luzia =

Quince cheese variant from Goiás, Brazil

- Course: Dessert or snack
- Place of origin: Brazil
- Region or state: Cidade Ocidental and Luziânia in Goiás
- Associated cuisine: Brazilian

Marmelada de Santa Luzia (Portuguese: [maɣmeˈlada ʤɪ ˈsɐ͂ta luˈzia] lit. 'Quince Jam from Santa Luzia') is a variety of quince cheese that is traditional to the Brazilian state of Goiás. The confection is produced in the municipalities of Cidade Ocidental and Luziânia primarily by artisans of quilombola descent. In 2022, the confection was recognized as an Immaterial Cultural Heritage of Goiás.

== Preparation ==
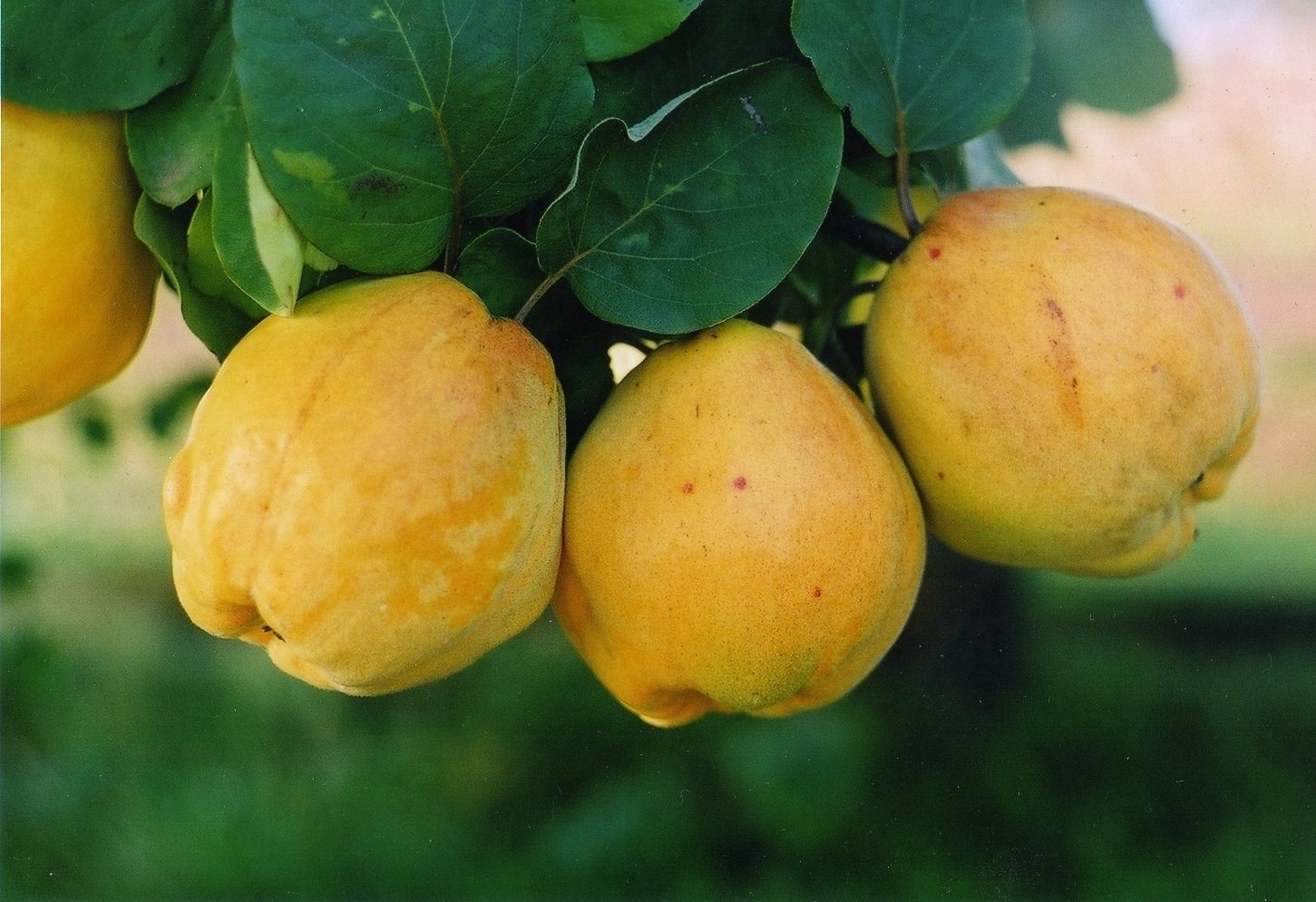
Quince fruit, such as used in Marmelada de Santa Luzia, on a tree

The Marmelada de Santa Luzia is made artisanally by marmelada producers at their farms and homes. There are at least three producer associations in the regions of Cidade Ocidental and Luziânia that produce Marmelada de Santa Luzia: the Association of Small Rural Producers of Mesquita and Água Quente (Associação dos Pequenos Produtores Rurais do Mesquita e Água Quente, APROMAQ), the Mesquita Quilombo Renovation Association (Associação Renovadora do Quilombo Mesquita, AREQUIM), and the Association of Small Rural Producers of Xavier (Associação dos Pequenos Produtores Rurais de Xavier). There are around 30 quince fruit producers and 10 marmelada producers (Note: One source claims that there are 27 quince fruit producers and around 70 marmelada producers.) between both organizations. Each marmelada producer has an annual production of 1,000 kilograms (2,200 pounds) on average.

The recipe used to make Marmelada de Santa Luzia has been passed down through generations. The quince fruit that is used is a variety of Portuguese quince and is harvested when it ripens in January. The fruit is prepared by removing the hairs on the outside of the fruit with a cloth and removing its seeds. The fruit is then ground into a paste, run through a sieve to remove large solids, and then stirred with a wooden spoon in a copper pan with sugar syrup or sugar until reaching the desired consistency. The confection is then scooped into small wooden boxes that are also produced by the artisans, wherein it can be preserved for up to a year. The wood from local Samanea saman or Didymopanax macrocarpus trees is used as it does not influence the taste of the marmelada.

In recent years, the artisanal production of Marmelada de Santa Luzia has decreased drastically due to competition with regional companies who industrialize the production of marmelada and import quince fruit from outside the region.

== Use ==
The texture of Marmelada de Santa Luzia is similar to goiabada, but the flavor is not as sweet.

Marmelada de Santa Luzia is typically eaten after meals as a dessert or with local cheeses in the manner of Romeu e Julieta. Additionally, it can be eaten with requeijão, avocado, or mixed with milk in smoothies. According to one marmelada producer, it can also be eaten immediately after it has been made while it is still warm.

== History ==
The first quince fruit sapling was brought to Santa Luzia, a region that is today the municipality of Luziânia, in 1770 and was planted by João Pereira Guimarães at his farm, the Engenho da Palma farm. The sapling was either brought by boiaderos from Minas Gerais or a Portuguese royal from the house of Bragança. The conditions in the region were ideal for the fruit and saplings from that tree were planted at farms such as Ponte Alta, Barreiros, Jataí, Vargem, Mesquita, Santa Bárbara, Riacho Frio, and Saia Velha, where they became extensive orchards. These orchards were used to produce quince cheese, which became the major mover of the local economy. A 1951 book regarding the interior of Brazil in 1817 and 1821 noted that the residents of Santa Luzia primarily worked with making "a famous quince cheese that is known all the way in Rio de Janeiro".

The production of this confectionery was done primarily by enslaved Afro-Brazilians. Many modern day marmelada producers are descendants of quilombolas who continued to produce Marmelada de Santa Luzia after escaping slavery and forming quilombos in the region of Luziânia. Some of these quilombos, such as Quilombo Mesquita and Quilombo Xavier, still exist and produce marmelada using recipes that have been passed down through generations.

The largest quince fruit orchards existed in the 20th century but were gradually replaced by industrialization or field crops such as soy. The introduction of new crops introduced pests and diseases which further decreased the quince orchards and led to different various quince fruit cultivars being planted.

=== Cultural impact ===
The first Festa do Marmelo (Quince Fruit Festival) was held in Cidade Ocidental in 2002. The event is held annually in November and attracts thousands of visitors. The event serves to recognize the importance of the confection in the region and for producers to sell their product.

In May 2022, State Law No. 21.278, passed under the governorship of Ronaldo Caiado, recognized Marmelada de Santa Luzia as a Patrimônio Cultural Imaterial (Immaterial Cultural Heritage) of Goiás.

Marmelada de Santa Luzia is mentioned in the Anthem of the Municipality of Luziânia established by Municipal Law No. 1959, of 18 March 1997.

Marmelada de Santa Luzia won the first place award in the sweets category at the Centennial Exhibition of 1876 in Philadelphia, United States.
