= Apple cheese =

Traditional Lithuanian dessert

Apple cheese Obuolių sūris
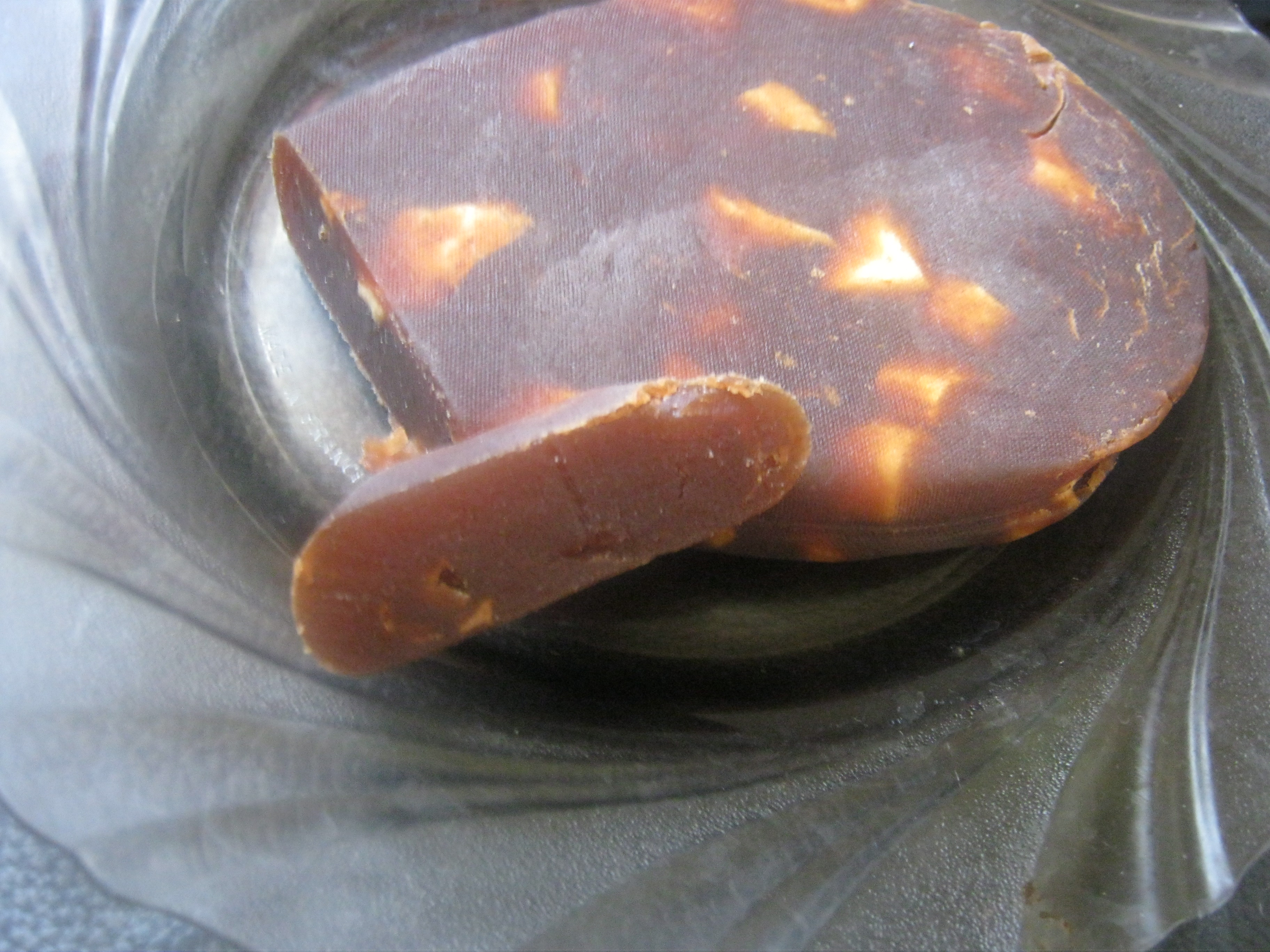
- Lithuanian apple cheese
- Type: Confection
- Place of origin: Lithuania, Poland
- Main ingredients: Apples, sugar or honey
- Food energy (per serving): 323 kcal (1,350 kJ)

Apple cheese (Lithuanian: Obuolių sūris, Polish: Ser Jabłkowy/Ser Jabłeczny) is a traditional Lithuanian and Polish dessert, made out of boiled or cooked apples sweetened with sugar. Originally it was made with honey, which was later replaced by sugar.

== History ==
Apple cheese originated in the Middle Ages. The oldest dated recipe was written by the cook in the house of Radvila (Radziwiłł).

In 1907, the recipe for apple cheese was published in the Lithuanian magazine Lietuvos virėja from Lithuania's capital Vilnius.

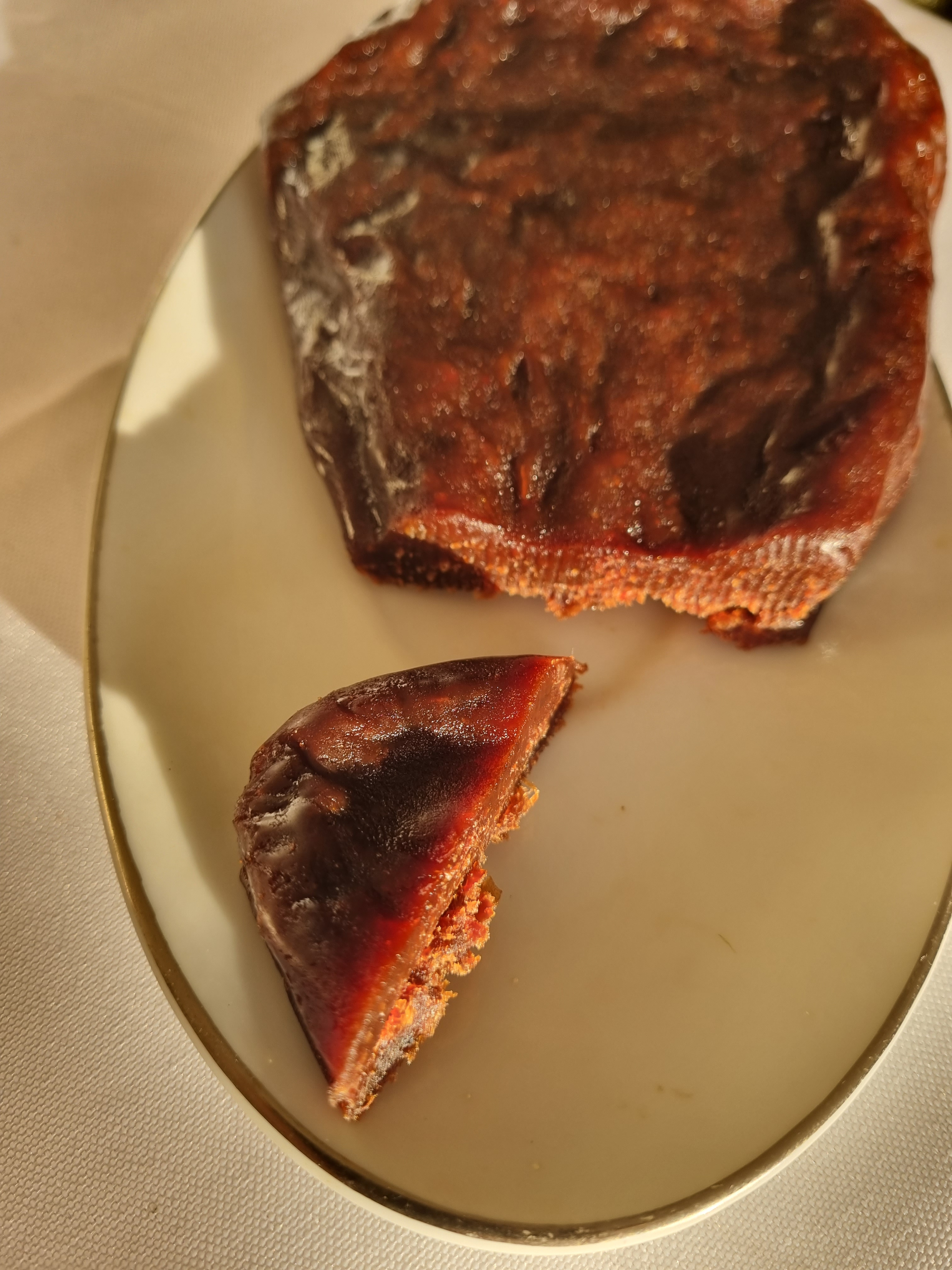
Apple cheese from Trakai region, Lithuania

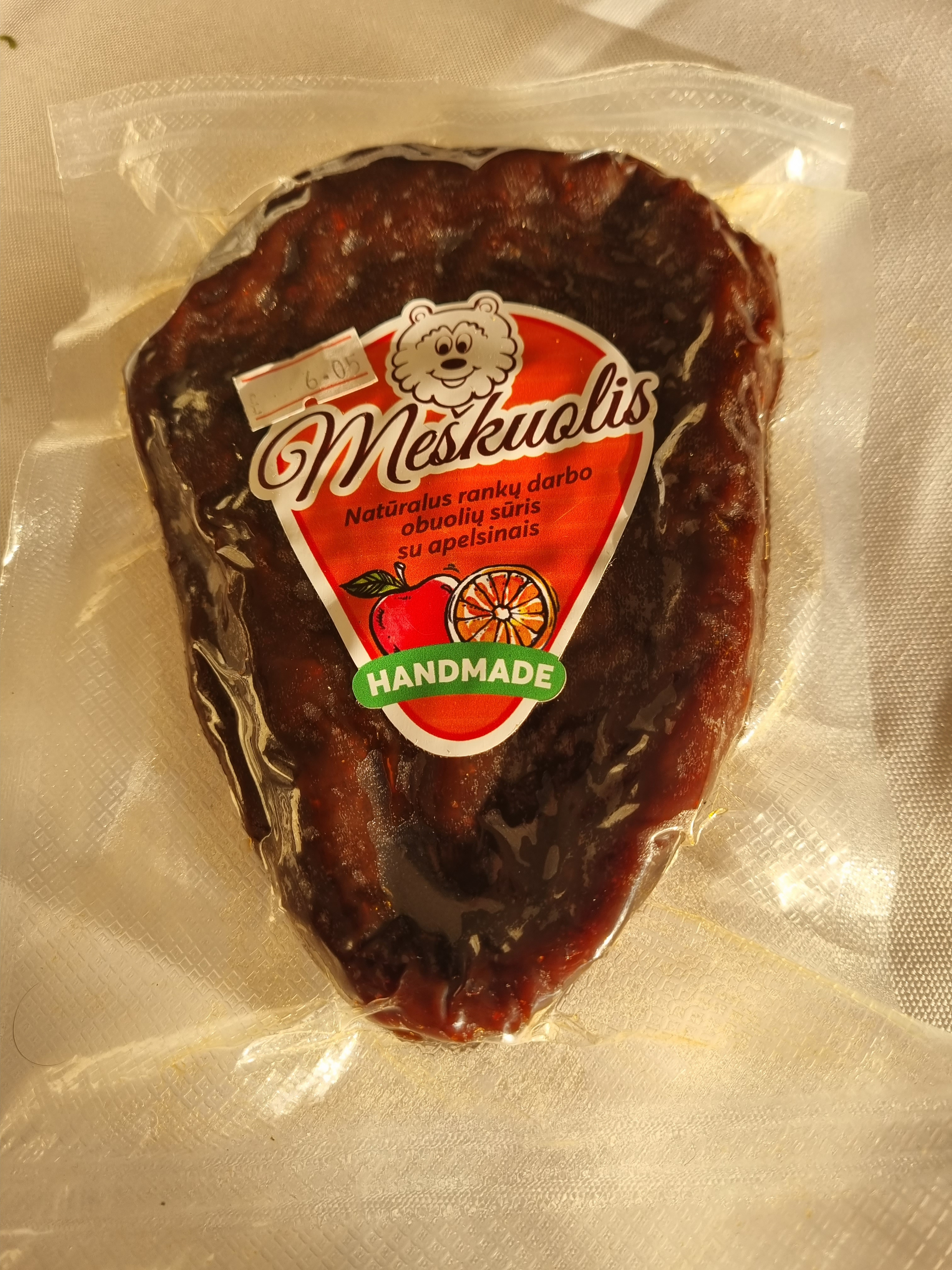
Prepackaged apple cheese from Lithuania sold in England

== See also ==
- Guava cheese
- Quince cheese
