= Cassava cake (disambiguation) =

Cassava cake is a cassava-based dessert from the Philippines.

Cassava cake can also refer to:

== Cakes ==
- Bánh khoai mì, baked or steamed cakes of cassava flour and coconut milk from Vietnam
- Cassava pone (or yuca cake), a type of pone from the Caribbean and Africa made using cassava and grated coconut
- Bolo de mandioca (Cassava cake), a Brazilian cake such as mané pelado that uses cassava as its main ingredient

== Pancakes ==
- Bammy or bami, a small fried cassava flatbread from Jamaica and Belize

== See also ==
- Cassava-based dishes
