= Mané pelado =

Brazilian shredded yuca cake

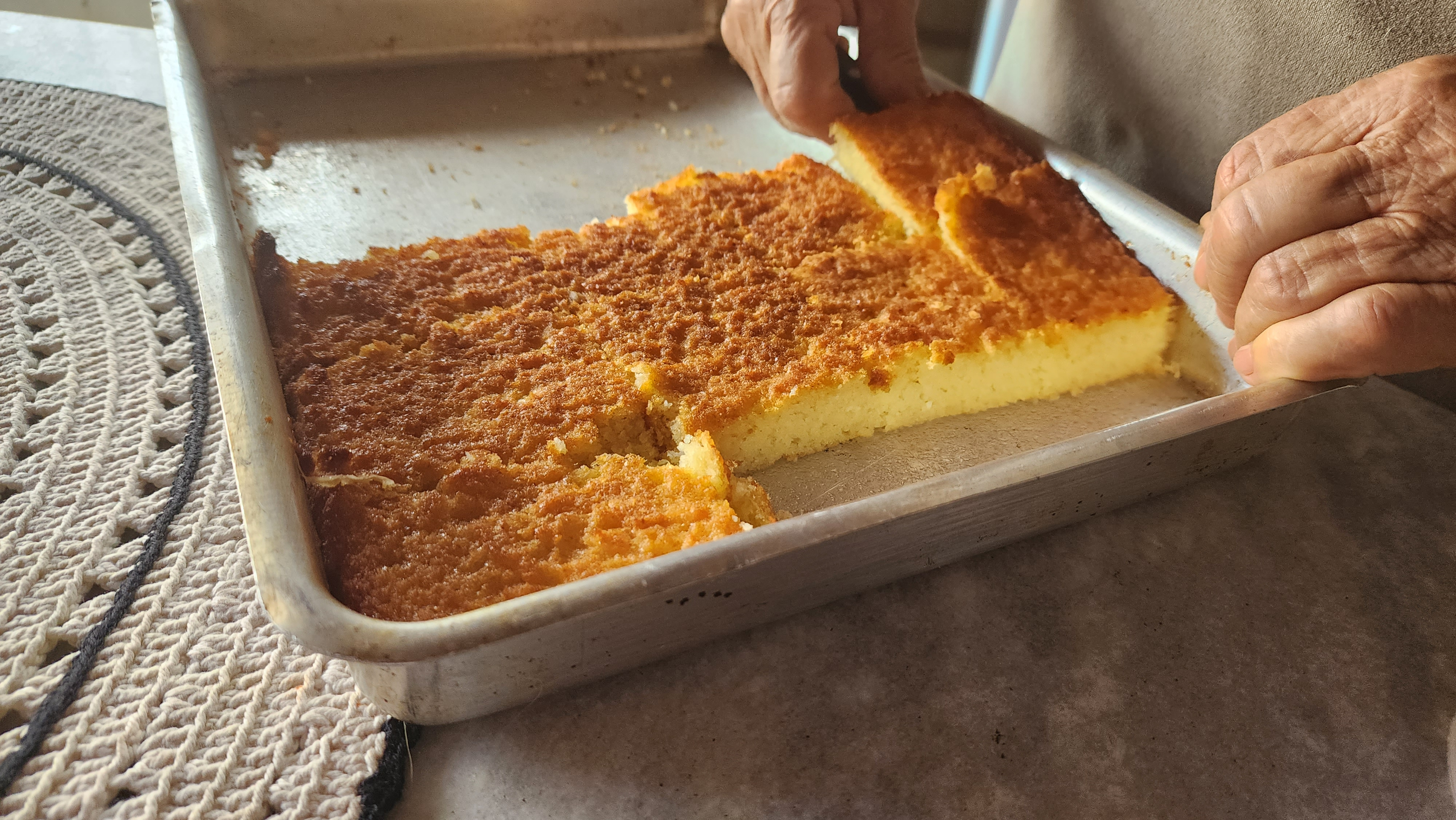
- Homemade mané pelado
- Type: Cake
- Place of origin: Brazil
- Region or state: Goiás
- Main ingredients: Yuca, cheese, shredded coconut

Mané pelado (Portuguese: [mɐˈnɛ peˈladu]; lit. 'Naked Mané') or bolo mané pelado is a Brazilian cake traditional to Goiás and the Center-West. It consists of shredded yuca and coconut, and a salted cheese such as canastra cheese or minas cheese. It can be found at regional Festa Juninas in Brazil.

== History ==
The exact origin of the cake is unknown, but there are several urban legends as to how it was created. Some stories tell of a farmer named Manoel or Mané who would sell this cake either shirtless or with an unbuttoned shirt, whereas others claim that the dessert is named after a farmer named Mané who would harvest yuca while naked. Another story tells that the cake is named in honor of a nearby farmer named Mané who provided the yuca used when the recipe was created.

Researchers with Comer História (History of Eating), a project run by the College of Philosophy and Sciences at São Paulo State University, made the claim in 2023 that mané pelado is a derivation of manauê, a Brazilian cake from the colonial period that was adapted from a traditional indigenous Brazilian meal. It was created by the Portuguese after adding eggs, milk, sugar, and fat to an indigenous meal consisting of yuca dough baked in a banana leaf and baking it in a tray instead of in leafs. Mané pelado would have then been developed when coconut and cheese were added to manauê. It would get its name from a gradual shift from "manauê" to "manué" to "mané", with pelado (naked) being added to the end as a reference to how the dessert would be baked in a pan rather than a banana leaf.

== See also ==
- List of cakes
- List of Brazilian sweets and desserts
