= Cajuzinho =

Brazilian nut confectionery

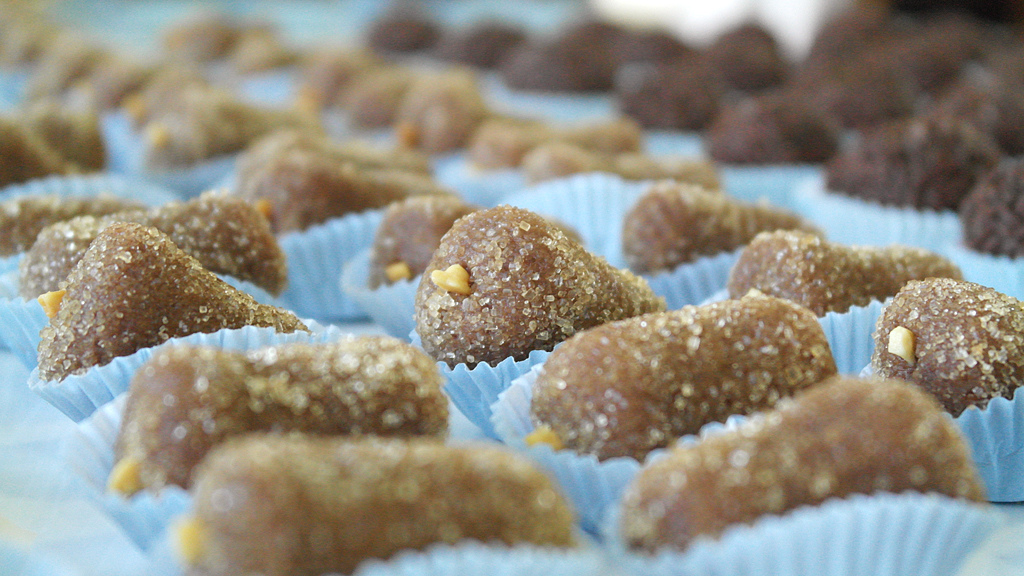
- Course: Confectionery
- Place of origin: Brazil
- Serving temperature: At normal temperature.
- Main ingredients: Peanuts, cashew nuts and sugar
- Variations: Rounded cajuzinho, almond cajuzinho

Cajuzinho Portuguese pronunciation: [kaʒu'zĩɲu] (from caju, "cashew"; literally, "little cashew") is a popular sweet with an almost ubiquitous presences in Brazilian parties. It is made of peanuts, cashew nuts and sugar and is shaped like a tiny cashew, although it does taste strongly of peanut.

== See also ==
- List of Brazilian dishes
- List of Brazilian sweets and desserts
- Beijinho
- Brigadeiro
- Olho-de-sogra
