= Creme de papaya =

Brazilian dessert

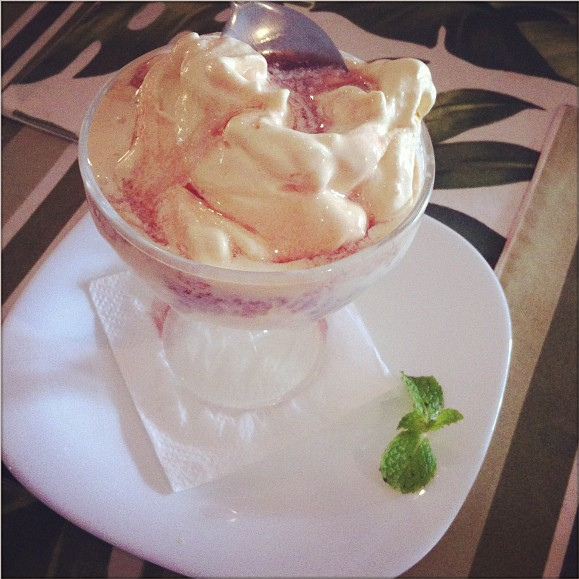
- Alternative names: Creme de Papaia
- Place of origin: Brazil
- Serving temperature: Cold
- Main ingredients: Papaya, vanilla ice cream, crème de cassis or blackcurrant syrup

Creme de papaya (Crème de Papaia), also known as papaya mousse, is a Brazilian dessert. It was a culinary fad in São Paulo in the 1990s, and became a popular menu item at top restaurants in the city.

It consists of papaya blended with vanilla ice cream. Crème de cassis is usually added, but a non-alcoholic blackcurrant syrup can be substituted. It is common to blend the papaya and ice cream, then put into serving dish and pour about an ounce of creme de cassis on top.

== See also ==
- List of Brazilian sweets and desserts
