= Bijajica =

Brazilian cassava cookies

Bijajica is a Brazilian cookie, popular in the state of Santa Catarina. Produced on the mountainous plateau region of Lages, its ingredients are cassava starch, eggs and sugar, all fried in lard.

== See also ==
- List of Brazilian sweets and desserts
