= Beijinho =

Brazilian birthday party candy

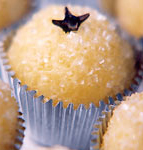
- Alternative names: Branquinho (in Rio Grande do Sul)
- Type: Confectionery
- Place of origin: Brazil
- Main ingredients: Grated coconut, condensed milk

Beijinho (Portuguese pronunciation: [bej'ʒĩɲu]; "little kiss" in English), also known as branquinho ("little white one"), is a typical Brazilian birthday party candy prepared with condensed milk, grated desiccated coconut, rolled over caster sugar or grated coconut and frequently topped with a clove.

Beijinho is the coconut version of the Brazilian brigadeiro. When rolled, it can be covered with granulated sugar or grated coconut. Traditionally a single clove is stuck in the top of the candy.

It is believed that Beijinho was originally called "Nun's kiss" and formerly made with almonds, water and sugar.

== See also ==
- Brigadeiro
- Cajuzinho
- List of Brazilian dishes
- List of Brazilian sweets and desserts
- Olho-de-sogra
