= Maria-mole =

Brazilian dessert

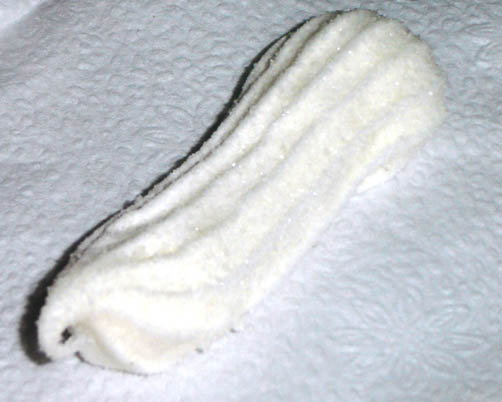
- A small piece of maria-mole.
- Course: Dessert
- Place of origin: Brazil
- Created by: Antonio Bergamo

Maria-mole (Portuguese pronunciation: [ma'ɾiɐ 'mɔli]; lit. 'limp Mary') is a dessert popular in Brazil that is similar to a marshmallow. Maria-mole's base ingredients are sugar, gelatin and egg whites. It is usually covered in grated coconut and made without the addition of any other flavors, although there are variations.

The dessert was created by Antonio Bergamo, a Brazilian candy maker of Italian descent. While trying to use leftover egg whites, he managed to make a firm meringue and decided to add gelatin to it. After the meringue was cool, he noted that it hadn't gotten as firm as he expected, and called it Maria-mole ("soft" or "limp" Mary).

== See also ==
- List of Brazilian dishes
- List of Brazilian sweets and desserts
