= Minas cheese =

Brazilian cheese

Minas Cheese
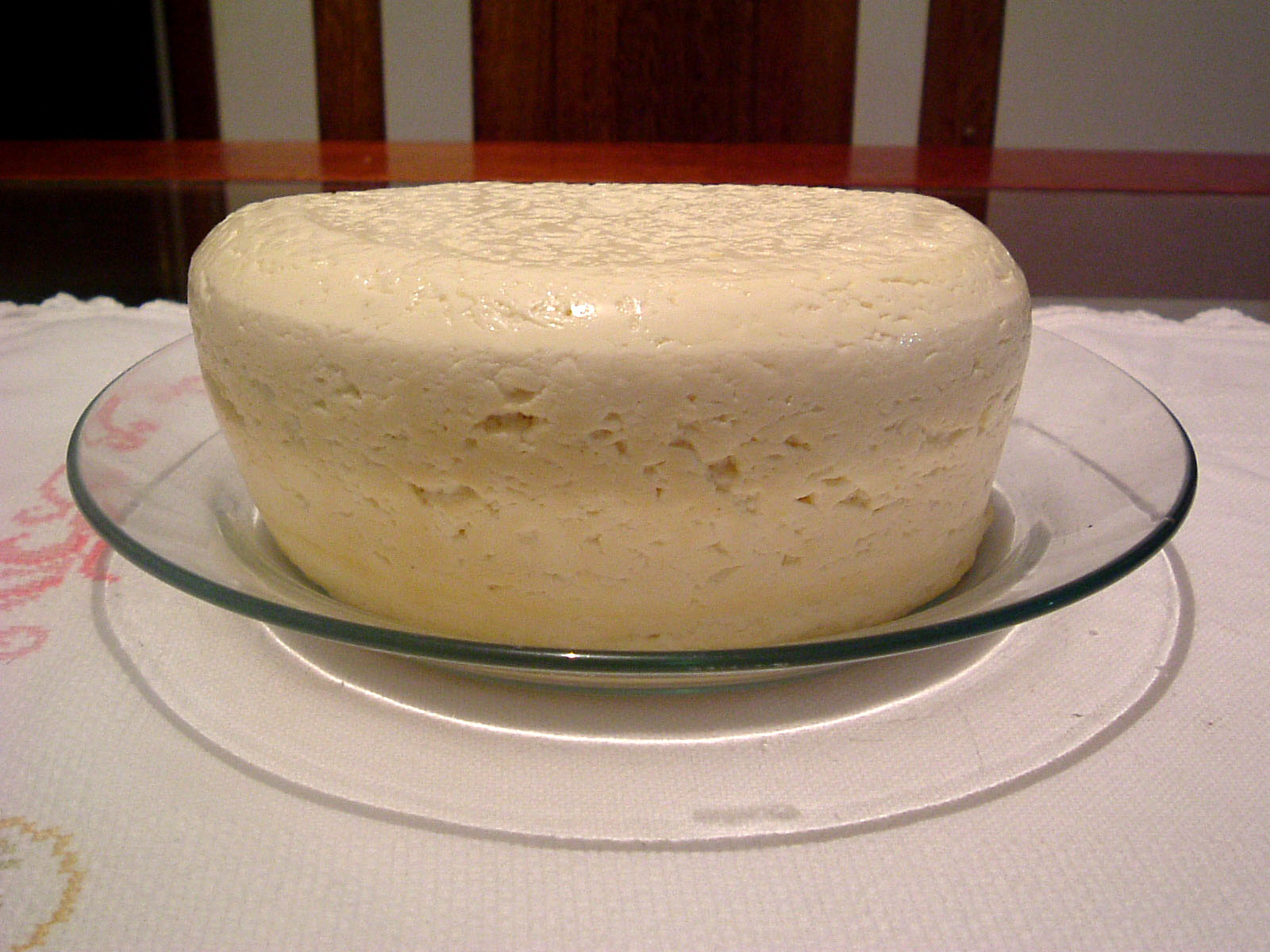
- Country of origin: Brazil
- Region: Minas Gerais
- Source of milk: Cow
- Texture: semi-soft
- Fat content: Depends on variety
- Aging time: Depends on variety
- Certification: No

Traditional ways of making Artisan Minas Cheese in Minas Gerais
- UNESCO Intangible Cultural Heritage
- Country: Brazil
- Reference: 02102
- Region: Latin America and the Caribbean

Inscription history
- Inscription: 2024 (19th session)
- List: Representative

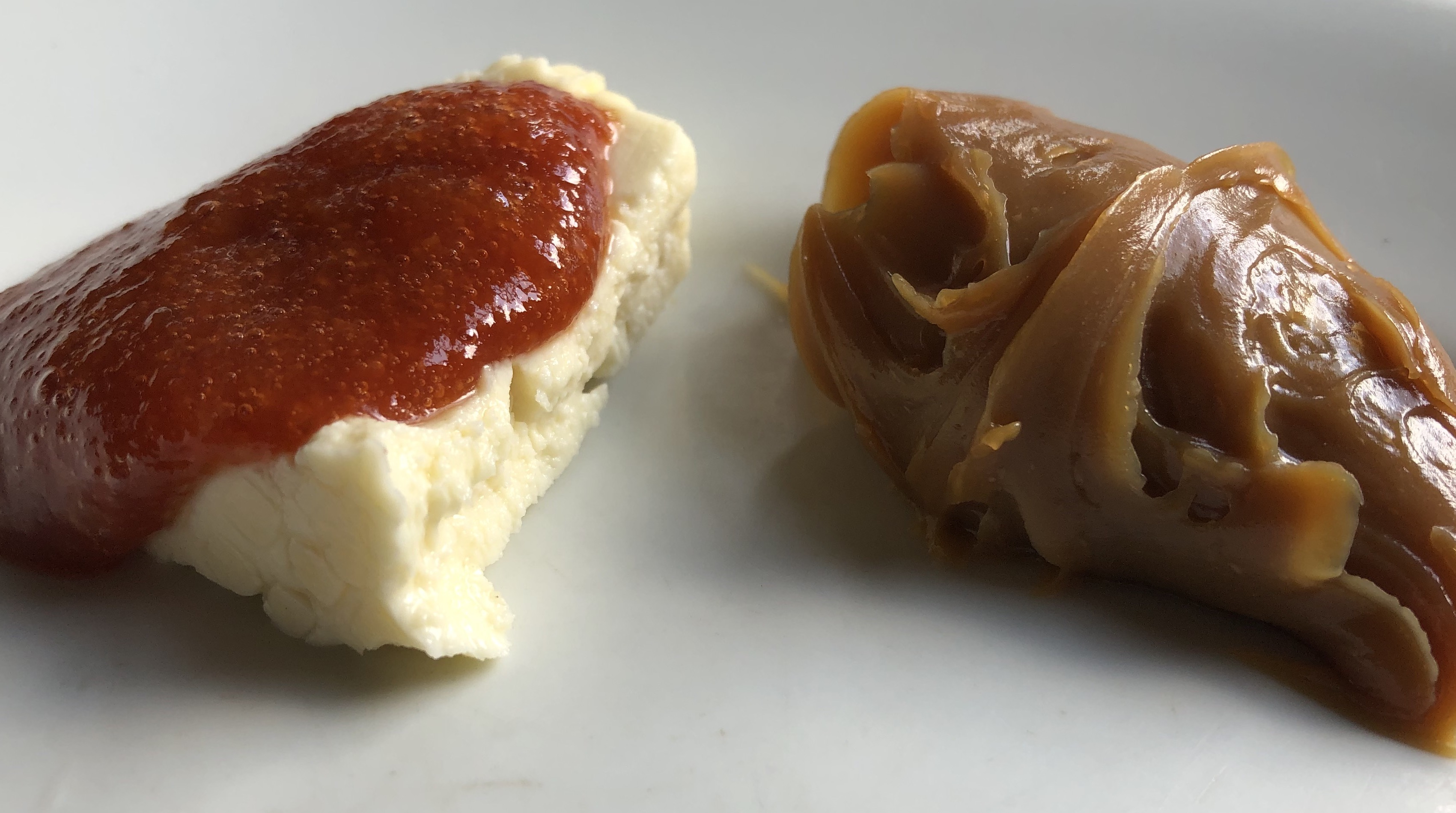
Romeu e Julieta to the left of a dollop of doce de leite.

Minas cheese (queijo minas or Portuguese: queijo-de-minas, pronounced [ˈkejʒu (dʒi) ˈmĩnɐs], literally "cheese from Minas") is a type of cheese that has been traditionally produced in the Brazilian state of Minas Gerais.

Production of authentic Queijo Minas Artesanal (QMA) remains overwhelmingly concentrated among small, family-run independent farms. Government sources estimate that the state of Minas Gerais has approximately 30,000 such artisinal cheese producers .

It comes in three varieties, named queijos-de-minas frescal (fresh), meia-cura (half-aged) and curado (aged). A fourth variety, branded as queijo padrão ("standard" cheese), has been developed more recently and can be found in nearly all supermarkets and grocery stores in Brazil. It is similar to frescal, but not as immensely juicy, soft and mild, and also generally less salty.

Minas cheese is made from cow's milk according to traditional recipes. It used to be matured naturally in the open air or, much less often, over a cooker to dry with the heat. Primarily used by people who want to have a healthier diet, it is recommended in diets and even for those with gastritis.

Frescal cheese (as the name implies) is served quite fresh, about 4–10 days after preparation, still white and tender. Good frescal must be juicy, soft, and slightly granulated (instead of rubbery), with a mild taste. The saltiness of its taste might vary widely across producers.

It is not suitable for cooking, except with beef or pork (the juice helps enhance its taste), or as an ingredient in a wider recipe, grilled with sauces such as soy sauce, until it becomes rubbery. It can be used to make sandwiches, pastries, and crêpes, but it gets slightly rubbery instead of stringy with heat. It pairs well with turkey breast and other low-fat cold cuts, cooked onions, tomatoes, as well as salad rockets, cooked spinach and other strong-tasting vegetables.

Curado cheese is ready for consumption when the juice has evaporated and the cheese has solidified, acquiring a yellowish tint. Good curado cheese must have a white core, punctured with tiny bubbles of air, slightly more granulated than frescal and with a stronger taste, tending to be bitter. It is excellent for cooking, being used for a huge variety of dishes of all types, including pastel de queijo and the famous pão de queijo (cheese bun).

Frescal cheese is often served with goiabada, a sweet product made from guavas similar to quince cheese. When these two flavors are combined, it is known as Romeu e Julieta, and this combination can be eaten as it is or used in a wide variety of dishes like cake, pie or ice cream. Frescal cheese also pairs well with other forms of fruit preserves or Doce de Leite.

In December 2024, Minas cheese was recognized by UNESCO as an Intangible cultural heritage.

== See also ==
- Brazilian cuisine
- Requeijão
- Coffee production in Brazil
- List of Brazilian dishes
- List of cheeses
- Cachaça
