= Quince cheese =

Fruit jelly confection

Quince paste
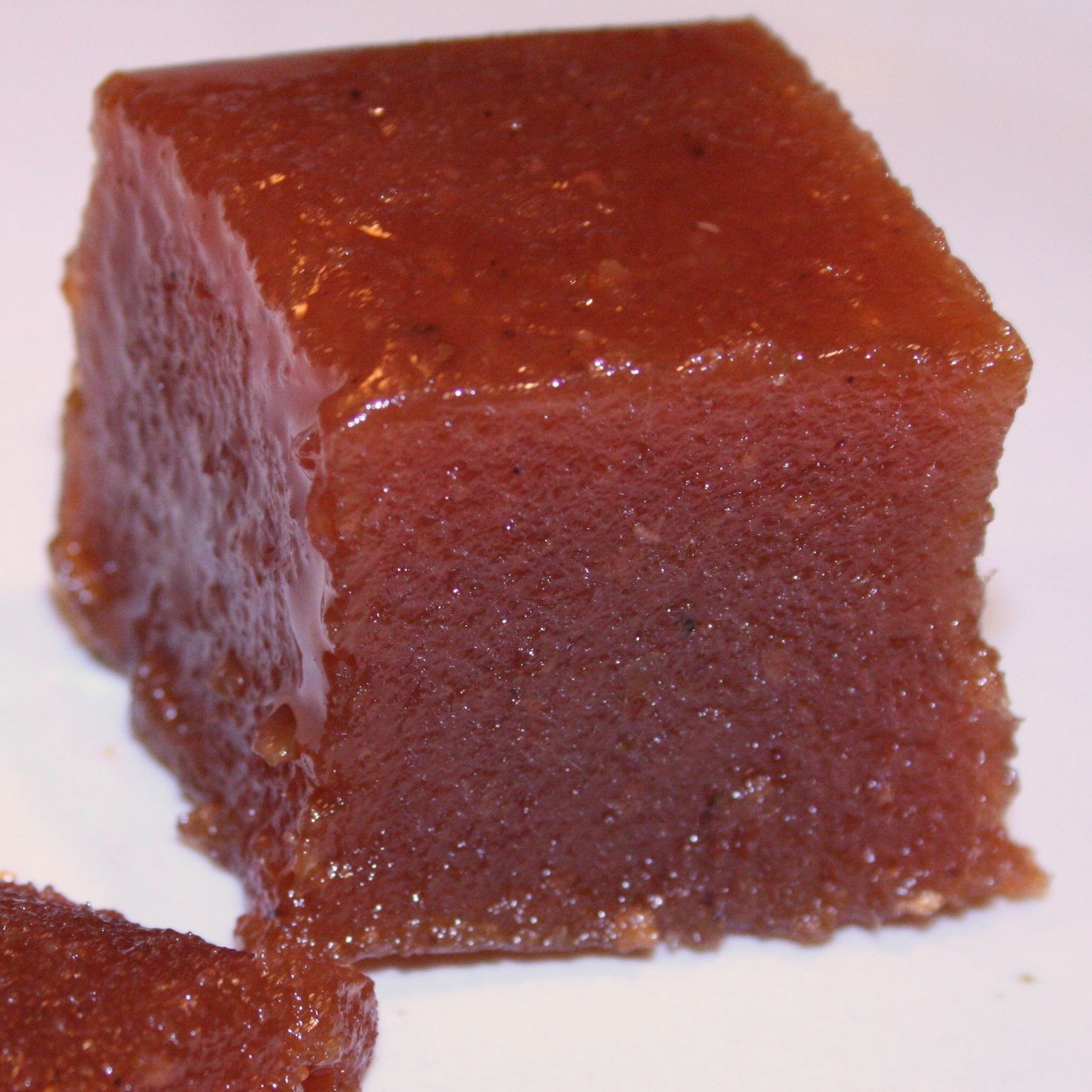
- Type: Jelly
- Place of origin: Portugal; Italy; Spain
- Main ingredients: Quince, sugar

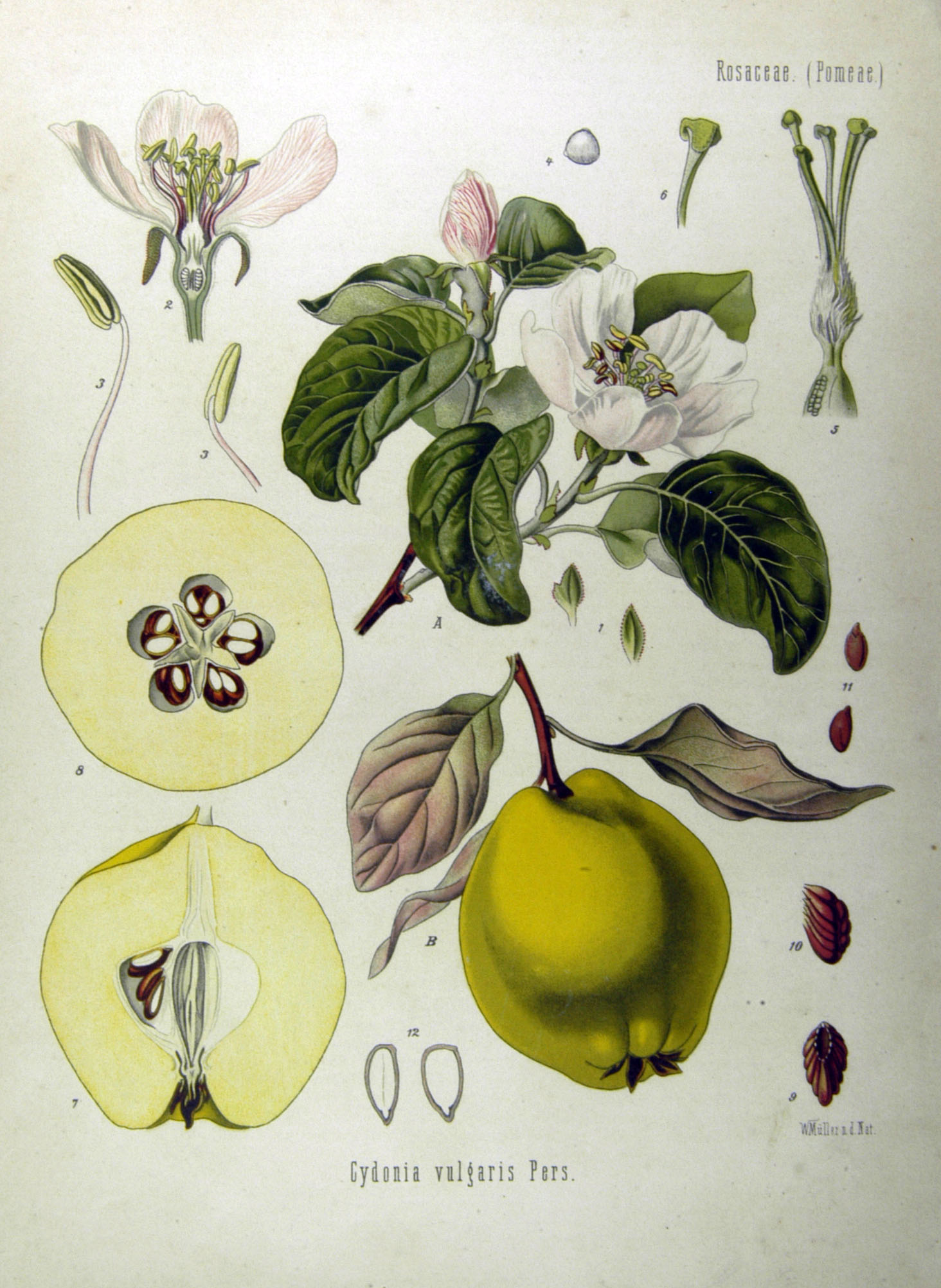
The quince is a hard, golden yellow fruit

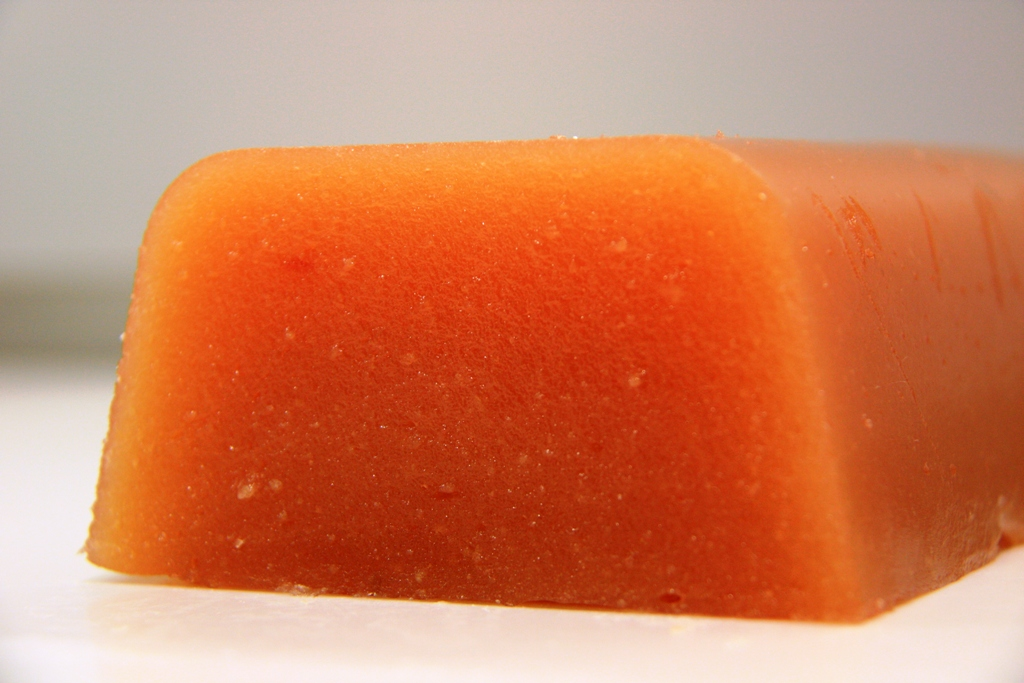
Dulce de membrillo

Quince cheese (also known as quince paste) is a sweet and tart, thick jelly made of the pulp of the quince fruit. It is a common confection in several countries.

In West Asia and the Balkans/Southeastern Europe, it is known as loz-e beh in Iran, ayva peltesi in Turkey, ממבריו (membrio) in Israel, κυδωνόπαστο (kydonopasto) in Greece, kitnikez in Serbia, marmeladă de gutui in Romania, and birsalmasajt in Hungary.

In the Iberian Peninsula and broader Southwestern Europe, this traditionally Mediterranean food is known by various names: ate, dulce de membrillo or carne de membrillo in Spanish; marmelada or doce de marmelo in Portuguese; marmelo in Galician; marmiellu in Asturian; irasagarra in Basque; and codonyat in Catalan. It is a firm, sticky, sweet, reddish paste made from the quince fruit (Cydonia oblonga). Similar preparations are popular across different cultures, such as pâte de coing in French-speaking regions, Quittenpästli in Switzerland, and cotognata in Italy. Puente Genil, in Spain, is the main world producer, being the home of El Quijote, the most important global factory in terms of quince cheese production.

In Latin America, it is enjoyed in Mexico, Colombia, Argentina, Uruguay, Paraguay, and Chile as ate or dulce de membrillo, and known as machacado de membrillo in Peru.

== History ==
Quince came from the Minoan port of Kydonia. The recipe for quince cheese is probably of ancient origin; the ancient Greeks were great quince producers and made quince cheese, sweetening it with honey. The Roman cookbook of Apicius, a collection of Roman cookery recipes compiled in the late 4th or early 5th century AD, also gives recipes for stewing quince with honey.

Historically, marmalade was made from quince. The English word "marmalade" comes from the Portuguese word marmelada, meaning "quince preparation" (and used to describe quince cheese or quince jam; "marmelo" = "quince"). The word ultimately comes from Latin melimelum, itself from the Greek melimelon (Greek: μελίμηλον) meaning "honey apple" or "sweet apple".

Nowadays (in English), "A marmalade is a jellied fruit product which holds suspended within it all or part of the fruit pulp and the sliced peel. It is prepared from pulpy fruits, preferably those that contain pectin. Citrus fruits are especially desirable because of their flavor and pectin content."

== Preparation ==
Quince cheese is prepared with quince fruits. The fruit is peeled and cored, and cooked with a teaspoon of water and from 500 to 1000 g sugar per kg of quince pulp, preferably in a pressure cooker, but it can also be left for longer (40 minutes–1 hour) in a regular pot, in this case with a little more water (which will then evaporate). It turns a light brick colour in the pressure cooker and on a regular pot, after a long cooking time, dark brick colour. After leaving it to set for a few days on earthenware/clay bowls (preferable), topped with parchment paper rounds, it becomes a relatively firm quince paste/cheese, dense enough to hold its shape. The taste is sweet but slightly astringent (depending on the amount of sugar used), and it is similar in consistency, flavor and use to guava cheese or guava paste.

Quince jelly is made with the skins and core, including pips, that were discarded when preparing quince cheese. They are cooked until halved in volume and the water is then sieved. For every 1 liter of water, 500 g sugar is added and the concoction is again boiled, until thread point is achieved.

Quince cheese is sold in squares or blocks, then cut into thin slices and spread over toasted bread or sandwiches, plain or with cheese, often served for breakfast or as a snack, with manchego, mató, Picón cheese (Spain), Serra da Estrela cheese or Queijo de Azeitão. It is also often used to stuff pastries.

== Regional variations ==
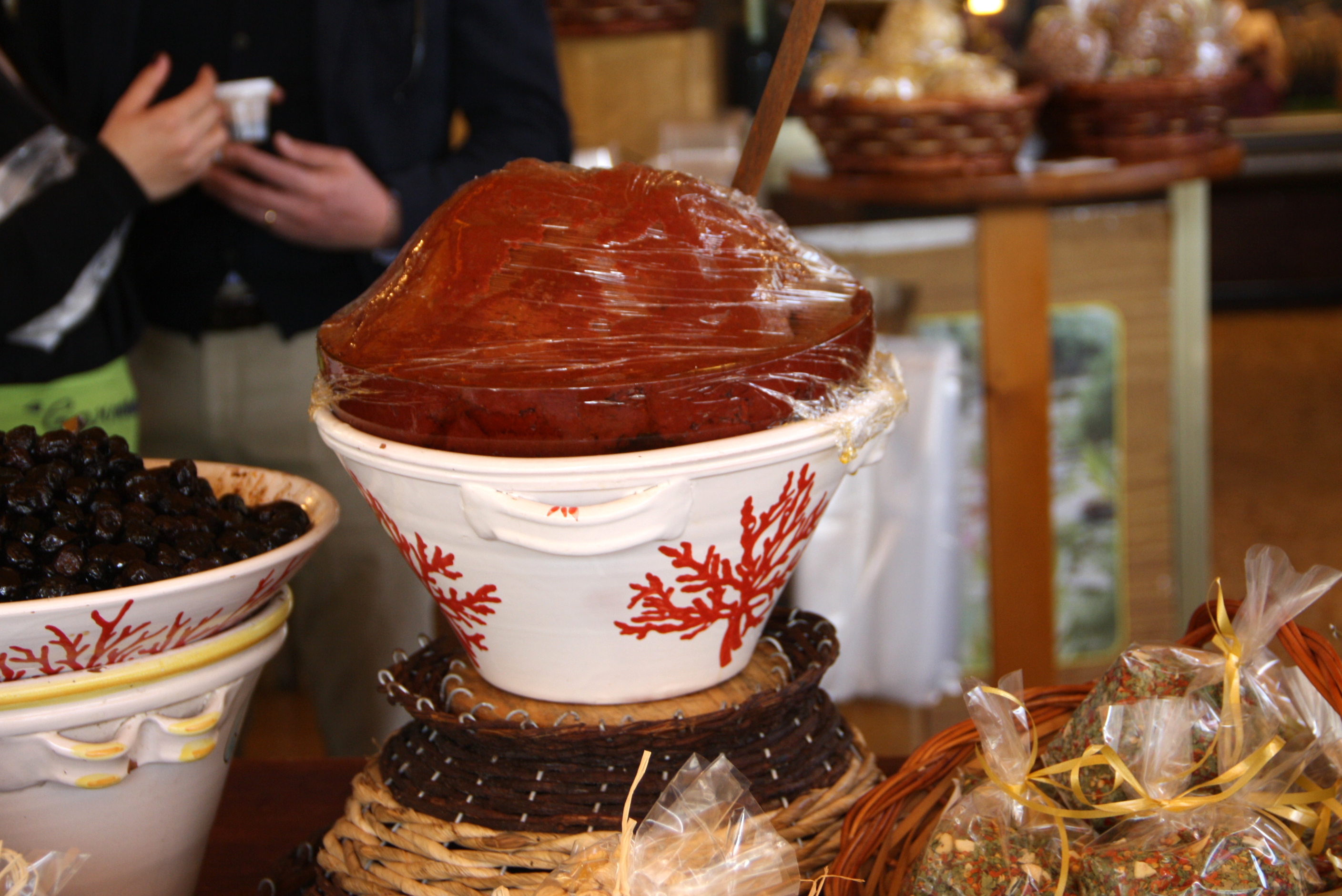
Traditional quince cheese ("cotognata") on display at the Ortygia market in Syracuse, Italy

In Spain, Uruguay, Argentina, Mexico, Chile, and Ecuador, the membrillo (quince) is cooked into a reddish gelatin-like block or firm reddish paste known as dulce de membrillo. Similar confections are made in Argentina, Brazil, Colombia, and Uruguay by replacing quince with other ingredients, such as guavas in Brazil and Colombia, squashes, apricots, and figs in Uruguay, and sweet potatoes in Argentina and Uruguay.

The pastafrola, a sweet tart common in Argentina, Uruguay, and Paraguay, is usually filled with quince paste. In Argentina and Uruguay, a slice of dulce de membrillo (quince cheese) eaten with a slice of soft cheese is considered the national dessert. In Argentina it is referred to as vigilante. In Uruguay it is known as Martín Fierro in reference to the folk character from the epic poem Martín Fierro by Argentinian author José Hernández.

In Brazil, a dessert known as Romeu e Julieta is made with Goiabada, guava paste with a similar consistency to quince cheese, and cheese. In May 2022, a variety of quince cheese known as Marmelada de Santa Luzia was recognized as an Immaterial Cultural Heritage of the Brazilian state of Goiás.

In the Philippines, it is known as membrilyo and is generally made from guava. It is usually served as a dessert during the Christmas Eve dinner (noche buena).

In French "quince paste" or pâte de coing is part of the Provence Christmas traditions and part of the thirteen desserts, which are the traditional dessert foods used in celebrating Christmas in the French region of Provence. In the city of Orléans, the cotignac is a speciality since the middle ages.

In Serbia, especially Vojvodina, all of Hungary, and continental Croatia, i.e., Slavonija quince cheese is an often prepared sweet and is named kitn(i)kes, derived from German "Quittenkäse".

Quince cheese, a New England specialty of the 18th century, required all-day boiling to achieve a solidified state, similar to the French cotignac.

In Hungary, quince cheese is called birsalmasajt, and is prepared with small amounts of lemon zest, cinnamon or cloves and often with peeled walnut inside. Péter Melius Juhász, the Hungarian botanist, mentioned quince cheese as early as 1578 as a fruit preparation with medical benefits.

In Vojvodina, it is sometimes prepared with addition of finely grated walnut, hazelnut or pumpkin seeds. Sometimes a certain amount of sugar would be replaced by an equal amount of linden honey.

== See also ==
- Apple cheese
- Bocadillo
- Goiabada
- Lekvar
- List of spreads
- Thirteen desserts
