= Bolo de rolo =

Brazilian cake from Pernambuco

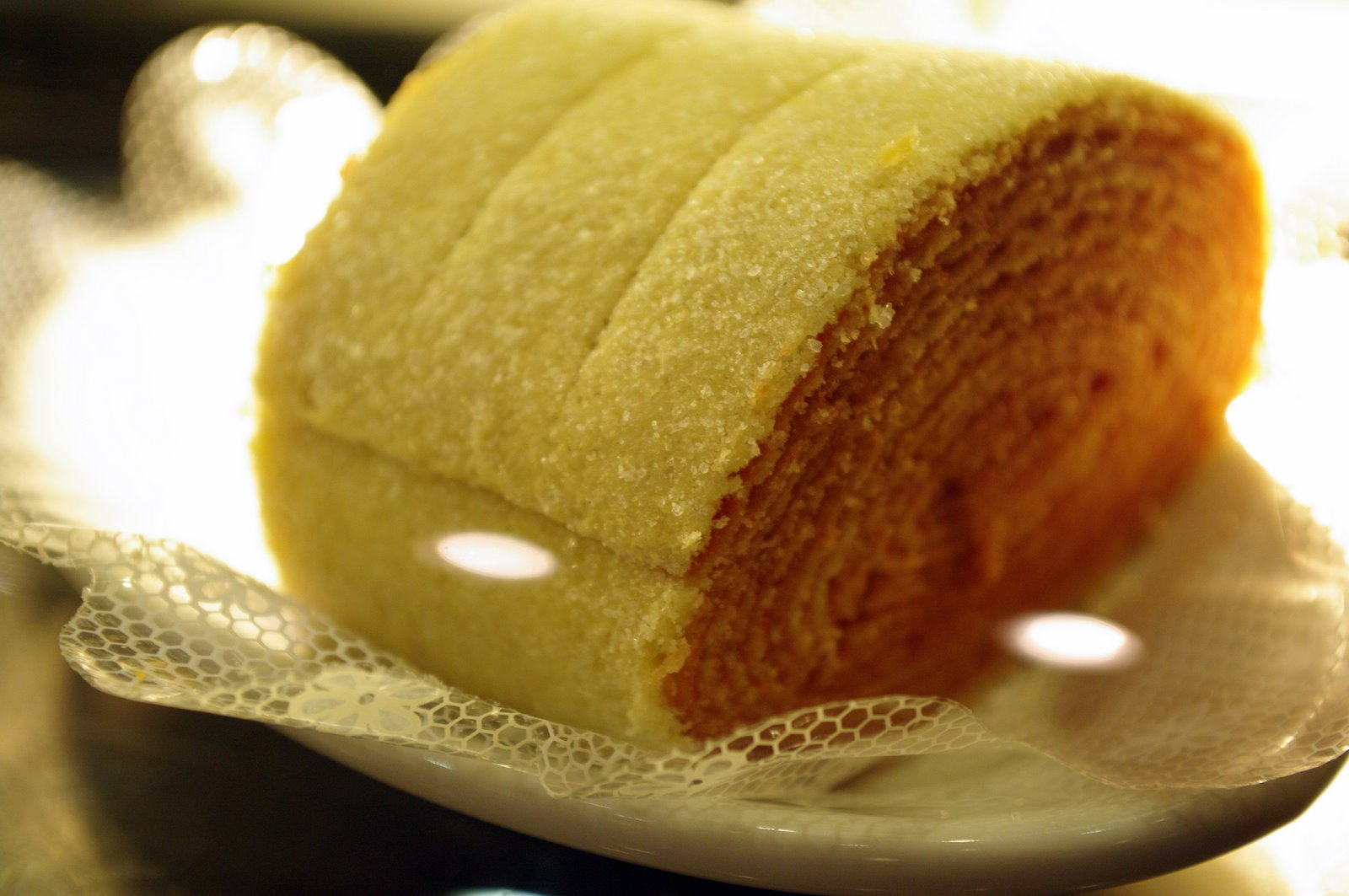
- The bolo de rolo, one of the symbols of Pernambuco.
- Place of origin: Brazil
- Region or state: Pernambuco
- Main ingredients: Flour, eggs, butter, sugar, goiabada

Bolo de rolo (Brazilian Portuguese pronunciation: [ˈbolu ˈdi ˈholu]) (lit. 'roll cake') is a cake from the Brazilian state of Pernambuco. The cake batter is made with flour, eggs, butter and sugar. This dough is wrapped with a layer of guava paste, giving the appearance of a swiss roll with much thinner layers. It is recognized as a national dish in Brazilian law.

== History ==
Its origin lies in the adaptation of Portuguese cake colchão de noiva (lit. 'bride's mattress'), a kind of sponge cake rolled with a filling of nuts. Upon arriving in Brazil, the Portuguese cooks changed the filling to goiabada. It is common to sprinkle the bolo de rolo with sugar for presentation.

The passage of Ordinary Law No. 379/2007 recognized bolo de rolo as intangible heritage of Pernambuco.

== See also ==
- List of Brazilian sweets and desserts
