= Olho de sogra =

Brazilian candy

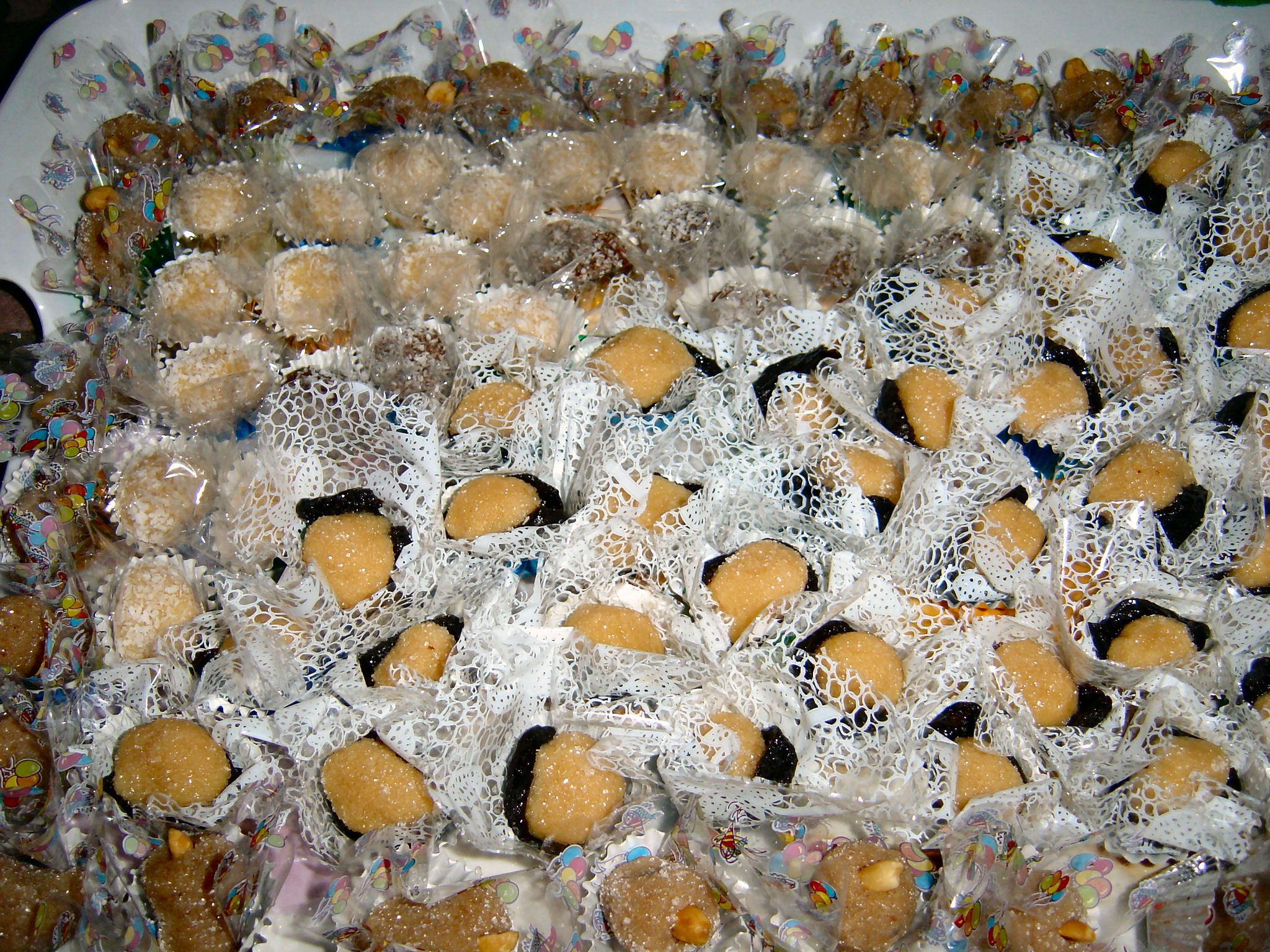
- A large amount of pocket olhos de sogra.
- Type: Confectionery
- Place of origin: Brazil
- Serving temperature: Cold
- Main ingredients: Coconut, condensed milk, egg yolk, plum, sugar

Olho de sogra (‘mother-in-law's eye‘ in Portuguese) is a Brazilian candy, consisting of a beijinho candy inside a dried plum (though some recipes include egg yolk). The final mix is rolled over crystal sugar. The name comes from the shape of the candy, which resembles an eye.

== See also ==
- List of Brazilian sweets and desserts
