= Pavê =

Brazilian layered cake

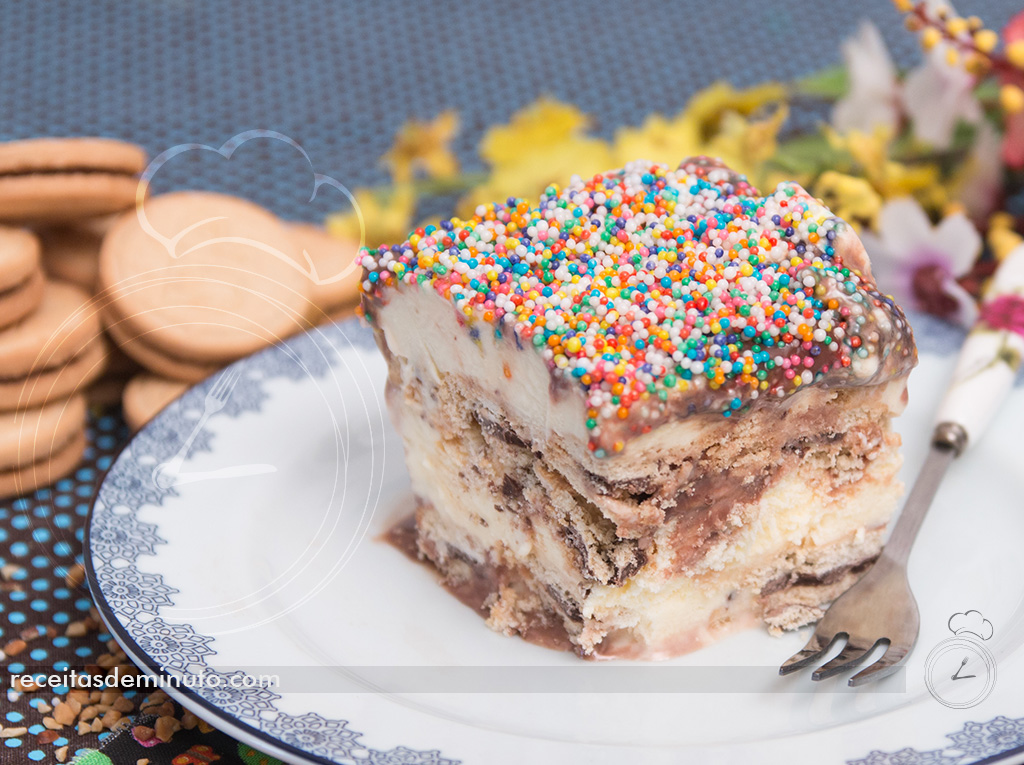
- Course: Dessert
- Place of origin: Brazil
- Invented: 1930s
- Cooking time: 4 hours to 6 hours
- Serving temperature: Cold
- Main ingredients: Condensed milk, ladyfingers or a Marie biscuit-equivalent (corn starch biscuit, or "biscoito de maisena")
- Similar dishes: Tiramisu

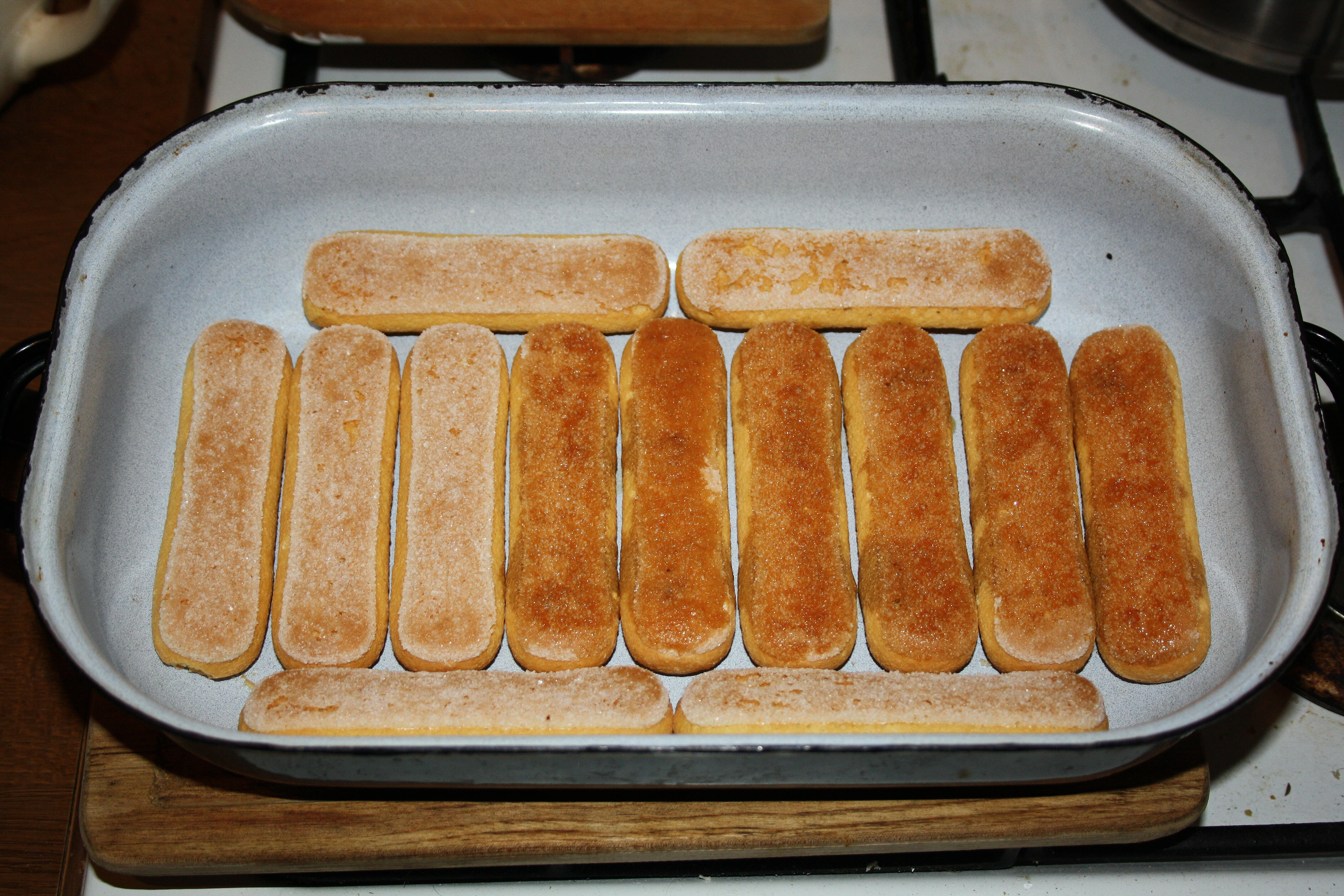
Ladyfinger biscuits arranged in a container in a similar fashion to a cobblestone pavement

Pavê (Portuguese pronunciation: [pa've]) is a traditional Brazilian dessert mainly from south and southeast regions that consists of alternating layers of biscuits (ladyfingers or corn starch biscuits) and a cream made using condensed milk. It is similar in structure to the tiramisu.

Generally, recipes involve heating condensed milk and milk, and stirring the mixture until it thickens. Then, layers of milk-soaked biscuits are placed into a container alternating with layers of the creamy mixture. Additionally, pavês can be made of many different flavors, such as chocolate, dulce de leche, peanut, or fruits such as strawberries, pineapples, lemons and peaches.

== Etymology ==
The word pavê is said to have come from the French word pavé, meaning cobblestone pavement. This likely refers to the layout of each of the biscuit layers in the pavê.

== History ==
The origins of pavê are uncertain. However, recipes of pavê can be found as early as 1937. Brazilian recipes of refrigerated dairy desserts consisting of alternating layers of soaked ladyfingers and creamy mixtures can be found as early as 1917, although not called "pavê" at the time, but instead "pudding" or simply "cream".

In the 1970s, a peanut variant of pavê was reportedly popular.

A common pun relating to the dessert (in Brazil, referred to as an uncle joke) is "é pavê ou pacomê?". It is a play on words on the colloquial reduction of "para ver" (meaning 'to look at') to "pa ve", similar in sound to pavê. The joke means, simultaneously, "is [the dessert] to look at, or to eat?" and "is [the dessert] pavê, or to eat?".

== Gallery ==
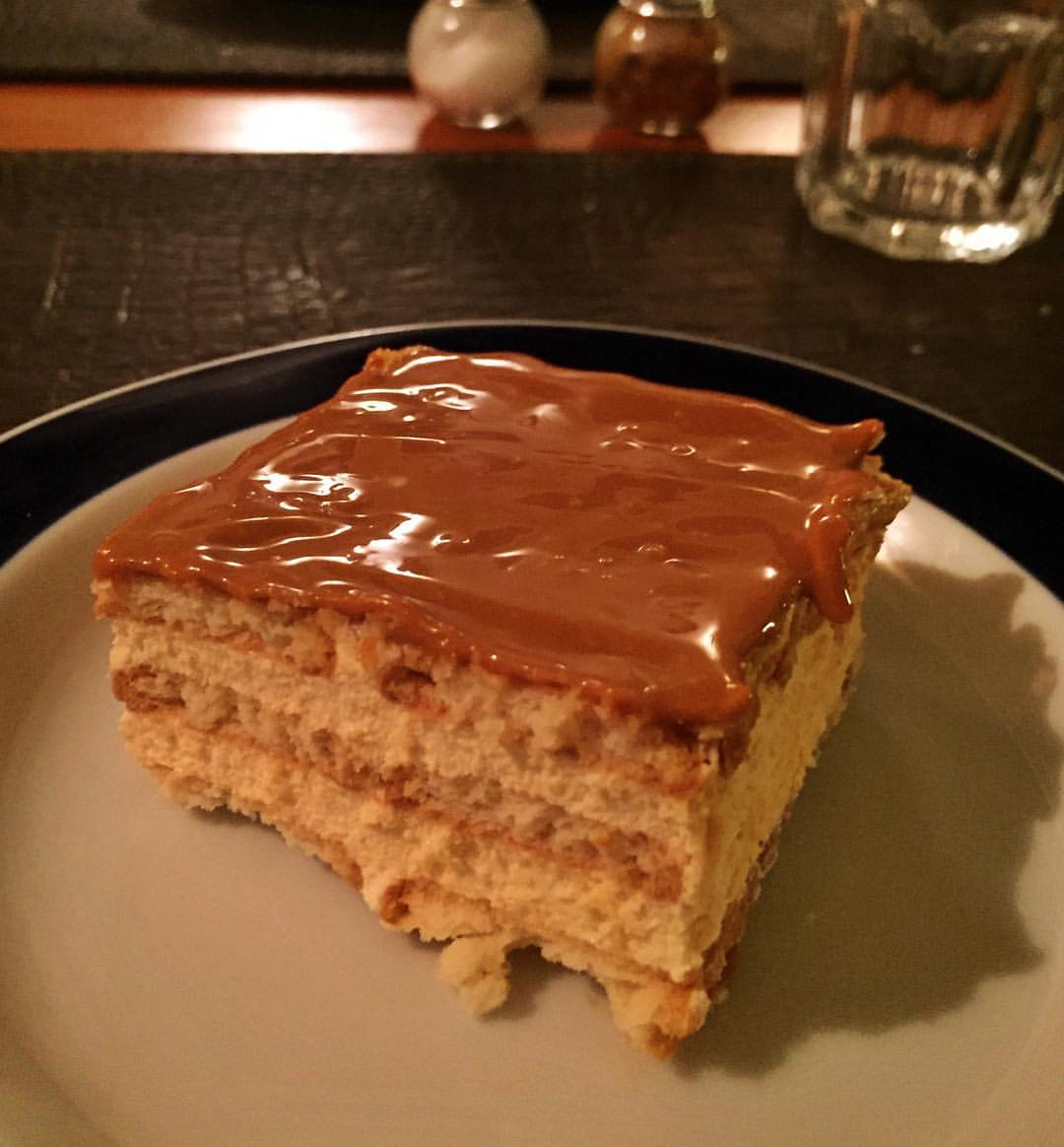
Dulce de leche pavê

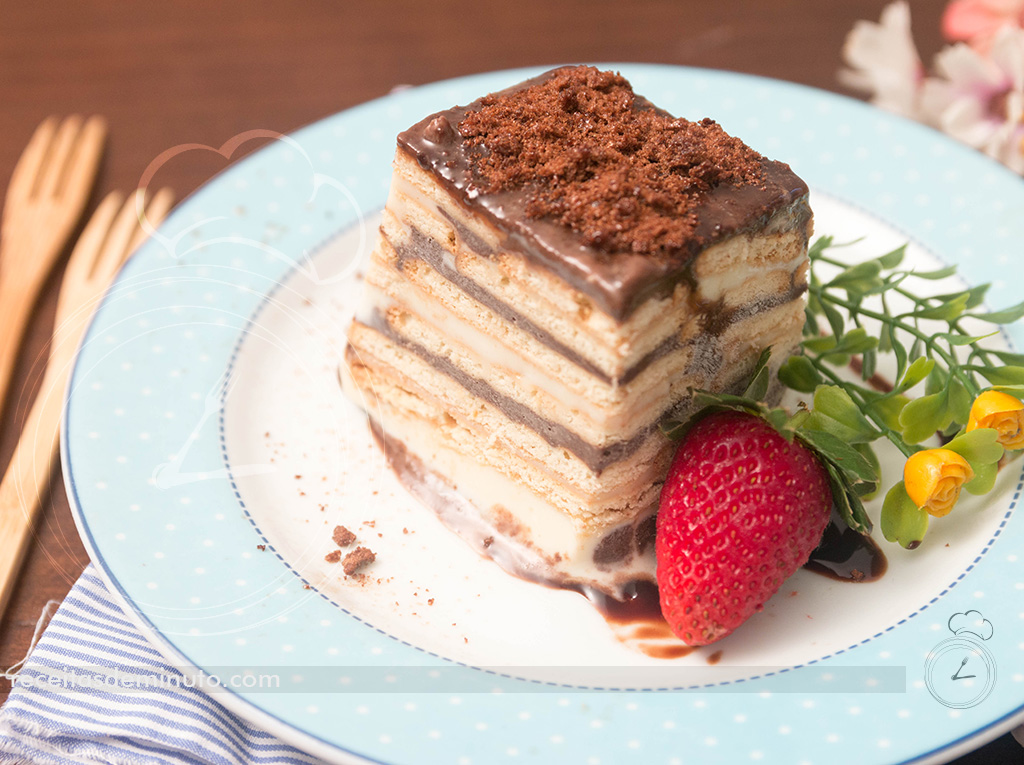
Ovomaltine pavê

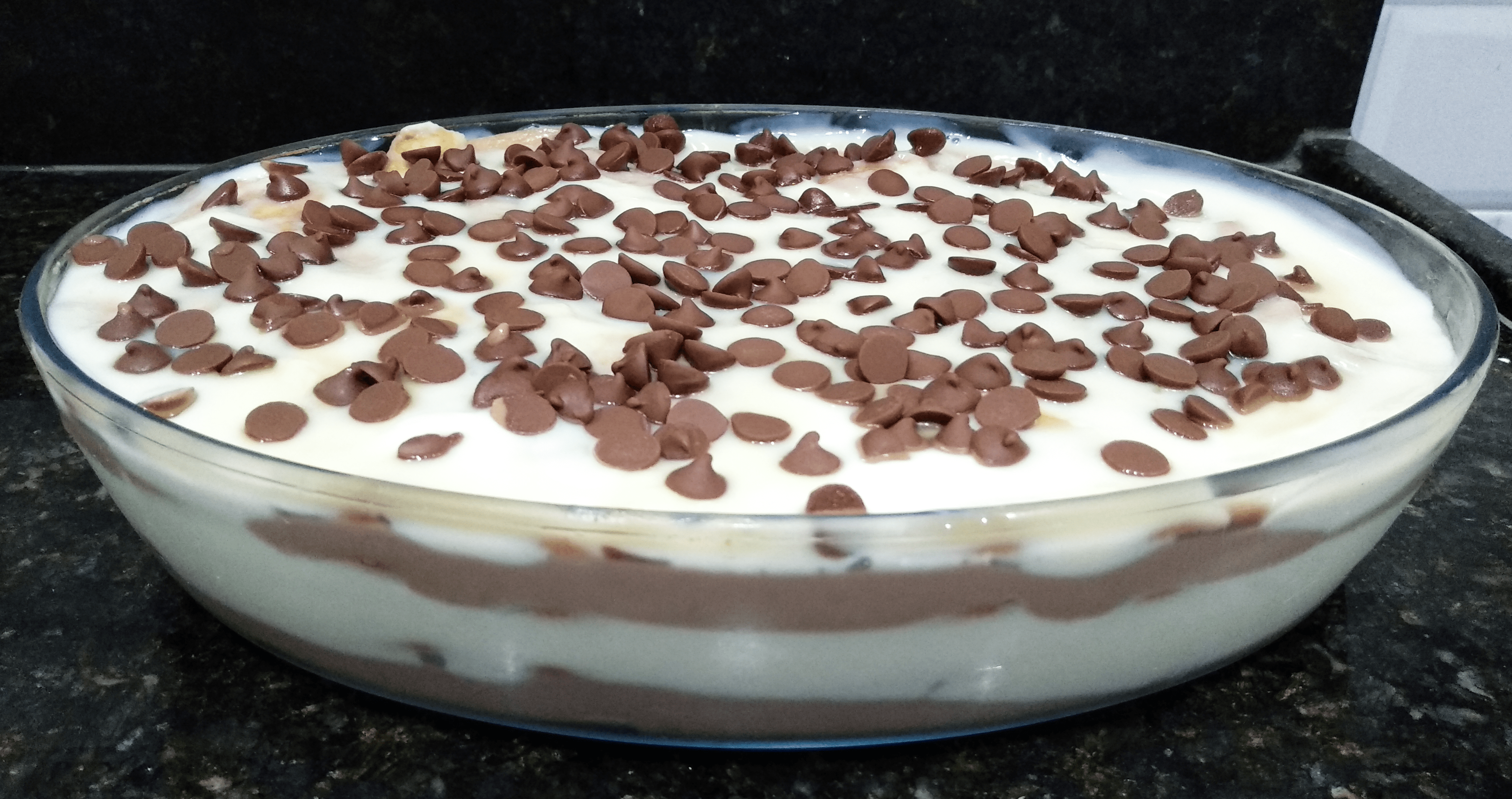
Chocolate pavê

== See also ==
- Tiramisu
- Trifle
- List of Brazilian sweets and desserts
