= Bocadillo (dessert) =

Hispanic American confection made with guava pulp and panela

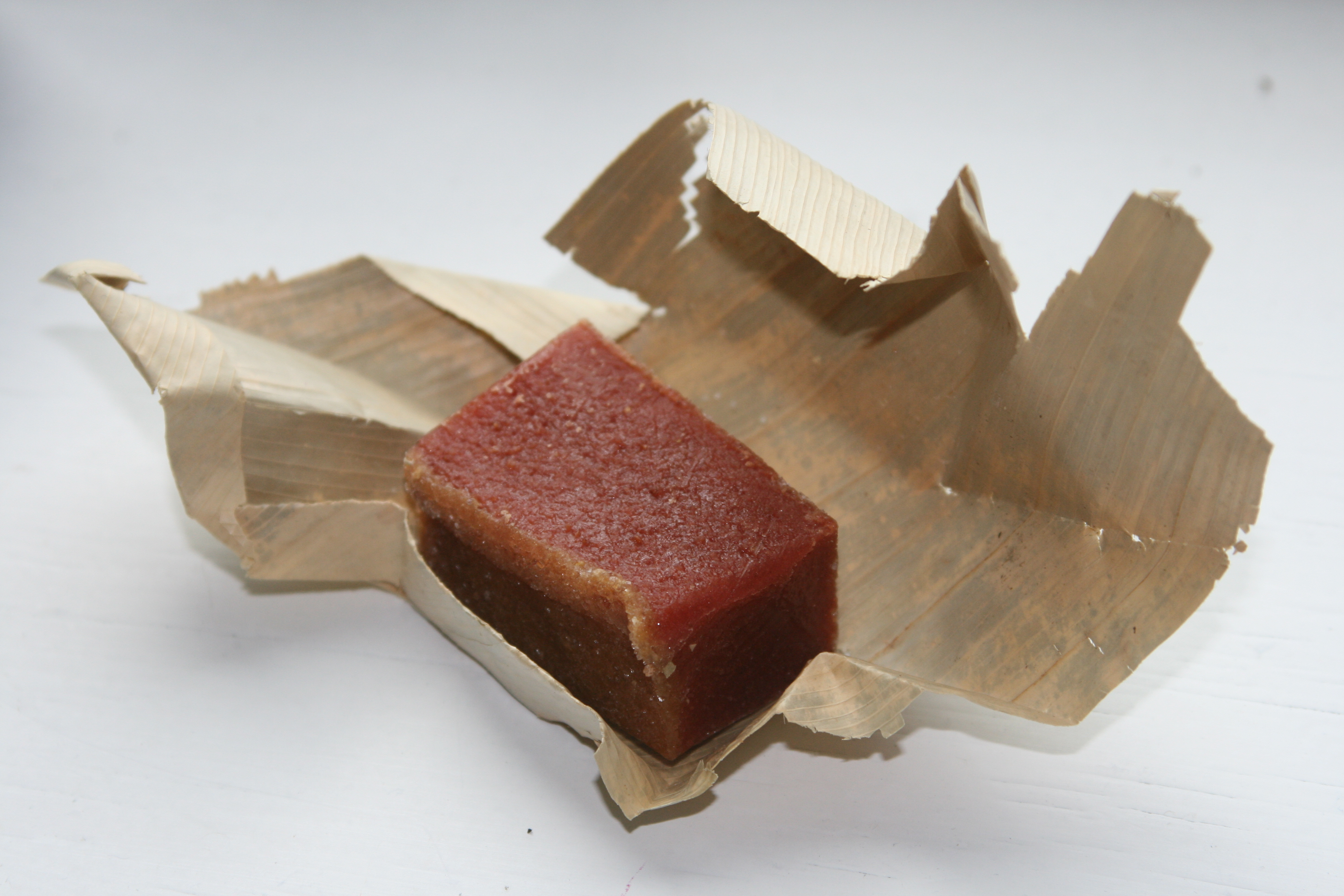
- A block of bocadillo sitting upon its dried bijao leaf packaging.
- Alternative names: Bocadillo de guayaba, guava jelly, guava paste, conserva de guayaba
- Type: Confectionery
- Course: Snack
- Region or state: Latin America
- Main ingredients: Guava pulp and panela

Bocadillo (Spanish: bocadillo (de guayaba), "guava snack"), guava jelly, or guava paste, is a Hispanic American confection made with guava pulp and panela, which is consumed abundantly throughout Colombia, Costa Rica, Ecuador, Panama and Venezuela. Similar confection can be produced from other fruits like banana and coconut.

The town of Vélez, Santander Department, Colombia, is a major centre of production for the sweet and gives it the alternative name "bocadillo veleño". In 2006, the bocadillo veleño was nominated for the cultural symbol for Colombia in the contest organized by a magazine, Semana.

In Venezuela, the form of consumption is similar to that of Colombia, where the product is sometimes called "conserva de guayaba".

Bocadillo is commonly accompanied by cheese, spread upon bread, or simply eaten on its own. It most often takes the form of a small rectangular block, with a firm consistency and a deep red colour, giving it a similar appearance to the related Spanish dessert dulce de membrillo.

Very similar to guava jelly dessert is the closely related Brazilian goiabada, also made from guava but with less sugar.

== Preparation ==
Bocadillo is prepared much like other conserves, jams, and jellies. The guavas are first washed and peeled before being mashed into a pulp, which is strained to remove seeds.

The pulp is then boiled in water along with panela or refined sugar at a low temperature for several hours until the mixture has a thick consistency. The liquid is left to cool off to make it be molded into blocks. It gets its characteristic firm texture once it is fully cooled.

Bocadillo de guayaba is traditionally individually wrapped in the leaves of the bijao (calathea lutea) to preserve it and to enhance its flavour.

== See also ==
- Goiabada
- Quince cheese
- Hawthorn pudding
