= Romeu e Julieta =

Brazilian dessert made of cheese and guava paste

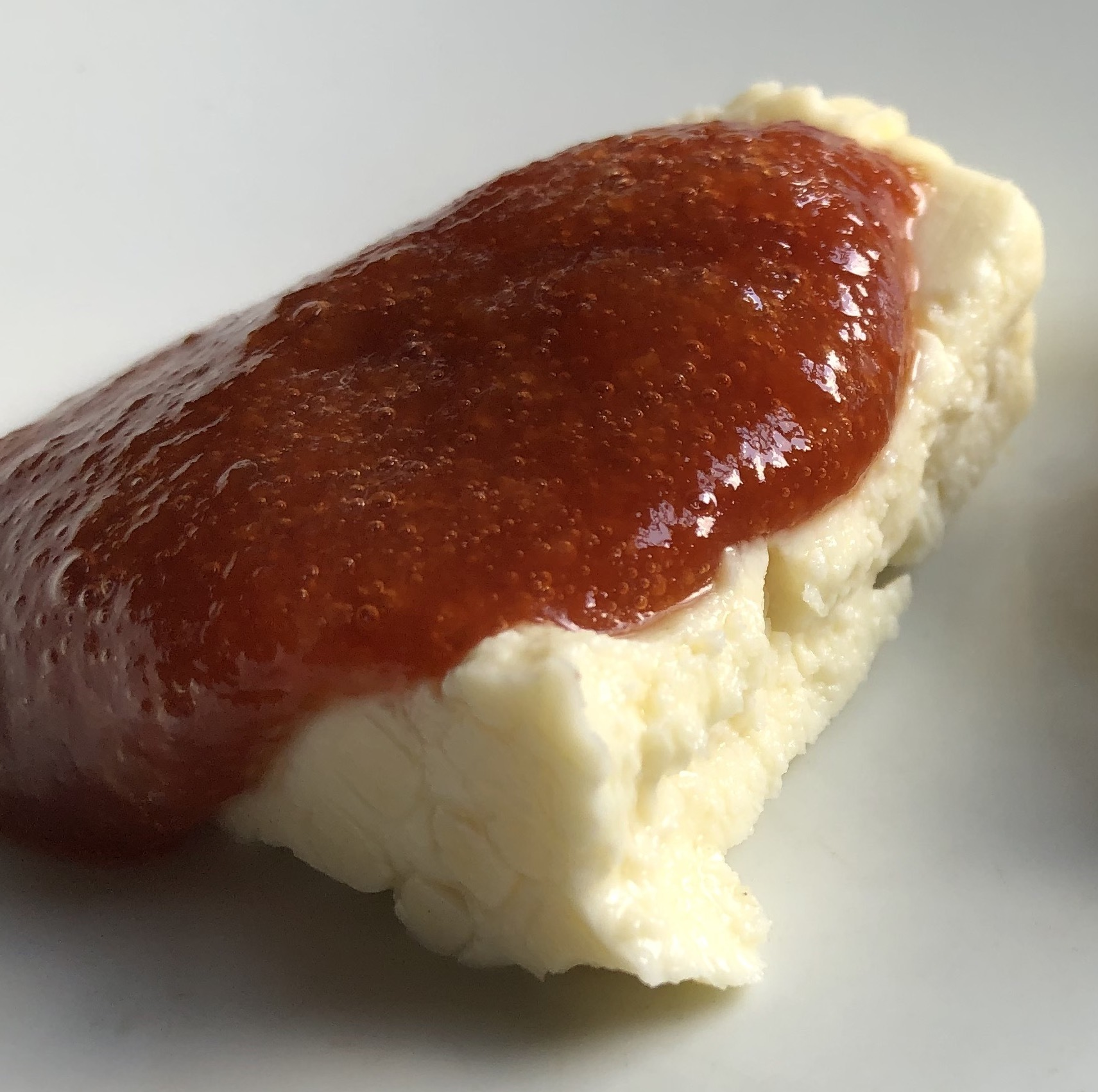
- A traditional Romeu e Julieta
- Course: Dessert
- Place of origin: Brazil
- Region or state: Minas Gerais
- Main ingredients: goiabada (or marmalade) and cheese

Romeu e Julieta (Portuguese: [ʁoˈmew i ʒuliˈetɐ]; lit. 'Romeo and Juliet') is a traditional Brazilian dessert made of cheese and goiabada (or marmalade). While the simplest form of this dessert consists of goiabada over a slice of cheese, desserts and foods can be prepared into Romeu e Julieta versions by incorporating goiabada and cheese into the recipe. The dessert's name is a reference to the title romantic couple of the Shakespearean classic Romeo and Juliet with cheese representing Romeu and goiabada/marmalade representing Julieta.

== History ==
While the exact origin of the dessert is unknown, it is believed to have originated in Minas Gerais during the colonial period when the Portuguese began producing cheese and invented goiabada as an alternative to marmalade. Alternatively, the creation of the dessert is attributed to the Bulgarians.

The dessert only came to be known as Romeu e Julieta in the 1960s, after an advertisement for Cica-brand goiabada which featured popular Brazilian cartoon characters Cebolinha and Mônica (then the company mascots) wearing costumes resembling Romeo and Juliet.

== Variations ==
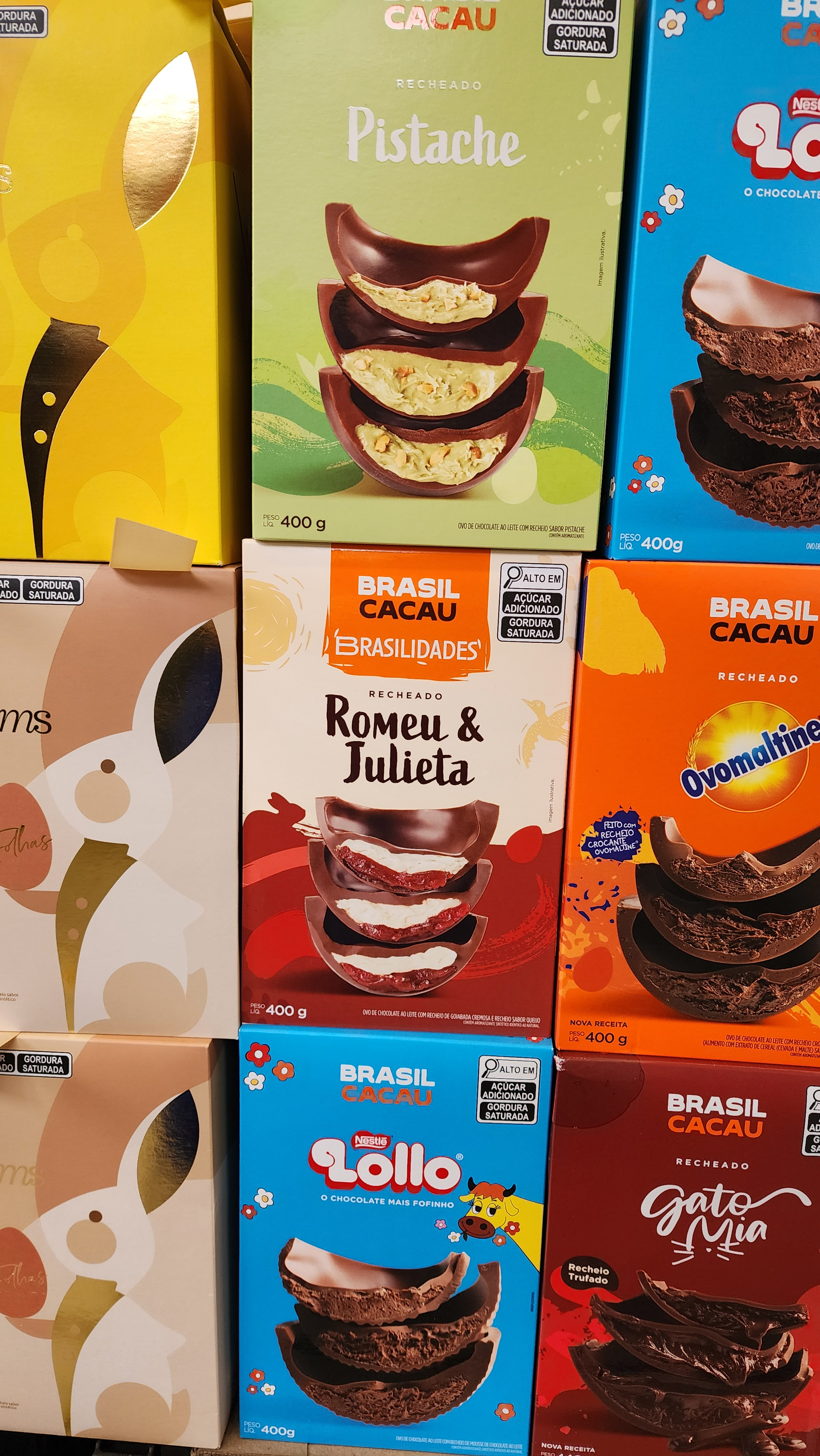
Brazilian Ovo de Páscoa with Romeu e Julieta filling

While the cheese used in Romeu e Julieta is most commonly either minas cheese and canastra cheese, cheddar and parmesan can be used as well.

When not eaten by itself, Romeu e Julieta can be found incorporated in various desserts like cake, cheesecake, soufflé, pavê, mousse, ice cream cake, and ice cream. It can also be eaten as part of a pão de queijo "sandwich".
