= Canastra cheese =

Brazilian cheese

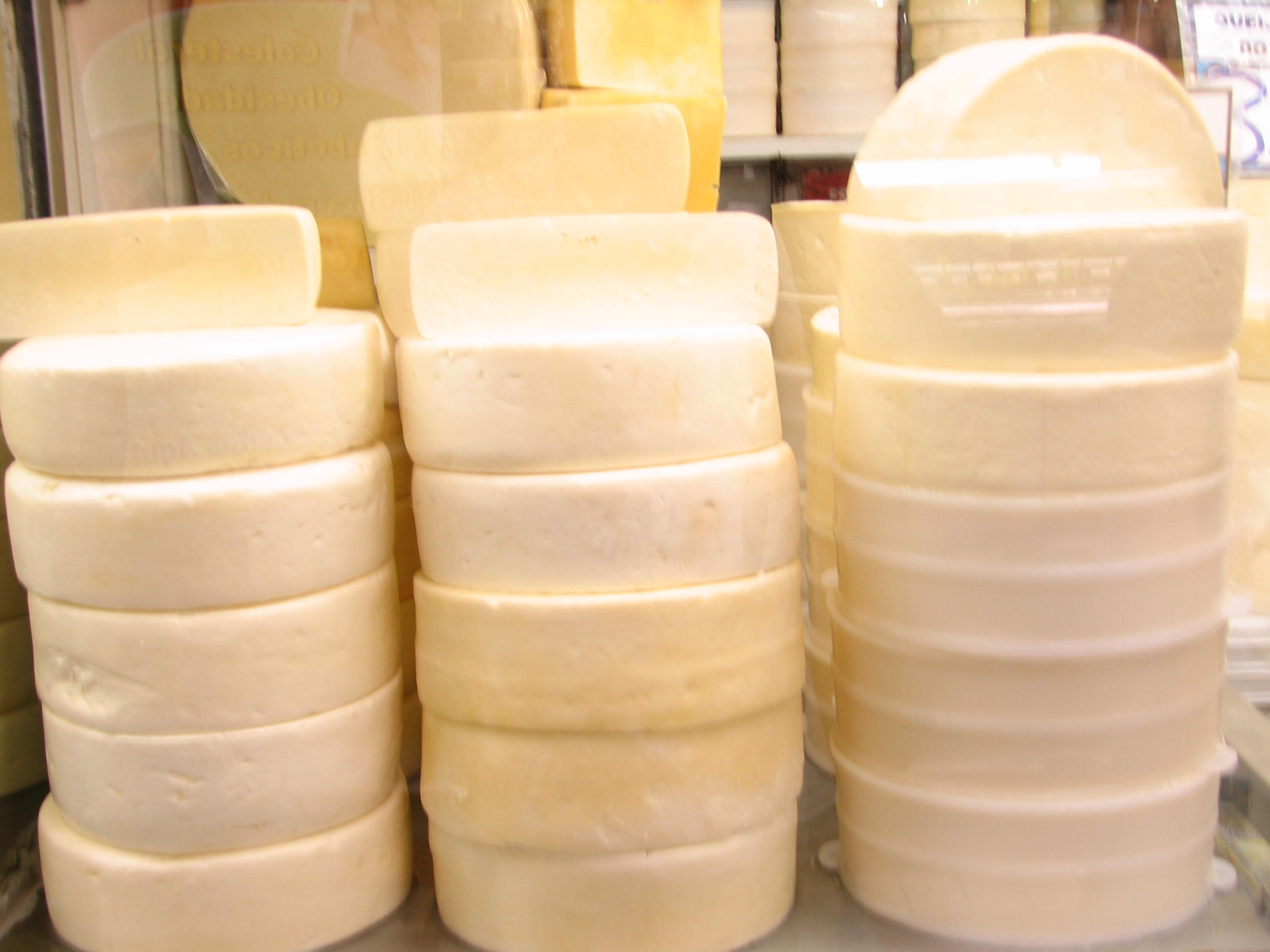
Canastra from Minas Gerais

Canastra is a type of cheese from Brazil. Its name comes from the region where it is produced, a highland known as Serra da Canastra, located in the southwest region of the Minas Gerais state. The climate, altitude, pasture and water of this area are specific for its manufacturing and for this reason this delicacy is only made in a handful of towns, under supervised production. In 2008 the Canastra cheese was deemed to be part of the intangible cultural heritage of Brazil.

== Characteristics ==
The Canastra cheese is made out of raw cow's milk and has a mildly spicy, full-bodied flavour. It is found under three types of maturation: fresh, half and fully cured. The fresh stage means a four-day period and the fully cured forty days.

== See also ==
- List of cheeses
