= Goiabada =

Brazilian dessert, made from guavas

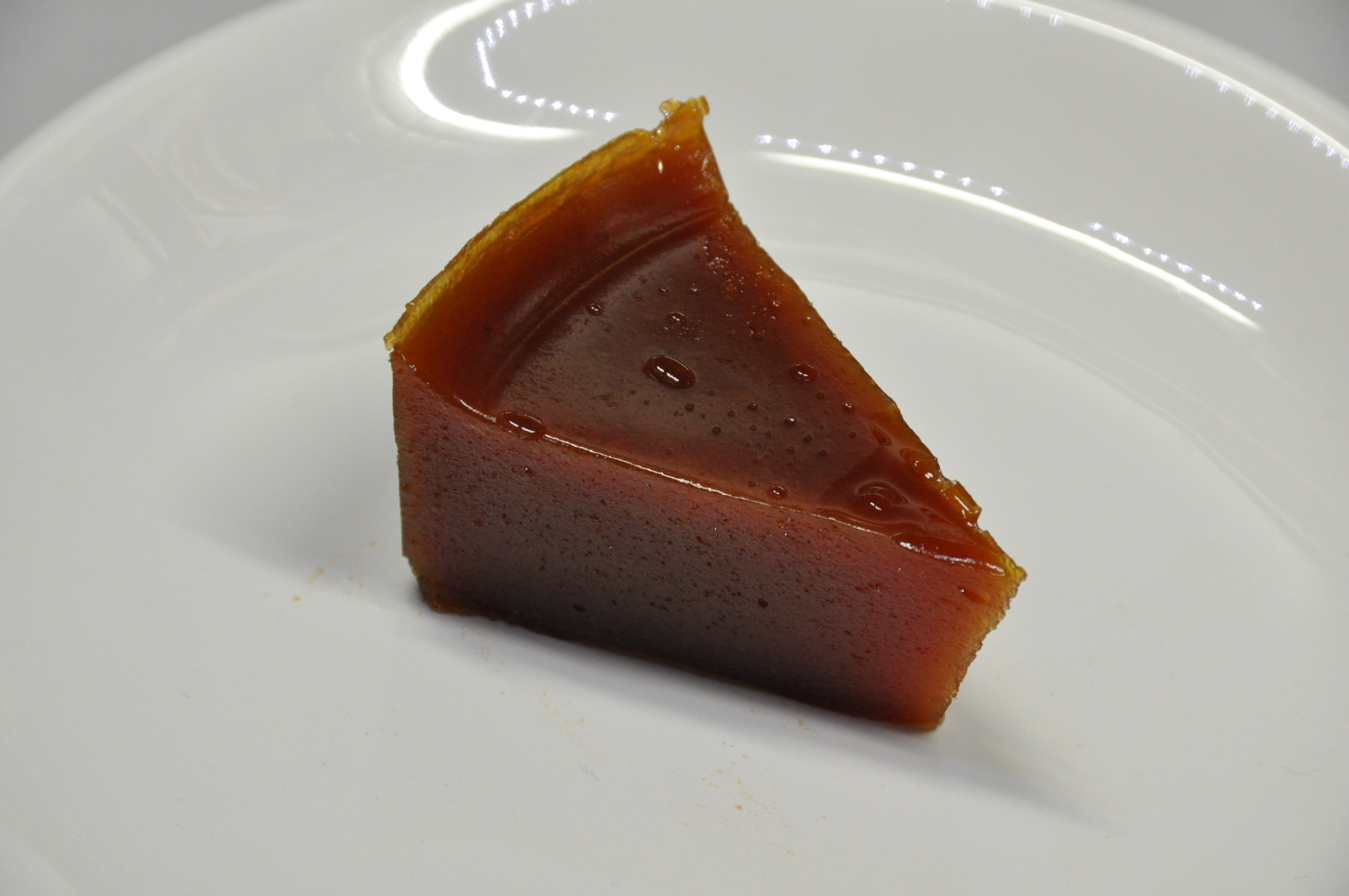
- Commercially produced goiabada
- Alternative names: Guava paste, guava cheese
- Type: Jam
- Place of origin: Brazil
- Region or state: Americas, Goa
- Main ingredients: Guava, sugar, water

Goiabada ([goja'badɐ]; from Portuguese goiaba, guava) is a conserve made of red guavas and sugar, commonly found throughout the Portuguese-speaking countries of the world. It dates back to the colonial times of Brazil, where guavas were used as a substitute for the quinces used to make quince cheese. It required an abundance of sugar and slave labor for its production as it was made in large batches within cauldrons cooking over a slow fire. In rural areas of Brazil, it is still commonly made at home for family use or sale.

== Variations ==
Very similar to goiabada is the closely related Colombian bocadillo, also made from guava but with more sugar.

It is known as guava paste or guava cheese throughout the English-speaking Americas, especially the Caribbean, and dulce de guayaba, barra de guayaba, pasta de guayaba, bocadillo or guayabate in Spanish-speaking Americas. It is commercially available, most often packaged in flat metal cans, or as long rectangular blocks in chipboard boxes.

It is called perad in Goa (India), a former Portuguese colony. It is typically prepared seasonally after the guava harvest and cut into diamond-shaped pieces. Perad is an important component of the Christmas kuswar platter, symbolising festive hospitality and collective household labour. The dish reflects Portuguese culinary influence and is usually made in small batches at home rather than mass-produced.

In Brazil, goiabada is often eaten with Minas cheese in a dessert known as Romeu e Julieta. It is also popular spread on toast at breakfast.

In Portugal, it is used as the filling of the popular bolo de rosas (rose cake) in which a layer of pastry is covered with goiabada, then rolled and cut into pieces that resemble roses. This same cake is called rocambole in Brazil, and also uses a layer of pastry covered with goiabada, then rolled and served, as a Swiss roll. Another popular dessert is the bolo de rolo.

Goiabada may come in many widely different possible textures, ranging from a thin paste, meant to be eaten with a spoon or spread on bread or cakes, to very hard slabs that can be sliced with a knife only with some difficulty. Canned varieties are usually half-way between those extremes, being easily cut into soft slices. The many different kinds of goiabada depend on the type of guava, the proportion of sugar, the amount of water, and the cooking process.

== See also ==
- Bocadillo (dessert) – Hispanic American confection made with guava pulp and panela
- Quince cheese, also known as Dulce de membrillo – Fruit jelly confection
- List of Brazilian sweets and desserts
- Lekvar – Sweet fruit spread
