= Pizza in Brazil =

Pizza is a popular food in Brazil, and the country's choice of toppings are internationally renowned for being very unconventional.

== History ==
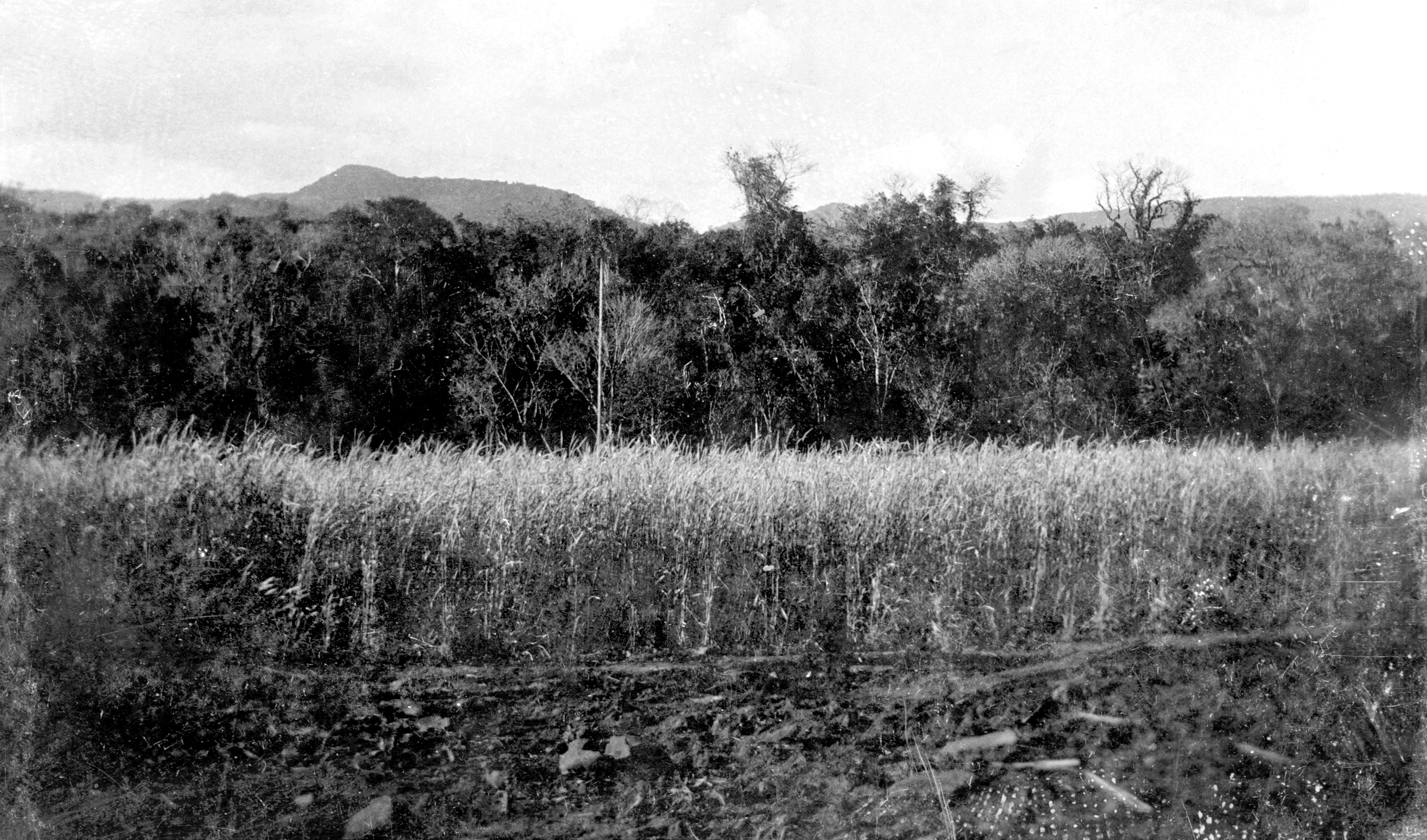
Wheat field in Rio Grande do Sul, c. 1898

Wheat only started being grown in reasonable quantities in Brazil in the latter part of the 18th century. Even then, its production was aimed at supplying the viceregal government and the upper class, so common folk did not have easy access to it. Instead, baking was done mostly using mandioca or maize flour.

In 1808, along with the Portuguese court came the first bakers by trade. Brazil's wheat production, suffering from a rust that cut harvest yield by half, was insufficient for the population that had arrived. In order to supply demand, wheat began to be imported from the United States and Russia soon afterwards.

This coincided with developments in the abolition of slavery in Brazil, which caused landowners to increasingly look to immigrants as a source of cheap labor to replace slaves. The largest share of those immigrants were Italian in origin. (Note: Though some migrated before the unification of Italy.) With many Italian Brazilians in the country and easy access to wheat, conditions were ideal for the emergence of pizza.

Pizza was sold as a street food in Brazil since at least the late 19th century. Sellers would bake pizzas at home, then carry them on the streets in portable metal barrels fitted with burning coal at the bottom to keep them warm.

The first known Brazilian pizzeria was Carmino Corvino's Santa Genoveva, a cantina which opened in 1910 in the Brás district in the city of São Paulo. It offered pizzas in four flavors: mozzarella, napolitana, alice and mezzo a mezzo (half alici, half mozzarella).

== In Brazilian society ==
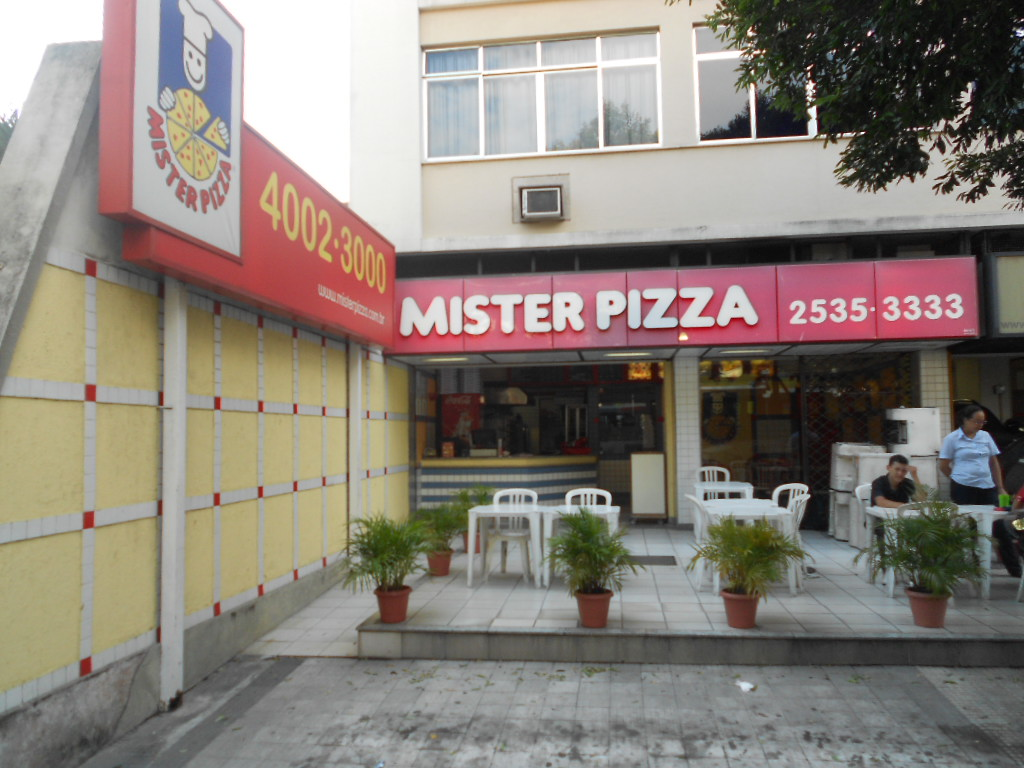
Brazilian pizzeria chain Mister Pizza, in Rio de Janeiro

The United Pizzerias Association of Brazil (Associação Pizzarias Unidas do Brasil, APUBRA) annually publishes a study on pizzerias in the country. Their count, with data up to December 2020, puts the number of pizzerias in the country at 83,291. Though, due to the nature of the data made available by the government, the organization estimates their study covers only about 75% of the actual pizzerias in Brazil, so there should be around 110 thousand in reality. With about 41% of the country's population, the Southeast Region has the largest share of the country's pizzerias, with over 50%:

Population share vs. pizzeria distribution by Region
Region	Population share (2022)	Pizzeria distribution (2020)	Pizzeria distribution (2023)	Average pizza consumption per capita (g/day) (2018)
North	8.5%	5%	4%	3.7
Northeast	26.9%	19%	16%	4.3
Center-west	8.0%	8%	8%	7.4
Southeast	41.8%	54%	52%	8.0
South	14.7%	14%	20%	7.7
Total	100%	100%	100%	6.5

In per capita kilograms of pizza consumed per year, Brazil's average sits at 6.5 × 365 = 2.37 kg/year.

Between the years of 1962 and 2007, a span of 45 years, Brazil saw around 10 thousand pizzerias open in the country. In contrast, in the 12 years between 2008 and 2020, over 73 thousand new pizzerias opened. In a 2018 report, the production of pizzas in Brazil was estimated at 1 million a day, with São Paulo accounting for about 572 thousand; by 2023, that number had spiked to 3.8 million and 870 thousand, respectively.

Pizza is consumed habitually across socioeconomic groups in Brazil. In a 2003 study, groups from upper-middle, middle and lower-middle class all reported a pizza consumption of, on average, once every two weeks; this is contrast to, for example, chocolate, which was, on average, 10 times more frequent in the upper-middle class' consumption compared to the lower-middle class'. In a study by the Brazilian Institute of Geography and Statistics (IBGE) to measure food consumption in Brazil in 2017–2018, researchers split the population between four income strata. The average pizza consumption per capita was 1.8, 4.9, 9.0 and 12.5 grams per day, from lowest to highest income, respectively.

Additionally, pizza is seemingly mostly an urban commodity. In the IBGE study for 2017–2018, the average pizza consumption per capita in rural areas was 1.4 grams per day, in contrast to the 7.4 grams per day in urban areas.

=== Cultural aspects ===
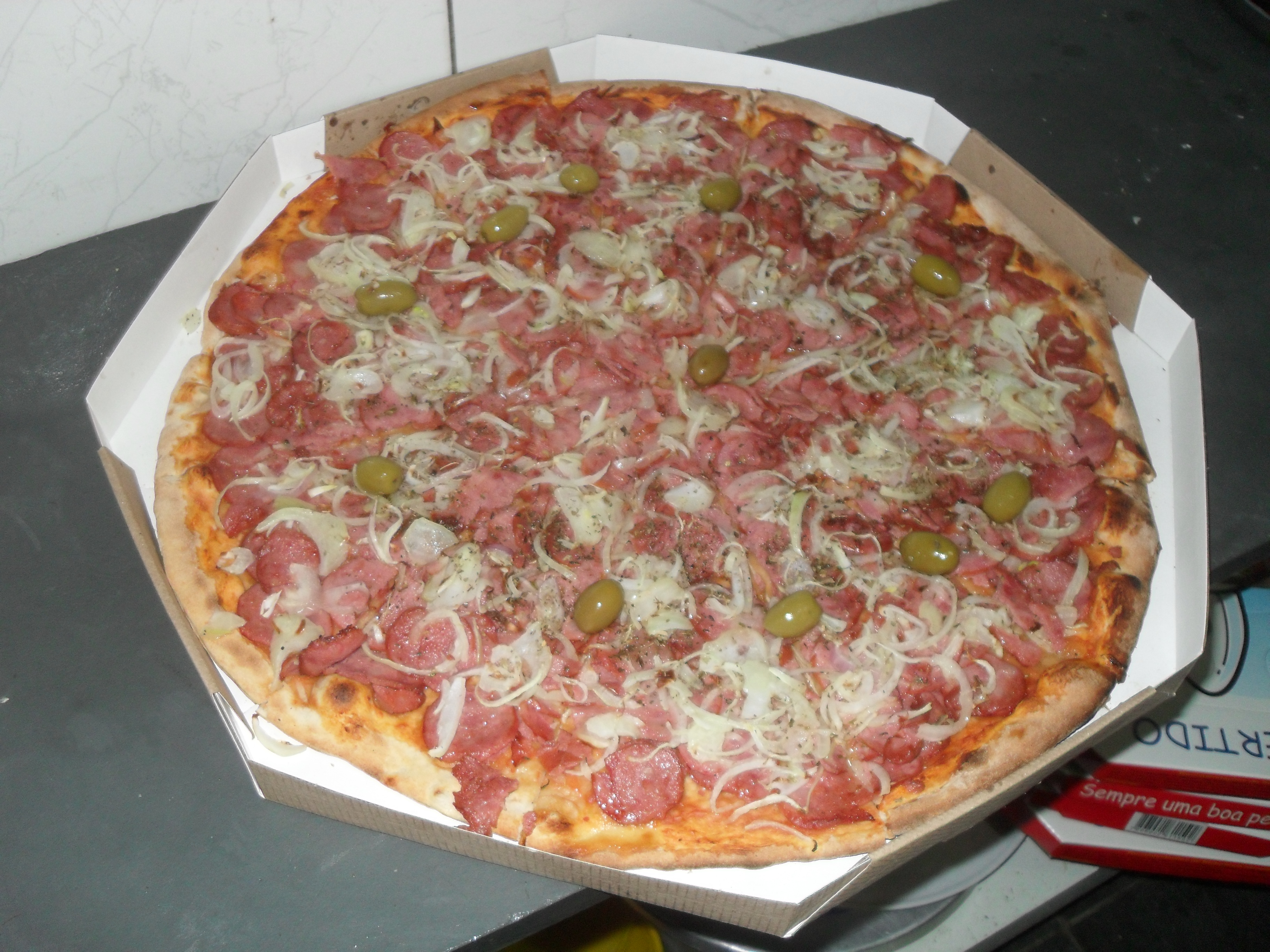
A linguiça calabresa, onions and olives pizza, filled to the brim with toppings, from Guarujá, São Paulo

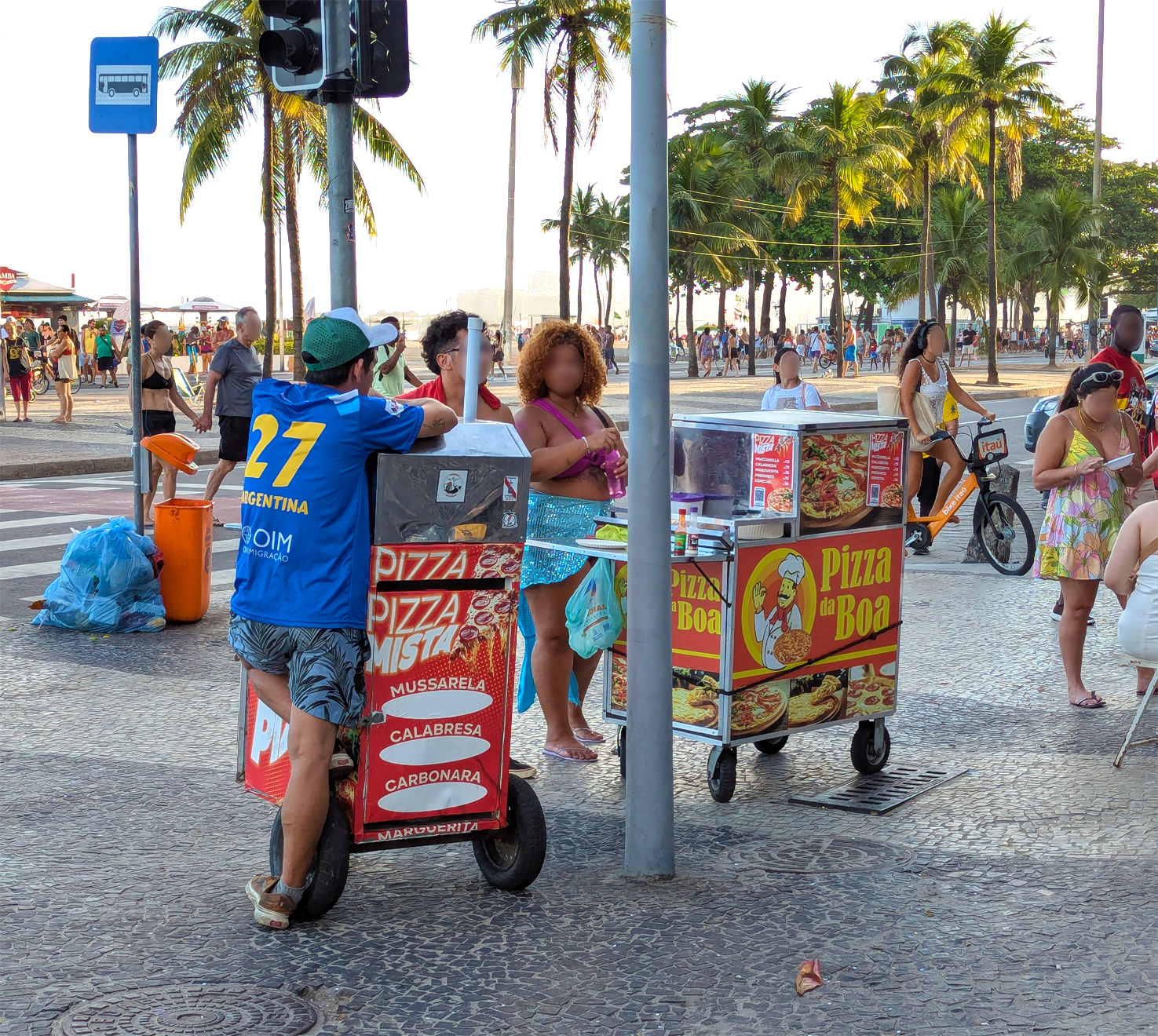
Street food vendors selling pizzas at Copacabana Beach, Rio de Janeiro

In Brazil, pizza is often consumed using cutlery, as opposed to with one's hands. Travel writer Carla Vianna justifies this cultural quirk by pointing at the kinds and quantities of pizza toppings in Brazil: the only way to eat a "pizza portuguesa" (lit. 'Portuguese pizza') – a combo of cheese, hard-boiled eggs, onions, peas and ham – without it falling apart is by using utensils. Additionally, as Milk Street writer J. M. Hirsch puts it, in Brazil, pizza is "a fine dining, Sunday family dinner situation"; "sit down, not carry out". With those factors combined, fork and knife are usually a social expectation, as well as, pragmatically, a necessity. Nevertheless, pizza is also sold as a street food in Brazil, often as a snack for beachgoers.

Pizzas are often ordered for a group of people to share, as opposed to each person eating separately. As such, a common option is ordering meio a meio ("half and half"): pizzas in which half the toppings are of one kind, and half are another. The halves are usually either both savory or both sweet, though not necessarily. Furthermore, some restaurants offer to cut the pizza into small squares or rhombuses instead of the traditional triangular slices. In Brazil, this is known as the [corte] à francesa ("French-style [cut]"), which internationally is referred to as the "Chicago cut", "party cut" or "tavern cut".

Throughout Brazil, condiments such as ketchup, mustard, mayonnaise and olive oil are customarily added to pizza.

=== Rodízios ===
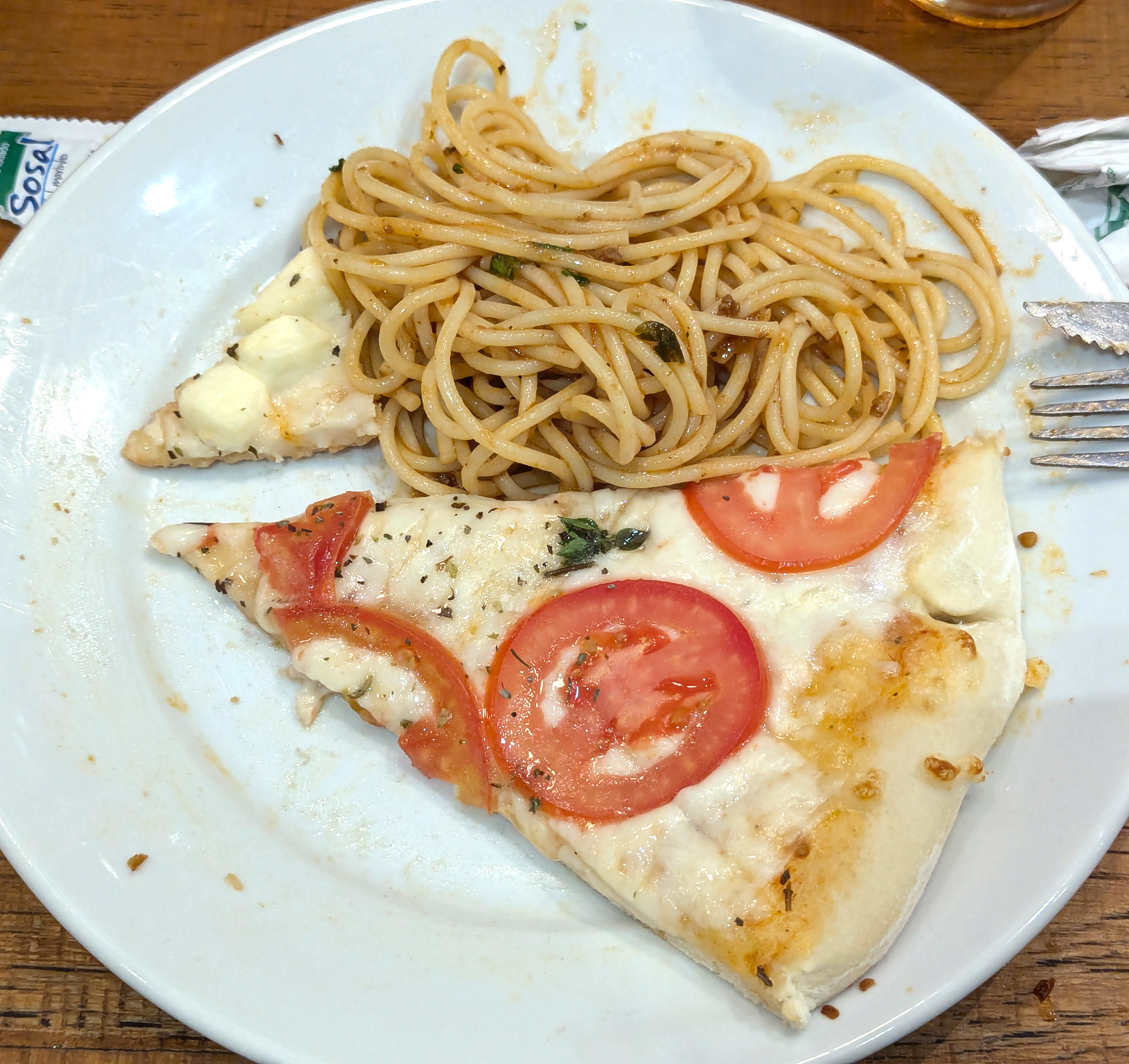
Plate at a pasta rodízio restaurant, a slice of pizza with a side of spaghetti, resembling Canadian pizza-ghetti

A common way to dine pizza in Brazil is at a rodízio restaurant. Such establishments are all-you-can-eat style, in which slices of pizza are served continuously by waiters and patrons decide which slices they wish to eat, and when to stop.

In these settings, uncommon flavors are more customary. One can find pizzas with toppings such as french fries, chicken or beef stroganoff, hamburger patties with cheddar cheese and even Fettuccine Alfredo.

== Varieties ==
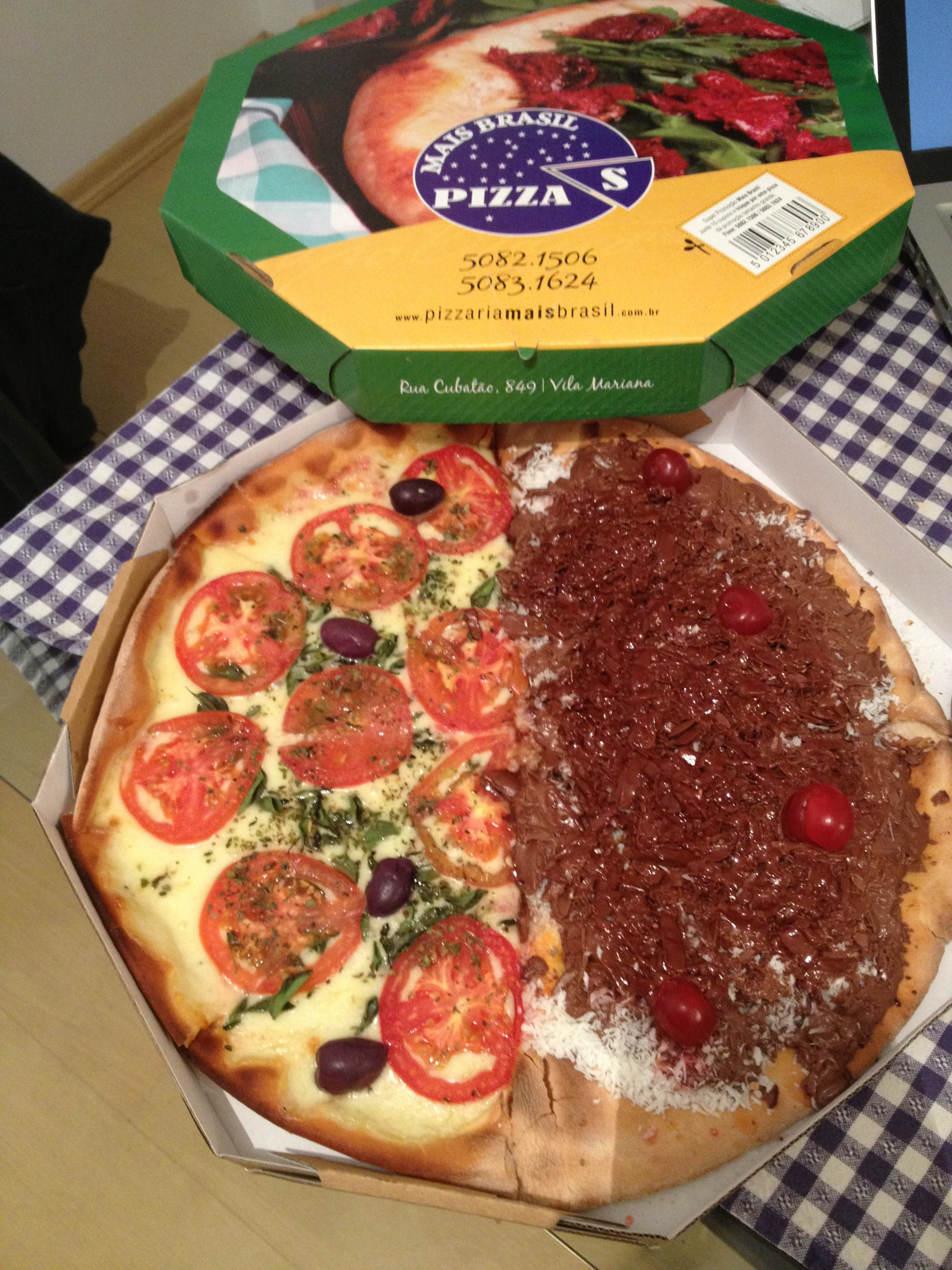
An unusual order of half savory (tomatoes, olives), half sweet (prestígio: chocolate with coconut) pizza

Brazilian pizzas are considered "less conservative" than their Italian counterparts, which translates to a greater variety of toppings. As columnist Dias Lopes puts it, "in Brazil, there is no standard" for toppings when restaurants come up with them. Travel blogger Diego Ortiz states "virtually anything can go on pizza" in Brazil.

Due to the liberal amount of toppings, pizza in Brazil is also cooked at lower temperatures and at a slower pace than their Italian counterparts; Milk Street writer J. M. Hirsch describes "a relatively tepid 330 °C (626 °F) for roughly 2½ minutes", in contrast to Naples' 60–90 seconds at 430 °C (806 °F) to 480 °C (896 °F).

=== Savory pizzas ===
Plain mozzarella pizza – tomato sauce, mozzarella cheese and dried oregano leaves – is one of the most ordered pizza varieties in Brazil, behind only pizza calabresa, which are topped with linguiça calabresa (or "Calabrian sausage"). The plain mozzarella pizza, while sold by itself, is also usually considered the base for every savory pizza, with few exceptions.

The pizza portuguesa (lit. 'Portuguese pizza'), invented at some point in the 1950s or 60s, is the third most popular topping of choice in Brazil. It's usually ham, sliced onions, hard-boiled eggs and olives on top of the usual tomato sauce and mozzarella base. However, depending on the restaurant, it may also include peas, calabresa sausage, bell peppers, hearts of palm, portobello mushrooms (known as "champignon" in Brazil) and even cooked corn, while still being referred to as a Portuguese pizza.

Another very popular topping in Brazil is frango com requeijão ("chicken with requeijão"), known also with the brand name, frango com catupiry ("chicken with Catupiry"), a simple shredded chicken pizza with requeijão streaks. It is rumored to have been created in the 1970s when a representative of the Catupiry brand suggested its use in a pizza.

Requeijão has been widely used with toppings other than chicken, such as ham or pepperoni – the latter making what is sometimes called a catuperoni (Catupiry + pepperoni) pizza.

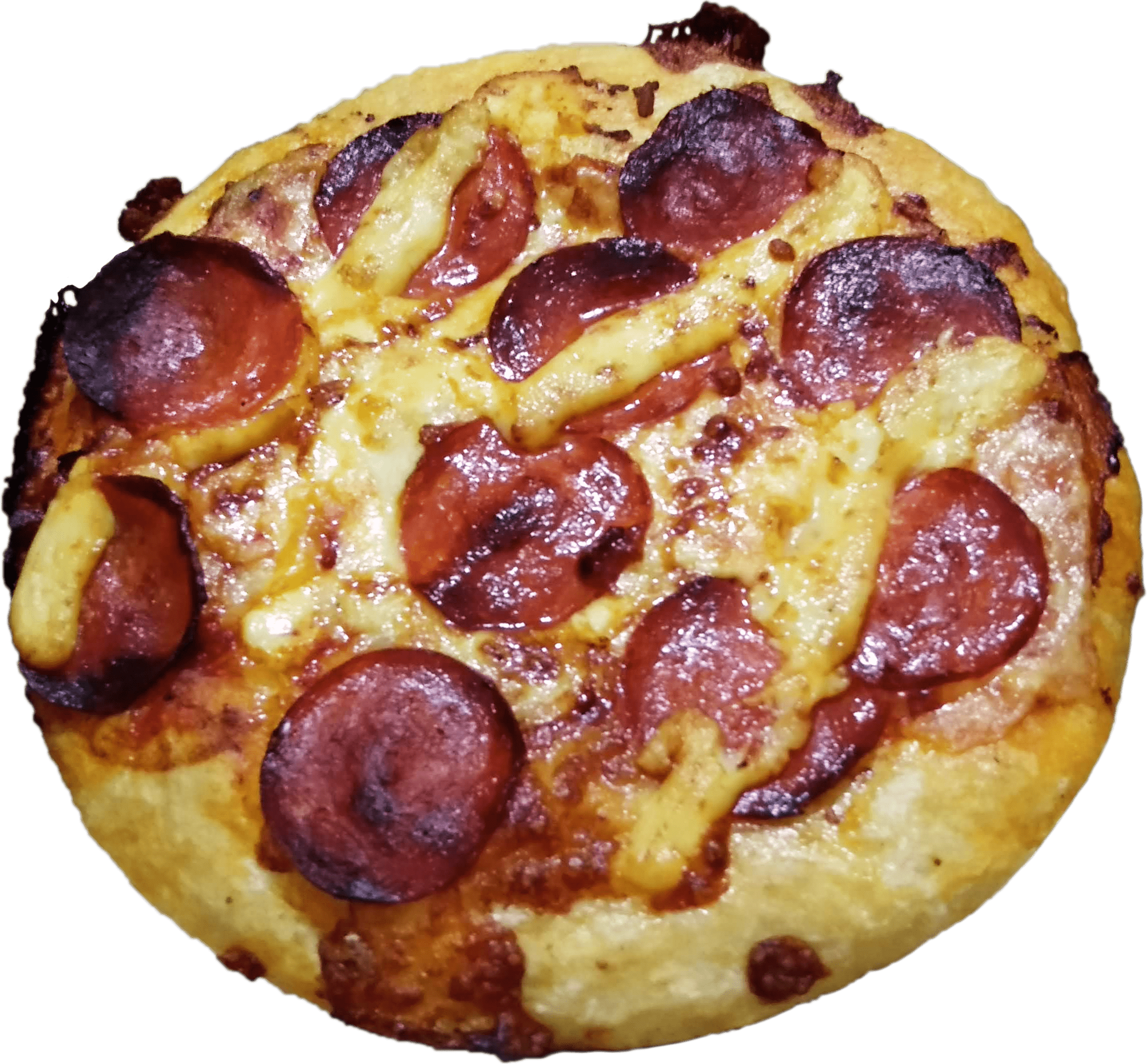
Catuperoni pizza from a Pizza Hut in Brazil

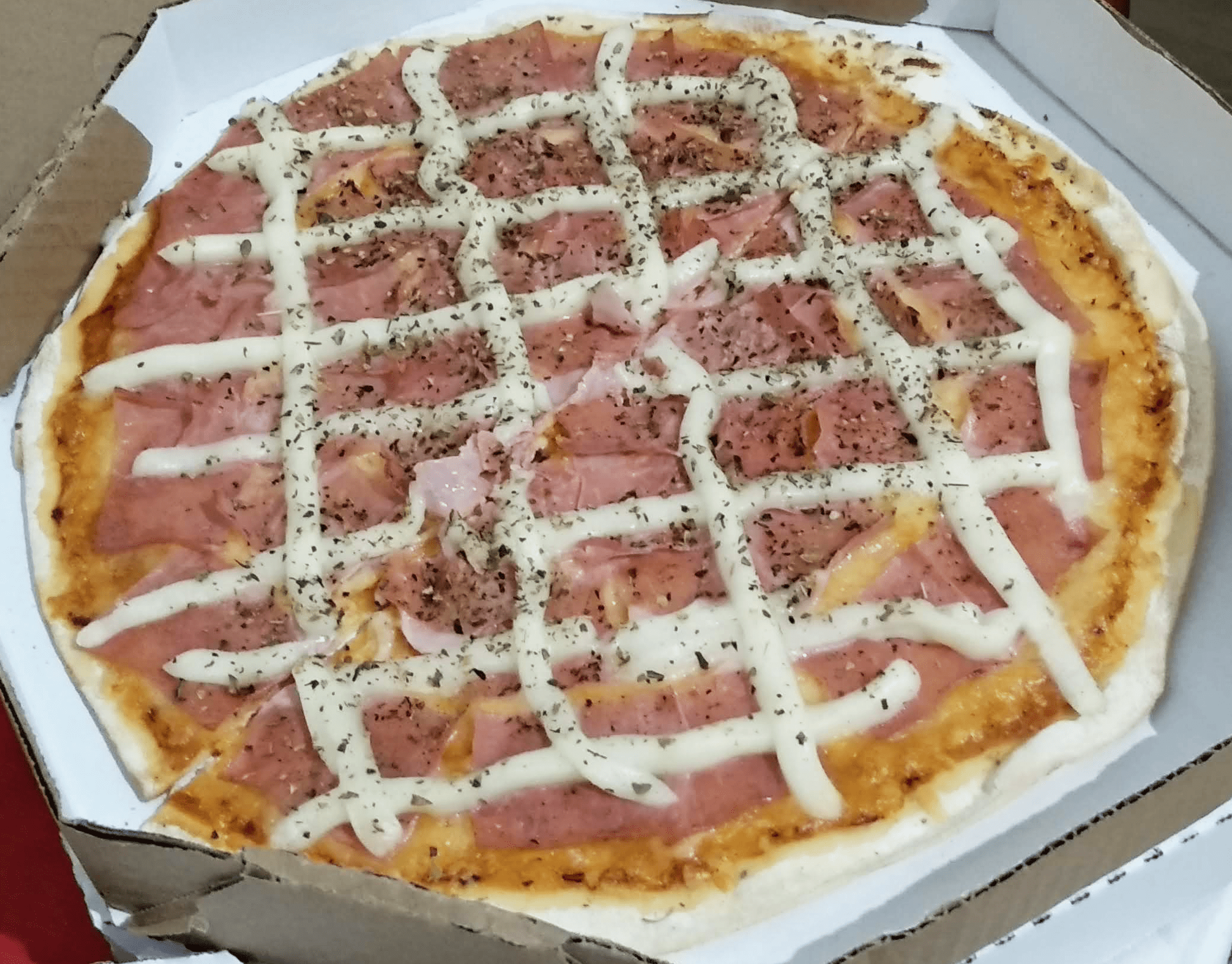
Ham and requeijão pizza

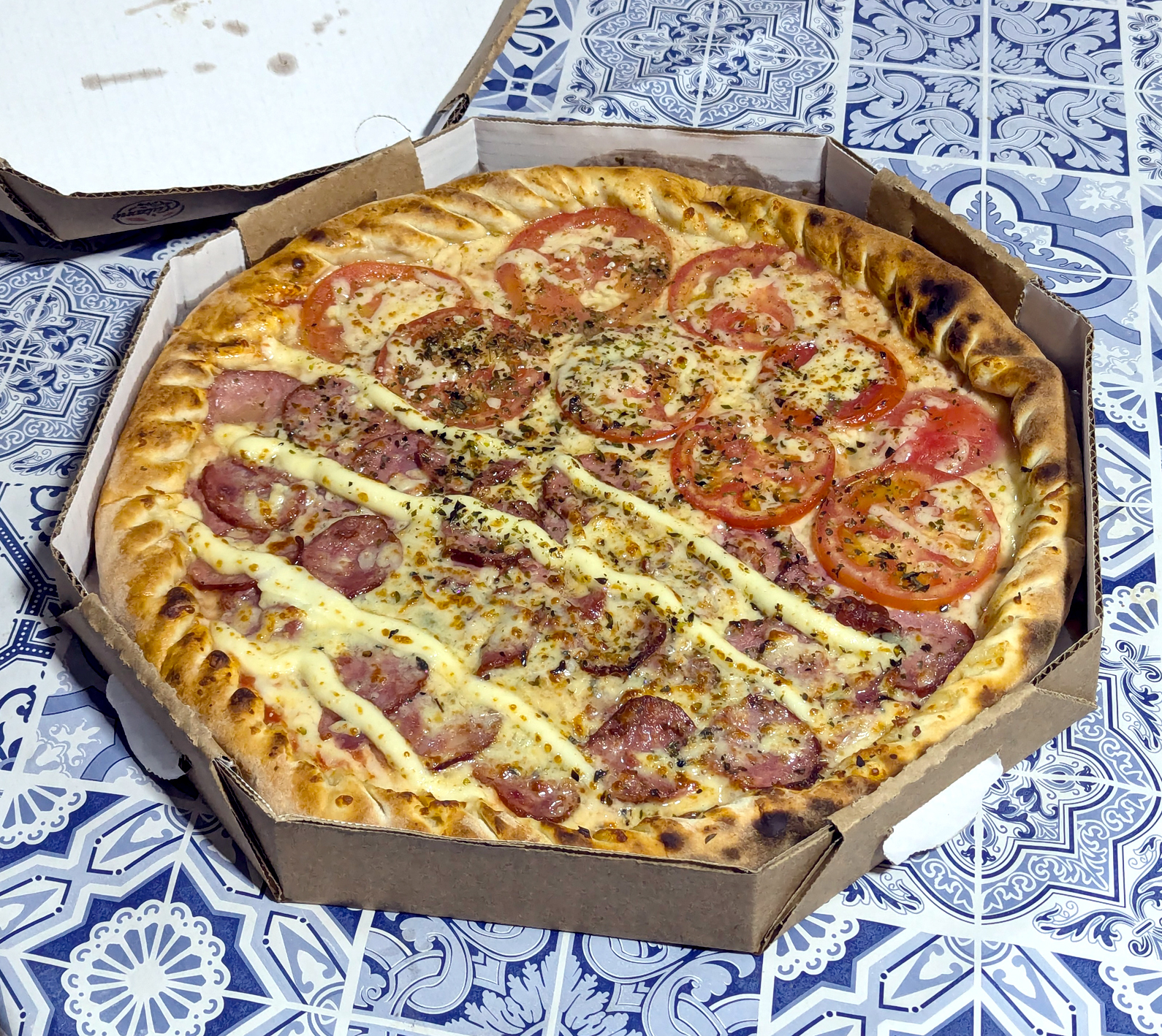
Half calabresa com catupiry, half napolitana (tomatoes with parmesan) pizza with a stuffed soft crust

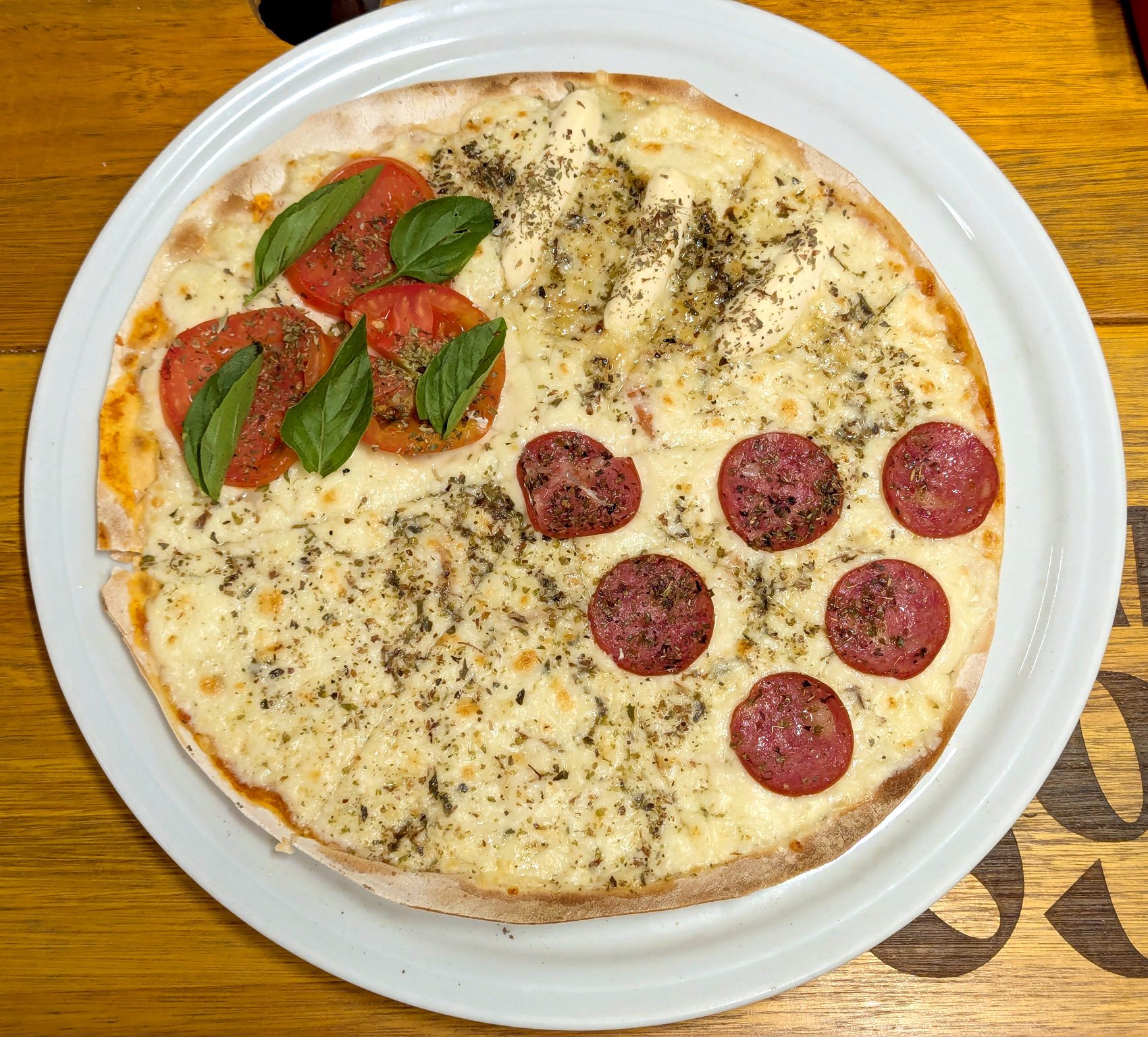
Unusual four-flavored pizza ("four seasons") served at a supermarket in Rio de Janeiro

==== Calabresa pizzas in São Paulo ====
São Paulo differs from the rest of the country when it comes to pizza calabresa (with "calabresa sausage"): paulistas, those who live in the city, believe a true pizza calabresa should not contain cheese. The recipe in the city is usually dough, tomato sauce, calabresa and sliced onions. Outside São Paulo, this may be considered strange and surprising, as savory pizzas, regardless of toppings, are expected to start with a base of dough, tomato sauce and mozzarella.

=== Sweet pizzas ===
While controversial to some, sweet pizzas are very common in Brazil. One common topping choice is Romeu e Julieta, a combination of cheese and goiabada (sometimes translated as "guava paste").

Bananas are also a very common sweet pizza topping, sometimes atop mozzarella (though with no tomato sauce), and usually paired with chocolate, dulce de leche, condensed milk or cinnamon and sugar.

Finally, chocolate pizzas are a family on its own. Melted chocolate, be it milk or white chocolate, is spread on the dough as a sort of "sauce". This is then topped with pretty much anything – strawberries, shredded coconut, chocolate sprinkles, M&M's, crushed Kit Kats, brownies and even ice cream scoops.

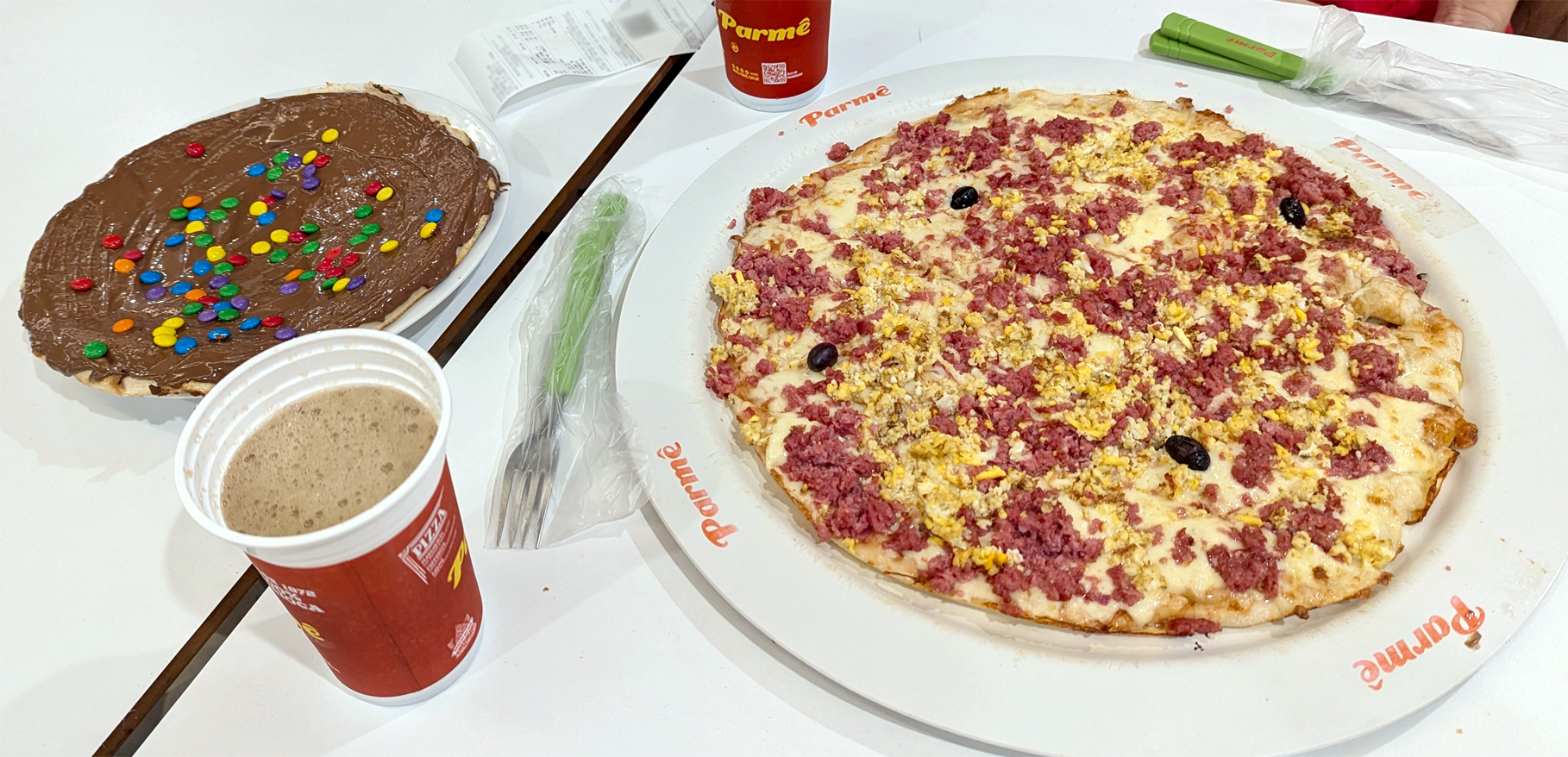
Chocolate spread with M&M-like confections (usually called confetes in Brazil) is a very common sweet topping combination

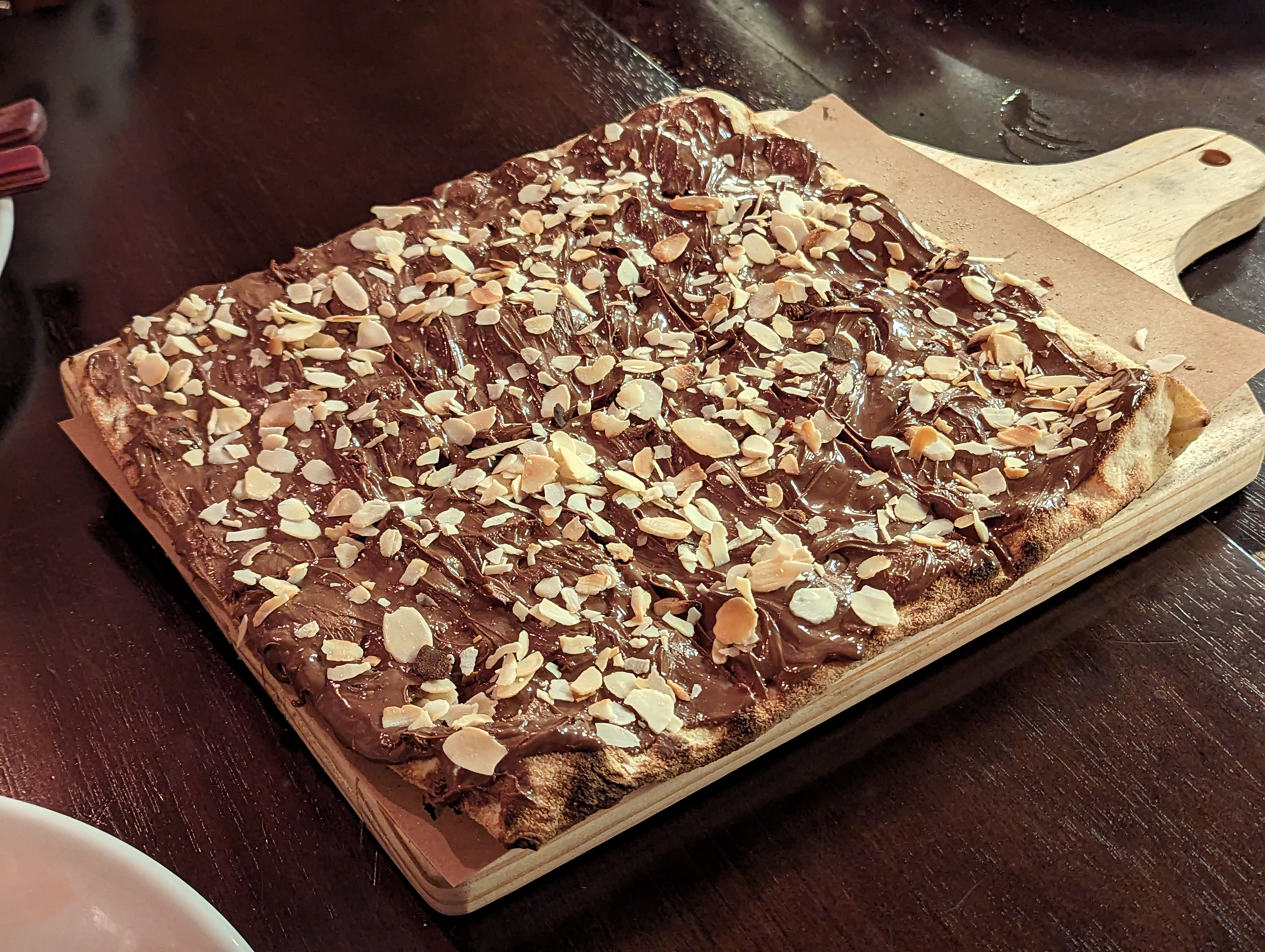
Nutella sprinkled with sliced and toasted almonds on a square pizza in São Paulo

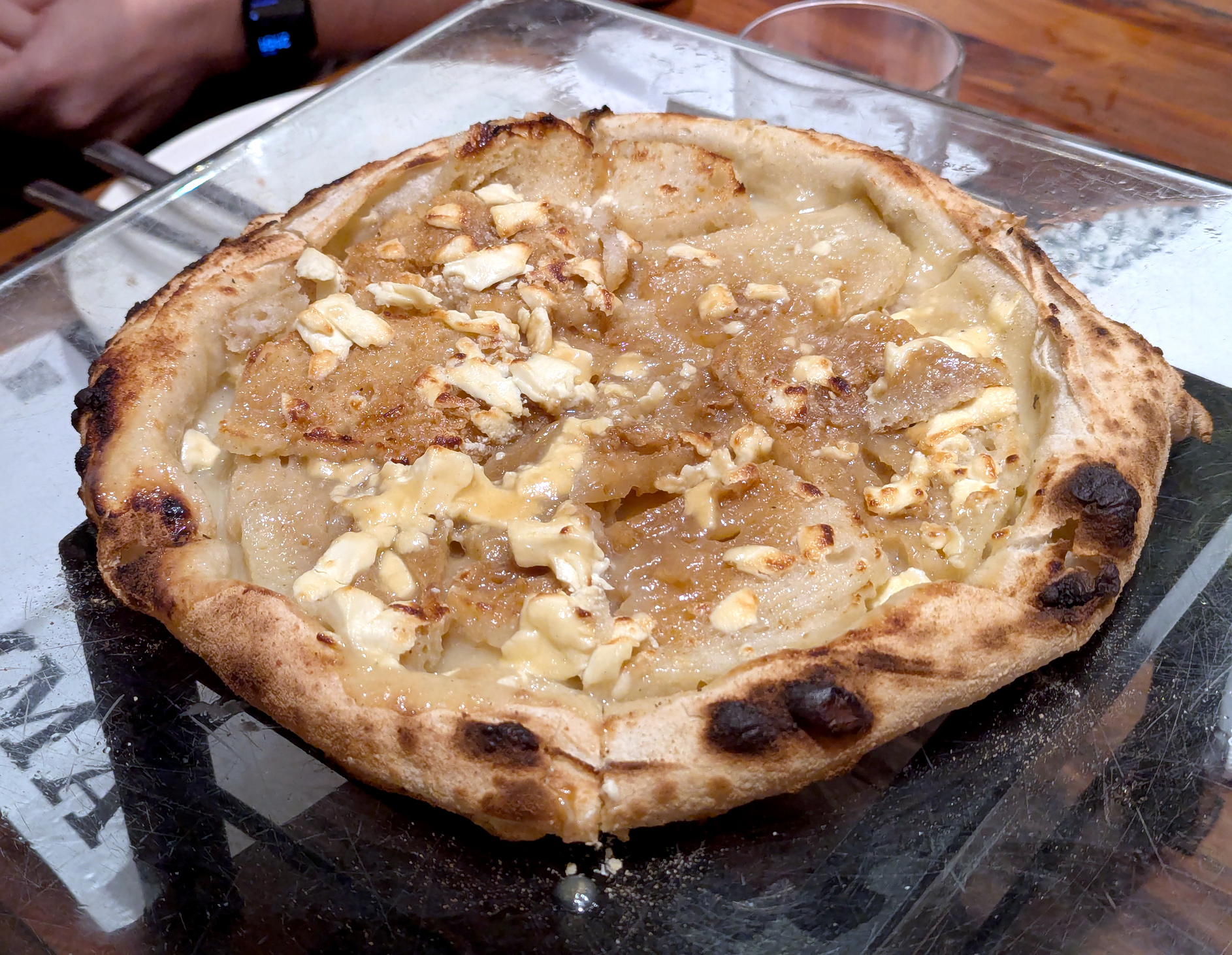
Unusual french toast (rabanada) and white chocolate pizza

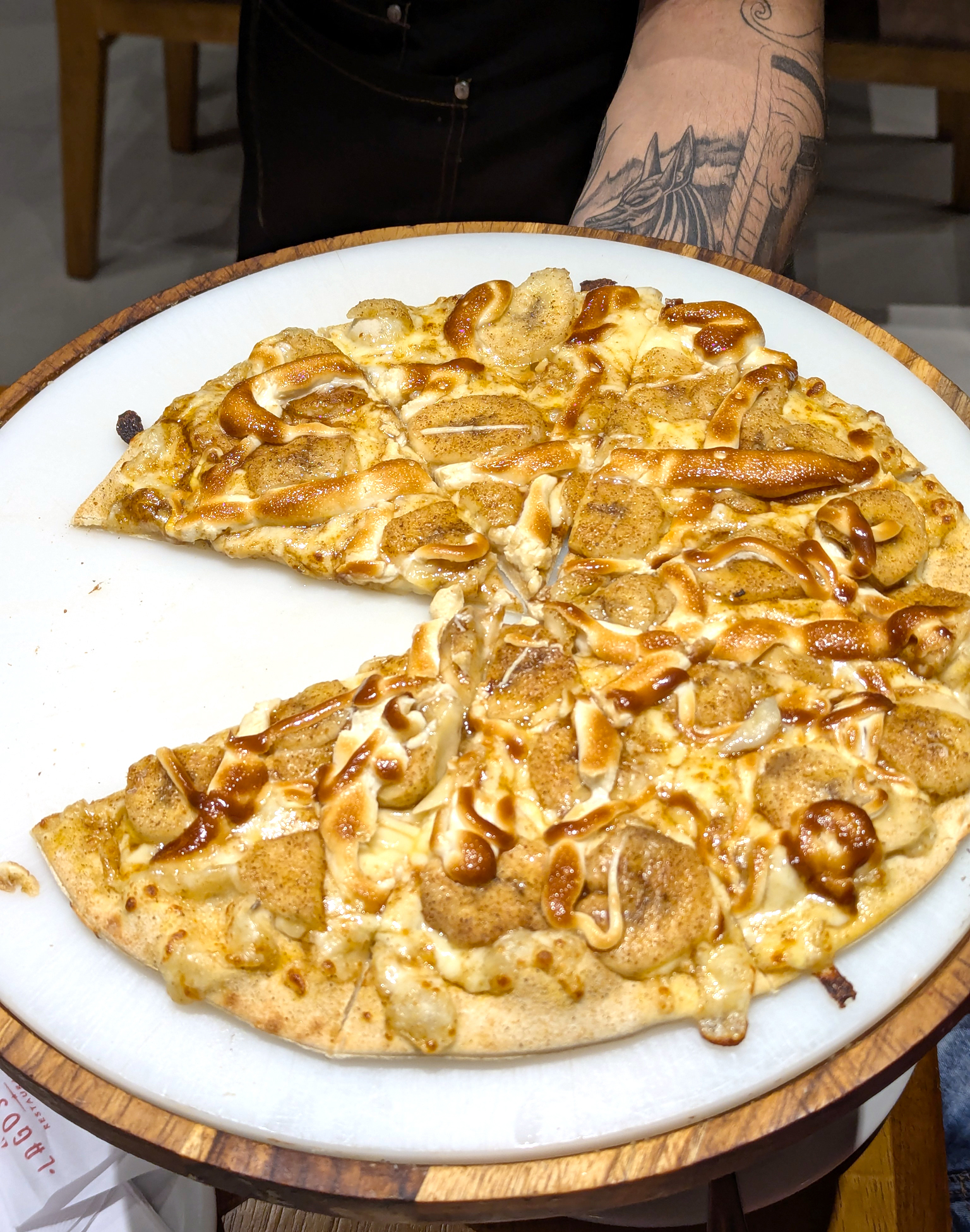
Banana nevada (lit. 'snowy banana'; mozzarella, banana slices, white chocolate) pizza being served at a rodízio restaurant

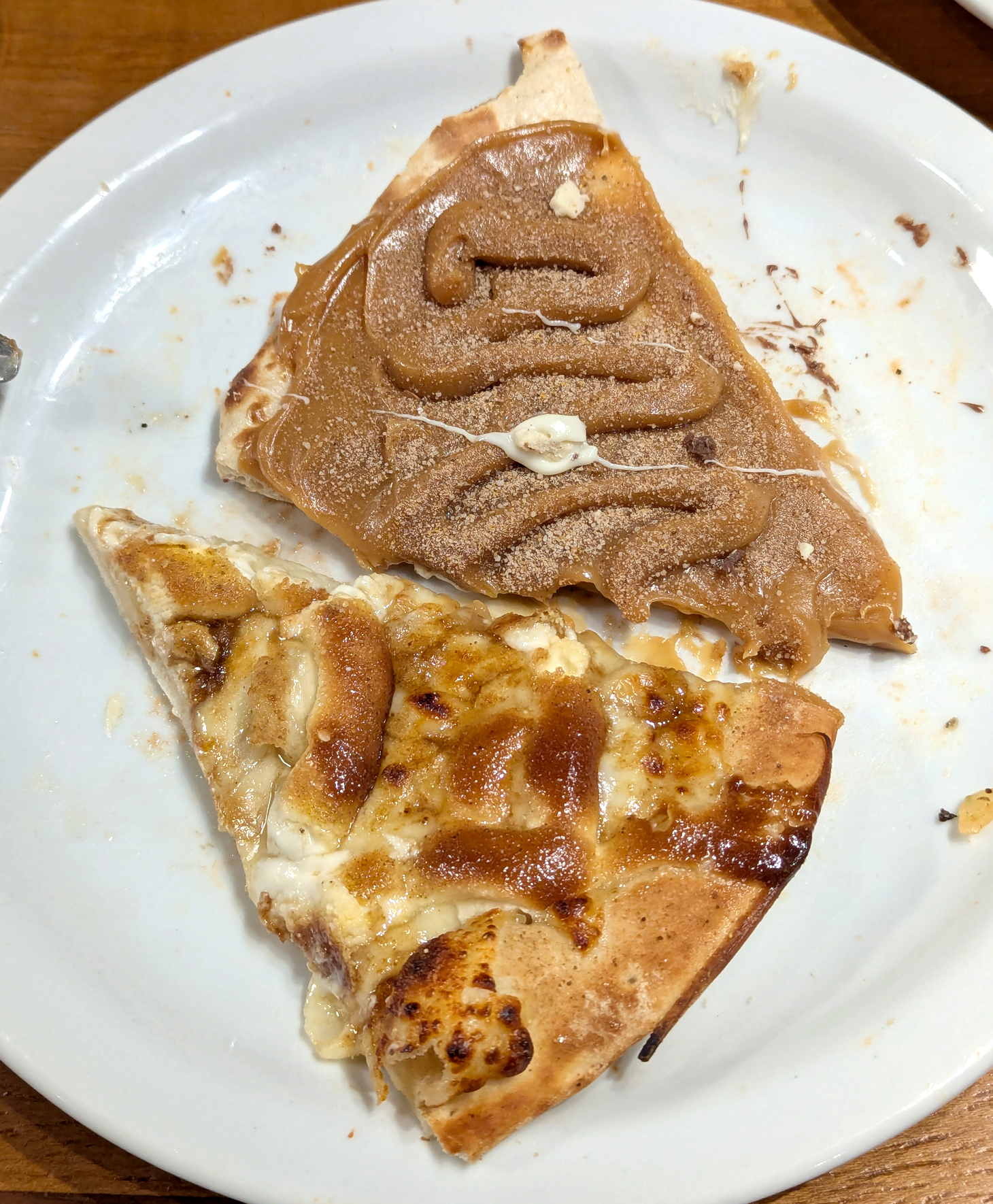
Churros (dulce de leche, sugar and cinnamon) and abacaxi nevado (lit. 'snowy pineapple'; mozzarella, pineapple cubes, white chocolate) slices

=== Stuffed crust ===
In Brazil, borda recheada (stuffed crust) is a common add-on option when purchasing pizzas. They are sometimes offered in different shapes, apart from the traditional folded dough, such as soft buns, bow ties, and twisted or star-shaped dough.

The filling can be savory or sweet, ranging from requeijão, cheddar, Gorgonzola to dulce de leche and milk or white chocolate. This is sometimes used as a built-in dessert: ordering a savory pizza with a sweet-filled stuffed crust to be eaten afterwards.

Stuffed crust is thought to have been introduced to Brazilian pizzas in the late 1990s, at first exclusively filled with requeijão, after a pizzeria owner devised it as a solution to the issue of many customers not eating the crusts.

A pizzeria in Dourados went viral in early 2024 after posting a video of its stuffed crust-only pizza, a strip of stuffed crust coiled into a pizza shape. The establishment has been selling this option for about a decade, and offers sweet and savory fillings, such as requeijão, Nutella and Ferrero Rocher.

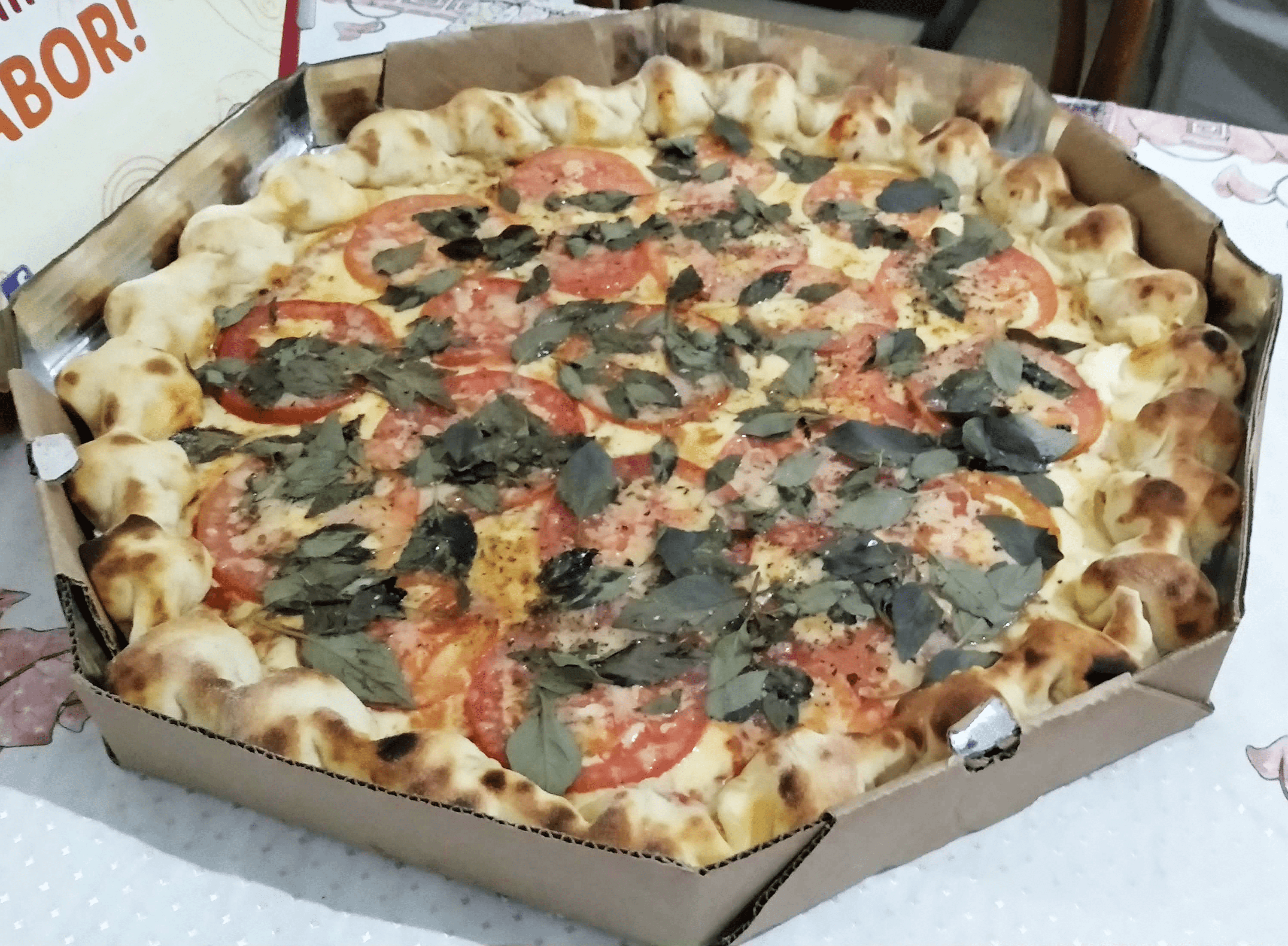
Brazilian interpretation of a Margherita pizza with requeijão-filled "soft bun" crust

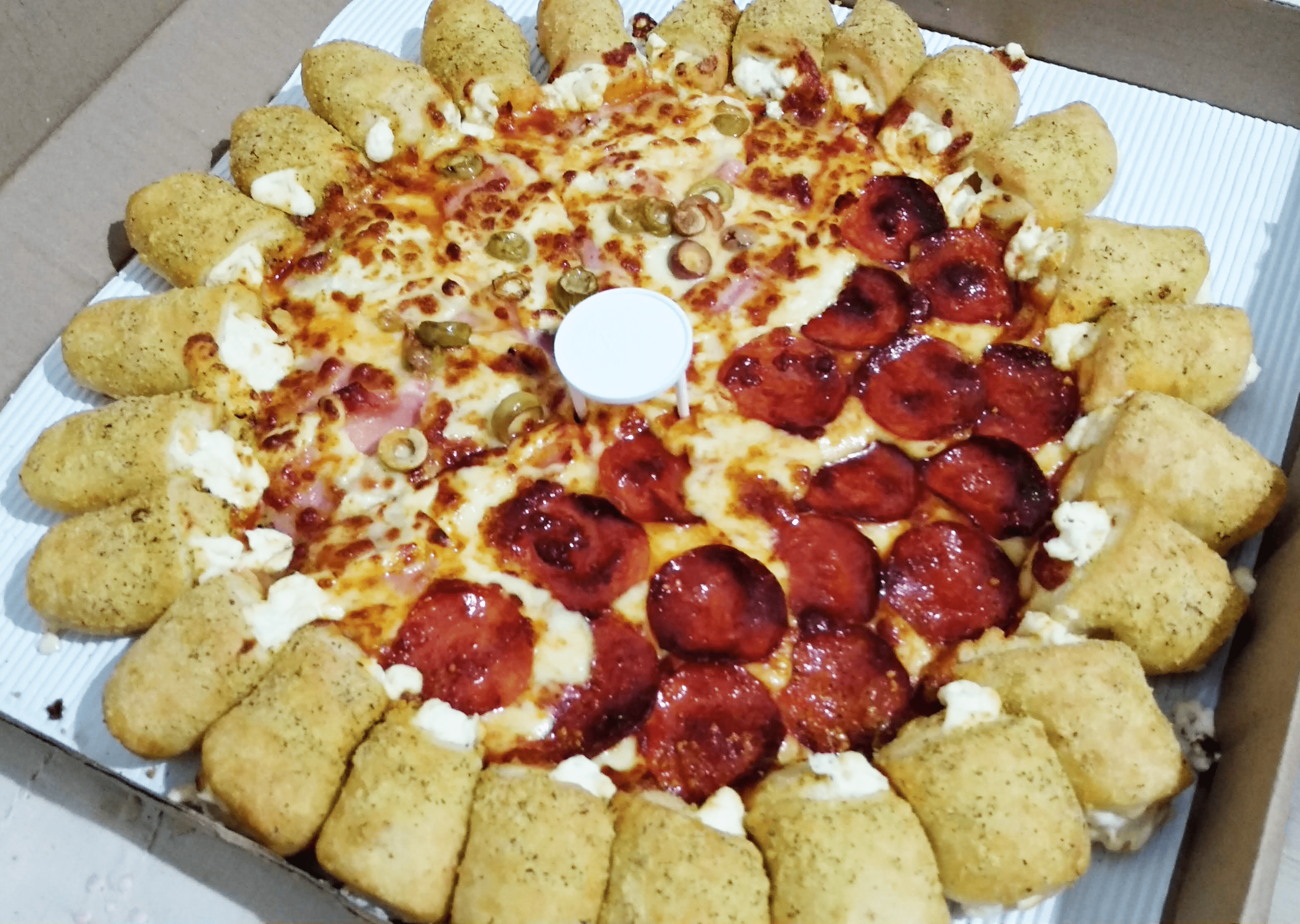
Half pepperoni, half Brazilian (ham, olives and requeijão) pizza with cream cheese-filled seasoned bun crust, from Pizza Hut

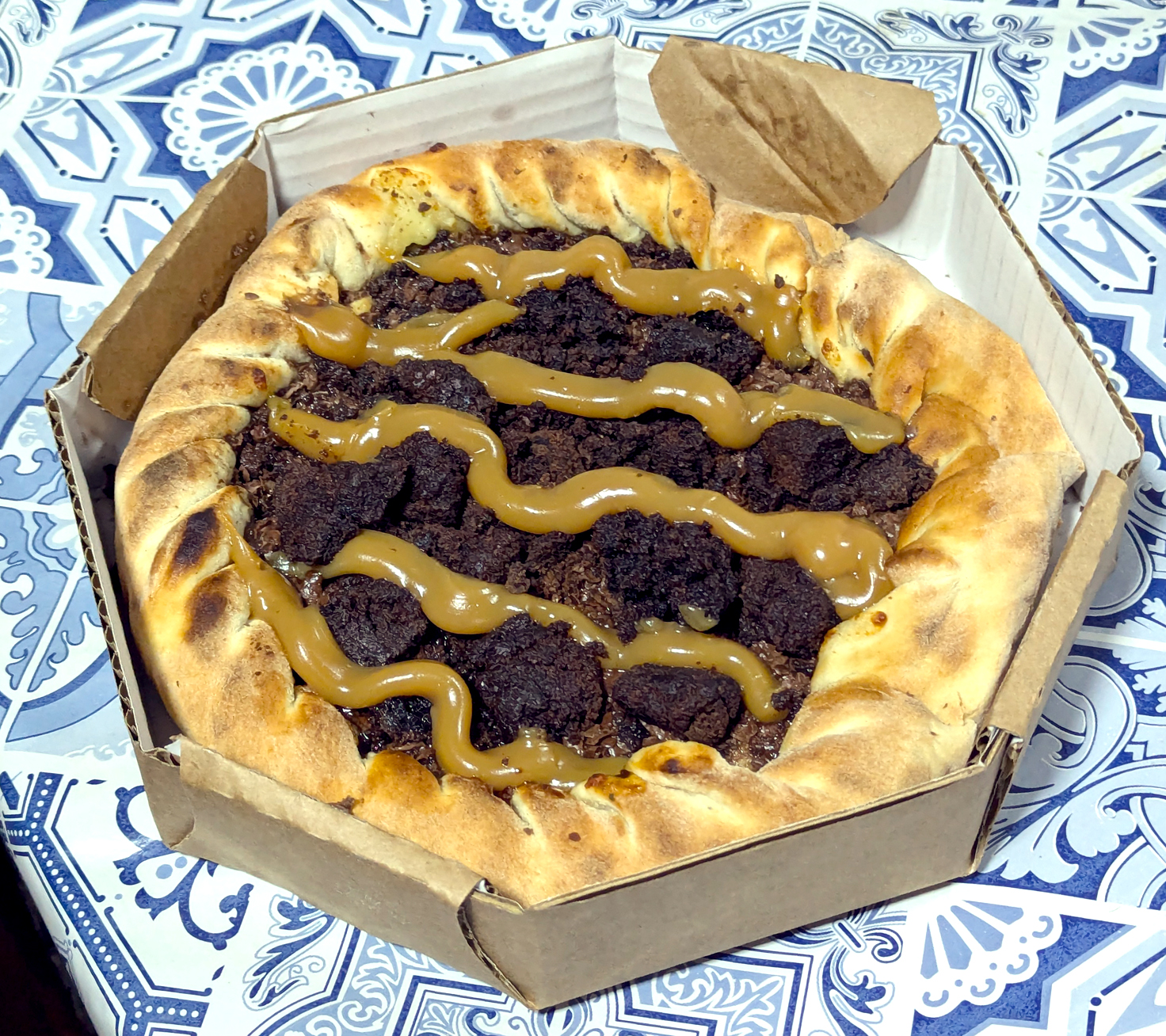
Chocolate brownie and dulce de leche pizza, with dulce de leche-filled soft crust

== In popular culture ==
To "end in pizza" ("acabar" or "terminar em pizza"), sometimes "everything ends in pizza", is a common expression in Brazilian Portuguese indicating that something came to an end without any meaningful results, or that a crime (often corruption) went unpunished. Its origin was purportedly tracked down to a football dispute from the 1960s which fizzled out after the squabblers went to a pizzeria; this was reported with the headline "Palmeiras' crisis ended in pizza" ("Crise do Palmeiras terminou em pizza").

== See also ==
- Brazilian cuisine
- List of pizza varieties by country
- History of pizza
