= Francesinha poveira =

Fast food dish from Póvoa de Varzim, Portugal

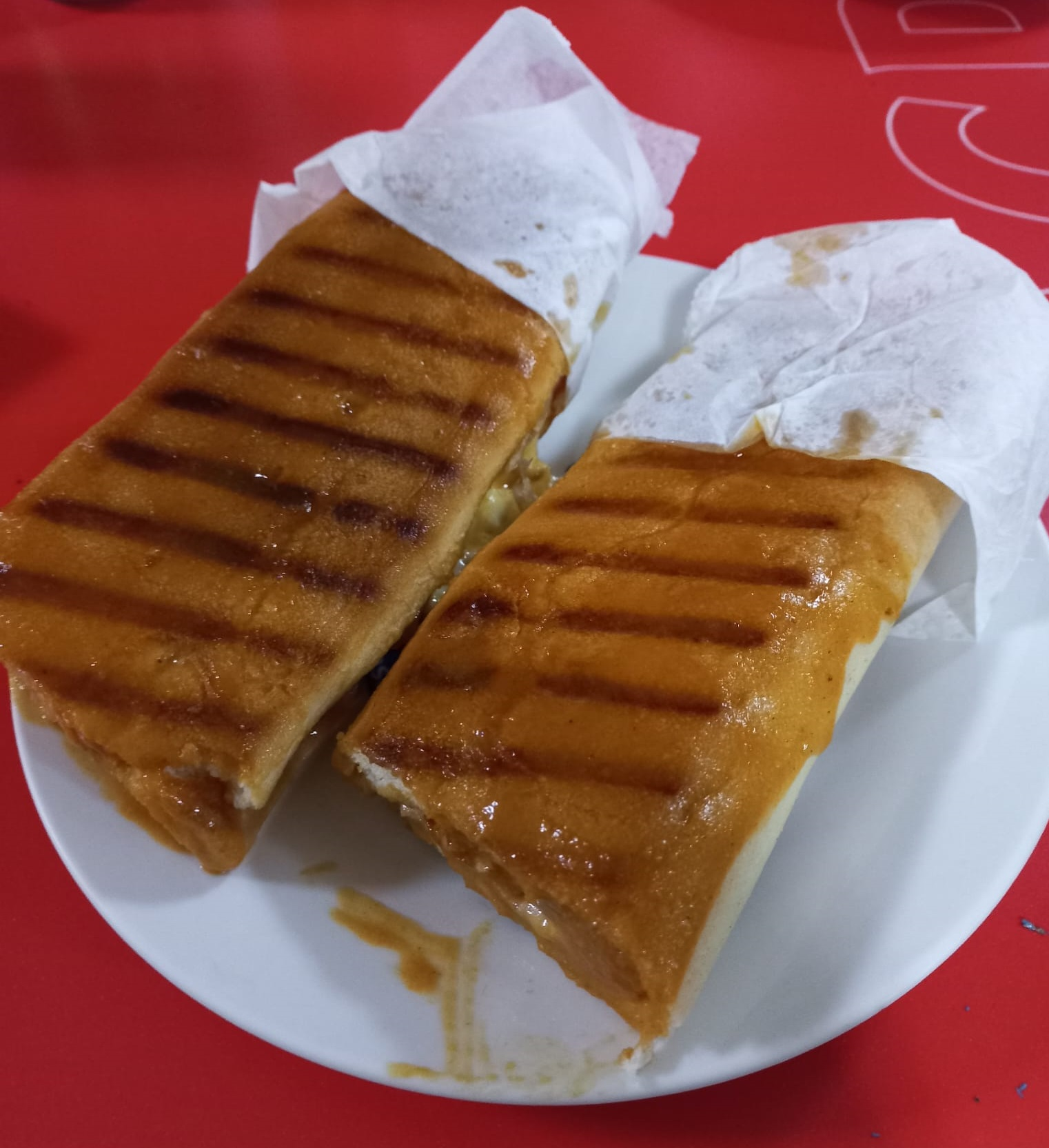
- Alternative names: Francesinha
- Type: Sandwich
- Place of origin: Portugal
- Region or state: Póvoa de Varzim
- Main ingredients: Bread (Pão Cacete or Pão de Francesinha), linguiça, fiambre, cheese, mustard

Francesinha poveira, or simply francesinha regionally, is a fast food dish from Póvoa de Varzim in Portugal. It resembles a hot dog only in shape, but the sandwich is made of linguiça (somewhat similar to a sausage), fiambre (a kind of ham), cheese and mustard in pão cacete or pão de francesinha, a type of bread that could be described as midway between a baguette and a hot dog bun.

== History ==
Francesinha poveira is the fast food variety of the francesinha dish that appeared in 1962 in café Guarda-Sol in Passeio Alegre beach square in Póvoa de Varzim. Opened since June 1922, Guarda-Sol is the oldest café-bar of Póvoa, and also the first beach bar in Portugal.

Francesinha poveira is based on the recipe from the original from Porto. The Portuan variety was created by Povoan Daniel David de Silva. The Povoan variety was made by manager Alberto Moreira, wanting to develop and promote a distinctive product. To achieve that, he went to Lisbon to find a cook and hired António Carriço, originally from Fundão. António asked the baker that supplied Guarda-Sol to create a kind of bread that should be like a small baguette, soft and tasty. With this idea the "francesinha bread" (pão de francesinha) appeared.

== Francesinha sauce ==
Francesinha is filled with a specific gravy made from with butter, margarine, tomato paste, piri piri, and seasonings (e.g. white pepper, garlic, and paprika), with cognac, brandy, port wine or whisky.

== See also ==
- List of sandwiches
