= Francesinha =

Portuguese sandwich

- Type: Sandwich
- Course: side dish
- Place of origin: Porto, Portugal
- Created by: Daniel David de Silva
- Main ingredients: bread, ham, linguiça, fresh sausage (chipolata), steak or roast meat, cheese, spiced tomato-and-beer sauce
- Variations: Egg atop, different meats or vegetarian substitutes inside, fried potato chips aside

Francesinha (Portuguese pronunciation: [fɾɐ̃sɨˈziɲɐ], meaning little Frenchie or little French sandwich) is a Portuguese sandwich, originally from Porto, made with layers of toasted bread and assorted hot meats such as roast, steak, wet-cured ham, linguiça, or chipolata, over which sliced cheese is melted by the ladling of a near-boiling tomato-and-beer sauce called molho de francesinha. It is typically served with fried potato chips.

== History ==
The francesinha is a 20th-century creation attributed to Daniel David de Silva who, upon returning to Portugal from time spent in France and Belgium, tried to adapt the croque monsieur to Portuguese tastes. In 1953, he introduced a sandwich with local meats and a custom beer-and-tomato sauce at A Regaleira, a restaurant in Rua do Bonjardim in Porto. The francesinha quickly became a popular dish, and although it remains associated with the city, it can now be found throughout Portugal.

== Variations ==
There is no standard recipe for the francesinha. Variations of the original include fillings such as pork, chicken, pastrami, tuna, cod, and vegetarian options.

Common varieties include:

- The francesinha especial (special francesinha) is a francesinha with egg and/or fried potato chips.
- Pica-pau is a breadless variant in which a steak is cut into bite-sized pieces and covered with sauce. The name pica-pau (woodpecker) references the traditional means of consumption with small skewers or toothpicks—making the diner "peck" at the dish.

Different restaurants in Portugal have special variations, such as:

- Café Barcarola (Porto): Francesinha à Barcarola – A francesinha especial with prawns and shrimp;
- Café Ábaco (Porto): Francesinha de carne assada – A francesinha especial with roast pork;
- A Cascata (Porto): Francesinha à Cascata – A francesinha especial with mushrooms and cream;

Regional variants include:

- Francesinha poveira is a form of francesinha distinctive to Póvoa de Varzim, north of Porto, created in the early 1960s. The poveira form uses different bread and sauce to form a sandwich that can be eaten by hand.

== Sauce ==
Francesinha sauce varies, with each establishment having its variation. The only common ingredient is beer. Most, though not all, sauces are tomato-based and vary in their degree of spiciness. The colour is usually red or orange.

== Reception ==
The Daily Meal included the francesinha in their article "12 Life-Changing Sandwiches You've Never Heard Of".

== Gallery ==
Francesinha especial cut in half to show the filling, at Santiago da Praça in Porto

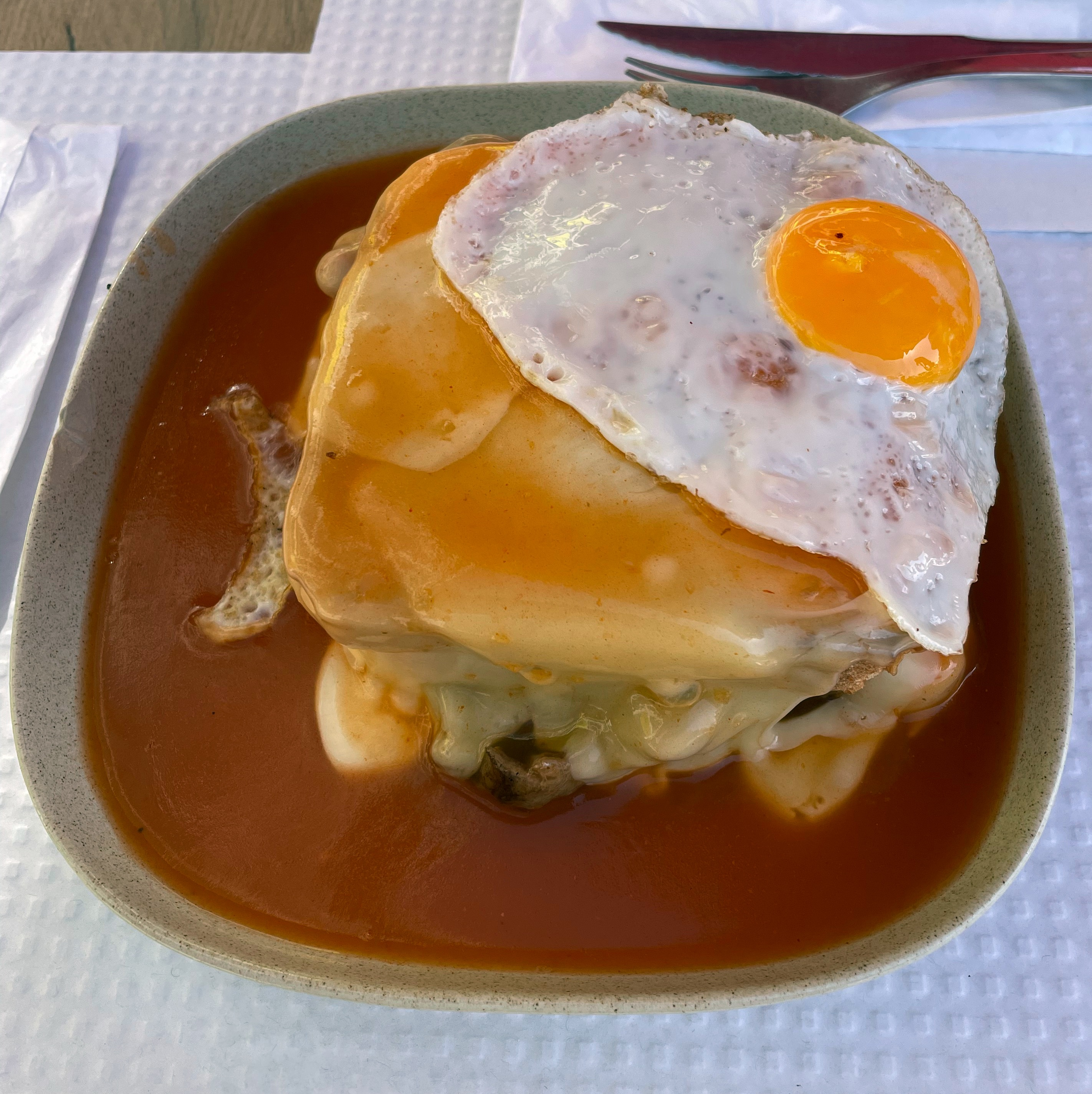
Francesinha with a fried egg, served with sauce, in Porto

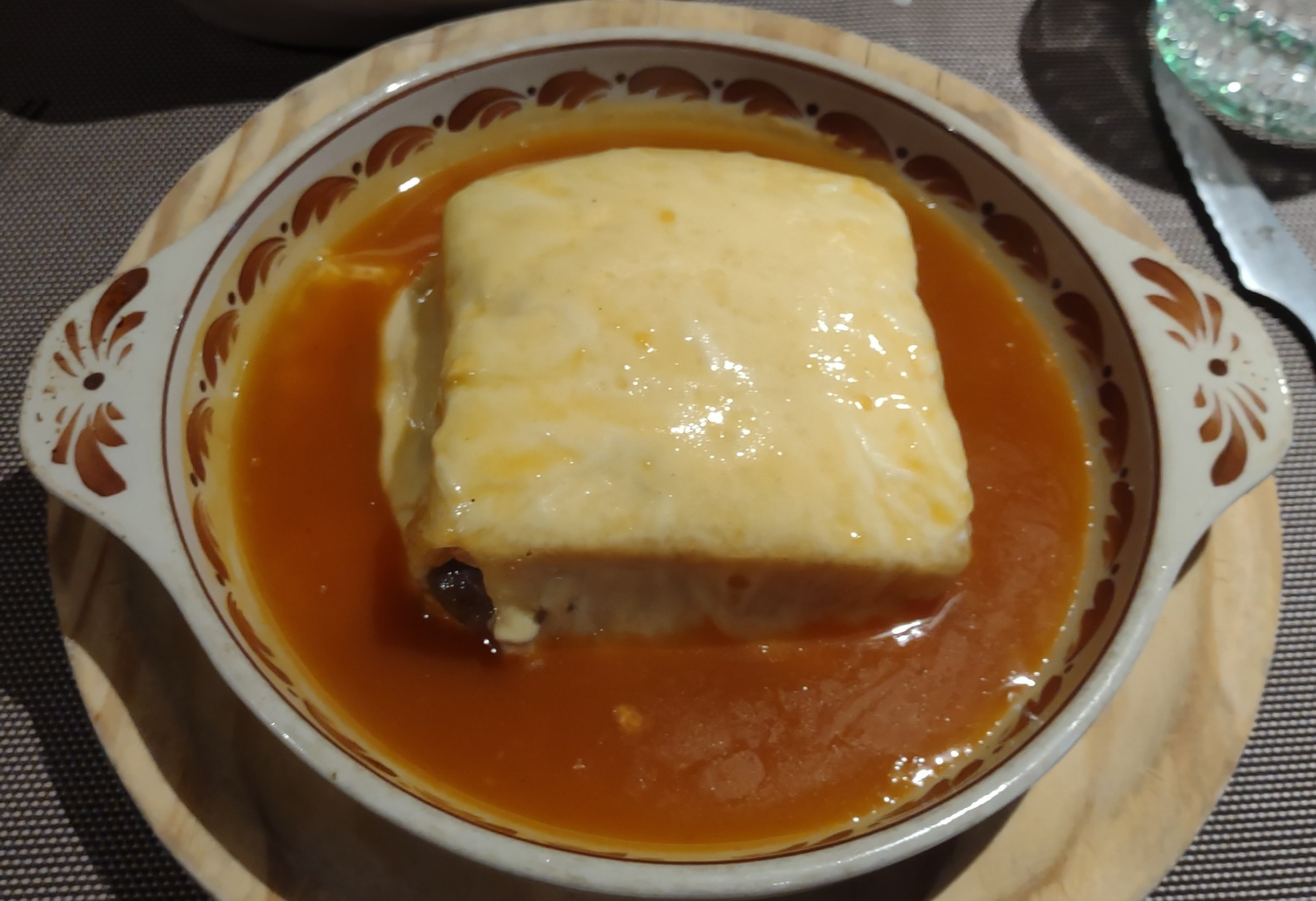
Francesinha topped with melted cheese, served in a handled dish

Francesinhas being prepared in the kitchen at Santiago da Praça in Porto

== See also ==
- Croque monsieur
- Porto
- Portuguese cuisine
- List of sandwiches
