= Linguiça calabresa =

Brazilian sausage

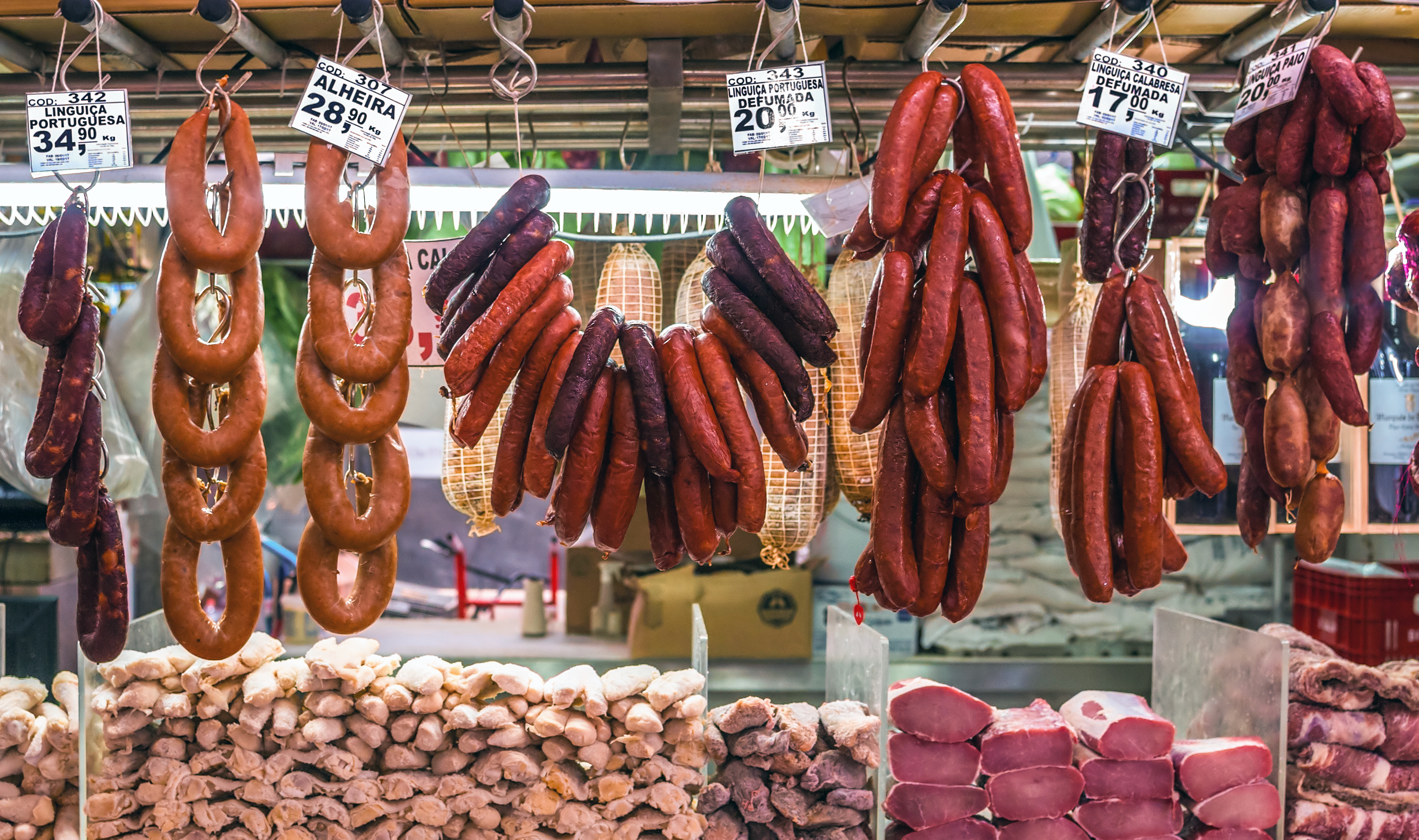
Varieties of Linguiça Calabrese on display at the Municipal Market of São Paulo.

Linguiça calabresa (Calabrian sausage) is a type of seasoned Brazilian linguiça. It originated in the Bixiga neighborhood of the city of São Paulo in 1937, created by Italian immigrants who were inspired by a sausage found in Calabria (salsiccia di Calabria). Linguiça calabresa, consumed throughout the country, is widely used in pizzas, barbecues, sandwiches, and feijoada.

In Brazil, Normative Instruction No. 4/2000 of the Ministry of Agriculture defined the classification of some varieties of sausage, among which are Calabrian sausages. This standard defines it as, made exclusively from pork, cured, with added ingredients, and having the characteristic spicy flavor of Calabrian pepper, subjected or not to a drying or similar process for dehydration and/or cooking, with smoking being optional.

== See also ==
- Linguiça
- Pizza in Brazil
- List of sausages
