= Linguiça =

Type of Portuguese smoke-cured pork sausage

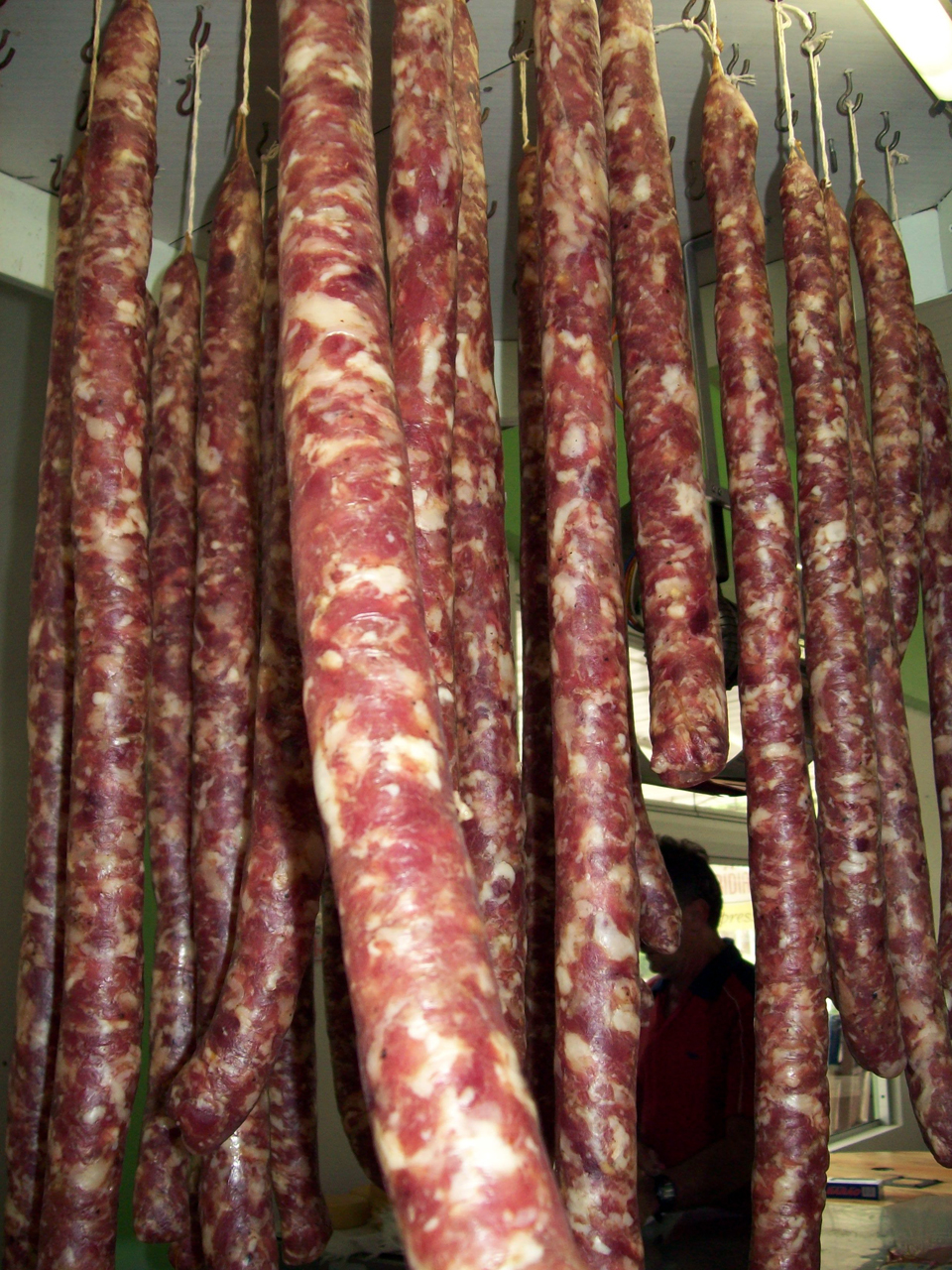
Linguiça for sale in Espírito Santo, Brazil

Linguiça (Portuguese: [lĩˈɡwisɐ]) is a Portuguese sausage made from pork and seasoned with onion, garlic, paprika and other spices. It can be used fresh in cooked preparations or undergo a curing and preservation process through smoking.

== Uses in Portuguese cuisine ==
Linguiça, like many other sausages, is generally served as part of a meal, typically accompanied by rice, beans, and other pork products. Feijoada, for example, is a traditional Portuguese dish (considered Brazil's national dish), also common in Angola, that incorporates linguiça with beans, ham hocks, and other foods.

In the Bixiga neighborhood of São Paulo, one variant is especially popular: the linguiça calabresa or simply calabresa, prepared originally with Calabrese chili pepper by Italian immigrants, and particularly used in pizzas as a spicy sausage. Its popularity compares with pepperoni in the United States. It is common to differentiate the linguiça calabresa from its counterpart linguiça portuguesa, prepared from the original Portuguese recipe, and also served in pizzas as a mild sausage, generally with egg slices.

Linguiça is also used in francesinha, a traditional Portuguese dish, from Porto. The linguiça is incorporated in its sauce, giving it a distinct flavour.

== Popularity and uses outside Portugal and Brazil ==
Outside of Portugal, linguiça is also popular in Goa, Macau, and other former Portuguese colonial possessions. In these regions, it is typically sliced before being grilled or braised, often with a light-bodied beer. It is also popular in California, Rhode Island, and southern Massachusetts.In Mangalore Chorizo is known as Linguica and cooked with onions, Bafat Masala and Potatoes, usually over a wood fire, and eaten with sannas, a type of steamed rice cake or bread.

In Hawaii, linguiça is known as "Portuguese sausage", and is commonly eaten for breakfast. The sausage is usually smoked using banana leaves. Even the Hawaiian McDonald's breakfast menu features Portuguese sausage, along with other Hawaiian foods such as rice and formerly saimin.

== See also ==
- List of smoked foods
