= List of African cuisines =

List of culinary traditions of Africa

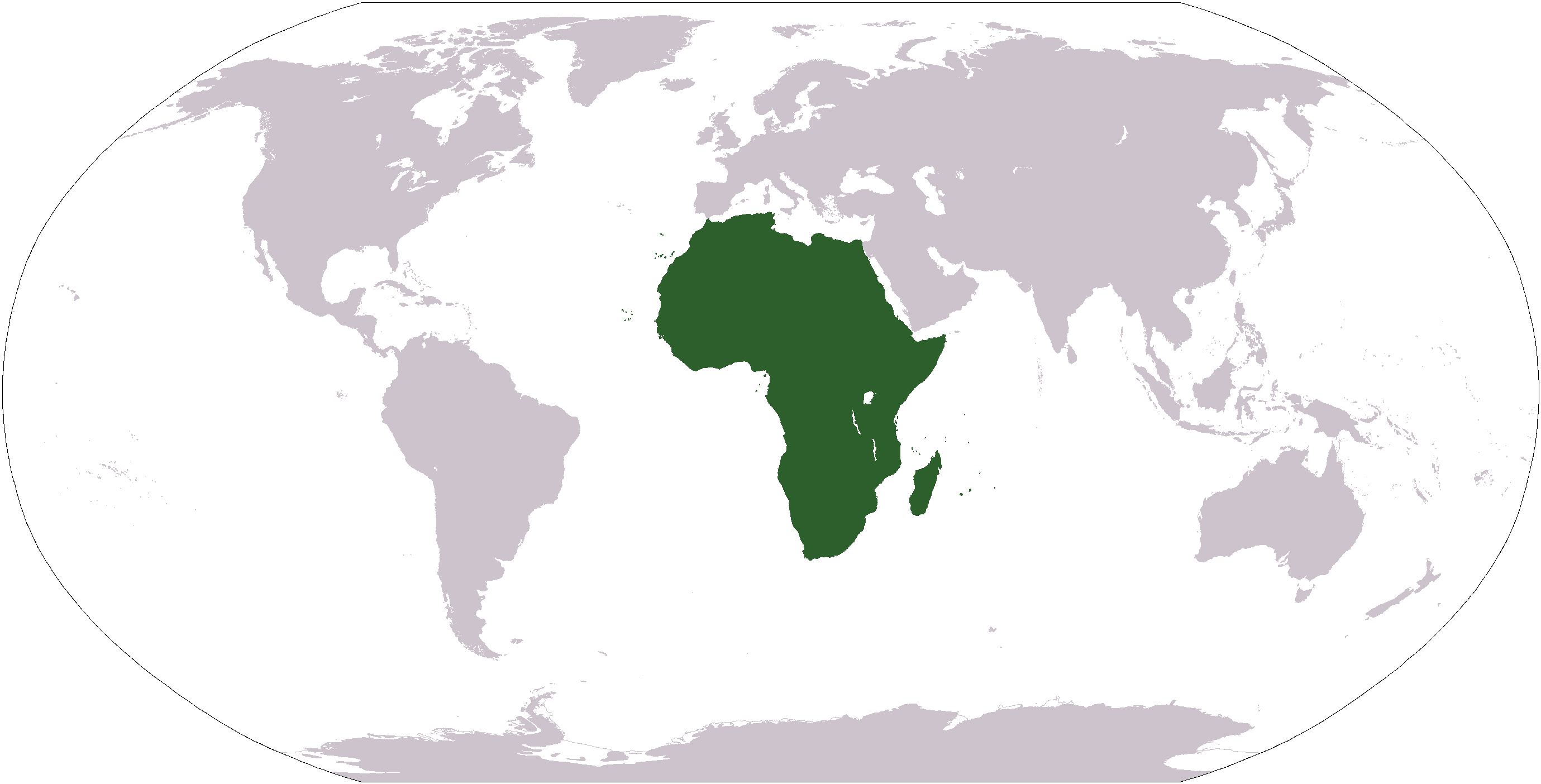

This is a list of African cuisines. A cuisine is a characteristic style of cooking practices and traditions, often associated with a specific culture. The various cuisines of Africa use a combination of locally available fruits, cereal grains and vegetables, as well as milk and meat products. In some parts of the continent, the traditional diet features a preponderance of milk, curd and whey products. The continent's diverse demographic makeup is reflected in the many different eating and drinking habits, dishes, and preparation techniques of its manifold populations.

== Central African cuisine ==
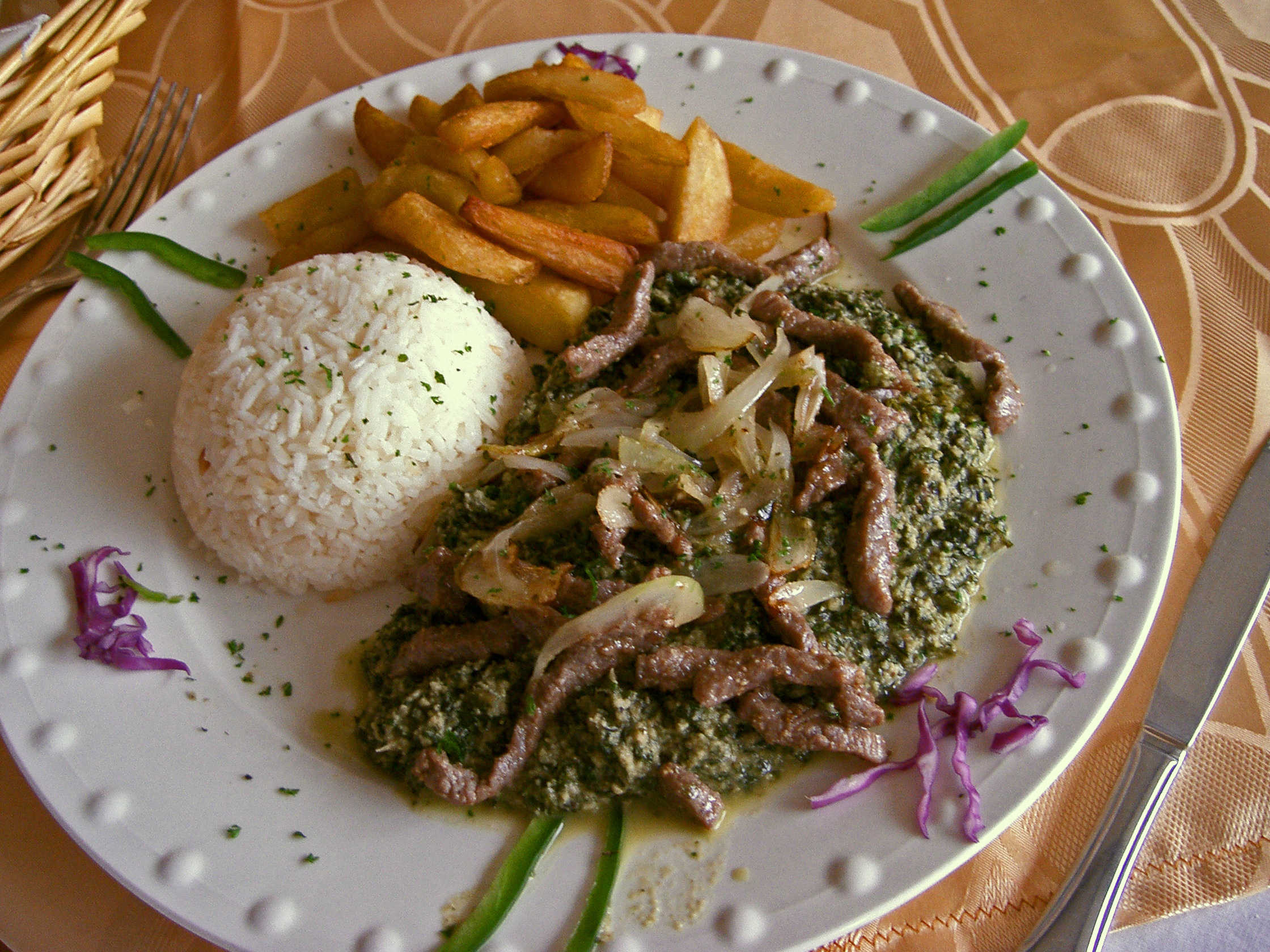
Ndolé is the national dish of Cameroon.

Central Africa stretches from the Tibesti Mountains in the north to the vast rainforest basin of the Congo River, the highlands of Kivu and the savana of Katanga.

This region has received culinary influence of the Swahilis (culture that evolved via the combination of Bantu, Yemeni, Omani and Indian cultures) during the East African Slave Trade. Swahili culinary influences can be found in dishes such as mandanzi, pilaf rice, kachumbari, sambsusa, and kuku paka.

Central African cuisine has also been influenced by the Portuguese, by way of the Kongo and Ndongo Kingdoms. Salt fish was introduced following trade in the late 17th century, and the Kikongo term for salt fish, makayabu, comes from the term bacalhau (ba-cal-ha-u).

The Portuguese culinary influence is especially prominent in Angola, Sao Tomé and Equatorial Guinea. Central Africa has also been influenced by the cuisine of the regions East, West and Southern Africa because of their close proximity, e.g. babuté/bobotie is shared with the south, nyama choma with the east and gombos with West Africa.

The main ingredients are plantains, cassava, rice, kwanga (cassava dumpling) and yam. Fufu-like starchy foods are usually made from fermented cassava roots, but they can also be made with plantain, corn maize and yam. Fufu is served buffet style with grilled meat, fish, stews, greens and piment. A variety of local ingredients are used while preparing other dishes like spinach stew cooked with tomato, peppers, chillis, onions, and peanut butter. Eastern central Africa is also one of the few regions in Africa that uses potatoes as one of its main bases, since potatoes grow easily in the region.

Cassava plants are also consumed as cooked greens. Groundnut (peanut) stew is also prepared, containing chicken, okra, ginger, and other spices. Beef and chicken are favorite meat dishes, but game meat preparations containing crocodile, elephant, antelope and warthog are also served occasionally. Another favorite is bambara, a porridge of rice, peanut butter and sugar. A jomba is the bundling of foods in fresh green plantain leaves and then cooking them over hot coals or fire.

- Cameroonian cuisine is one of the most varied in Africa due to its location on the crossroads between the north, west, and center of the continent; added to this is the profound influence of French food, a legacy of the colonial era.
- Congolese cuisine (Democratic Republic of the Congo) is one of the most diverse cuisines of the continent since it sits between east and southern Africa and received culinary influence from the Portuguese and Middle Eastern and Indian influences via the Swahili. Moambé chicken is the national dish.
- Centrafrican cuisine in the Central African Republic includes Middle Eastern and French influences.

== East African cuisine ==
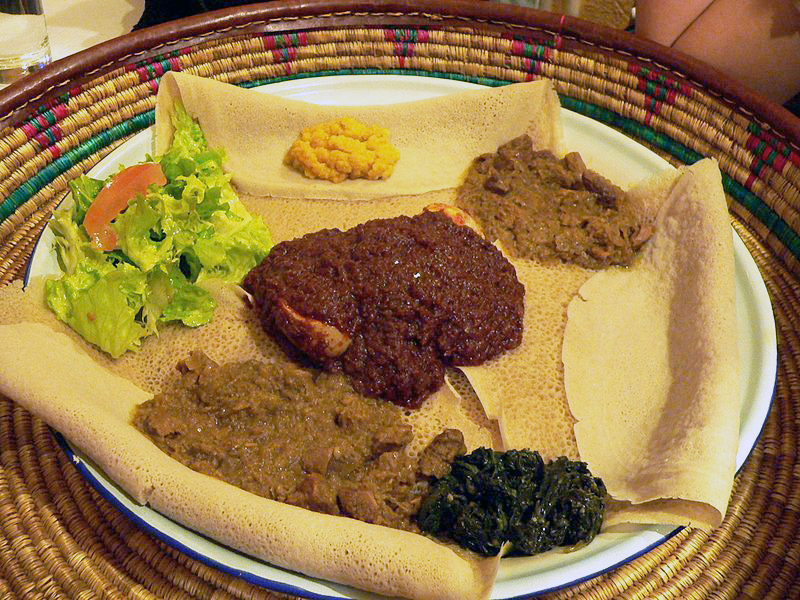
Injera bread and several kinds of wat (stew) are typical of Ethiopian and Eritrean cuisine.

- East African cuisine: East Africa is the eastern region of the African continent, variably defined by geography or geopolitics. In the UN scheme of geographic regions, 19 territories constitute Eastern Africa: This is a vast region with many diverse cuisines.

- Burundian cuisine - Burundi is situated in Eastern Africa and has a territory full of mountains, savannas and agricultural fields, with forests in the surrounding of rivers and waters. Agriculture is spread on 80% of the country's surface and it especially includes coffee, tea, corn, beans and manioc.
- Eritrean cuisine is a fusion of Eritrea's native culinary traditions, and the area's long history of trade and social interchanges with other regions and cultures.
- Ethiopian cuisine and Eritrean cuisine characteristically consist of spicy vegetable and meat dishes, usually in the form of wat (or wot), a thick stew, served atop injera, a large sourdough flatbread, which is about 50 centimetres (20 inches) in diameter and made out of fermented teff flour. Ethiopians eat with their right hands, using pieces of injera to pick up bites of entrées and side dishes. Utensils are rarely used with this dish.
- Kenyan cuisine - There is no singular dish that represents all of Kenya. Different communities have their own native foods. Staples are maize and other cereals depending on the region including millet and sorghum eaten with various meats and vegetables. The foods that are universally eaten in Kenya are ugali, sukuma wiki, and nyama choma.
- Somali cuisine varies from region to region and is a fusion of native Somali culinary traditions with influences from Yemeni, Persian, Indian and Italian cuisines.
- Tanzanian cuisine - Along the coastal regions (Dar es Salaam, Tanga, Bagamoyo, Zanzibar and Pemba), spicy foods are common, and there is also much use of coconut milk. Regions in Tanzania's mainland also have their own unique foods.
- Ugandan cuisine consists of traditional and modern cooking styles, practices, foods and dishes in Uganda, with English, Arab, Asian and especially Indian influences. Like the cuisines of most countries, it varies in complexity, from the most basic, a starchy filler with a sauce of beans or meat, to several-course meals served in upper-class homes and high-end restaurants.
- Maasai cuisine - The staple diet of the Maasai consists of cow's milk and maize meal. The cuisine also consists of soups from plants and fruits. More recently, the Maasai have grown dependent on food produced in other areas such as maize meal, rice, potatoes, and cabbage (known to the Maasai as "goat leaves").

== North African cuisine ==
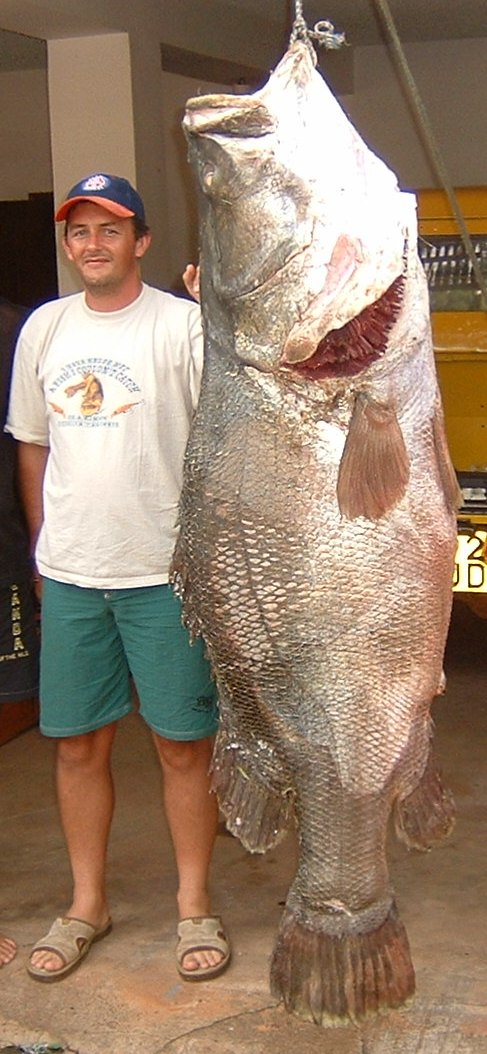
Nile perch are one of the world's largest freshwater fish and a significant food source. It reaches a maximum length of over six feet, weighing up to 440 lbs, although many fish are caught before growing this large. It is widespread throughout much of the Afrotropical realm.

- North African or Maghrebi cuisine includes cuisines from regions along the Mediterranean Sea, inland areas and includes several nations, including Sudan, Algeria, Egypt, Libya, Morocco, and Tunisia.
  In North African cuisine, the most common staple foods are meat, seafood, goat, lamb, beef, dates, kebab, shawarma, falafel, almonds, olives, various vegetables and fruit.
  Because the region is predominantly Muslim, halal meats are usually eaten. The best-known North African/Berber dishes abroad are surely couscous and tajine.

- Algerian cuisine is a distinct fusion of Berber, Arab, Ottoman and French cuisines.

- Algerian wine

- Egyptian cuisine consists of the local culinary traditions of Egypt. Egyptian cuisine makes heavy use of legumes and vegetables, as Egypt's rich Nile Valley and Delta produce large quantities of high-quality crops.

- Egyptian wine

- Libyan cuisine is the cooking traditions, practices, foods and dishes associated with the country of Libya. The cuisine derives much from the culinary traditions of the Mediterranean and North Africa, with an Italian influence, a legacy from the days when Libya was an Italian colony.
- Moroccan cuisine is extremely diverse, thanks to Morocco's interaction with other cultures and nations over the centuries. Moroccan cuisine has been subject to Berber, Moorish, Mediterranean, and Middle Eastern influences. The cooks in the royal kitchens of Fez, Meknes, Marrakesh, Rabat and Tetouan refined it over the centuries and created the basis for what is known as Moroccan cuisine today.

- Moroccan wine

- Sudanese cuisine varies by region and has been influenced by the cross-cultural influences upon Sudan throughout history. In addition to the indigenous African peoples, the cuisine was influenced by Arab traders and settlers during the Ottoman Empire, who introduced spices such as red pepper and garlic.
- Tunisian cuisine is the cuisine of Tunisia, a blend of Mediterranean and desert dwellers' culinary traditions. Its distinctive spicy fieriness comes from neighboring Mediterranean countries and the many civilizations which have ruled the land now known as Tunisia: Phoenicians, Romans, Arabs, Ottoman Empire, French, and the native Berber people.

== Southern African cuisine ==
- South African cuisine is sometimes referred to as "rainbow cuisine" because it is based on multicultural and various indigenous cuisines. Curried dishes are popular with lemon juice in South Africa among people of all ethnic origins; many dishes came to the country with the thousands of Indian laborers brought to South Africa in the nineteenth century. South African cuisine can be defined as cookery practiced by indigenous people of South Africa such as the Khoisan and Xhosa, Zulu- and Sotho-speaking people, and settler cookery that emerged from several waves of immigration introduced during the colonial period by people of Indian and Afrikaner and British descent and their slaves and servants.
- Botswana cuisine is unique but also shares some characteristics with other cuisine of Southern Africa. Examples of Botswana food include pap, samp, vetkoek and mopane worms. A food unique to Botswana includes seswaa, heavily salted mashed-up meat.
- Malagasy cuisine is the cuisine of the island country of Madagascar, located in the Indian Ocean off the south-eastern coast of Africa. Malagasy are mostly of Malayan Polynesian, along with African, Arab, Indian and European descent. Rice is a common staple food, and fruits and vegetables are prominent in the cuisine. Pineapples, mangoes, peaches, grapes, avocados and lychee are grown on the island. Meats include chicken, beef and fish, and curry dishes are common. A common food is laoka, a mixture of cooked foods served with rice. Laoka are most often served in some kind of sauce: in the highlands, this sauce is generally tomato-based, while in coastal areas coconut milk is often added during cooking.
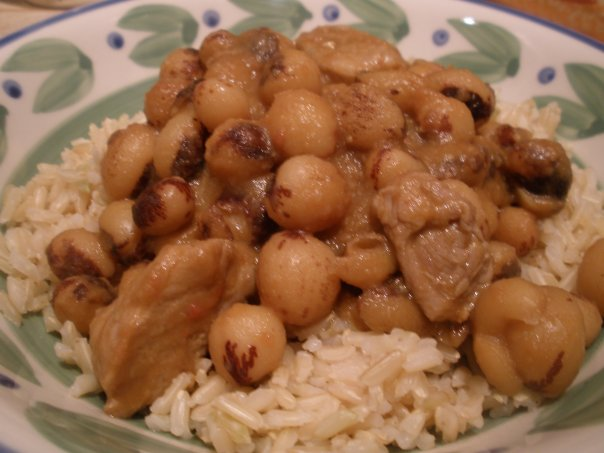
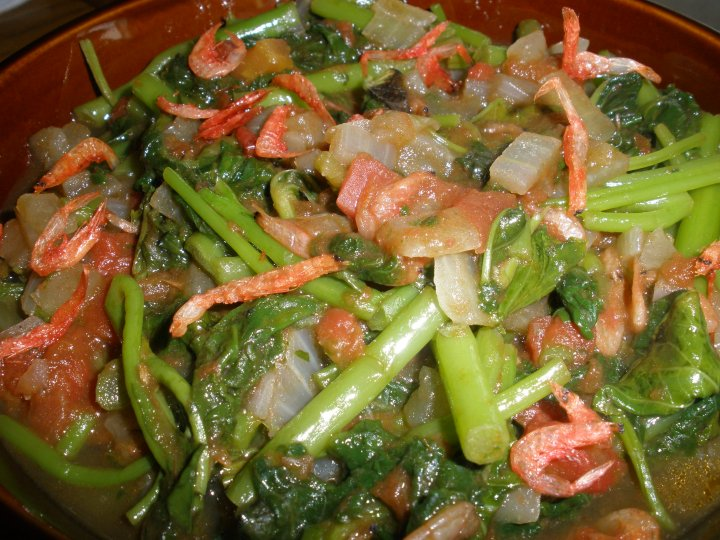
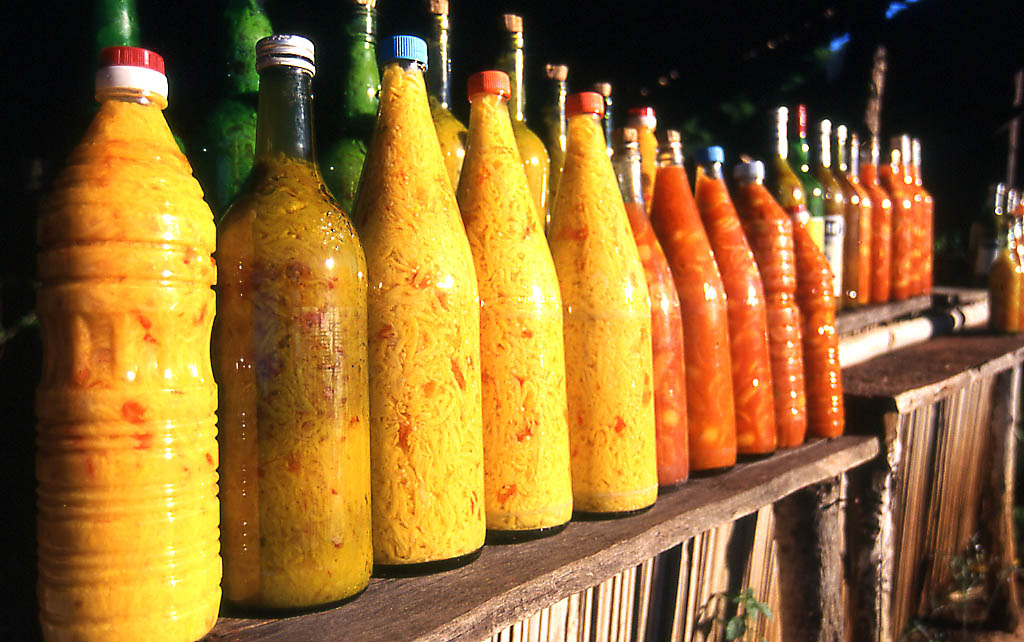
Malagasy cuisine: Two common Malagasy laokas: bambara groundnut and pork (left) and potato leaves with dried shrimp (center), usually served atop rice. On the right are bottles of lemon and mango sauces (achards), which are common in the northwestern coastal regions of Madagascar.

- Mauritian cuisine is the cuisine of the island country of Mauritius. It is mostly influenced by the diverse cuisines of migrants to Mauritius.
- Namibian cuisine is the cuisine of Namibia. It is influenced by the cookery practiced by indigenous people of Namibia and settler cookery introduced during the colonial period by people of German, Afrikaner and British descent.

- Namibian wine

- South African cuisine is sometimes called "rainbow cuisine", as it has had a variety of multicultural sources and stages. Influences include indigenous practices and settler cookery that immigrants practiced. Their staple food is pap this is made using cornmeal and boiled water, South Africans also enjoy this dish served with braai meat. This is usually served at social gatherings.

- South African wine
- Western Cape wine

- Zimbabwean cuisine - Like in many African countries, the majority of Zimbabweans depend on a few staple foods. "mealie meal", also known as cornmeal, is used to prepare sadza or isitshwala and porridge known as bota or ilambazi. Zimbabwean cuisine also includes fruits and vegetables such as imbhida also known as African kale. Corn is also used to make dishes such as umxhanxa, which is made using boiled pumpkin and corn.

== West African cuisine ==
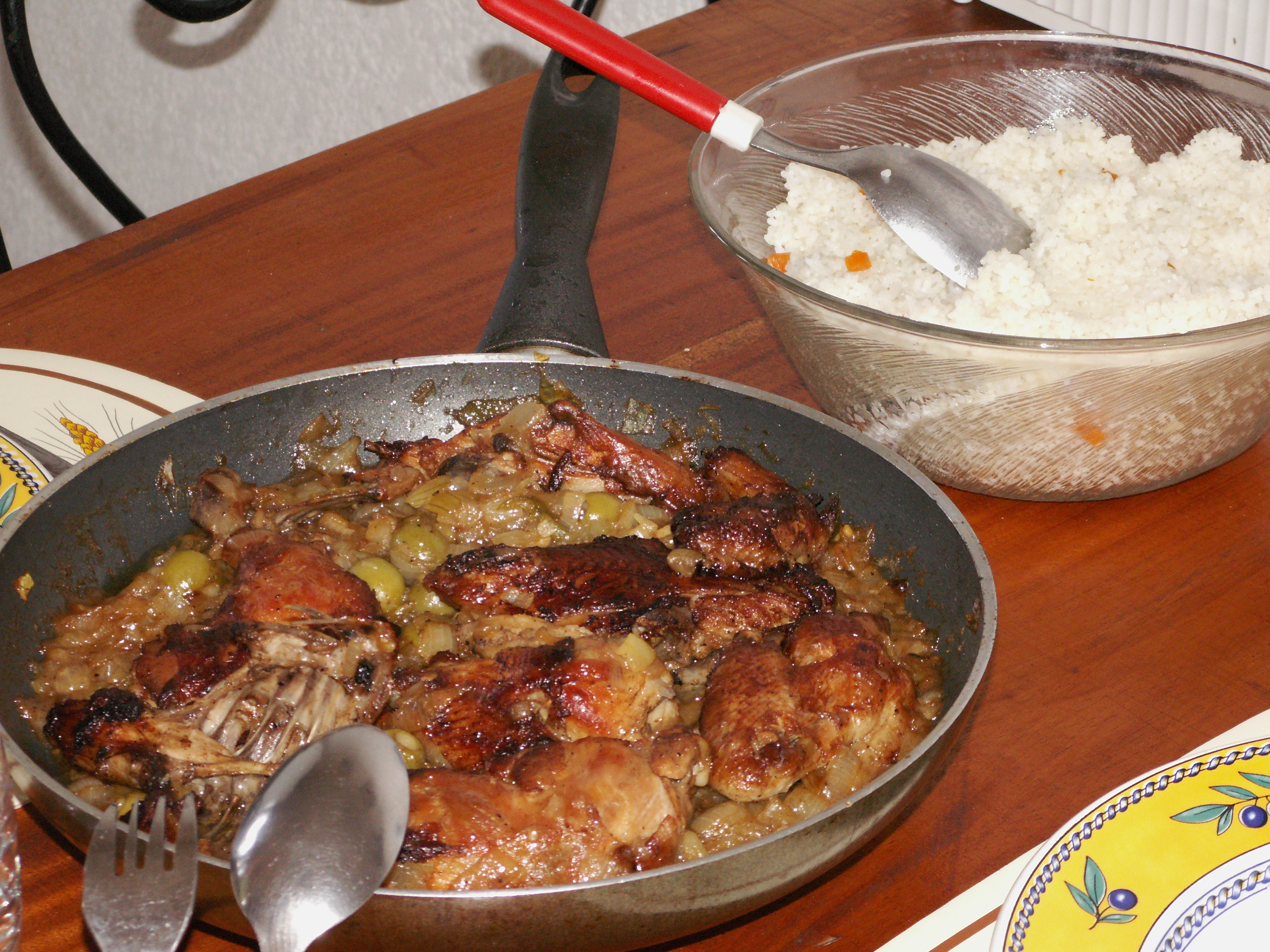
Yassa is a popular dish throughout West Africa prepared with chicken or fish. Chicken yassa is pictured.

- West African cuisine refers to many distinct regional and ethnic cuisines in West African nations, a large geographic area with climates ranging from desert to tropical. Some of the region's indigenous plants, such as Hausa groundnuts, pigeon peas and cowpeas, provide dietary protein for both people and livestock. Many significant spices, stimulants and medicinal herbs originated in the evergreen and deciduous forests of Western Africa. Ancient Africans domesticated the kola nut and coffee, now used globally in beverages.

- Burkinabe cuisine is the cuisine of Burkina Faso. It is similar to the cuisines in many parts of West Africa, and is based around staple foods of sorghum, millet, rice, maize, peanuts, potatoes, beans, yams and okra. Grilled meat is common, particularly mutton, goat, beef and fish.
- Ghanaian cuisine is the cuisine of Ghana. There are diverse traditional dishes. Foods also vary according to the season, time of the day and occasion.
- Ivorian cuisine is the traditional cuisine of Côte d'Ivoire, or the Ivory Coast, and is based on tubers, grains, chicken, seafood, fish, fresh fruits, vegetables and spices and is very similar to that of neighboring countries in west Africa. Common staple foods include grains and tubers. Côte d'Ivoire is one of the largest cocoa producers in the world, and also produces palm oil and coffee.
- Nigerian cuisine, like other West African cuisines, uses spices and herbs in conjunction with palm oil or groundnut oil to create deeply flavored sauces and soups often made very hot with chili peppers. Nigerian feasts are colorful and lavish, while aromatic market and roadside snacks cooked on barbecues or fried in oil are plentiful and varied.
- Sierra Leonean cuisine refers to the cuisine and eating styles found in the Republic of Sierra Leone, a country in West Africa. Sierra Leonean cuisine includes cassava bread, fried fish, and okra soup.
- Senegalese cuisine has been influenced by nations like France, Portugal, and those of North Africa, and also by many ethnic groups, the largest being the Wolof; Islam, which first penetrated the region in the 11th century; and various European cultures, especially the French, who held the country as a colony until 1960.

African foods and dishes

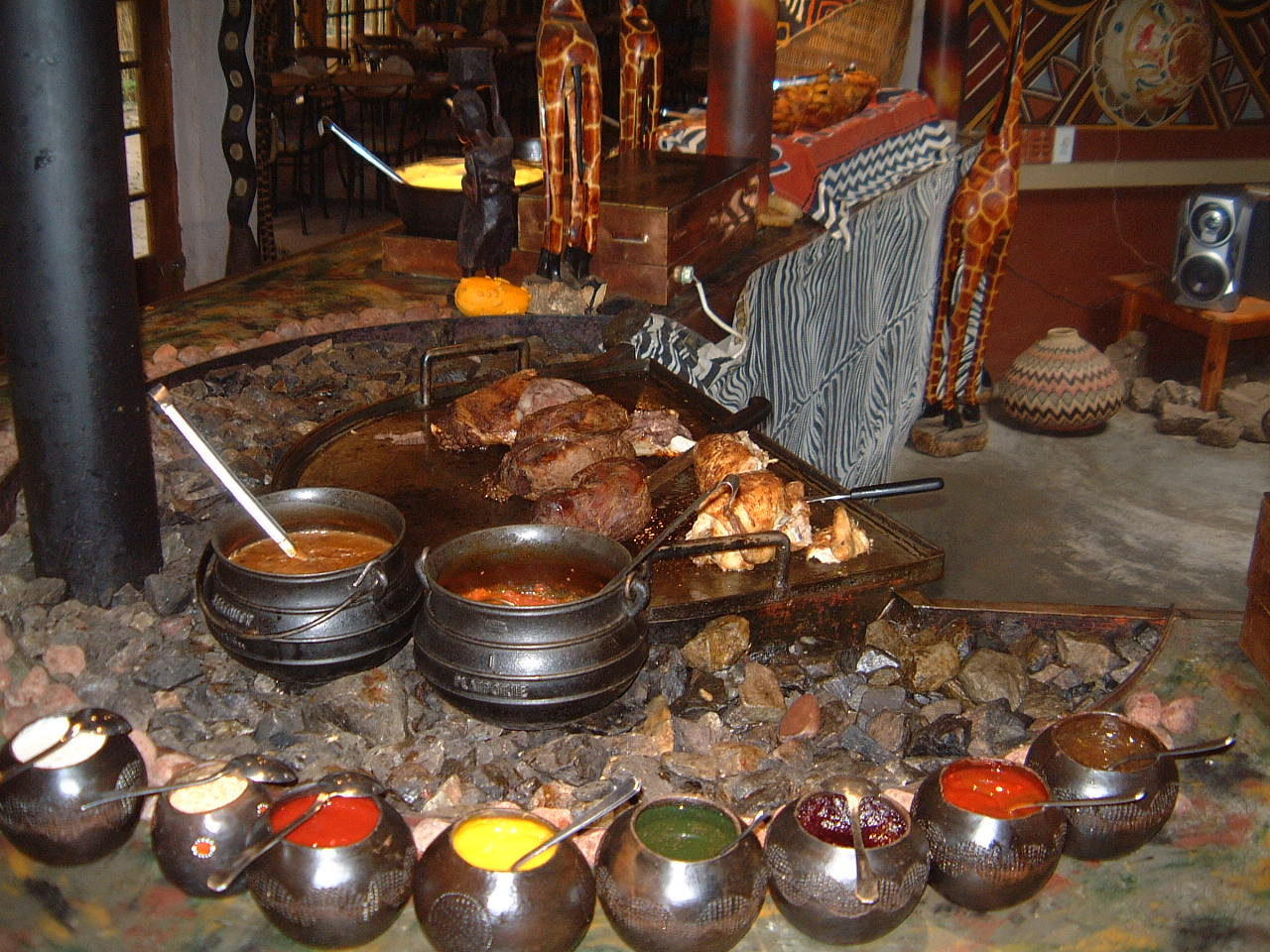
Traditional South African cuisine

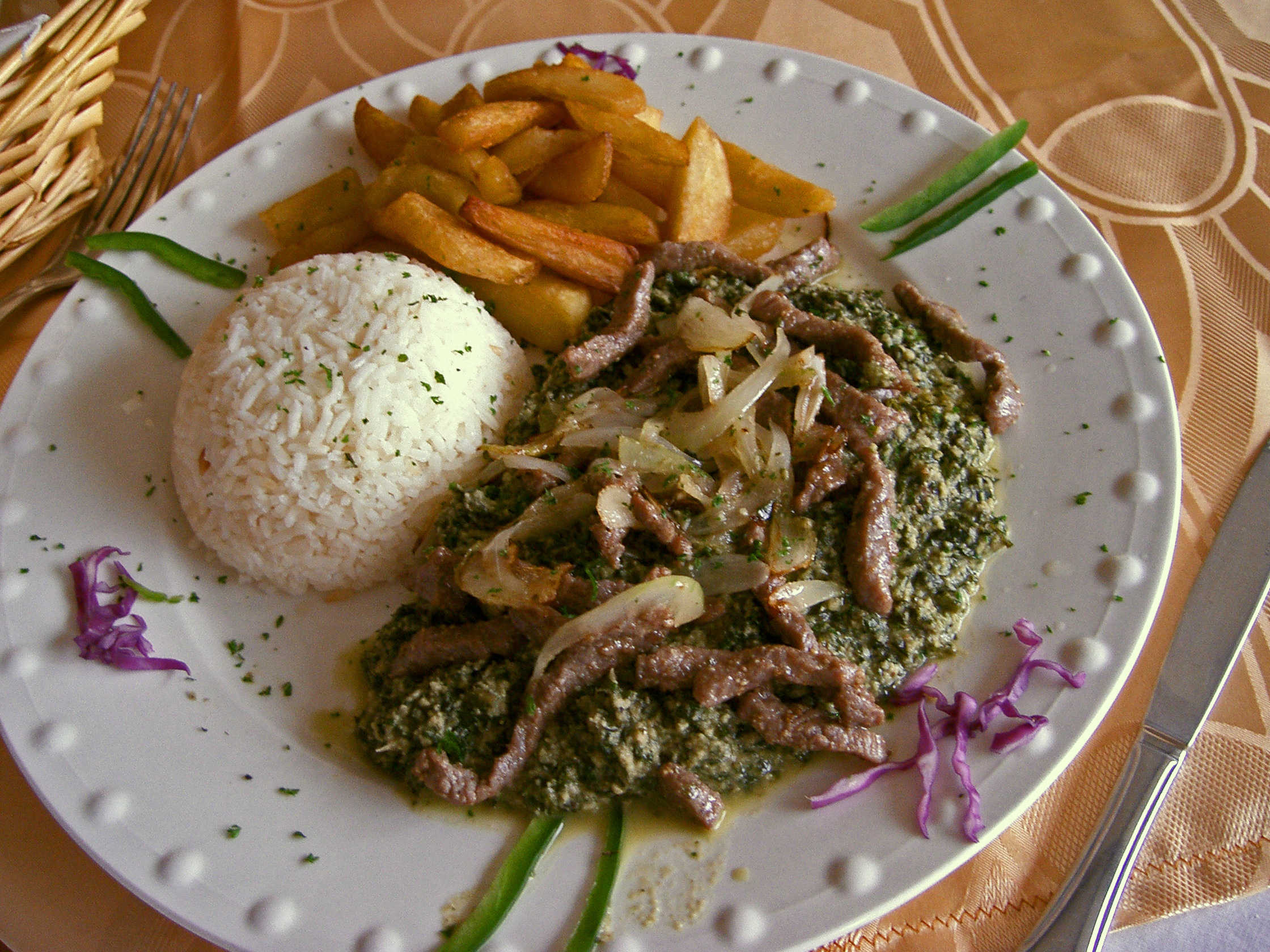
Ndolé is the national dish of Cameroon.

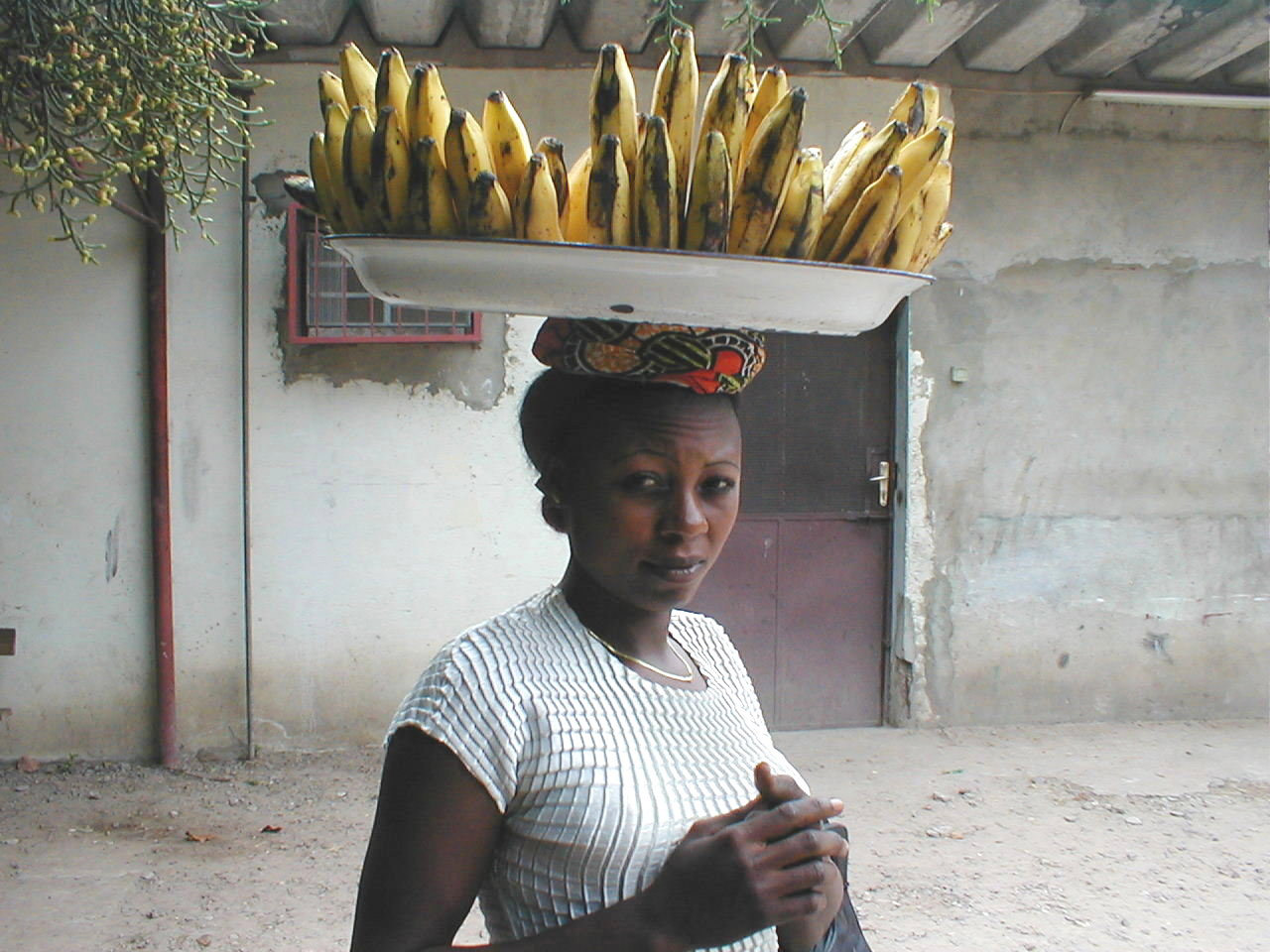
A woman carrying bananas in the Democratic Republic of the Congo

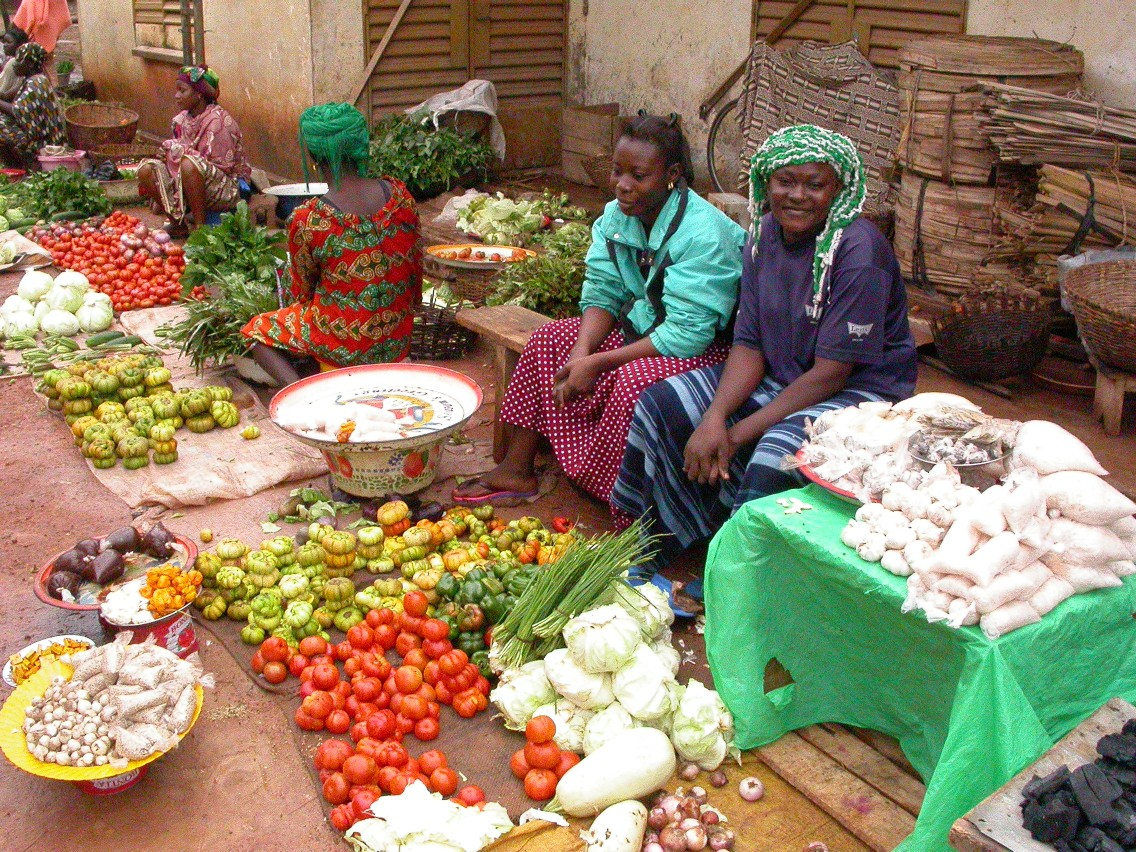
Central market of Léo, Burkina Faso

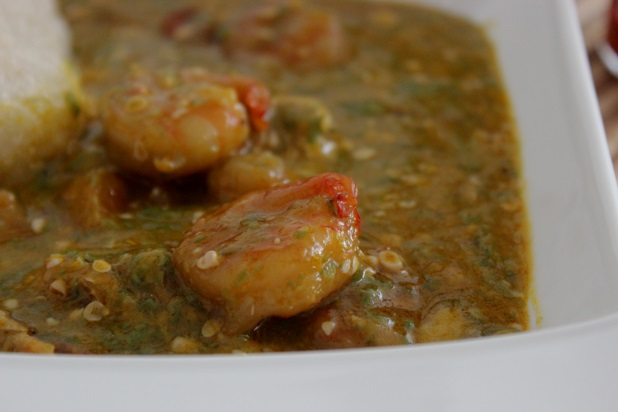
Okra soup, Cameroon

== By country ==
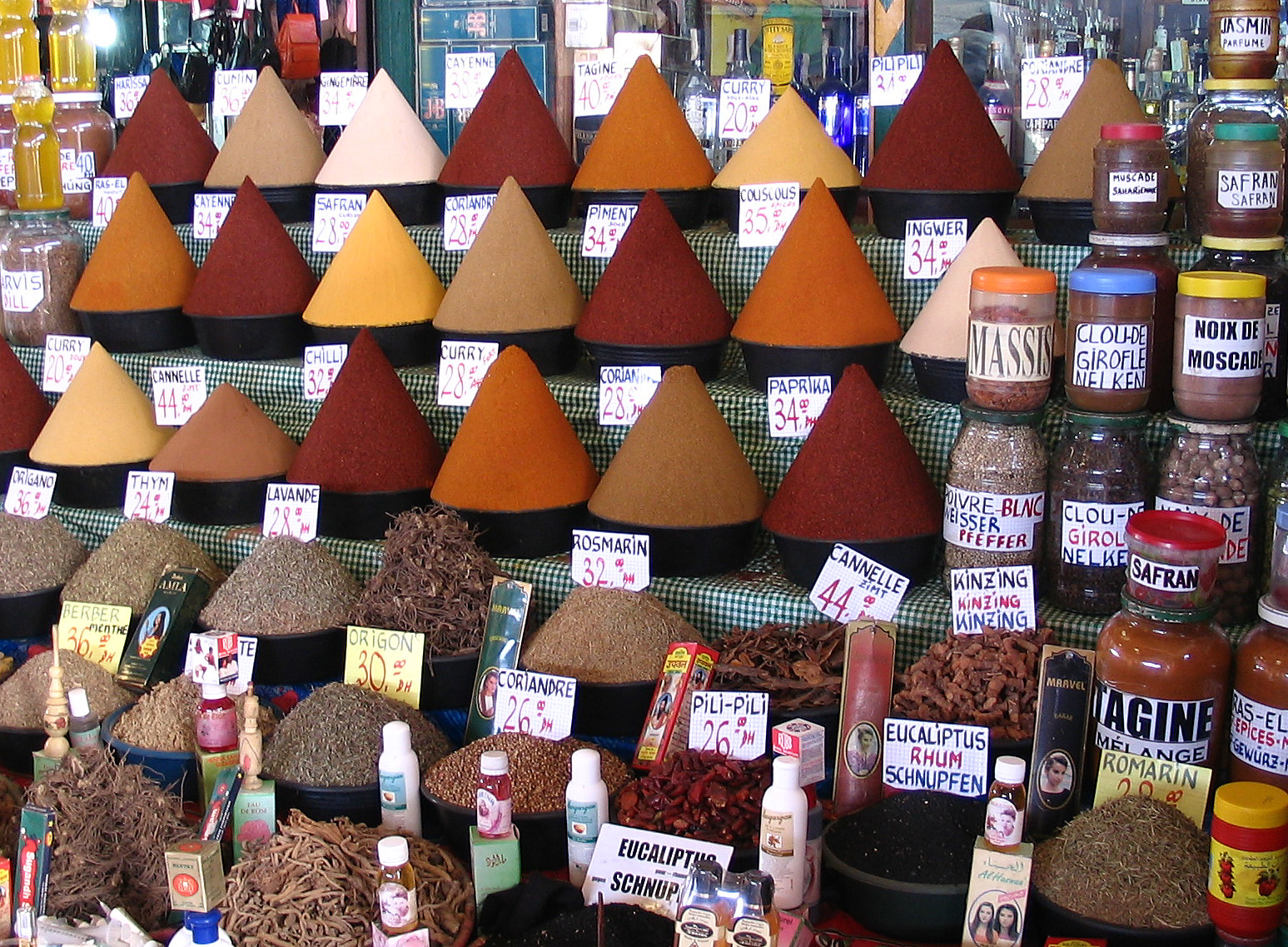
Spices at central market in Agadir, Morocco

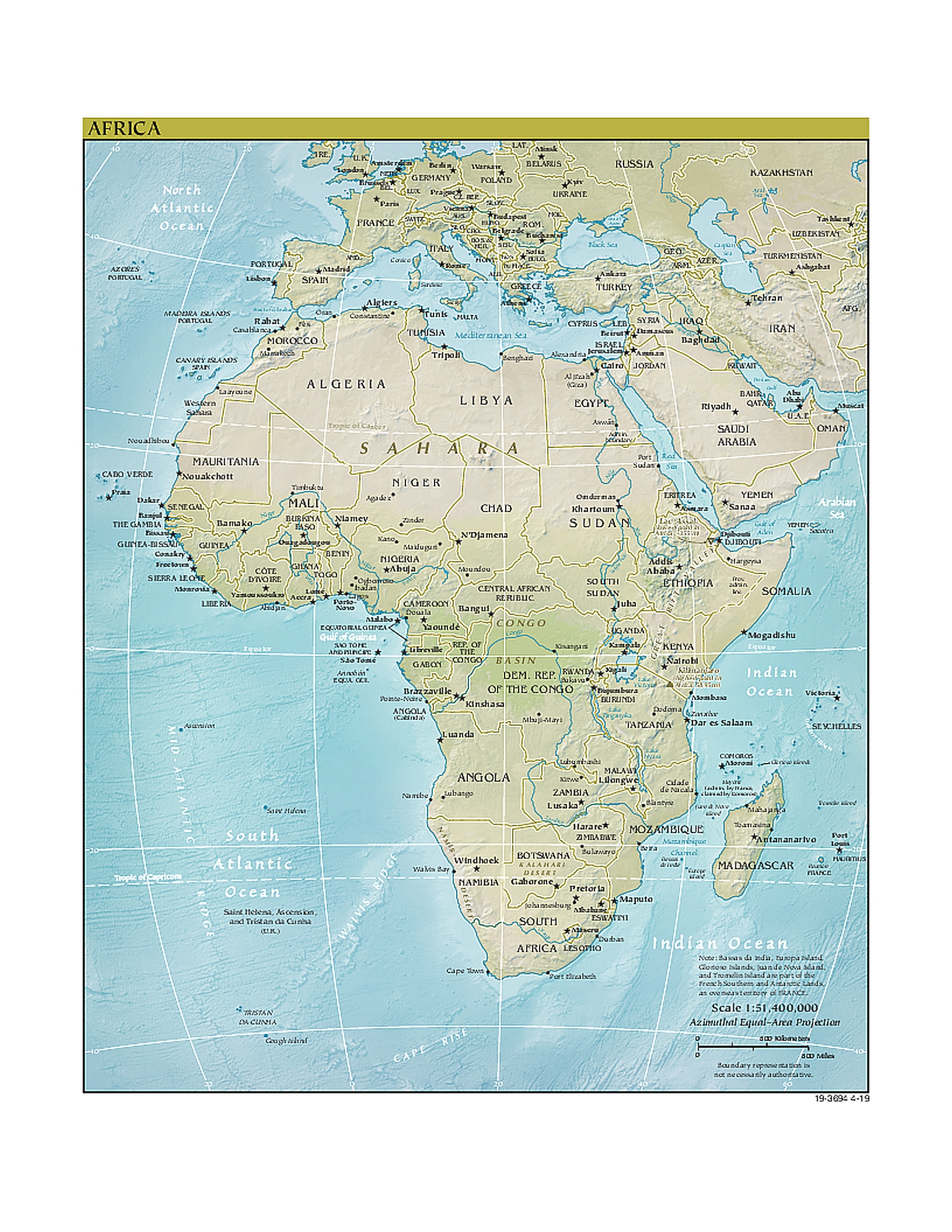
A map of Africa

- North African cuisine

- Algerian cuisine
- Canarian cuisine
- Egyptian cuisine
- Libyan cuisine
- Moroccan cuisine
- Sudanese cuisine
- Tunisian cuisine
- Western Saharan cuisine

- East African cuisine

- Burundian cuisine
- Djiboutian cuisine
- Eritrean cuisine
- Ethiopian cuisine

- Ethiopian Jewish cuisine

- Kenyan cuisine
- Rwandan cuisine is based on local staple foods produced by the traditional subsistence-level agriculture and has historically varied between the country's different ethnic groups.
- Somali cuisine
- South Sudanese cuisine
- Tanzanian cuisine

- Zanzibari cuisine

- Ugandan cuisine

- Central African cuisine

- Angolan cuisine is the cuisine of Angola, a country in south-central Africa. Because Angola was a Portuguese colony for centuries, Portuguese cuisine has significantly influenced Angolan cuisine, with many foods imported into Angola by the Portuguese.
- Cameroonian cuisine
- Centrafrican cuisine is the cooking traditions, practices, foods and dishes associated with the Central African Republic. The diet is heavy on staple starches such as millet and sorghum, and utilizes a significant amount of vegetables and sauces.
- Chadian cuisine is the cooking traditions, practices, foods and dishes associated with the Republic of Chad. Chadians utilize a variety of grains, vegetables, fruits and meats. Commonly consumed grains include millet, sorghum and rice as staple foods.
- Congolese cuisine
- Equatorial Guinean cuisine
- Gabonese cuisine is the cooking traditions, practices, foods and dishes associated with the sovereign state of Gabon. French cuisine is prevalent as a notable influence, and in larger cities various French specialties are available. In rural areas, food staples such as cassava, rice and yams are commonly used.
- São Tomé and Príncipe cuisine

- Southern African cuisine

- Botswana cuisine
- Comorian cuisine
- Eswatini cuisine is largely determined by the seasons and the geographical region. Staple foods in Eswatini include sorghum and maize, often served with goat meat, a very popular livestock there.
- Cuisine of Lesotho
- Malagasy cuisine encompasses the many diverse culinary traditions of the Indian Ocean island of Madagascar.
- Malawian cuisine
- Mauritian cuisine
- Mozambican cuisine - Present for nearly 500 years, the Portuguese greatly impacted the cuisine of Mozambique. Crops such as cassava (a starchy root) and cashew nuts (Mozambique was once the largest producer of these nuts), and pãozinho (pronounced pow-zing-yo; Portuguese-style bread rolls) were brought in by the Portuguese.
- Namibian cuisine
- Seychellois cuisine
- South African cuisine
- Zambian cuisine - The Zambian staple diet is based on maize. It is normally eaten as a thick porridge, called nshima (Nyanja word), prepared from maize flour commonly known as mealie meal. This may be eaten with a variety of vegetables, beans, meat, fish or sour milk depending on geographical location/origin.
- Zimbabwean cuisine

- West African cuisine

- Benin cuisine is known in Africa for its and exotic ingredients and flavorful dishes. Beninese cuisine involves many fresh meals served with a variety of sauces. Meat is usually quite expensive, and meals are generally light on meat and generous on vegetable fat.
- Burkinabe cuisine
- Cape Verdean cuisine - The Cape Verde diet is mostly based on fish and staple foods like corn and rice. Vegetables available during most of the year are potatoes, onions, tomatoes, manioc, cabbage, kale, and dried beans. Fruits such as banana and papayas are available year-round, while others like mangos and avocados are seasonal.
- Gambian cuisine
- Ghanaian cuisine
- Guinean cuisine
- Guinea-Bissauan cuisine
- Ivorian cuisine
- Liberian cuisine
- Malian cuisine
- Mauritanian cuisine
- Nigerian cuisine
- The Nigerien cuisine reflects many traditional African cuisines, and a significant amount of spices are used in dishes. Grilled meats, seasonal vegetables, salads and various sauces are some of the foods consumed.
- Saint Helenian cuisine
- Senegalese cuisine
- Sierra Leonean cuisine
- Togolese cuisine is the cuisine of the Togolese Republic, a country in Western Africa. It is often a combination of African, French and German cuisines. The cuisine has many sauces and pâtés, many of which are made from eggplant, tomato, spinach and fish.

== See also ==
- List of African dishes
- List of cuisines
