= African cuisine =

African cuisine is an integral part of the continent's diverse cultures, reflecting its long and complex history. The evolution of African cuisine is closely entwined with the lives of the native people, influenced by their religious practices, climate and local agriculture. Early African societies were largely composed of hunter-gatherers who relied on foraging for wild fruits, vegetables, nuts, and hunting animals for sustenance. As agriculture developed across the continent, there was a gradual shift to a more settled lifestyle with the cultivation of crops such as millet, sorghum, and later maize. Agriculture also brought about a change in diet, leading to the development of a variety of culinary traditions which vary by religion. Many African traditional dishes are based on plant- and seed-based diets.

Each region in Africa has developed its own distinctive culinary practices, shaped by local ingredients, colonial history and trade. In West Africa, for example, dishes often feature rice, millet, and beans complemented by spicy stews made with fish, meat, and leafy greens. The use of chili peppers, peanuts and palm oil is also widespread in this region. Central African cuisine on the other hand, tends to be simpler and relies heavily on starchy foods such as cassava and plantains, often served with sauces made with peanuts or vegetables. In East Africa, particularly in countries like Kenya, Tanzania, and Uganda, the cuisine reflects a combination of native agricultural practices and influences from trade routes with India and the Middle East. Staples such as maize, beans, and rice are commonly consumed along with dishes like Ugali (a maize-based porridge) and sukuma wiki (a dish made from collard greens). The coastal areas of East Africa, particularly along the Swahili coast, feature seafood and curries seasoned with spices such as cardamom and cloves, a direct influence of Indian and Arab traders. Southern African cuisine also displays a blend of indigenous ingredients and colonial influences. Dishes such as pap (a maize-based porridge) and biltong (a type of sausage) are popular in countries like South Africa, Botswana, and Namibia. The cuisine is characterized by the use of game meat, maize, and beans, as well as European influences introduced during colonial times. Traditionally, the various cuisines of Africa use a combination of plant-and seed-based ingredients, without having food imported. In some parts of the continent, the traditional diet features an abundance of root tuber products.

Africa represents a rich history of adaptation, trade, and resourcefulness. while regional differences are pronounced, the use of local ingredients and traditional cooking techniques remains central to the continent's culinary identity. Central Africa, East Africa, North Africa, Southern Africa and West Africa each have distinctive dishes, preparation techniques, and consumption modes.

== History ==
The roots of native African cuisine goes back to thousands of years before the Bronze Age in Northeast Africa, when early civilizations began cultivating grains such as barley and wheat. Part of North Africa is in the Fertile Crescent where settled agriculture was practiced by the Ancient Egyptians in this area. Animals such as donkeys and sheep were also domesticated, starting the spread of agriculture to other parts of Africa, notably West Africa. Although most tribes still lived a simple hunter-gather diet.

Arab explorers- Leo Africanus and Ibn Battuta- provided accounts of African food which they encountered on their travels through sub-Saharan Africa. Most European travelers stayed close to coastal areas until the 19th century. Many of their diaries also recorded details on foods and crops. Many staples were introduced later when Africa was colonized by the Europeans. Foods that are now important parts of African cuisine such as maize and potatoes were not common until the 19th century.

The influence of African food on Caribbean, Brazilian, American Lowcountry cuisine, and Cajun cuisine from Louisiana is seen in rice dishes and green stews like the Afro-Caribbean efo, duckanoo and callaloo. The vegetable okra, introduced from Africa, is used in classic Louisiana gumbos, and American rice growing in the Carolina. Lowcountry was influenced by West African techniques of rice cultivation and many slaves hailed from the rice-growing regions of West Africa. Lowcountry cuisine is still known for its distinctive rice dishes.

== Central Africa ==
Central Africa expands from the Tibesti Mountains in the north to the vast rainforest basin of the Congo River, the highlands of Kivu and the savannah of Katanga.

This region has received the culinary influence of the Swahilis (culture that evolved via the combination of Bantu, Yemeni, Omani and Indian cultures) during the trans-Saharan slave trade. Swahili culinary influences can be found in dishes such as mandazi, pilaf rice, kachumbari, sambusa, and kuku paka.

Central African cuisine has also been influenced by the Portuguese, by way of the Kongo and Ndongo Kingdoms. Salt fish was introduced following trade in the late 17th century, and the Kikongo term for salt fish, makayabu, comes from the Portuguese term bacalhau.

The Portuguese culinary influence is especially prominent in Angola, Sao Tomé and Equatorial Guinea. Central Africa has also been influenced by the cuisine of the East, West and Southern Africa regions because of their close proximity, e.g. babuté or bobotie is shared with the south, nyama choma with the east and sauce gombo with West Africa.

In Central Africa, a variety of crops are grown, including yams, cassava, bananas and plantains, sweet potatoes, and cocoyams. These crops have become staples in the diet of many people in Central Africa. Fufu-like starchy foods are usually made from fermented cassava roots, but they can also be made with plantain, corn maize and yam. Fufu is served buffet-style with grilled meat, fish, stews, greens and piment. A variety of local ingredients are used while preparing other dishes, like spinach stew cooked with tomato, peppers, chilies, onions, and peanut butter. Eastern central Africa is also one of the few regions in Africa that uses potatoes as one of its main bases, since potatoes grow easily in the region.

Cassava plants are also consumed as cooked greens. Groundnut (peanut) stew is also prepared, containing chicken, okra, ginger, and other spices. Beef and chicken are favorite meat dishes, but game meat preparations containing crocodile, elephant, antelope and warthog meats are also served occasionally.

=== Countries ===
- Angolan cuisine
- Cameroonian cuisine
- Cuisine of the Central African Republic
- Chadian cuisine
- Congolese cuisine
- Cuisine of Equatorial Guinea
- Gabonese cuisine
- Cuisine of São Tomé and Príncipe

== East Africa ==
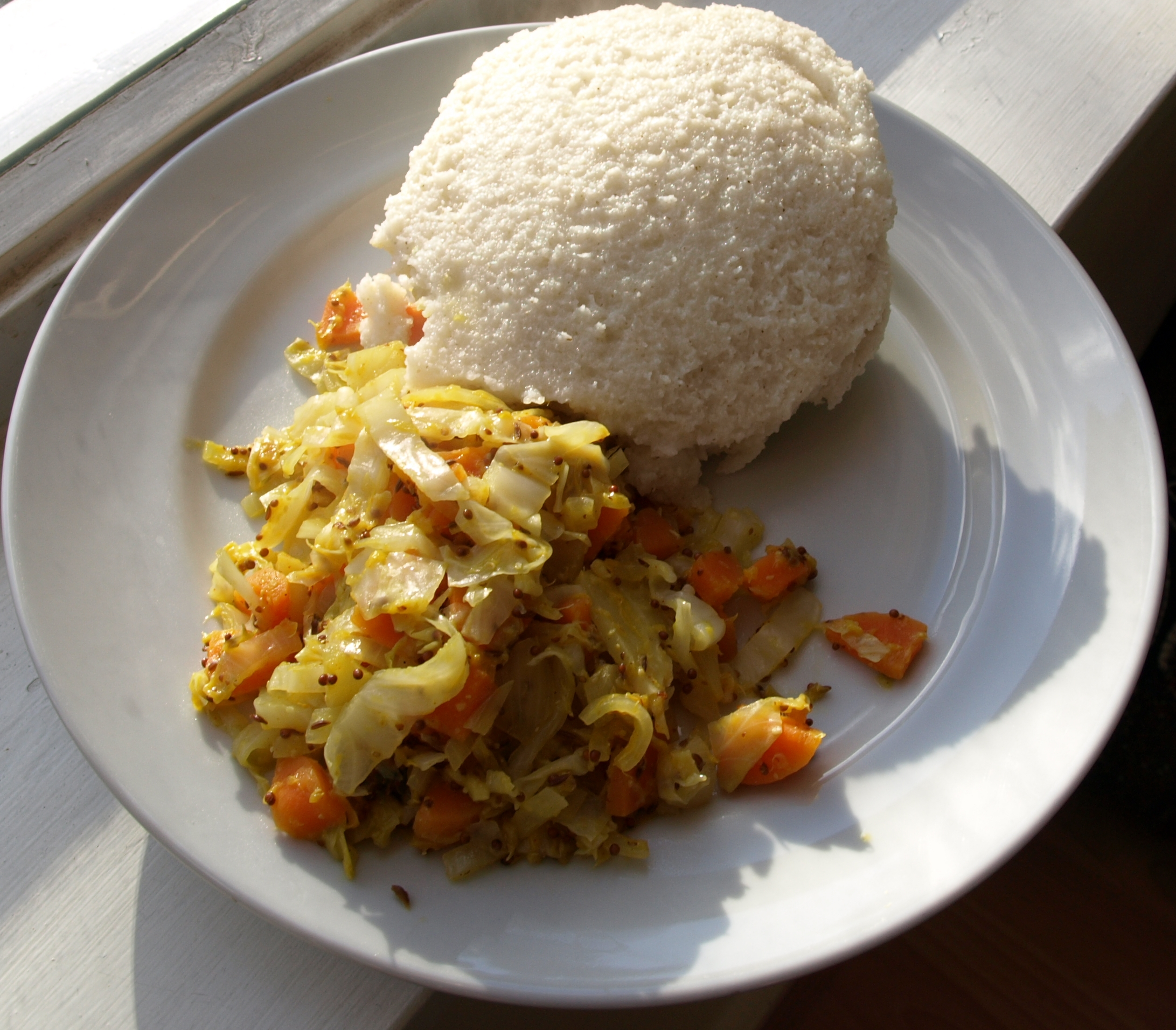
Ugali, pictured here with a side dish of cabbage, though it is more typically eaten with collard greens (sukuma wiki)

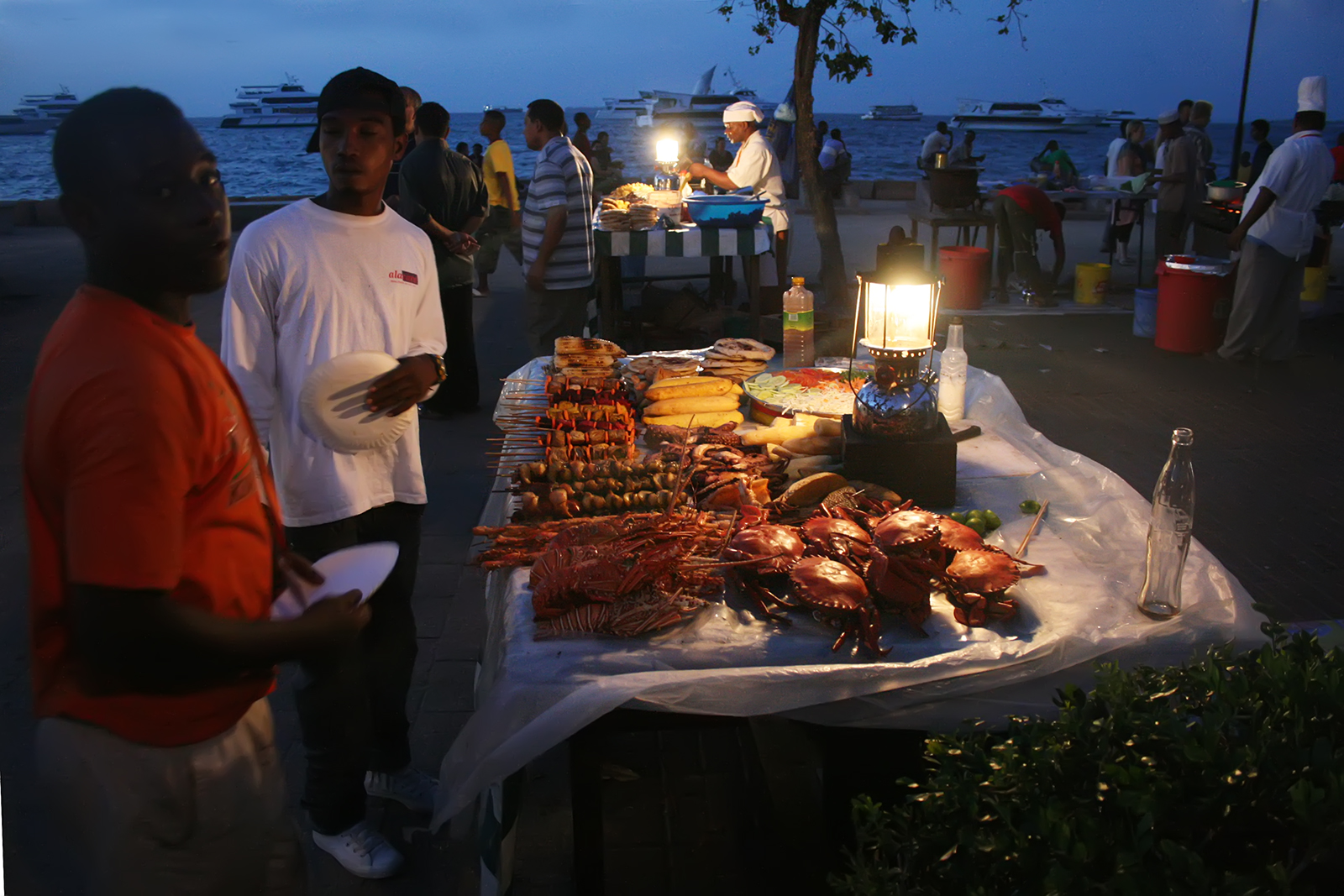
Barbecued beef cubes and seafood in Forodhani Gardens, Zanzibar

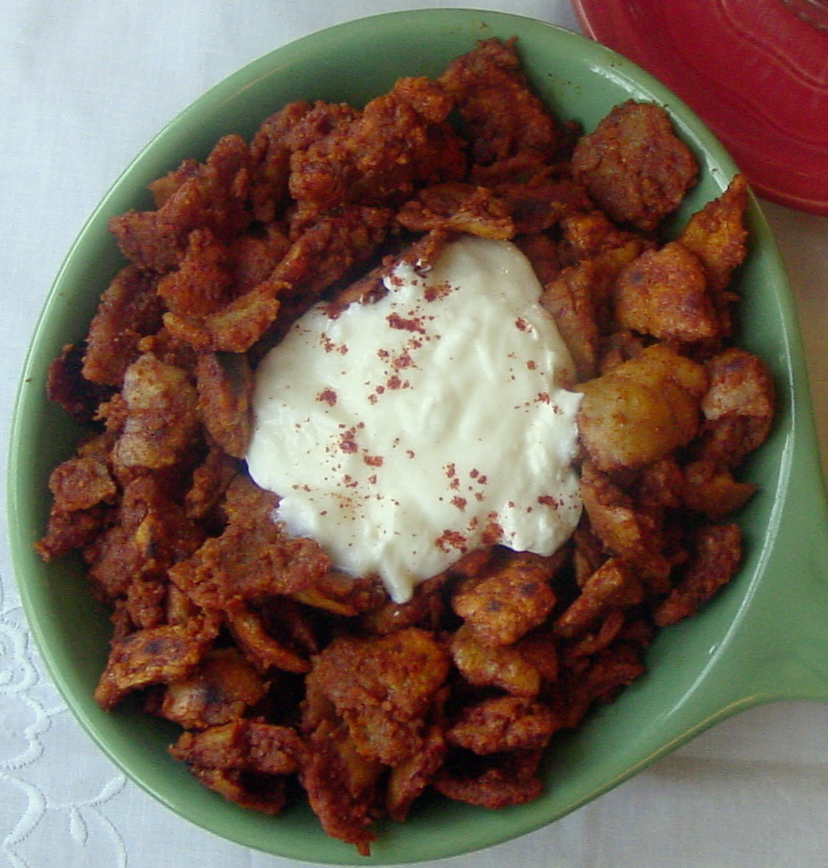
Kitcha fit-fit, a mainstay in Ethiopian cuisine, is presented with a scoop of fresh yoghurt and topped with berbere (spice).

The cuisine of East Africa varies from area to area. In the inland savannah, the traditional cuisine of cattle-keeping peoples is distinctive meaning that meat products are generally absent. Cattle, sheep, pigs and goats were regarded as a form of currency and a store of wealth. They are not generally consumed as food.

In some areas, traditional East Africans consume the milk and blood of cattle, but rarely the meat. Elsewhere, other Africans are farmers who grow a variety of grains and vegetables. Maize (corn) is the basis of ugali', the local version of West and Central Africa's fufu. Ugali is a starch dish eaten with meats or stews. In Uganda, steamed green bananas called matoke provide the starch filler of many meals.

Around 1000 years ago, Omani and Yemeni merchants settled on the Swahili Coast. Middle Eastern influences are especially reflected in the Swahili cuisine of the coast—steamed or cooked rice with spices in Persian style; saffron, cloves, cinnamon and several other spices; and pomegranate juice.

Several centuries later, the British and the Indians came, and both brought with them foods such as Indian spiced vegetable curries, lentil soups, chapattis and a variety of pickles which have influenced various local dishes. Some common ingredients used in this region include oranges, lemons, limes, chilies, capsicum peppers, maize, tomatoes, and strawberries.

In the Horn of Africa, the main traditional dishes in Eritrean cuisine and Ethiopian cuisine are tsebhis (stews) served with injera (flatbread made from teff, wheat, or sorghum) and hilbet (paste made from legumes, mainly lentils and fava beans). Eritrean and Ethiopian cuisine (especially in the northern half) are very similar, given the shared history of the two countries.

Eritrean and Ethiopian food habits vary regionally. In the highlands, injera is the staple diet and is eaten daily among the Tigrinya. Injera is made out of teff, wheat, barley, sorghum or corn, and resembles a spongy, slightly sour pancake. When eating, diners generally share food from a large tray placed in the center of a low dining table. Many injera are layered on this tray and topped with various spicy stews. Diners then break into the section of injera in front of them, tearing off pieces and dipping them into the stews.

In the lowlands, the main dish is akelet, a porridge-like dish made from wheat flour dough. A ladle is used to scoop out the top, which is filled with berbere and butter sauce and surrounded by milk or yoghurt. A small piece of dough is broken and then used to scoop up the sauce.

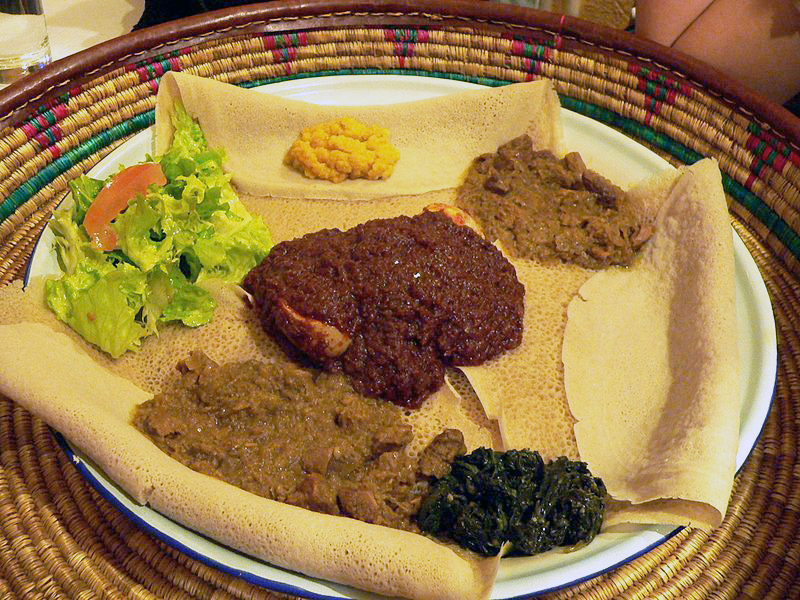
Typical Ethiopian and Eritrean cuisine: Injera (pancake-like bread) and several kinds of'"wat" (stew)

The best known Ethiopian/Eritrean cuisine consists of various vegetable or meat side dishes and entrées, usually a wat, or thick stew, served atop injera, a large sourdough flatbread made of teff flour. One does not eat with utensils, but instead uses injera to scoop up the entrées and side dishes.

Tihlo, prepared from roasted barley flour, is very popular in Amhara, Agame, and Awlaelo (Tigray). Traditional Ethiopian cuisine employs no pork or shellfish of any kind, as they are forbidden in the Jewish and Ethiopian Orthodox Christian faiths. It is also very common to eat from the same dish in the center of the table with a group of people.

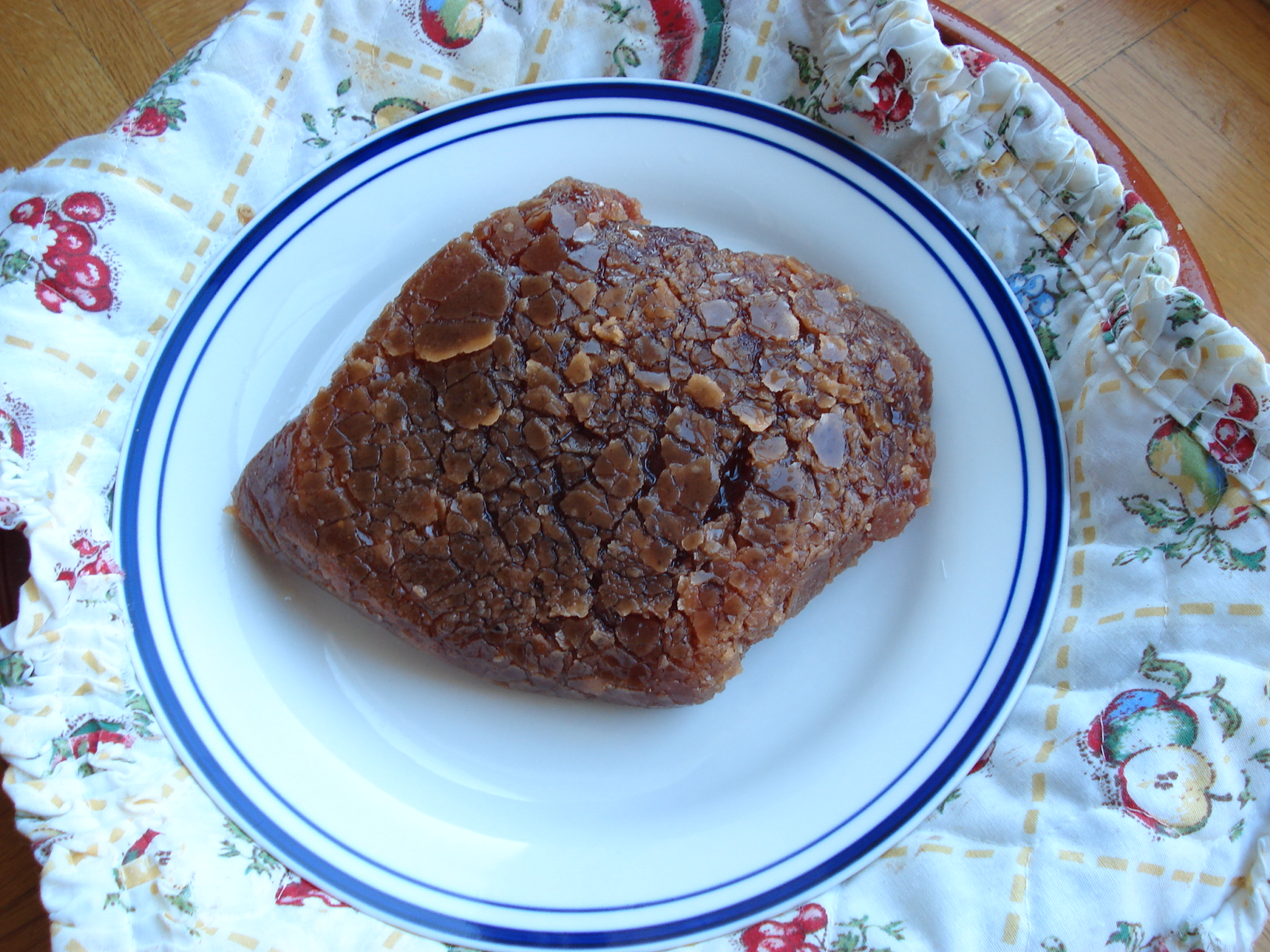
Xalwo, the Somali version of halva, is a festive dish in Somali cuisine.

Somali cuisine varies from region to region and consists of an exotic mixture of diverse culinary influences. It is the product of Somalia's rich tradition of trade and commerce. Despite the variety, there remains one thing that unites the various regional cuisines: all food is served halal. There are therefore no pork dishes, alcohol is not served, nothing that died on its own is eaten, and no blood is incorporated. Qaddo or lunch is often elaborate.

Varieties of bariis (rice), the most popular being basmati, usually serve as the main dish. Spices like cumin, cardamom, cloves, cinnamon and sage are used to aromatize these different rice dishes. Somalis serve dinner as late as 9 pm. During Ramadan, dinner is often served after Tarawih prayers, sometimes as late as 11 pm.

Xalwo (halwo) or halva is a popular confection served during special occasions such as Eid celebrations or wedding receptions. It is made from sugar, cornstarch, cardamom powder, nutmeg powder, and ghee. Peanuts are also sometimes added to enhance texture and flavor. After meals, homes are traditionally perfumed using frankincense (lubaan) or incense (cuunsi), which is prepared inside an incense burner referred to as a dabqaad.

Food and nutrition security in East Africa (Rwanda, Burundi and South Sudan) is a significant issue. The region has been plagued by drought, conflict and economic instability since the 1990s. The current situation is characterized by low levels of food availability and high levels of malnutrition among young children. The solution proposed for this problem is to increase local food production. This would be achieved by increasing agricultural productivity by improving soil fertility and water management, which will help farmers grow more crops per year. This will also help reduce poverty in the region by providing more employment opportunities for local people.

== North Africa ==
In a study of food loss and waste in North Africa, researchers found that the region was wasting about 30% of its food, which is likely to increase as the population continues to grow. This waste occurs for a variety of reasons, including lack of refrigeration and storage facilities. To solve this issue, the people had to get creative with new dishes and ways of storing food. The more we looked, the more we found that people were using all parts of plants in some way—the leaves, stems, flowers, fruits and seeds. They also used every edible part of animals as well—from fat to bones for making broth or soup.

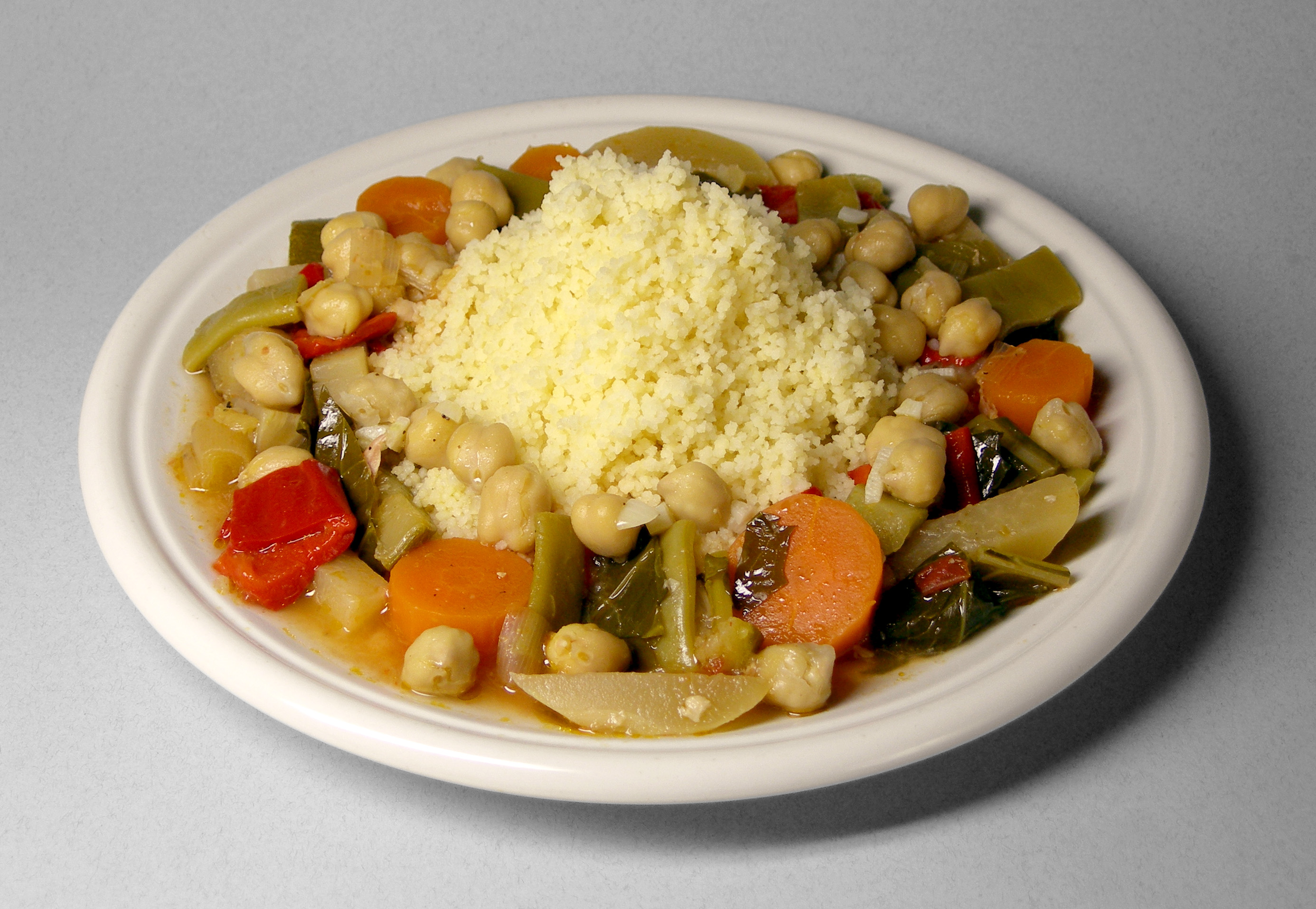
Fresh couscous with vegetables and chickpeas

North Africa lies along the Mediterranean Sea and encompasses within its fold several nations, including Morocco, Algeria, Libya, Tunisia, and Egypt. The roots of North African cuisine can be traced back to the ancient empires of North Africa, particularly in Egypt, where many of the country's dishes and culinary traditions date back to African antiquity.

Over several centuries traders, travelers, invaders, migrants and immigrants all have influenced the cuisine of North Africa. The Phoenicians of the 1st century brought sausages, while the Carthaginians introduced wheat and its by-product, semolina. The Berbers adapted semolina into couscous, one of the main staple foods. Olives and olive oil were introduced before the arrival of the Romans.

From the 7th century onwards, the Arabs introduced a variety of spices, like saffron, nutmeg, cinnamon, ginger and cloves, which contributed and influenced the culinary culture of North Africa. The Ottoman Turks brought sweet pastries and other bakery products, and from the New World, North Africa got potatoes, tomatoes, zucchini and chili peppers.

Most of the North African countries have several similar dishes, sometimes almost the same dish with a different name (the Moroccan tangia and the Tunisian coucha are both essentially the same dish, a meat stew prepared in an urn and cooked overnight in a public oven), sometimes with a slight change in ingredients and cooking style. In addition, two completely different dishes may also share the same name (for example, a tajine dish is a slow-cooked stew in Morocco, whereas the Tunisian tajine is a baked omelette/quiche-like dish). There are noticeable differences between the cooking styles of different nations, from the sophisticated, full-bodied flavors of Moroccan palace cookery to the fiery dishes of Tunisian cuisine and the humbler, simpler cuisines of Egypt and Algeria.

== Southern Africa ==
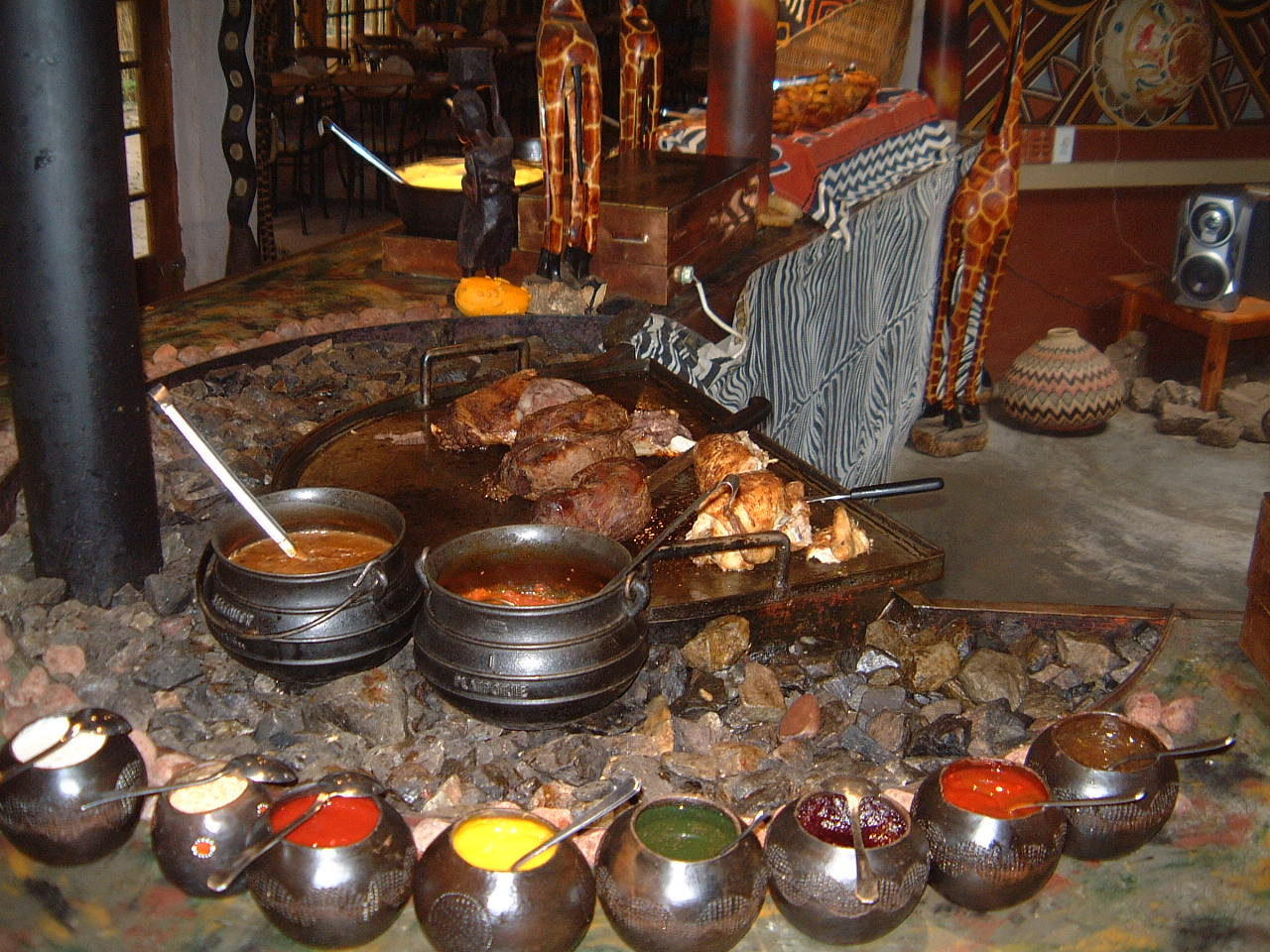
Traditional South African cuisine

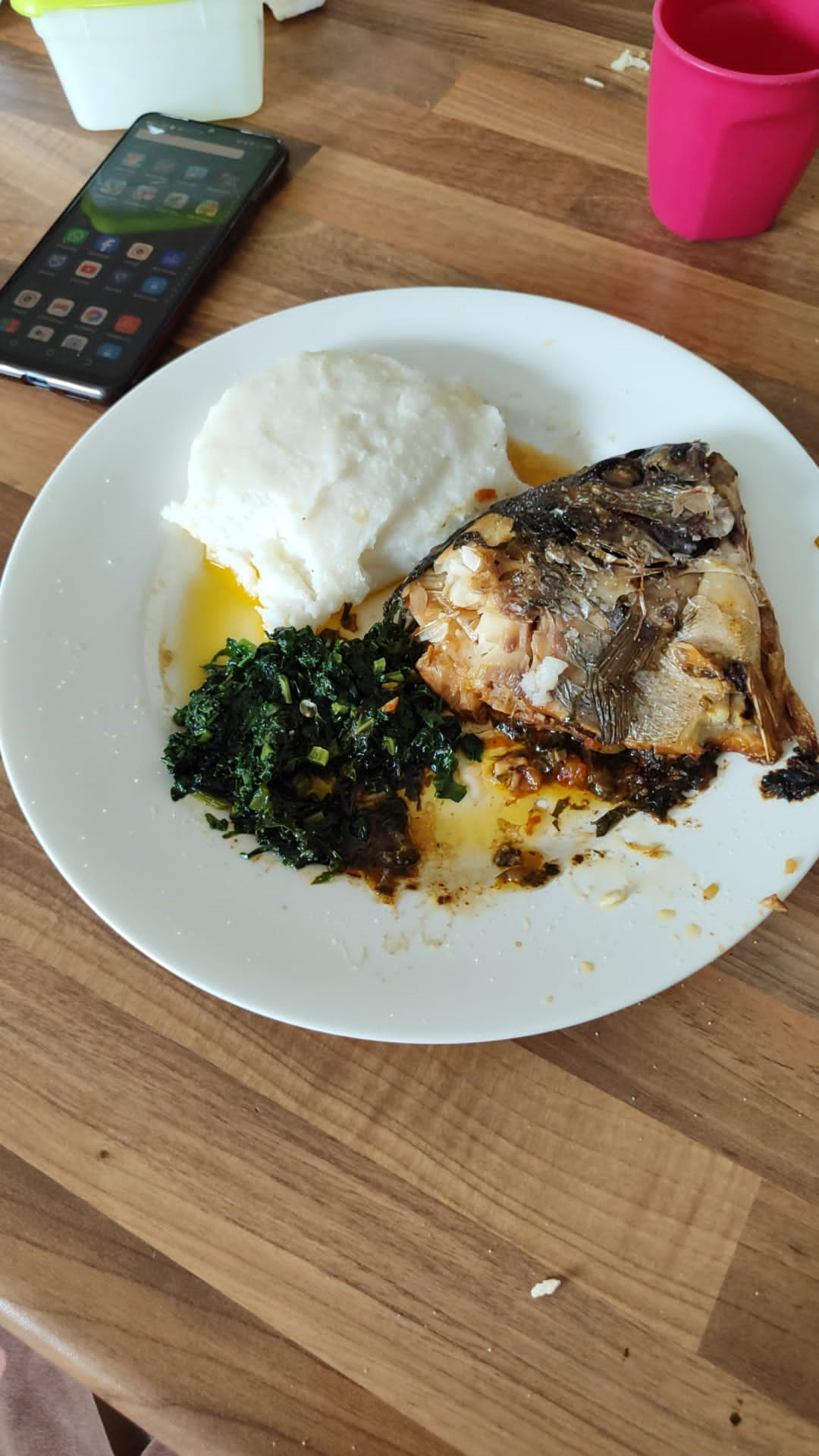
Sadza, fish and vegies

The cooking of the Southern Africa region (not to be confused with the country of South Africa) is sometimes called "rainbow cuisine", as the food in this region is a blend of many cultures: indigenous African societies, European, and Asian. To understand indigenous African cuisine, it is important to understand the various native peoples of southern Africa. The indigenous Africans of Southern Africa were roughly divided into two groups and several subgroups.

The largest group consisted of the Bantu-speakers, whose descendants today may identify themselves by various subgroup names such as Ndebele (northern and southern), Shona, Venda, Zulu, Xhosa, Swazi, Sotho, Tswana, Pedi and Tsonga. They arrived in the region around 2,000 years ago, bringing crop cultivation, animal husbandry, and iron toolmaking with them. Hence the Bantu-speakers grew grain crops extensively and raised cattle, sheep and goats. They also grew and continue to grow pumpkins, beans, and leafy greens as vegetables.

A smaller group were the primeval residents of the region, the Khoisan, who some archaeologists believe had lived in the region for at least 10,000 years. Many descendants of the Khoisan people have now been incorporated into the population of South Africa. The Khoisan originally were hunter-gatherers (who came to be known as "San" by the Bantu-speakers and as "bushmen" by Europeans). After the arrival of the Bantu-speakers, however, some Khoisan adopted the Bantu-speakers' raising of cattle but did not grow crops. The Khoisan who raised cattle called themselves "Khoi-Khoi" and came to be known by Europeans as "Hottentots."

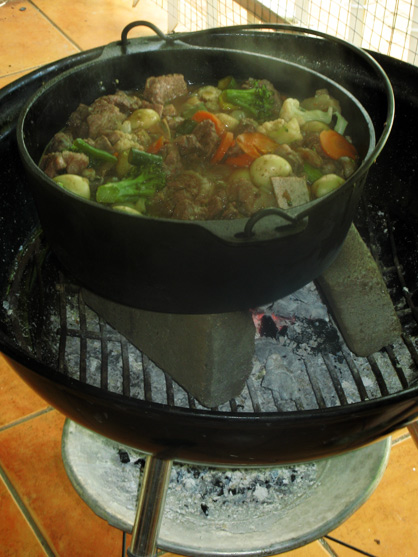
Potjiekos is a traditional African stew (popularised by Afrikaners) made with meat and vegetables and cooked over coals in cast-iron pots.

People were, in other words, defined to some extent by the kinds of food they ate. The Bantu-speakers ate dishes of grain, meat, milk and vegetables, as well as fermented grain and fermented milk products. While the Khoi-Khoi ate meat and milk and the San hunted wild animals and gathered wild tubers and vegetables. In many ways, the daily food of native South African families can be traced to the indigenous foods that their native African ancestors ate. The Khoisan and Bantu traditionally ate roasted meat, and they also dried meat for later use.

The influence of their diet is reflected in the universal Southern African love of barbecue (generally called in South Africa by its Afrikaans name, a "braai") and biltong (dried preserved meat). The traditional beer was ubiquitous in the southern African diet, and the fermentation added additional nutrients to the diet. It was a traditional obligation for any family to be able to offer a visitor copious amounts of beer. Beer brewing was done by women, and the status of a housewife in pre-colonial southern Africa depended significantly on her skill at brewing delicious beer.

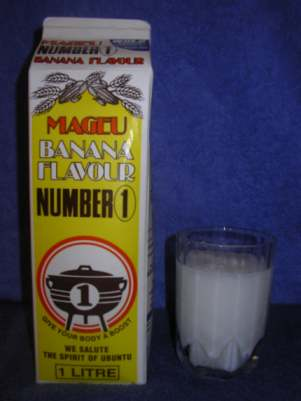
A carton and glass of mageu, a traditional non-alcoholic drink made from fermented mealie pap that is popular among many of the Nguni people

Milk was historically one of the most important components of the southern African diet. Cattle were considered a man's most important possession. In order to marry, a man had to compensate his prospective in-laws with a gift of cattle as a dowry for his bride. A married man was expected to provide a generous supply of milk to his wife and children, along with meat whenever he slaughtered cattle, sheep or goats. Because there was no refrigeration, milk was mostly soured into a kind of yogurt.

The young men of the family often took care of the cattle far away from the villages at "cattle posts," and they sent a steady stream of yogurt home on behalf of their fathers. Today, many South Africans of African origin enjoy drinking sour milk products that are sold in the supermarket, comparable to American buttermilk, yogurt, and sour cream. On weekends they will have a "braai", and the meal usually consists of "pap and vleis", which is maize porridge and grilled meat as has historically been done in the region.

The basic ingredients include seafood, meat products (including wild game), poultry, as well as grains, fresh fruits and vegetables. Fruits include apples, grapes, mangoes, bananas, papayas, avocado, oranges, peaches and apricots. Desserts may simply be fruit, but there are some more western-style puddings, such as malva pudding, reminiscent of sticky toffee pudding, which was inspired by both British cuisine and Dutch cuisine. Meat products include lamb, and game like venison, ostrich, and impala. The seafood includes crayfish, prawns, tuna, mussels, oysters, calamari, mackerel, and lobster. There are also several types of traditional and modern alcoholic beverages including many European-style beers.

=== Notable dishes ===
- Inyama yenhloko

=== Countries ===
- Botswana cuisine
- Cuisine of Eswatini
- Cuisine of Lesotho
- Namibian cuisine
- South African cuisine
- Zimbabwe cuisine
- Mozambican cuisine

== West Africa ==
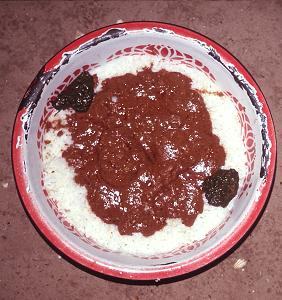
West African maafe or groundnut stew, prepared by a Senegalese cook

A typical West African meal is made with starchy items and can contain meat, fish, as well as various spices and herbs. A wide array of staples are eaten across the region, including fufu, banku, kenkey (originating from Ghana), foutou, couscous, tô, and garri, which are served alongside soups and stews. Fufu is often made from starchy root vegetables such as yams, cocoyams, or cassava, and also from cereal grains like millet, sorghum or plantains.

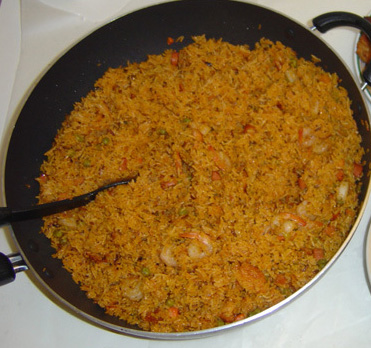
Jollof rice is a popular dish throughout West Africa.

The staple grain or starch varies between regions and ethnic groups, although corn has gained significant ground as it is cheap, swells to greater volumes and creates a beautiful white final product that is greatly desired. Banku and kenkey are maize dough staples, and garri is made from dried grated cassavas. Rice dishes are also widely eaten in the region, especially in the dry Sahel belt inland. Examples of these include the Senegalese dish thieboudienne also known as benachin or Jollof rice, a pan-West African rice dish similar to Arab kabsah.

Seeds of Guinea pepper (Aframomum melegueta, also called grains of paradise or melegueta pepper), a native West African plant, were used as a spice and even reached Europe, through North African middlemen, during the Middle Ages. Centuries before the influence of the Europeans, West Africans were trading with the Arab world and spices like cinnamon, cloves, and mint were not unknown, therefore becoming part of the local flavorings. Centuries later, the Portuguese, French and British influenced the regional cuisines, but only to a limited extent.

The local cuisine and recipes of West Africa continue to remain deeply entrenched in the local customs and traditions, with ingredients like native rice (Oryza glaberrima), rice, fonio, millet, sorghum, Bambara groundnuts and Hausa groundnuts, black-eyed peas, brown beans, and root vegetables such as yams, cocoyams, sweet potatoes, and cassava. Cooking techniques include roasting, baking, boiling, frying, mashing, and spicing. A range of sweets and savories are also prepared.

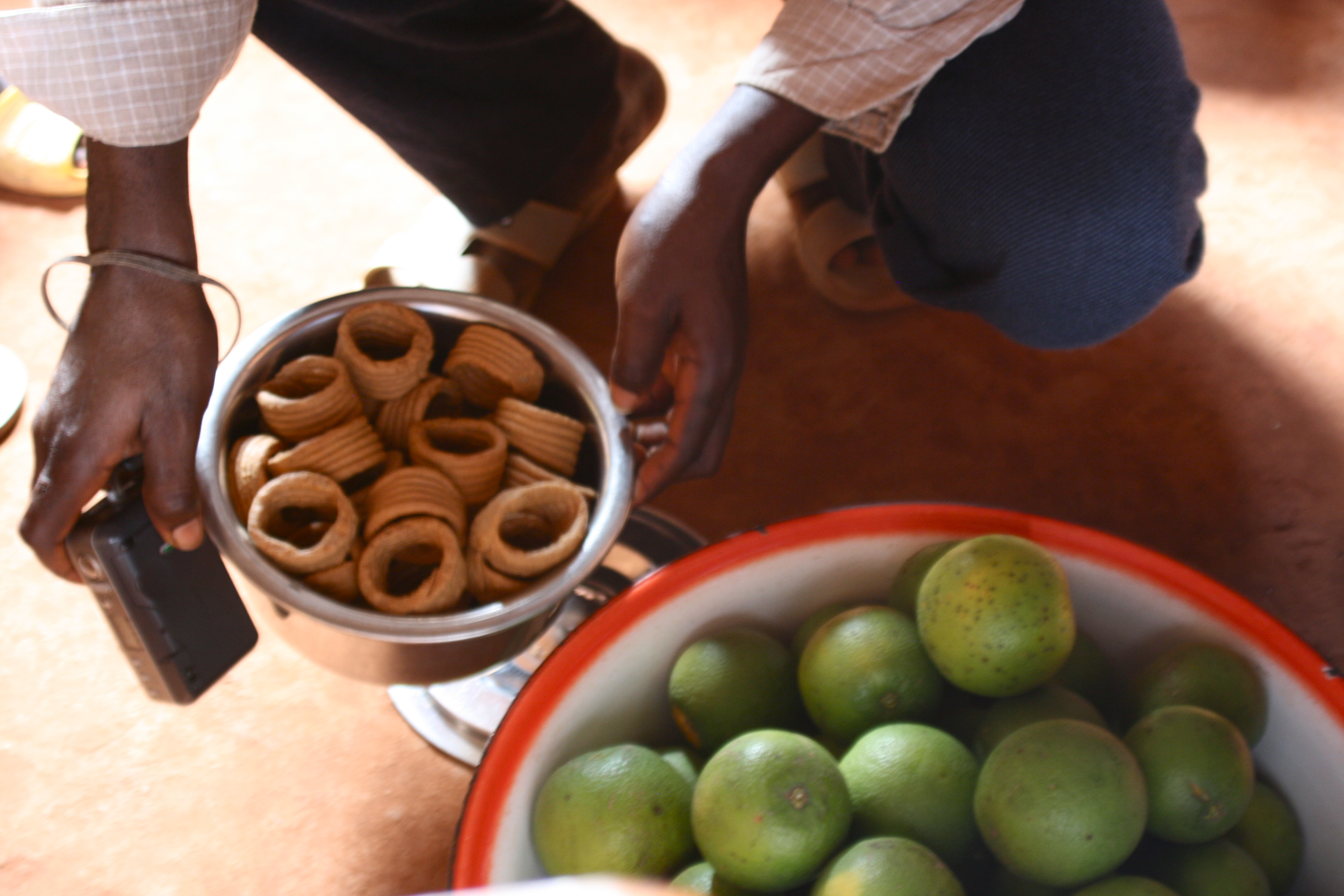
Klouikloui, rings of fried peanut butter as served in Benin

Cooking techniques of West Africa are changing. In the past West Africans ate much less meat and used native oils (palm oil on the coast and shea butter in Sahelian regions). Baobob leaf and numerous local greens were everyday staples during certain times of the year. Today the diet is much heavier in meats, salt, and fats. Many dishes combine fish and meat, including dried and fermented fish. Flaked and dried fish is often fried in oil, and sometimes cooked in sauce made with hot peppers, onions, tomatoes, various spices (such as soumbala), and water to prepare a highly flavored stew.

In some areas beef and mutton are preferred, and goat meat is the dominant red meat. Suya, a popular grilled spicy meat kebab flavored with peanuts and other spices, is sold by street vendors as a snack or evening meal and is typically made with beef or chicken. It is common to have a preponderance of seafood, which as earlier stated, is sometimes also mixed with other meat products. Guinea fowl and chicken eggs are also preferred.

With regard to beverages, water has a very strong ritual significance in many West African nations (particularly in dry areas) and water is often the first thing an African host will offer their guest. Palm wine is also a common beverage made from the fermented sap of various types of palm trees and is usually sold in sweet (less-fermented, retaining more of the sap's sugar) or sour (fermented longer, making it stronger and less sweet) varieties. Millet beer is another common beverage (Millet beer, also known as Bantu beer, is an alcoholic beverage made from malted millet.)

=== Countries ===
- Benin cuisine
- Burkinabé cuisine, Burkina Faso
- Ghanaian cuisine
- Cuisine of Guinea-Bissau
- Cuisine of Guinea
- Ivorian cuisine
- Liberian cuisine
- Malian cuisine
- Mauritanian cuisine
- Nigerian cuisine
- Cuisine of Niger
- Cuisine of Saint Helena
- Senegalese cuisine
- Cuisine of Sierra Leone
- Togolese cuisine

Notable Dishes

Bitter Leaf Soup

The exact origins of Bitter Leaf soup appear to be unknown thought it is known to have been prepared and eaten for hundreds of years. The dish traditionally consists of fish, meat (usually beef), bitter leaves, palm oil, and an array of spices and seasonings. Shellfish such as shrimp or crayfish are often used alongside fish in the preparation of Bitter Leaf Soup. Due to the bitterness of bitter leaf, the bitter leaf is washed thoroughly to diminish the bitterness before being cooked with the rest of the ingredients. It is widely consumed in West Africa, especially Nigeria where it is associated with the Igbo people and referred to as Ofe Onugbu.

The Bitter Leaf itself is known scientifically as Vernonia amygdalina and is native to Sub-Saharan Africa. The bitter taste comes from the alkaloids contained within the plant.

== See also ==
- AfroFoodtv.com
- List of African dishes
- Cuisine of Seychelles
- Tiep
- Swallow
