= AfroFoodtv.com =

African food and lifestyle website

- Owner: Yetunde “Yeti” Ezeanii
- Website: www.afrofoodtv.com
- Commercial: Yes
- Launched: 1 September 2006; 20 years ago
- Current status: Offline

AfroFoodtv.com was a website that is dedicated to African food and lifestyle. The site was launched in September 2006 by Yetunde “Yeti” Ezeanii in Atlanta, Georgia. Ezeanii served as the chef and hostess of the website.

Afrofood was a network of African countries with their national organisations and experts for food composition data. The aim was to support and harmonise national collection and management of food composition data. Afrofood was established in September 1994 in Ghana and is part of the International Network of Food Data Systems (INFOODS). Afrofood consist of 46 African countries with 4 subregions.

== Content ==
=== Recipes ===
Africa is a continent of more than 50 countries, at different levels of development, using a wide variety of cooking styles and ingredients. The recipes offered on AfroFoodtv.com represented some of the well-known, classic dishes from the various regions of the continent. And as the website evolved, some of the recipes once incorporated African flavors into traditional Western dishes such as pizza and hamburgers.

The recipe section was broken down into the following areas: staples, soups, stews, chicken, fish, meat, snacks and sides.

=== Videos ===
AfroFoodtv.com has a video library with over 40 demonstrations of recipes. These videos are hosted by Ezeanii.

== Creator ==
Ezeanii has written and been featured in several articles on African cuisine in such publications as Nigeria World (online newspaper), Munaluchi (African bridal magazine), and The Sunday Paper Ezeanii is also the host of the "Taste of Africa" by Afrofoodtv show twice weekly on Afrotainment Television which is on the dish network channel 751. This makes "Taste of Africa" by Afrofoodtv the only currently running food television show dedicated exclusively to African cuisine.

== See also ==
- List of websites about food and drink
