= Gabonese cuisine =

Culinary tradition

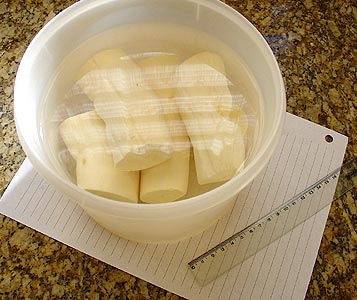
Cassava root, peeled.

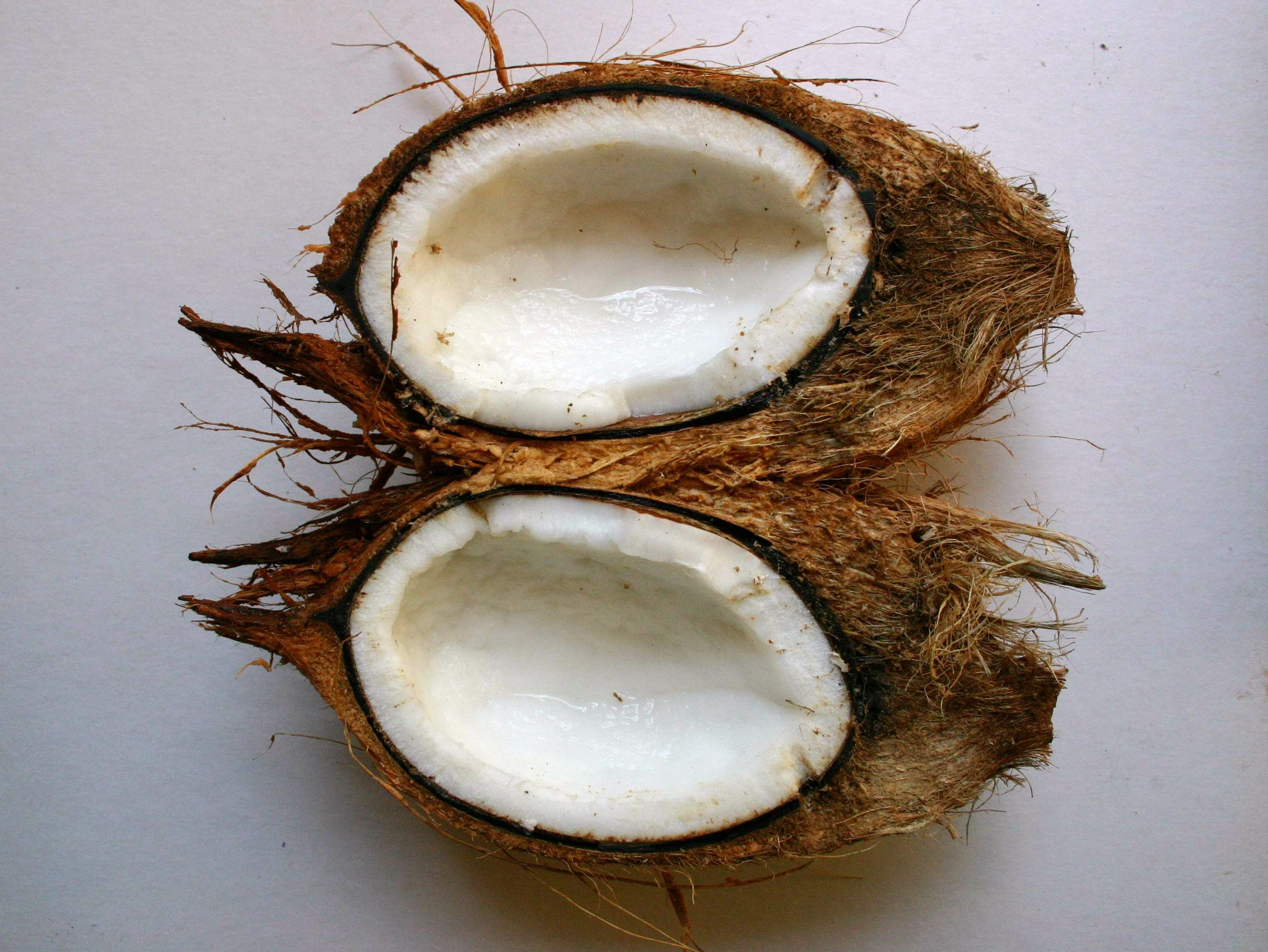
A split coconut

Gabonese cuisine comprises the cooking traditions, practices, foods and dishes associated with Gabon, a sovereign state on the west coast of Central Africa. French cuisine is prevalent as a notable influence, and in larger cities various French specialties are available. In rural areas, food staples, such as cassava, rice and yams, are commonly used.

Meats, when available, include chicken and fish, and bush meats such as antelope, wild boar and monkey. Sauces are often used, with hot red-pepper berbere paste being a common example.

Fruits include bananas, papayas, guavas, mangoes, pineapples, coconuts, avocado and peanuts. Plantains, tomatoes, corn, and eggplant are also used.

== History ==
The geographical location of Gabon on Atlantic coast has influenced its cuisine. The Mpongwe and Séké often caught and consumed sardines, while the Baka preferred fish from the deep ocean. Bantu-speaking groups later imported numerous New World foods, such as the cassava and papaya.

== Common foods and dishes ==
- Atanga (Dacryodes edulis), sometimes called "bush butter", is a firm fruit that is boiled and often used as a spread on bread
- Beignets, a deep-fried pastry, are very common
- Brochettes
- Dried meats, particularly in rural areas
- Fufu, a dish made from pounded cassava
- Nyembwe, chicken with palm nuts
- Mustard chicken with garlic, onions, and lemon juice
- Meat stews
- Mvout (Trichoscypha acuminata), a round and dark red fruit with a sour centre.
- Seafood
- Smoked fish
- Baked bananas, coated with bread crumbs and served with sour cream and brown sugar
- Gari, a cassava flour prepared as a porridge
- Plantains, whole, crushed and mashed

== See also ==
- African cuisine
- West African cuisine
