= Cuisine of Lesotho =

Culinary traditions of Lesotho

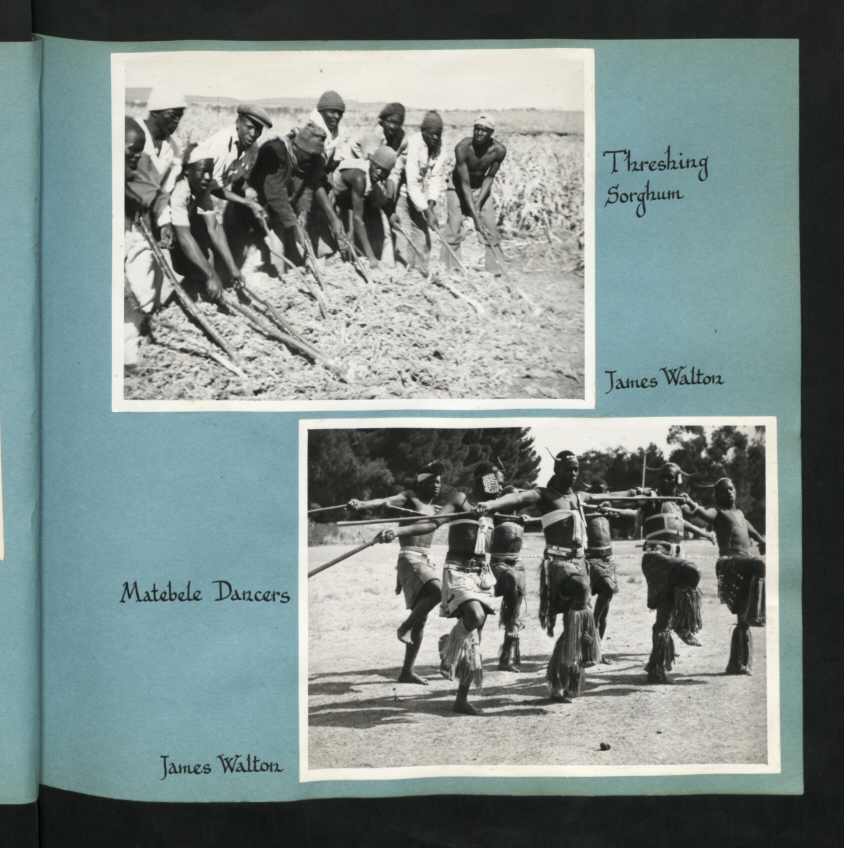
A photo of men threshing sorghum (top) and Matebele dancers (bottom) by James Walton

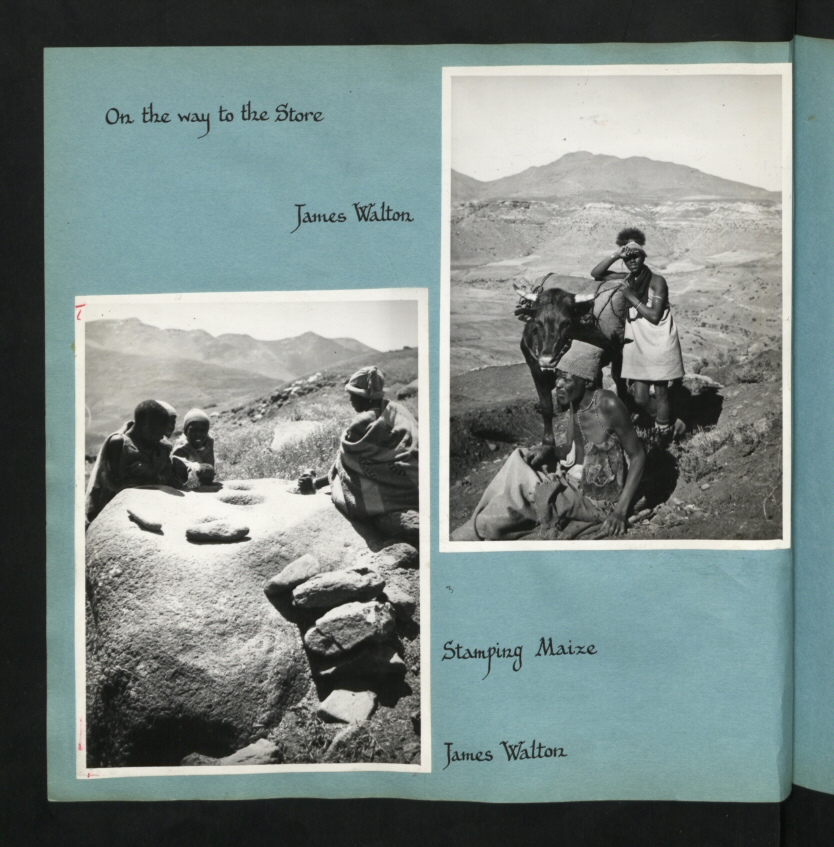
A photo captioned "on the way to the store" (top) and stamping maize (bottom)

Basotho (people of Lesotho) cuisine features African traditions and British influence. Lesotho is surrounded by South Africa and it shares culinary practices with its neighbor.

Lesotho's food culture features likhobe (a stew with beans, berries, and sorghum), meat, and vegetables. Corn-based dishes include papa and motoho (fermented sorghum porridge).

Basotho cuisine includes sauces, generally less spicy than other African countries. Beetroot and carrot salads are common side dishes.

British desserts can be found.

Other traditional foods include:

- Oxtail stew
- Curries
- Kebabs

== Beverages ==
- Ginger beer
- Local brews
- Motoho (fermented porridge)
