= Bissau-Guinean cuisine =

Culinary tradition

Location of Guinea-Bissau

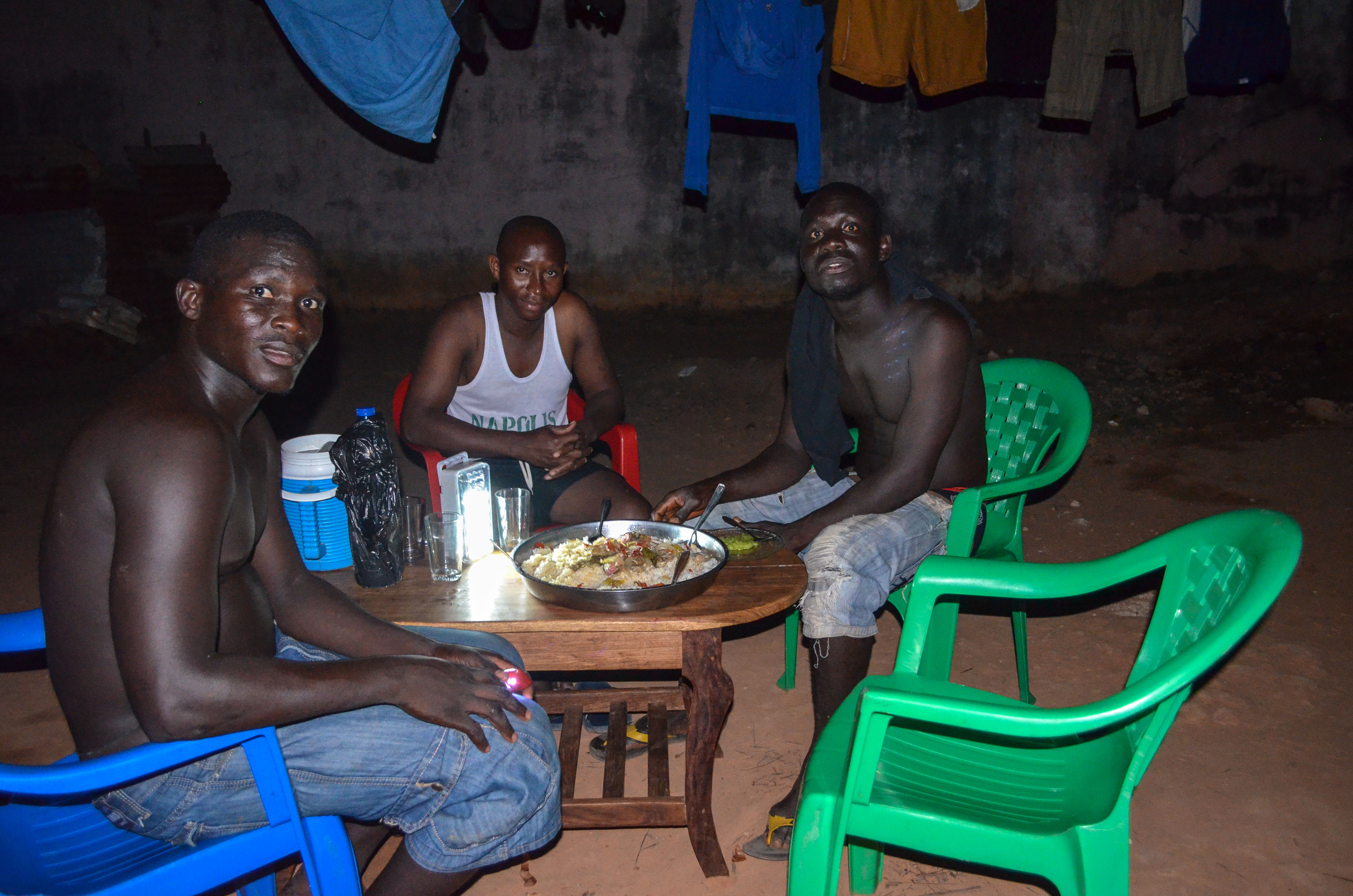
People sharing a meal in Bissau, the capital.

Bissau-Guinean cuisine is the traditional cuisine of Guinea-Bissau, a West African country located on the Atlantic Ocean. It reflects the country’s diverse ethnic groups, while millet and other grains are more common in inland areas. Seafood, including fish, shrimp, and shellfish, plays an important role in the diet, alongside locally grown crops such as cassava, sweet potatoes, yams, peanuts, beans, and tropical fruits.

Palm oil, peanuts, onions, tomatoes, peppers and spices are widely used in Bissau-Guinean cooking. Many traditional dishes consisted of rice served with flavored soups and stews, often prepared with fish, meat, vegetables, or peanut based sauces.

Portuguese influence can be seen in the use of certain ingredients and cooking techniques introduced during the colonial period, while many dishes remain rooted in indigenous West African culinary traditions.

Fish, shellfish, fruits and vegetables are commonly eaten along with cereal grains, milk, curd and whey. The Portuguese encouraged peanut production. Vigna subterranea (Bambara groundnut) and Macrotyloma geocarpum (Hausa groundnut) are also grown. Black-eyed peas are also part of the diet. Palm oil is harvested.

Common dishes include soups and stews. Common ingredients include yams, sweet potato, cassava, onion, tomato and plantain. Spices, peppers and chilis are used in cooking, including Aframomum melegueta seeds (Guinea pepper).

Three main meals per day is common, at standard

breakfast, lunch, and dinner times.

== Dishes ==
- Arroz de Cabra - a rice dish prepared with goat meat
- Arroz com iogurte (also known as badadji) - rice dish prepared with rice and plain yogurt often served with palm oil
- Cafriela de frango - a grilled or stew chicken dish marinated with lemon, garlic, and spices
- Caldo Branco - fish stew served with rice
- Caldo de mancarra (also spelled caldo di mancarra) - a traditional Bissau-Guinean peanut stew made with a peanut- based sauce, often prepared with chicken and served with rice
- Caldo de Tchebem (also known as Caldo de chebeu )- fish stew prepared with palm fruit extract, okra, and vegetables, typically served with rice.
- Canja - A soup prepared with chicken, rice, and aromatic seasonings
- Djambo - stew prepared with sweet potato leaves, peanuts, and beef or chicken
- Moni - a sweet corn flour porridge
- Sigá - stew or sauce prepared with palm oil, okra and meat or fish it is typically served with white rice.

== Beverages ==
• Canjira(also known as vinho de caju) - An alcoholic drink made from fermented cashew juice

• Sumo de caju- A non-alcoholic drink made from the juice of cashew fruits

• Palm wine - alcoholic beverage made from the fermented sap of palm trees

• Sumo di cabaceira - baobab fruit juice

• Sumo di foli - fruit-based juice

• Sumo di ondjo - a hibiscus juice made from the flowers of hibiscus

• Warga - a sweet green tea

== Desserts and sweets ==
• Bolo de bolocha - A Portuguese- influenced no-bake biscuit cake made with layers of biscuits soaked in coffee

• Canhã - peanut-based sweet made from ground peanuts

• Doce de amendoim - a peanut-based sweet

• Doce de papaya - A sweet made from papaya

• Sorvete di Cabaceira - a frozen dessert made with baobab

• Sorvete de ondjo - a frozen dessert made with ondjo(hibiscus)

• Thiakry - a dessert made with millet couscous and fermented milk or yogurt, often sweetened with sugar

== Pastries ==
• Donetes - small friend dough pastries similar to doughnuts

• Fidjós - a type of fried fritter made with banana

• Pastel - a savory fried pastry filled with tuna

• Rissois- small fried pastries filled with shrimp influenced by Portuguese cuisine

== Food culture and celebrations ==
Food plays an important role in social life in Guinea-Bissau. Meals are commonly shared with family, guests, and community, members, with hospitality being an important part of food traditions.

Traditional foods are prepared during weddings, births, circumcision ceremonies, funerals, and other gatherings. These events are often accompanied by communal meals and drinks such as palm wine and locally produced beverages.

National celebrations are also associated with traditional foods. On 12 September, the birthday of independence leader Amilcar Cabral celebrations mayincludes the eating of yassa, chicken prepared with mustard, citrus and onion.

Other celebrations include Carnival in February, Colonization Martyr's Day on August 3, Readjustment Movement Day in November, Independence Day on September 24, Mocidade Day on December 1 and New Year Day., where families and communities often gather around shared meals.

== History and influences ==
Guinea-Bissau’s cuisine had its roots in West African food traditions. Communities in the region relied on rice, millet, cassava, and palm oil as dietary staples, supplemented by fishing along the coast and river networks, and hunting further inland.

Portuguese colonization, beginning in the 15th century and lasting until independence 1974, introduced new crops and cooking influences that gradually became part of the local food culture.

Peanuts and cashews in particular were pushed as cash crops under colonial rule.

Portuguese cooking also left its mark through certain seasonings, stews with existing culinary practices rather than replacing them.

Bordering Senegal and Guinea, it shares West African staples like rice-based dishes, while its status as a former Portuguese colony connects it culinarily to other Lusophone African nations like Cape Verde.
