= Cuisine of Saint Helena =

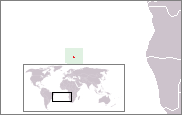
Location of Saint Helena in the South Atlantic Ocean

The island of Saint Helena has been influenced by several European powers, by the inhabitants, (especially enslaved people) and the ships passing through, during its history. This has affected the cuisine of Saint Helena, which now has a vibrant and international cuisine variety.

== Popular dishes ==
Popular dishes on the island include traditional British Sunday roast, curry and rice, black pudding, pumpkin stew, spicy fishcakes and Plo. Fish is a staple foods, along with rice, and spices are added to make a wide variety of dishes similar to those found in Caribbean cuisine.

Fishcakes are made from a mixture of spices, herbs, mashed potato and fresh fish like tuna and are shallow-fried until golden brown. Plo is a versatile one-pot dish made by combining a spiced curried rice with meat or fish; it can also be made without curry and just vegetables (known locally as "white Plo"). Coconut fingers are long, finger-shaped Madeira cakes dipped in pink icing and rolled in coconut. Pumpkin pudding is a dish of baked pumpkin, dried fruit, flour, eggs and nutmeg. Pumpkin pudding and coconut fingers are popular desserts.
