= Kuku paka =

African chicken dish

Kuku paka is a chicken dish with a coconut-based curry and is also called kuku na nazi. It has African, Indian and Arabic influences. Kuku in Swahili means chicken. The dish is particularly popular in the East African coast and among the Indian communities living in Kenya, Tanzania and Uganda. Paka in Swahili means to smear, to spread or to apply.

Coconut milk or coconut cream and curry spices are the main ingredients of the dish. What sets apart kuku paka from other coconut curries is the flavor from char-grilling the chicken before adding it to the coconut curry base. This gives it a smoky flavor. Shrimp or fish are often substituted for chicken in this popular East African dish.
