= Cuisine of Equatorial Guinea =

Culinary traditions of Equatorial Guinea

Location of Equatorial Guinea

The cuisine of Equatorial Guinea is a blend of the cuisines of the native peoples of this African country, including the Annobonese, the Bubi, the Fang, and the Kombe. It is also influenced by the cuisines of Spain (which colonized the country until 1968); other African nations such as Nigeria and Cameroon; Islamic states such as Morocco; and Creole cuisine overall. Its cuisine incorporates various meats, including game and bushmeat as well as imports, and is known for its strong flavors and high spice levels. Fish and chicken are common dishes.

While recipes vary from one community to another, the country's ethnic groups largely use the same ingredients. Soups and stews predominate. Tubers like yuca and yam, traditionally served boiled or fried, serve as the base of the Equatoguinean diet. The tropical climate favors the cultivation of a multitude of vegetables, like eggplant, and fruits, like atanga. The jungle is a source for aromatic herbs and wild game. Not unexpectedly, as fishing is a way of life for a large portion of Equatoguineans, the country's signature dish is pepesup (peppersoup), a spicy fish soup. Meals generally center around stewed sauces. Dishes cooked wrapped in banana leaves are also common. Main dishes are usually accompanied by rice or boiled or fried yuca, malanga, or plantain. Dishes adopted from other countries include the Spanish tortilla and the Cameroonian ndolé.

Chilies and other spices are popular. Key ingredients in Equatoguinean cuisine come from local plants and animals, including plantains, sweet potato, breadfruit, cassava, yam, cocoyam (known locally as malanga), groundnuts, and snails.

As for desserts, a highlight is the dish akwadu, which features baked bananas with coconut. For drinks, specialties include topé (palm wine) and malamba. Equatoguinean coffee and cocoa production peaked during the colonial period but has fallen significantly since, and what is referred to as "chocolate" in the country, also known as modica, is actually the seed of the African mango (also known as ogbono) that is sold powdered or in a block.

Agriculture in Equatorial Guinea is not significantly industrialized and more commonly done on small farms. A large portion of the population still only has access to one meal a day. However, special events such as weddings are celebrated with large banquets.

== Dishes ==
- Peppersoup, a West African soup that typically includes pepper, meats, and nutmeg;
- Sopa de pescado con cacahuete, a peanut (groundnut) soup with fish, onions and tomato;
- Bambucha, a stew or sauce of tender cassava leaves crushed and boiled with spices and juice of palm kernels (locally called dates). It is typically accompanied by boiled or fried plantain or yucca.
Equatoguinean dishes
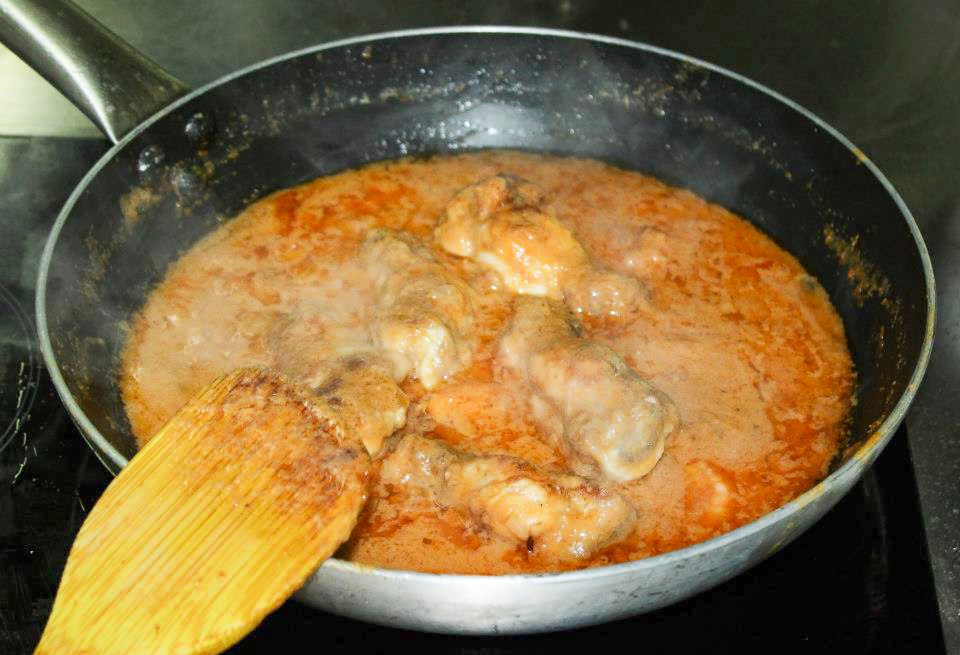
Chicken in peanut sauce

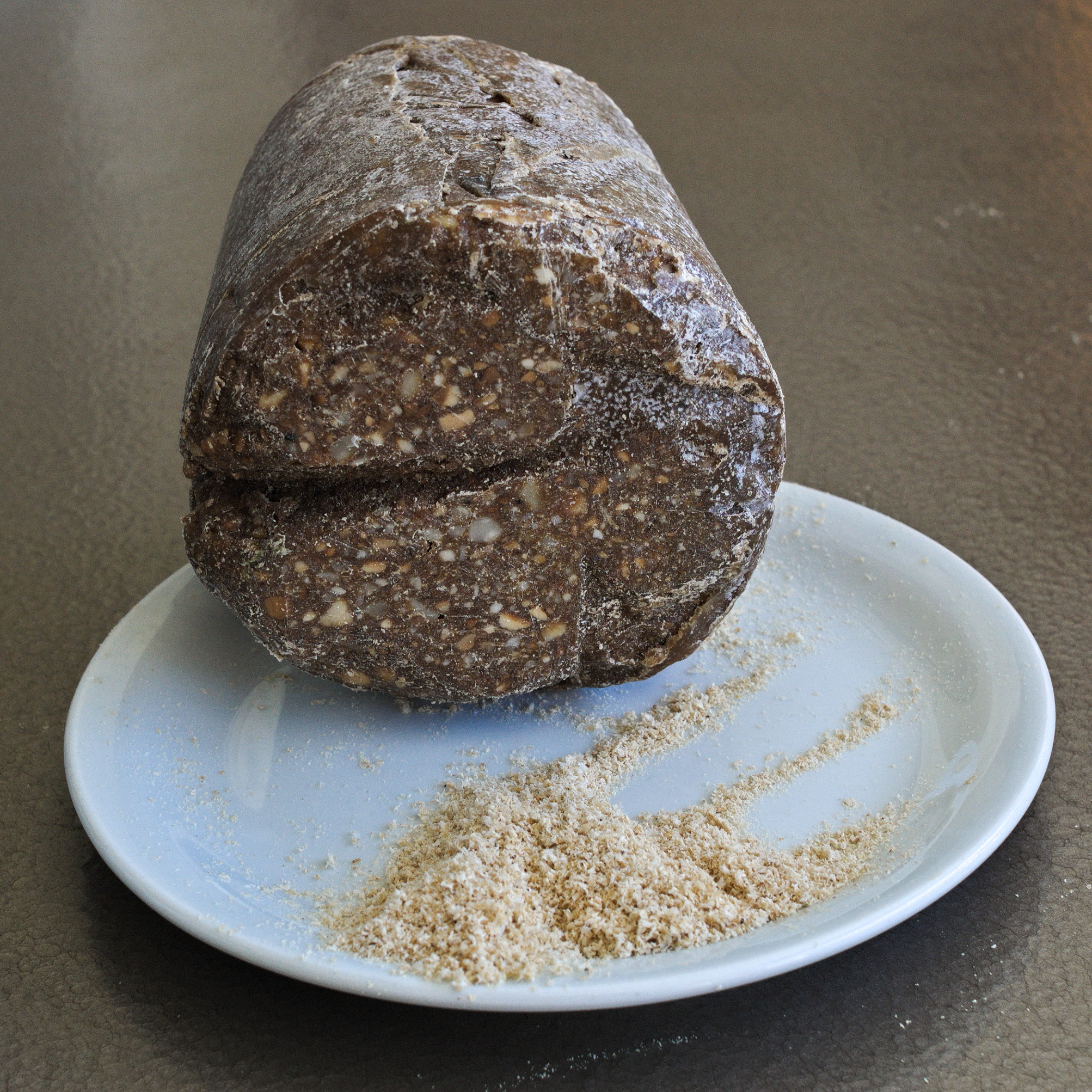
Modica in a block

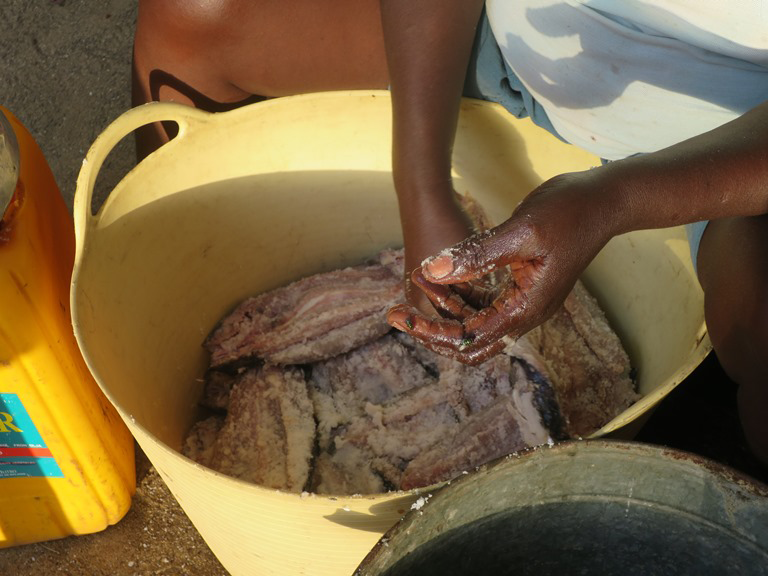
Salted fish

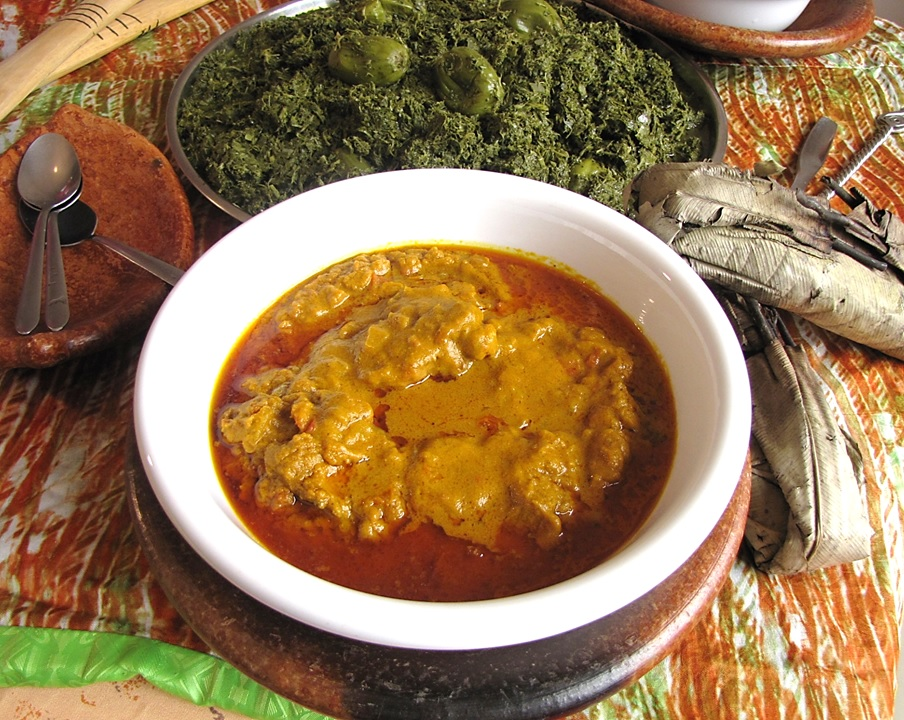
Chicken with moambe sauce

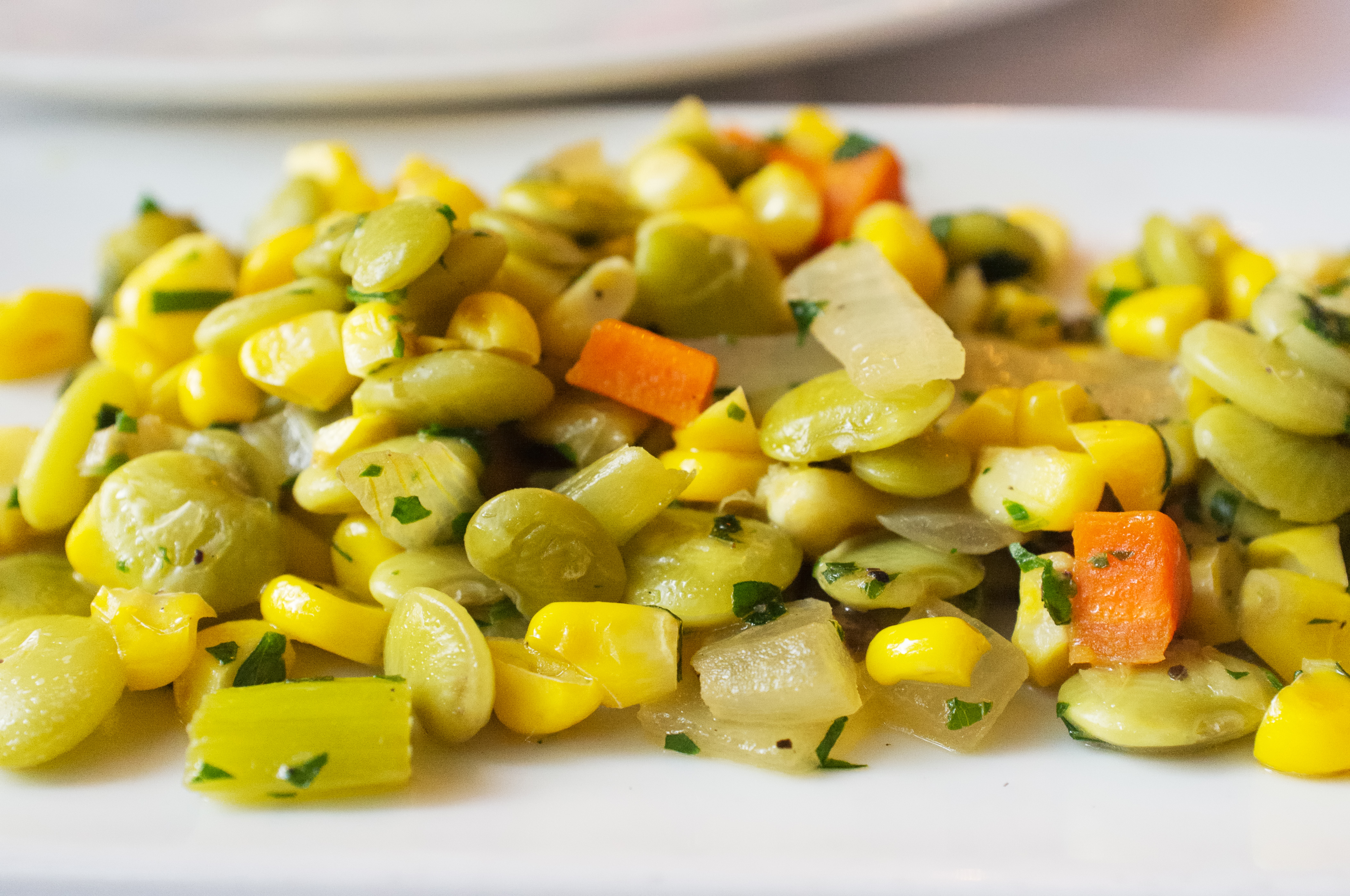
Succotash

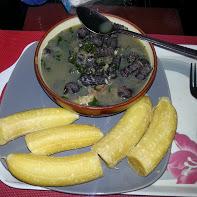
Plantain peppersoup

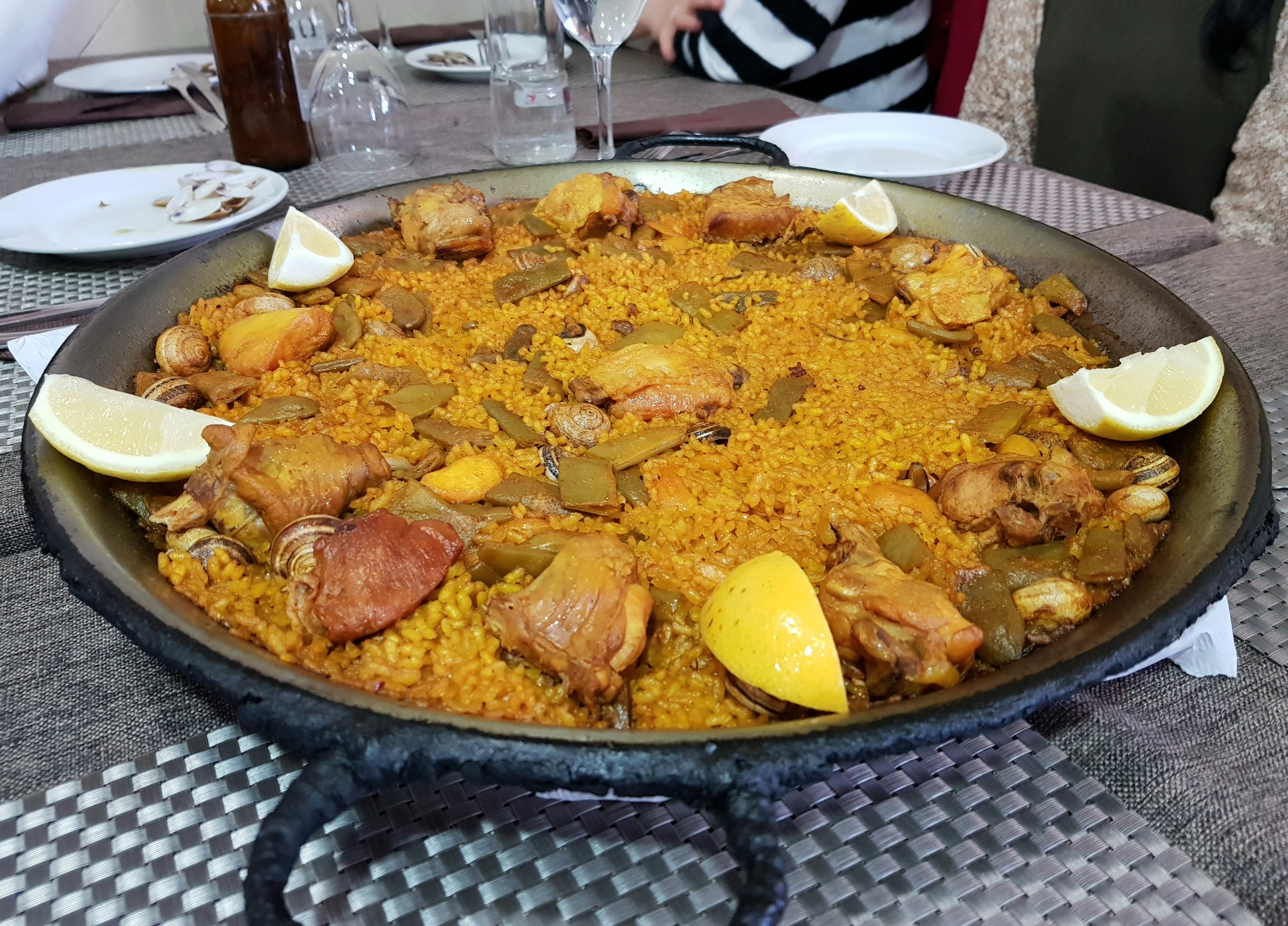
Paella

== See also ==
- Culture of Equatorial Guinea
