= Bomiwô =

Dish from Benin

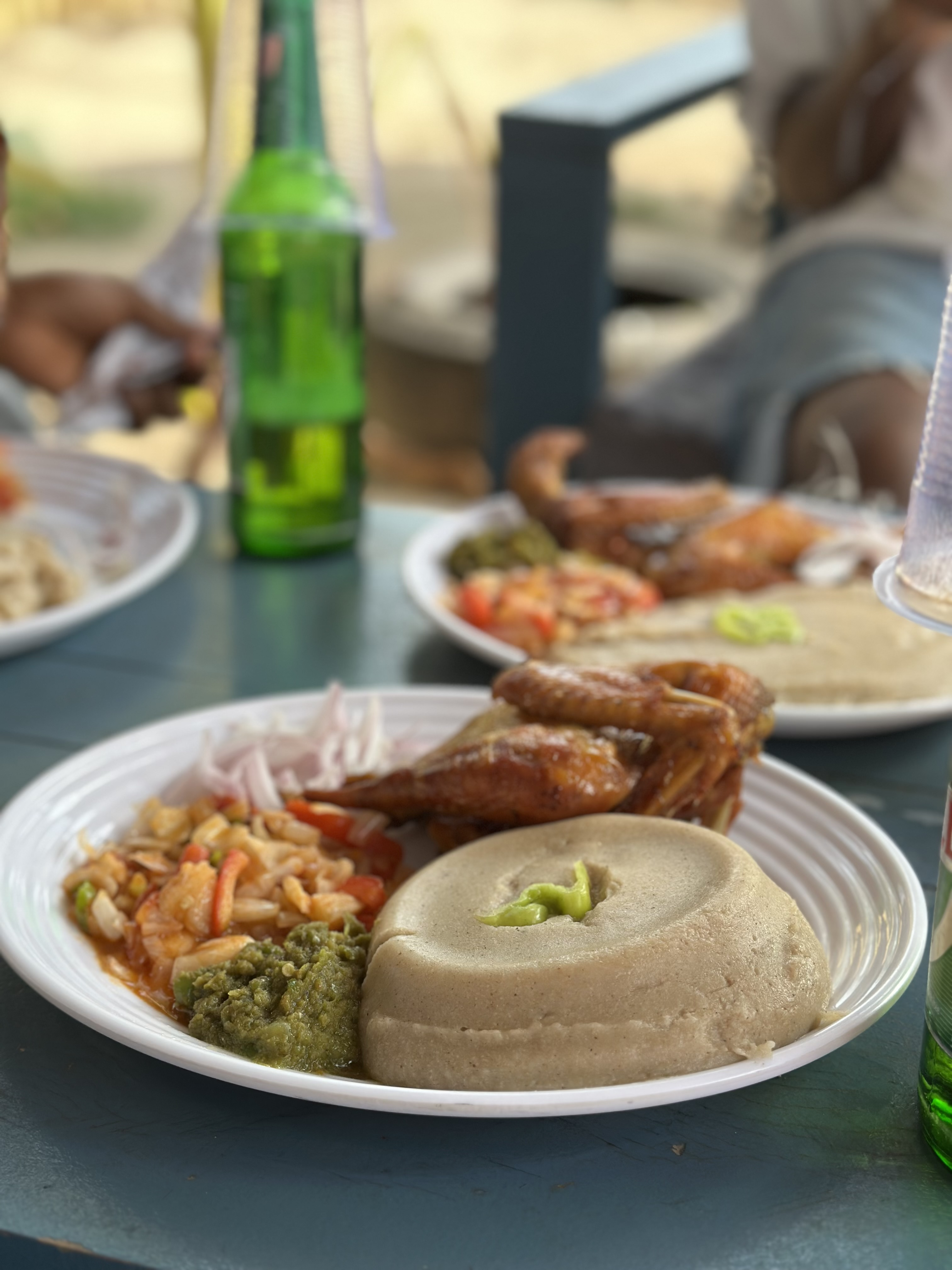
- Type: traditional dish
- Region or state: Benin

Bomiwô is a traditional dish from Benin, particularly associated with the Fon cultural areas in the southern part of the country. It is a maize-based paste prepared similarly to amiwô, another well-known Beninese dish, but differs in color, symbolism, and cultural significance.

== Etymology ==
The word Bomiwô comes from the Fon language (fongbe), where it is commonly interpreted as “pâte des gris-gris” or “fetish paste.” According to oral traditions, the dish was historically associated with Vodun religious practices and was once reserved for ancestors and sacred ceremonies in Vodun convents.

== Description ==
Bomiwô is mainly prepared from maize flour and is traditionally accompanied by chicken, especially local free-range chicken. Unlike amiwô, which is usually red because of tomato and palm oil, Bomiwô generally has a lighter appearance.

The dish is widely consumed in southern Benin during family gatherings, ceremonies, and festive events. Over time, it has evolved from a ritual food into a popular element of Beninese cuisine.

== Cultural significance ==
Bomiwô has strong cultural and spiritual importance within Fon society and Vodun traditions. Historical accounts describe it as a ceremonial food distributed during sacred rites. Contemporary chefs and cultural promoters have highlighted its symbolic value as part of Benin's culinary heritage.

In 2021, the commune of Bohicon presented Bomiwô as a representative culinary specialty during its participation in the UNESCO Creative Cities Network initiative focused on gastronomy.

== Preparation ==
Traditional preparation involves gradually mixing maize flour into boiling water while stirring continuously to obtain a smooth paste. Depending on regional practices, ingredients such as onions, spices, tomato, shrimp powder, or vegetable oil may also be added. It is commonly served with chicken and spicy sauces.

== See also ==
- Amiwô
- Fufu
- Yovo doko
