= Cuisine of Benin =

Culinary traditions of Benin

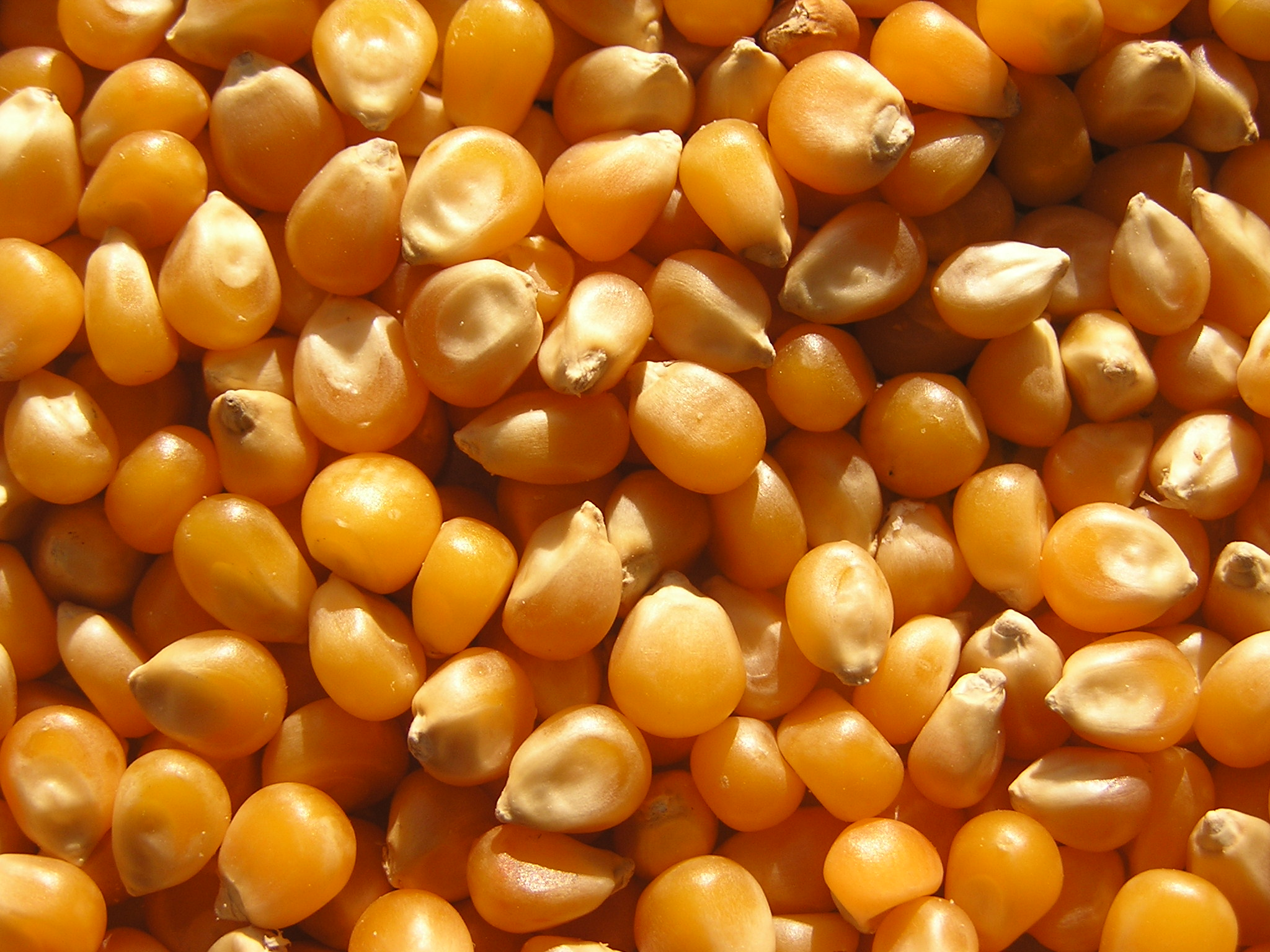
Maize is the most common staple food in southern Benin

Location of Benin

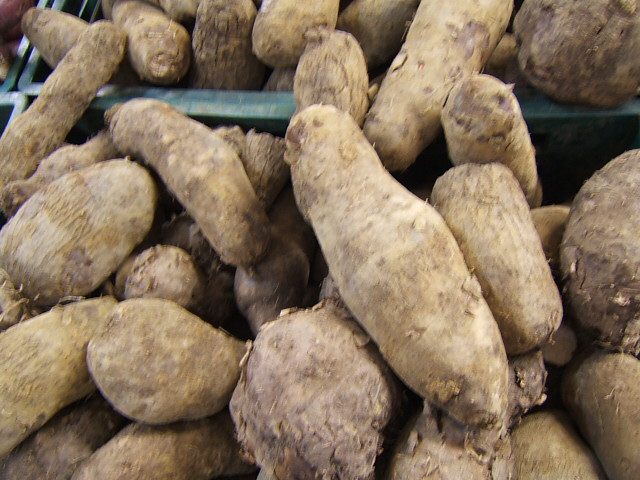
Yams are the most common staple food in northern Benin

Beninese cuisine involves many fresh meals served with a variety of sauces. Meat is usually quite expensive, and meals are generally light on meat and generous on vegetable fat.

In southern Benin cuisine, the most common ingredient is corn, often used to prepare dough which is mainly served with peanut- or tomato-based sauces. Fish and chicken are the most common meats used in southern Beninese cuisine, but beef, pork, goat and bush rat are also consumed. Meats are often fried in palm or peanut oil. Rice, beans, tomatoes and couscous are also significant staple foods. Fruits are common in this region, including mangoes, mandarin oranges, oranges, bananas, kiwifruit, avocados, pineapples and peanuts.

Yams are the main staple in northern Benin, and are also often served with peanut- or tomato-based sauces. The population in the northern provinces uses beef and pork meat which is also fried in palm or peanut oil or cooked in sauces. Cheese is also frequently used in some dishes.

== Food preparation ==
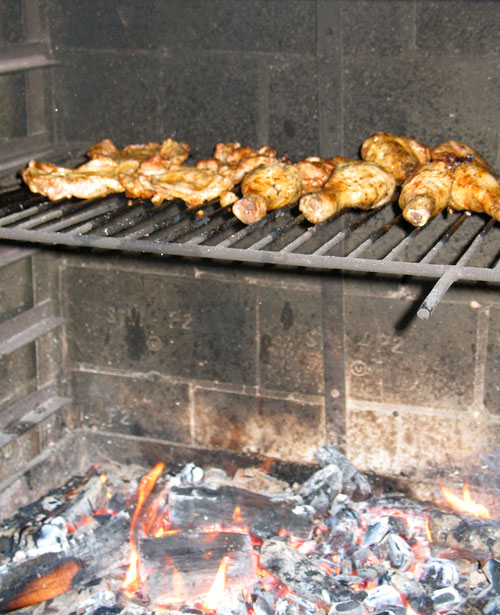
Chicken

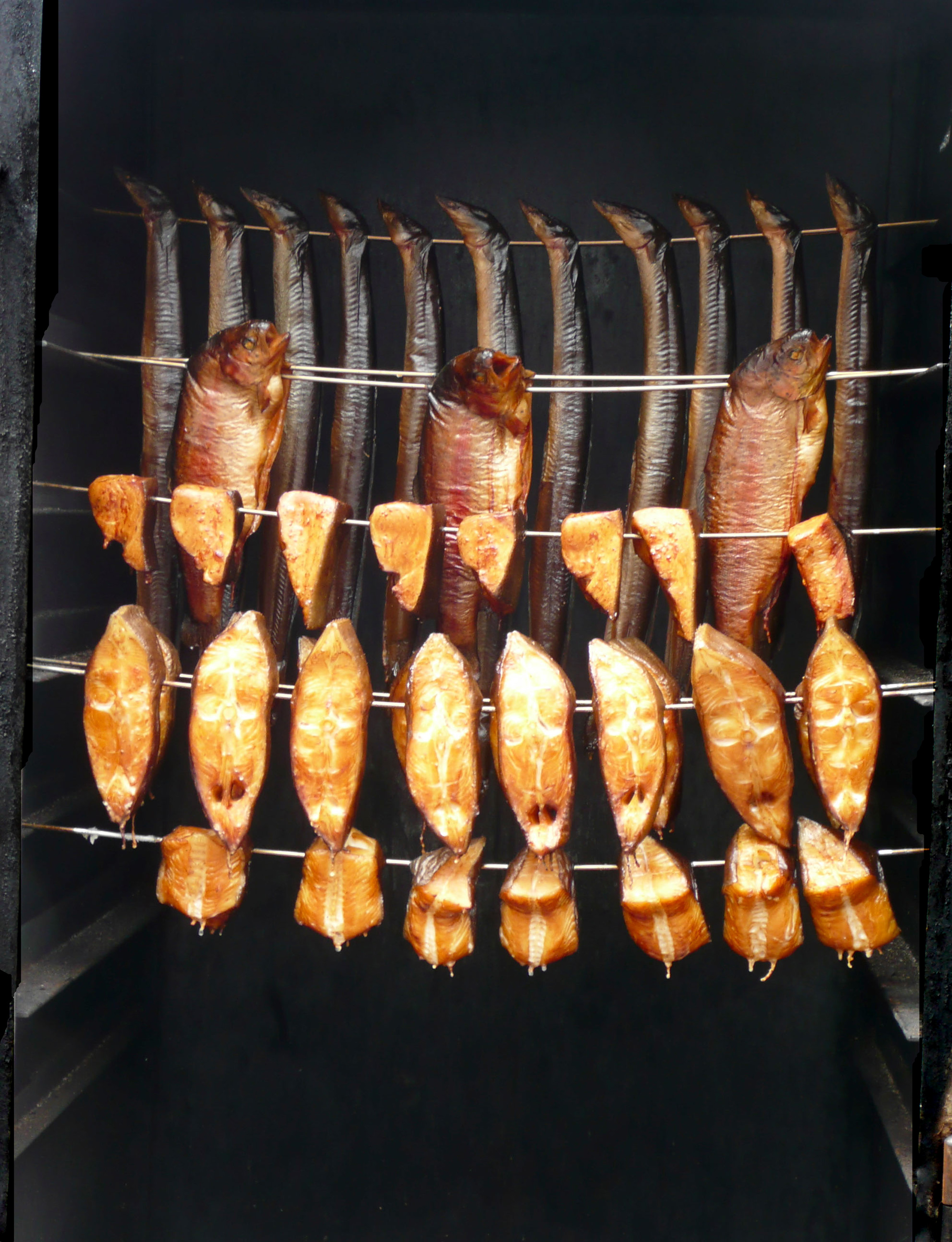
Smoked fish in smoker

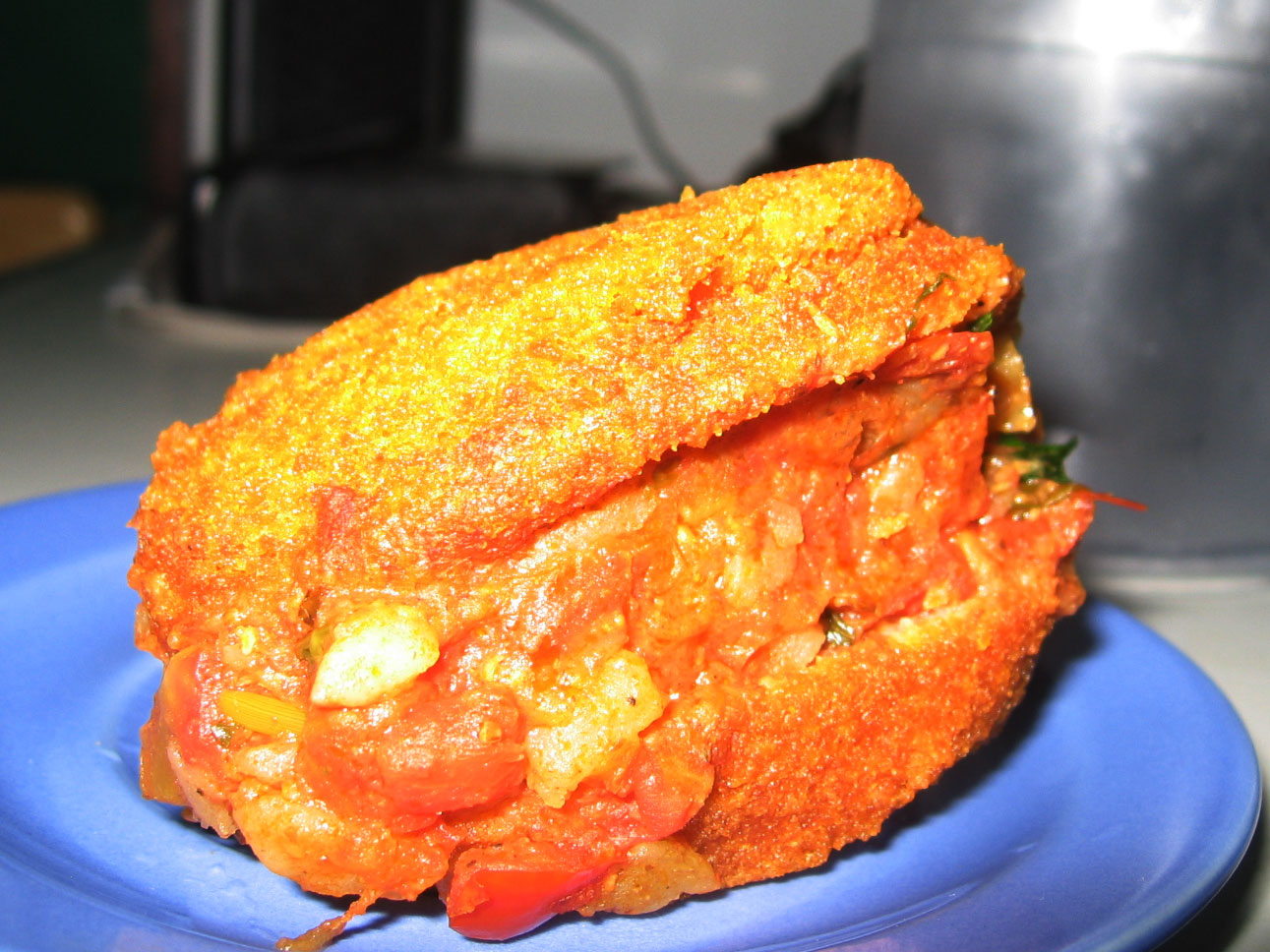
Acarajé is peeled black-eyed peas formed into a ball and then deep-fried

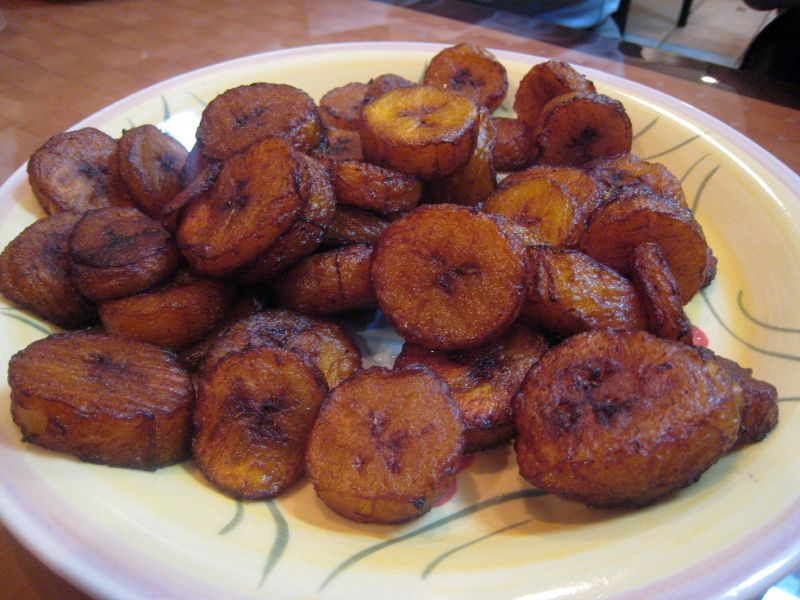
Aloko (fried plantain)

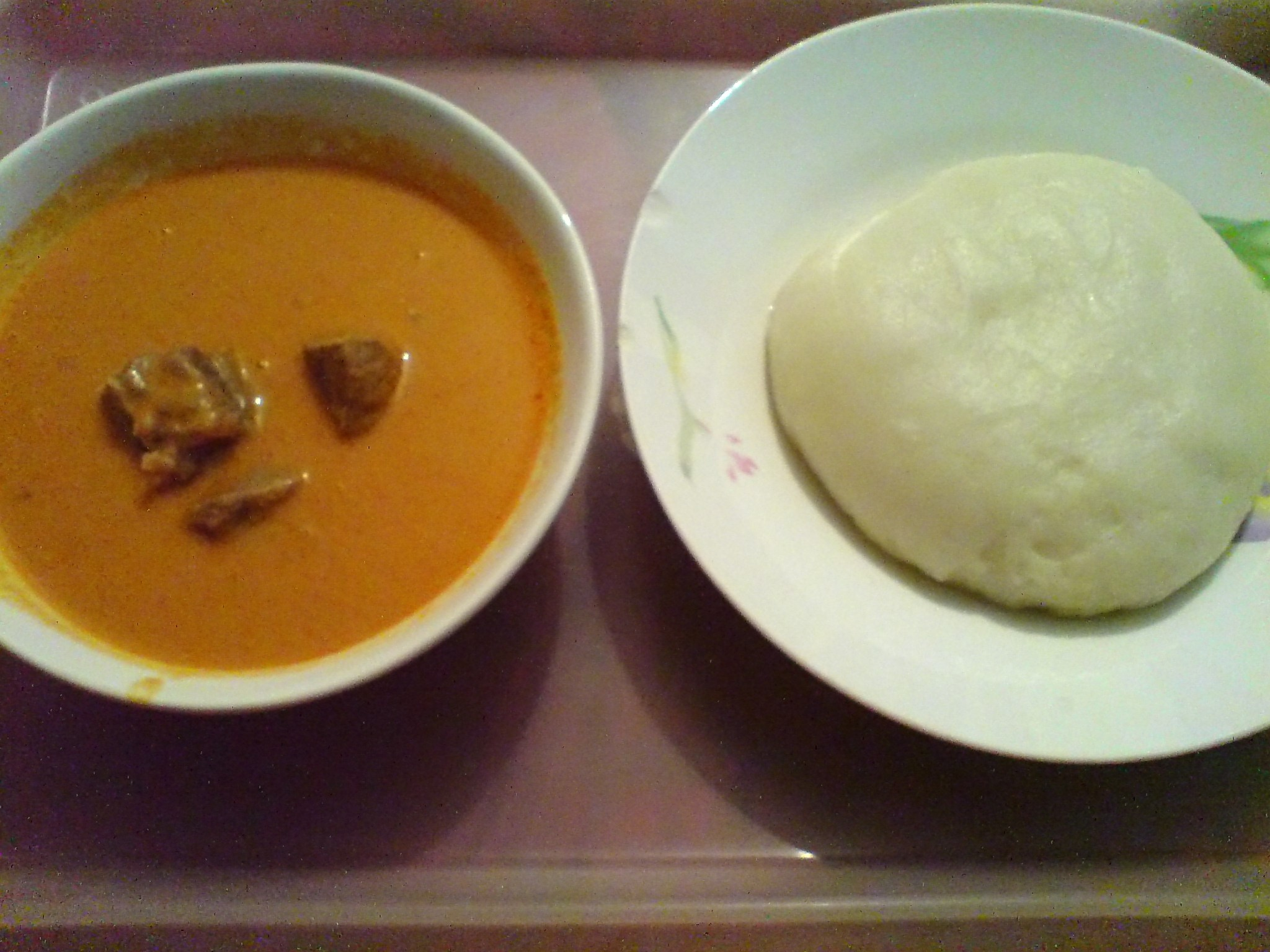
A plate of fufu (right) accompanied with peanut soup

Frying in palm or peanut oil is the most common meat preparation, and smoked fish is also commonly prepared in Benin. Grinders are used to prepare corn flour, which is made into a dough and served with sauces. "Chicken on the spit" is a traditional recipe in which chicken is roasted over fire on wooden sticks. Palm roots are sometimes tenderized by soaking in a jar with saltwater and sliced garlic, then used in various dishes.

Many people have mud stoves for cooking and also mud pots which are used to preserve the meal, and mud pots are used to store water; these pots are usually kept outside the home.

== Specialty foods ==
=== Wagasi cheese ===
Wagasi is a specialty cows'-milk cheese of northern Benin made by the Fulani people, and is abundantly available in cities such as Parakou. It is a soft cheese with a mild flavor and a red rind, and used often in Beninese cooking.

=== Àkàrà ===
Àkàrà is a dish made from peeled black-eyed peas formed into a ball and then deep-fried in red palm oil. It is found in most parts of Benin, Nigeria and Ghana.

=== Other specialty foods ===
Other Beninese dishes include:

- Akassa—fermented corn dough served with a sauce
- Akpan—corn dumplings, dipped in a sauce
- Aloko—fried plantain
- Amiwo—red corn dough, often made with tomato puree, onion and peppers and served with a sauce
- Beignets—cake made of roasted peanuts, cooked in oil
- Dough—corn dough, usually soaked in sauces
- Fufu—mashed yams formed into a paste
- Garri—a common West African food made from cassava tubers
- Igname pilée—pounded yams with tambo chili, tomatoes, onion, chicken consommé and peanuts with beef
- Moyo—a sauce usually served with fried fish, consisting of tomato sauce, onion and peppers

== Beverages ==
Choukoutou or "chouk" is a Beninese millet beer commonly consumed in northern Benin, and shipped to southern Benin by railway and roadways. Sodabi is a liquor made from wine palm, and often consumed at events and ceremonies.

== See also ==
- African cuisine
