= Ọya =

Orisha in the Yorùbá religion

- Storms; Cemeteries; Wind; Thunder; Lightning; The dead
- Member of Orisha
- Oya depicted with 9 children in Oya Grove, Ira, Kwara State, Nigeria
- Other names: Oyá; Oiá; Iyansan; Yànsàn-án; Yansã; Iansã; Iansan; Iyámsá
- Venerated in: Yorùbá religion, Umbanda, Candomblé, Santería, Batuque, Quimbanda, Haitian Vodou, Folk Catholicism
- Major cult center: Osun-Osogbo
- Symbol: Lightning, sword/machete, flywhisk (iruké), water buffalo
- Day: The fourth day of the Kọjọda week
- Color: Brown, burgundy, rainbow
- Region: Yorubaland, Latin America
- Ethnic group: Yorùbá
- Festivals: Ọya Festival

Genealogy
- Spouse: Ogun, Shango, Oko

Ọya (Yorùbá: Ọya, also known as Oyá, Oiá, Yànsàn-án, Yansã, Iyámsá, or Iansã) is one of the principal female deities of the Yoruba pantheon. She is the oriṣa of winds, lightning, and storms and is the only oriṣa capable of controlling the Eégún (spirits of the dead), a power given to her by Babalú Ayé.

== Beliefs and Attributes ==
Ọya lived on Earth as a human from the town of Ira, in present day Kwara state, Nigeria, where she was a wife of the Alaafin of Oyo, Shango. In Yorùbá, the name Ọya is believed to derive from the phrase coined from "ọ ya" which means "she tore," referring to her association with powerful winds. She was believed to have the power to shape-shift into a buffalo, and is often depicted as one in traditional Yorùbá poetry. As such, the buffalo serves as a major symbol of Ọya, and it is forbidden for her priests to kill one. She is known as Ọya Ìyáńsàn-án, the "mother of nine", because of the nine children she gave birth to with her third husband Oko, after suffering from a lifetime of barrenness. She is the patroness of the Niger River (known to the Yorùbá as the Odò-Ọya).

In the Yoruba religion, Ọya was married three times, first to the warrior orisha Ogun, then Shango, and finally, another hunting and farming deity, Oko.

Oya was traditionally worshipped only in the areas of Yorubaland once under the control and influence of the Oyo Empire. Because of the Atlantic slave trade, many of her followers of Oyo origin were kidnapped and sold to the New World, where her worship became widespread. Oya worship has also spread to other parts of Yorubaland.

=== Characteristics ===
- Salutation: "Eeparrei!", or "Epahhey, Oia!"
- Consecrated day: Wednesday
- Colors: red, purple and rainbow, burgundy
- Symbols: "Buffalo tail" eruquerê, a ritual object; or a copper sword
- Prohibitions: pumpkin, stingray, and mutton
- Food: acarajé/àkàrà

== Syncretism ==
Oya is part of religious Syncretism across the Americas. In the Caribbean, she's associated with the Catholic Virgin of Candelaria as well as the Taíno deity Atabey; In Brazilian Candomblé, she is associated with Saint Barbara; and in Cuban Santería, she's associated with Teresa of Ávila.

== Myths and legends ==
=== Dominion over the dead ===
Oyá gained control over the dead after dancing for Babalú Ayé, who, moved by her compassion and bravery, granted her dominion over the Eégún. This myth highlights her deep connection with death and spiritual transition.

=== The nine children ===
After struggling with infertility, Oyá was advised by a Babalawo to perform a sacrifice involving 18,000 sea snails, colored fabrics, and ram meat. She followed the instructions and gave birth to nine children, earning the name Iyansan.

== Paths of Ọya ==
In some traditions, Ọya is believed to manifest in 23 avatars or paths:

1. Oya Yansa Bí Funkó
2. Oya Dumí
3. Oya De
4. Oya Bumí
5. Oya Bomi
6. Oya Nira
7. Oya Igbalé
8. Oya Niké
9. Oya Tolá
10. Oya Dira
11. Oya Funké
12. Oya Iya Efon
13. Oya Afefere
14. Oya Yansá Mimú
15. Oya Obinídodo
16. Oya Yansa Duma
17. Oya Yansa Doco
18. Oya Tombowa
19. Oya Ayawá
20. Oya Tapa
21. Oya Tomboro
22. Oya Yansa Odó
23. Oya Yansá Orirí

== Candomblé ==
In Candomblé, Oyá is known as Iansã or lyá Mésàn, or most commonly, Iansã, from the Yoruba Yánsán. She is revered as a fierce warrior, the queen of the Niger River, and the mother of nine. Iansã controls mysteries surrounding the dead and is commonly associated with the color red in the Angola-Congo nation. Her salutation is "Eeparrei!" or "Epahhey, Oia!"

Iansã, as in Yoruba religion, commands winds, storms, and lightning. She is the queen of the river Niger and the mother of nine. She is a warrior and is unbeatable. Attributes of Iansã include great intensity of feelings, sensations, and charm. Another ability attributed to Iansã is control over the mysteries that surround the dead. Iansã is syncretized with Saint Barbara. In the Candomblé nação (association) of Angola Congo, Iansã is associated with the color red.

== Ritual foods ==
Offerings include Àkàrà (acarajé), eggplant, mulberries, dark chocolate, and specific puddings. Acarajé, a fried patty made from crushed black-eyed peas and spices, is both a ritual food and a street delicacy in Bahia, Brazil.

Acarajé is a spherical patty made with peeled, crushed black-eyed peas, stuffed with small shrimp, okra, crushed peanuts, and other savory, piquant spices. The ball-like patty is fried in dendê oil (red palm oil). It's a traditional Afro-Brazilian dish that is also a traditional offering to Iansã in the Candomblé tradition. A simple, unseasoned form of acarajé is used in rituals and a version served with various condiments is sold as a common street food in Bahia in the northeast of Brazil. Ipeté and bobo de inhame are also associated with Iansã.

In Yorùbá, her food is Àkàrà. Eggplant, mulberries, pudding, and dark chocolate are also foods for Oya. In Brazil, Rosé wine and yellow flowers are also considered possible offerings.

== Symbols and tools ==
Oyá is symbolized by lightning, swords, flywhisks (iruké), and tornados. She wears multicolored garments and carries ritual items forged from metal.

== See also ==
- Egungun-oya
- Yoruba religion
- Orisha
- Shango
- List of wind deities
- List of thunder deities

== Bibliography ==
- Judith Gleason. Oya: In Praise of an African Goddess. Harper, 1992.
- Charles Spencer King. Nature's Ancient Religion.
- Douglas Pulleyblank. "Yoruba". In B. Comrie (ed.), The Major Languages of South Asia, the Middle East and Africa, Routledge, 1990.
- Natalia Bolívar Aróstegui. Orishas del Panteón Afrocubano. Quorum Editores, 2008.
- Vagner Gonçalves Silva. Orixás da metrópole. Editora Vozes, 1995.
- Muniz Sodré. O terreiro e a cidade. Vozes, 1988.
- Muniz Sodré and Luís Filipe Lima. Um vento sagrado.
- Jean Ziegler. Os vivos e a morte. Zahar, 1977.
