= Togolese cuisine =

Culinary traditions of Togo

External videos
- Ablotò: Preparing Ablo in Assahoun, Togo. (Cuisine togolaise)

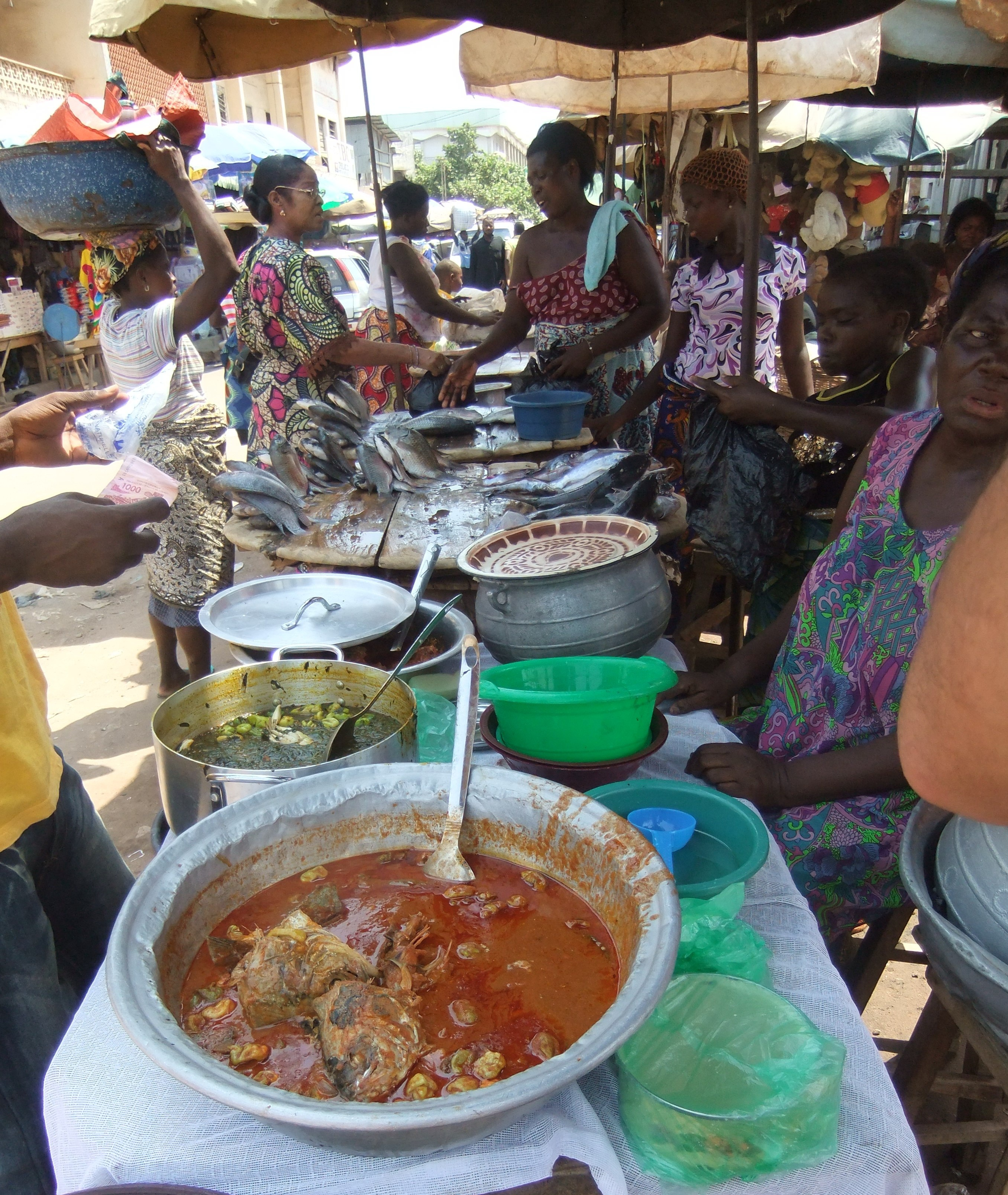
Street food in Lomé

Togolese cuisine is the cuisine of the Togolese Republic, a country in West Africa. Staple foods in Togolese cuisine include maize, rice, millet, cassava, yam, plantain and beans. Maize is the most commonly consumed food in the Togolese Republic. Fish is a significant source of protein. People in Togo tend to eat at home, but there are also restaurants and food stalls.

== Foods and dishes ==
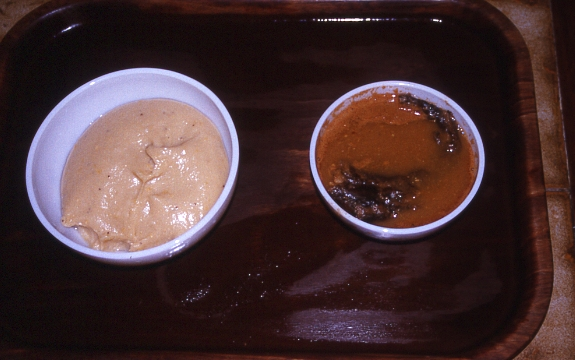
Fufu (left) and palm nut soup (right).

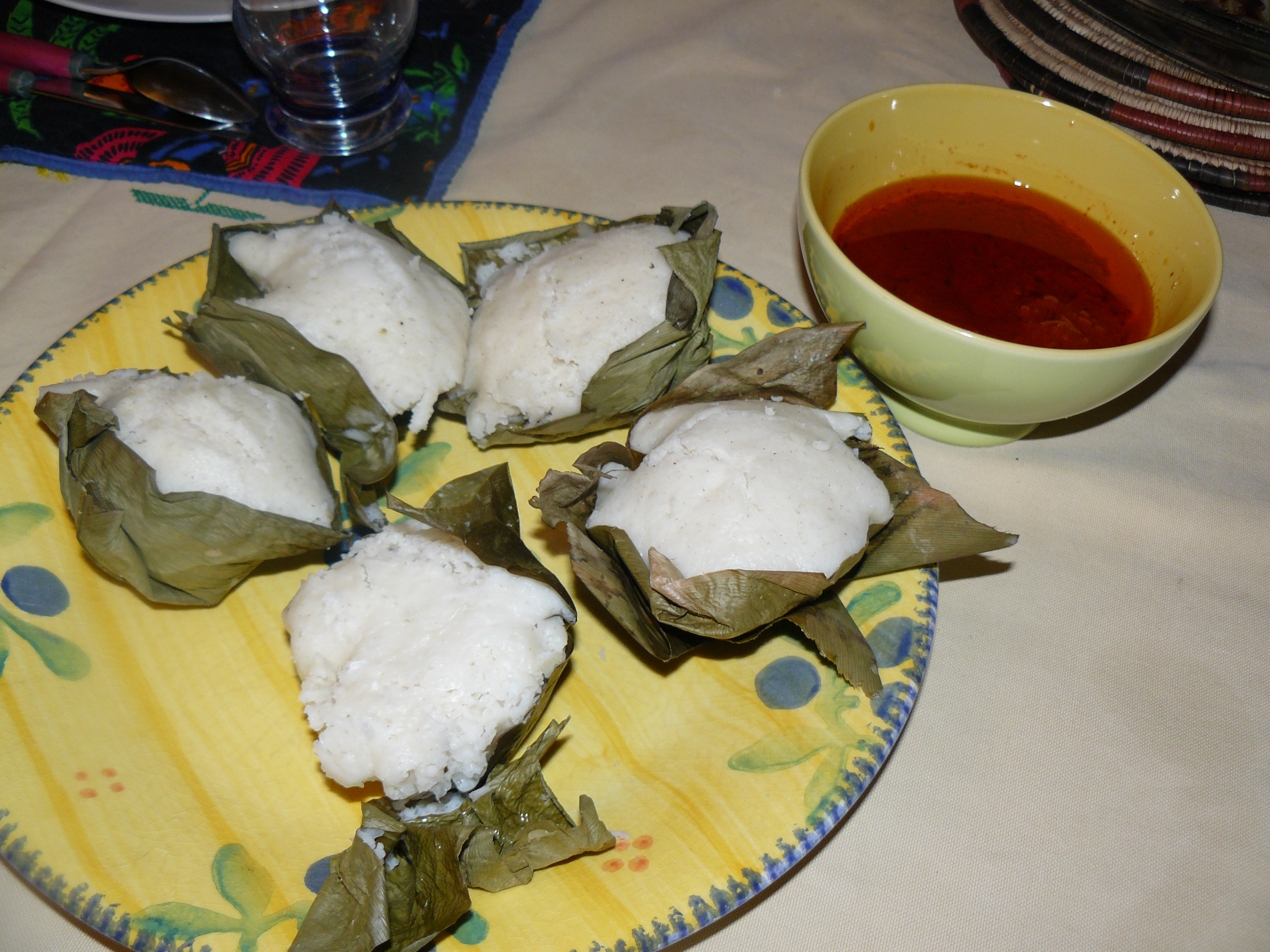
Ablo, a maize-based food

Togolese style is often a combination of African, French, and German influences. The cuisine has many sauces and different types of pâté, many of which are made from eggplant, tomato, spinach, and fish. The cuisine combines these foods with various types of meat and vegetables to create flavorful dishes. Roadside food stands sell foods such as groundnuts, omelettes, brochettes, corn-on-the-cob, and cooked prawns.

Additional foods and dishes include:

- Agouti, known as "grasscutters"
- Akpan, fermented maize dessert
- Akume, prepared from ground maize served with a side, usually okra soup
- Baguette bread
- Chili peppers are often used as a spice
- Fufu is very common, made from peeled and boiled yams which are then pounded with a pestle until reaching a dough consistency Fufu is typically accompanied with sauces.
- Goat meat
- Koklo meme, grilled chicken with a chili sauce
- Kokonte, a pâté made from cassava
- Pâté, a commonly consumed cornmeal cake
- Peanuts

== Southern Togolese cuisine ==
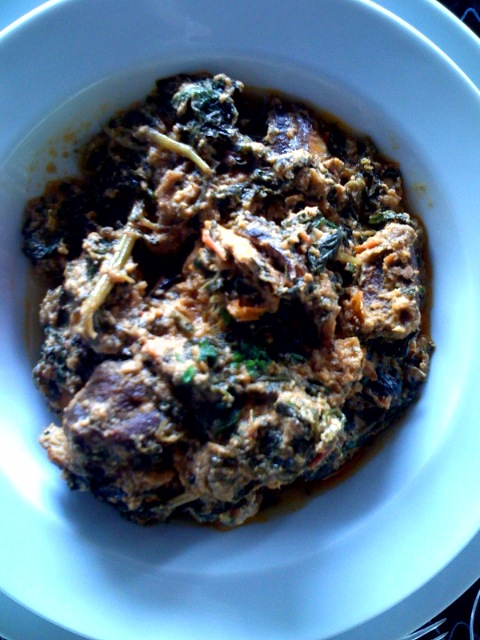
Gboma déssi

- Riz sauce d’arachide, a rice dish made with groundnut sauce.
- Sakomi or sakome, a sandwich that consists of a baguette stuffed with shredded cabbage, carrots, beets, fresh herbs, cooked spaghetti or noodles, sliced boiled eggs, sausages, soft beans, mayonnaise, onion stew base, and spicy red pepper sauce.

=== Starters ===
- Salad with papaya
- Tomato and onion salad
- Avocado salad with sole
- Avocado salad in cubes, usually served with tomato, hard-boiled egg and onions

=== Sauces ===
- Fétri déssi: okra sauce (fétri = okra; dessi = sauce) cooked with palm oil or other oils, beef, shrimp, crab, smoked fish

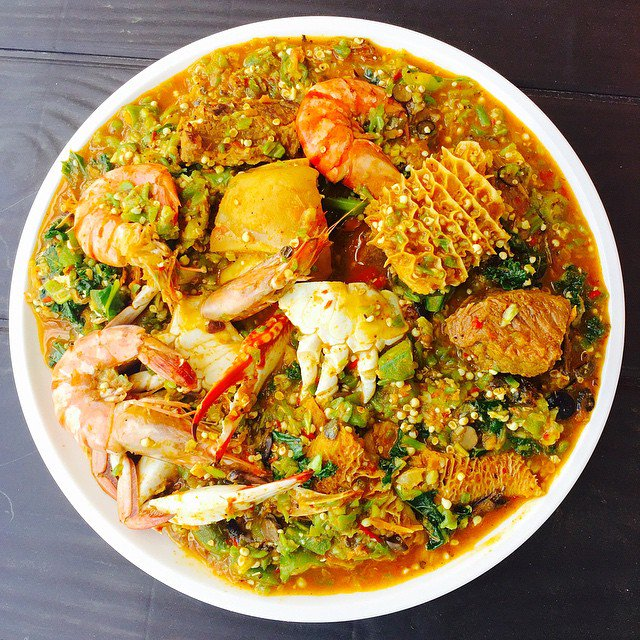
Fétri déssi

- Gboma déssi: spinach-based sauce with meat, smoked fish, or seafood
- Adémè déssi: sauce of leafy greens (adémè)
- Egoussi déssi: thick sauce of ground egusi seeds, gboma leaves, tomato, onion, spices, beef, akpanman (softened cow skin), seafood

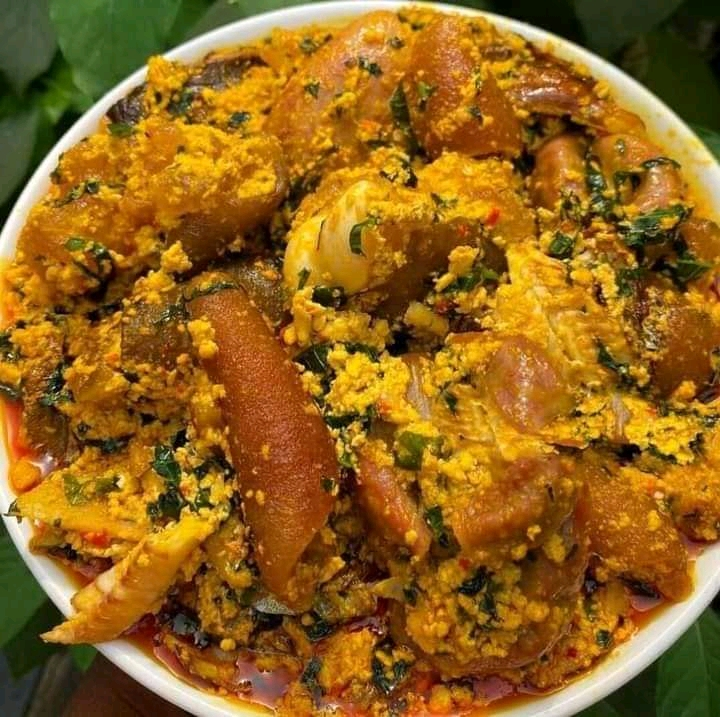
Egoussi déssi

- Gbôh-lan déssi: goat meat sauce
- Alin déssi: mutton sauce
- Gni-lan déssi: beef tomato sauce
- Gni-fôti déssi: cow feet tomato sauce
- Agbanmé déssi: light tomato sauce with beef strips or fish
- Dékou déssi: palm nut sauce with offal, beef, fish
- Yébéssé-si: raw spicy tomato and chili paste
- Han-lan déssi: pork tomato sauce
- Hô-lan déssi: smoked agouti tomato sauce (Dasyprocta)
- Azin'g déssi: peanut paste sauce
- Lan-moumou déssi: fish sauce with tomato

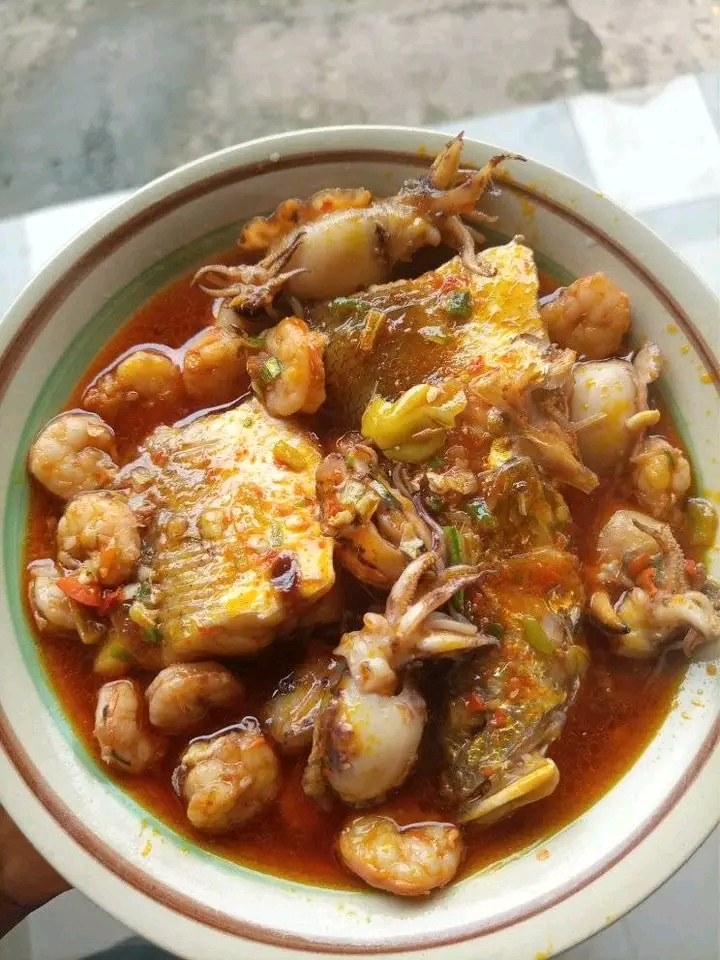
Lan-moumou déssi

- Kanlanmi déssi: fried fish tomato sauce
- Dowèwi déssi: sauce with fresh or smoked anchovies

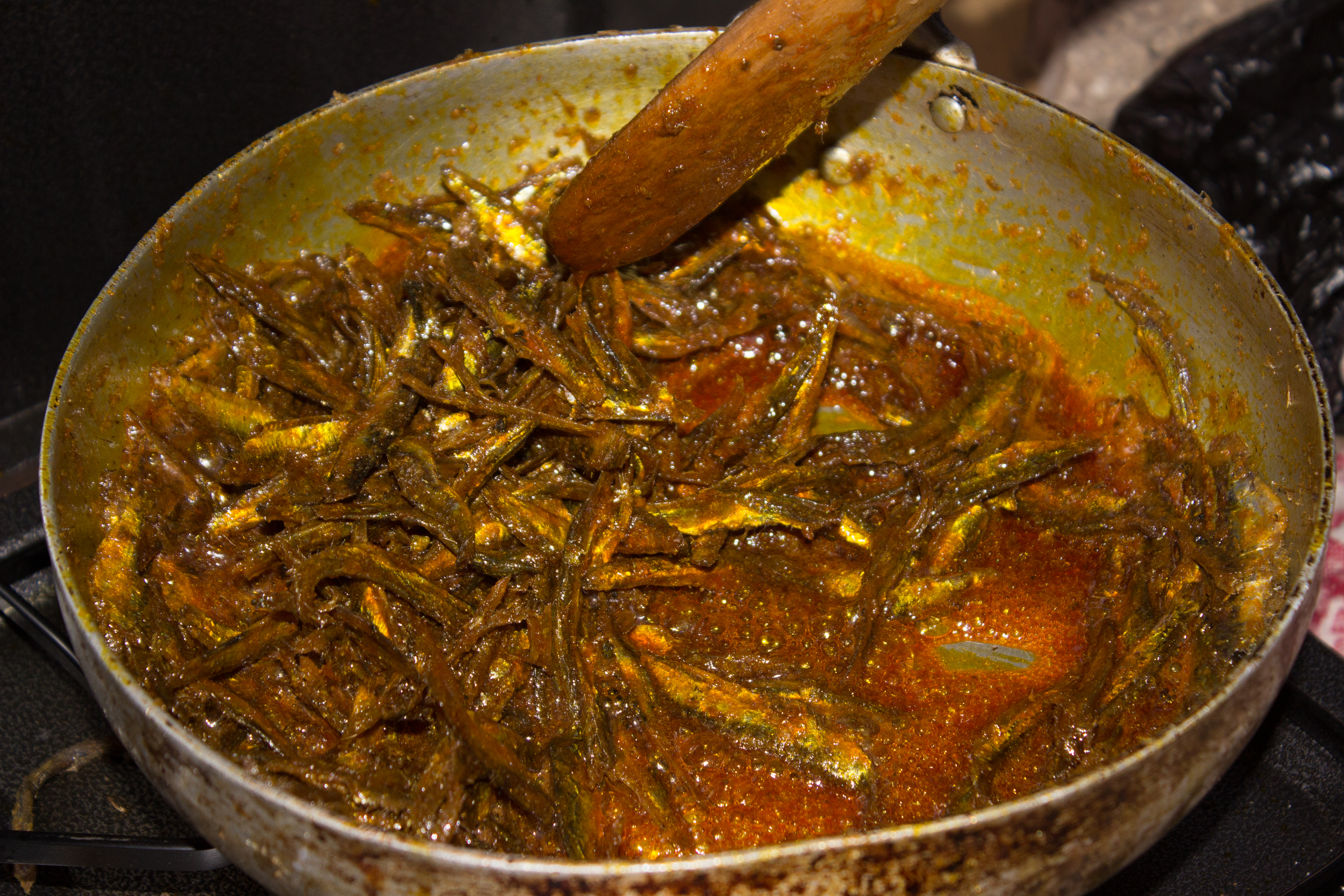
Dowèwi déssi

- Gbékui déssi: thick leafy greens sauce (gboma, amaranth, Cleome gynandra) with meat or fish
- Déssi hé: white sauce with vegetables and fish

=== Starches and doughs ===
- Akoumé: staple maize porridge (dough), cooked in boiling water and served as main accompaniment to various sauces. Two main methods:

éwɔ-koumé: dry maize flour stirred directly into boiling water until firm. If prepared with dried cassava flour instead, it is called konkonte (also popular in Ghana), similar to amala of the Yoruba people.
éma-koumé: fermented wet maize dough, sieved and settled, then cooked into a smooth, lighter, whiter paste. When made with fermented cassava dough, it is agbélimá-koumé, similar to Placali from Ivory Coast.

- Akoumé (in Gen language) is the same as akplè (Ewe language), or banku (Ga language), close to tô (Burkina Faso).

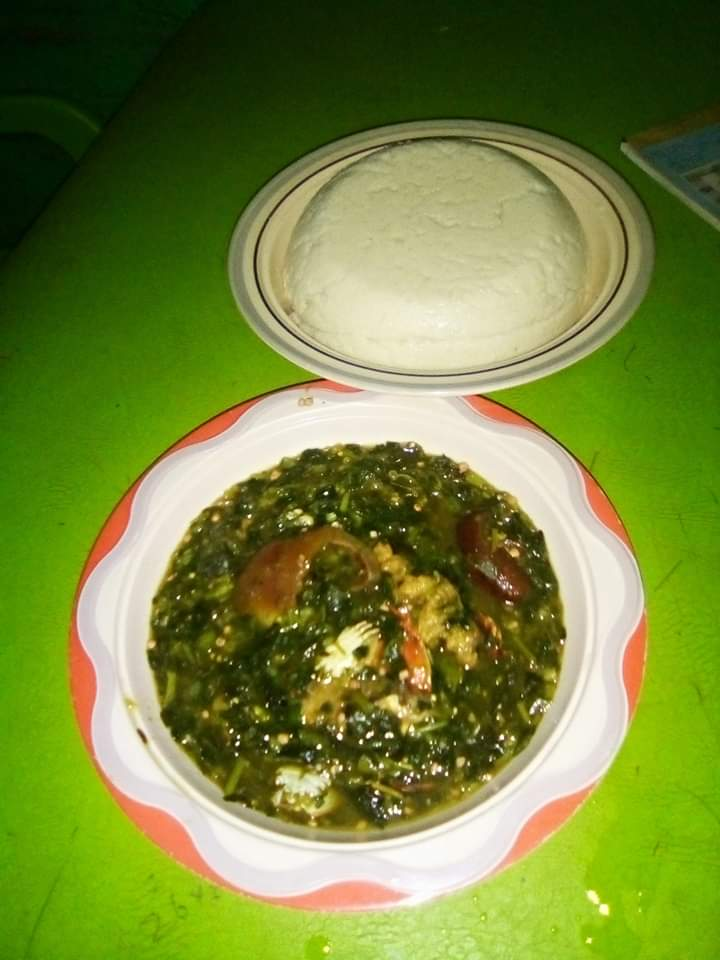
Akoumé with adémè sauce

- Djenkoumé: salty version, amiwɔ in Benin; maize dough cooked with salted water or meat broth, eaten plain with meat.
- Kom (dokounou): steamed balls of precooked, fermented whole-grain maize dough wrapped in corn husks; served with fried fish and a special roasted chili pepper (yébéssé fionfion). Kom is widely eaten in Ghana among Ewe people, known as kenkey in the Ga people language.

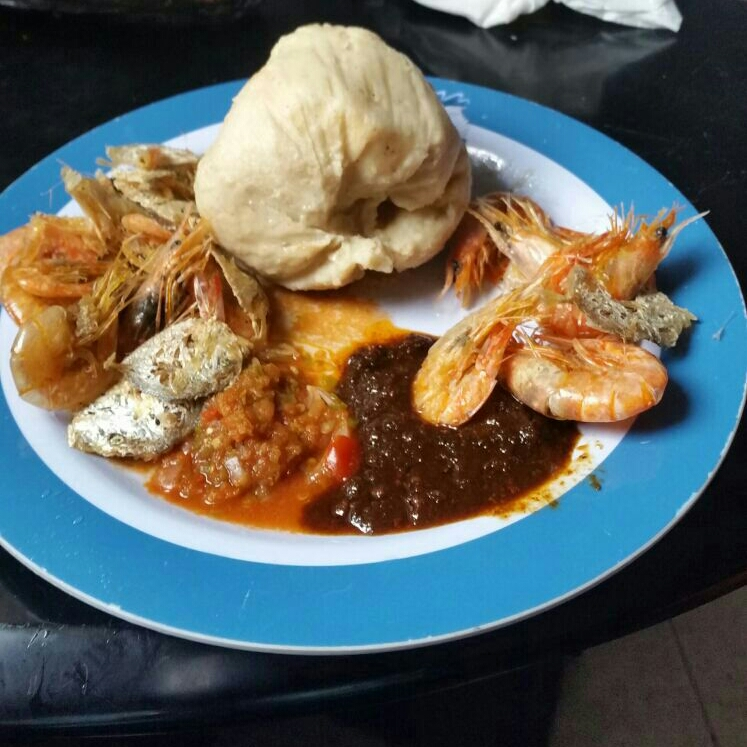
Kom with shrimp

- Ablo: steamed, slightly sweet maize pancake; also made with rice.
- Akpan: soft, slightly tangy ball of fermented whole maize flour, steamed in banana leaves.

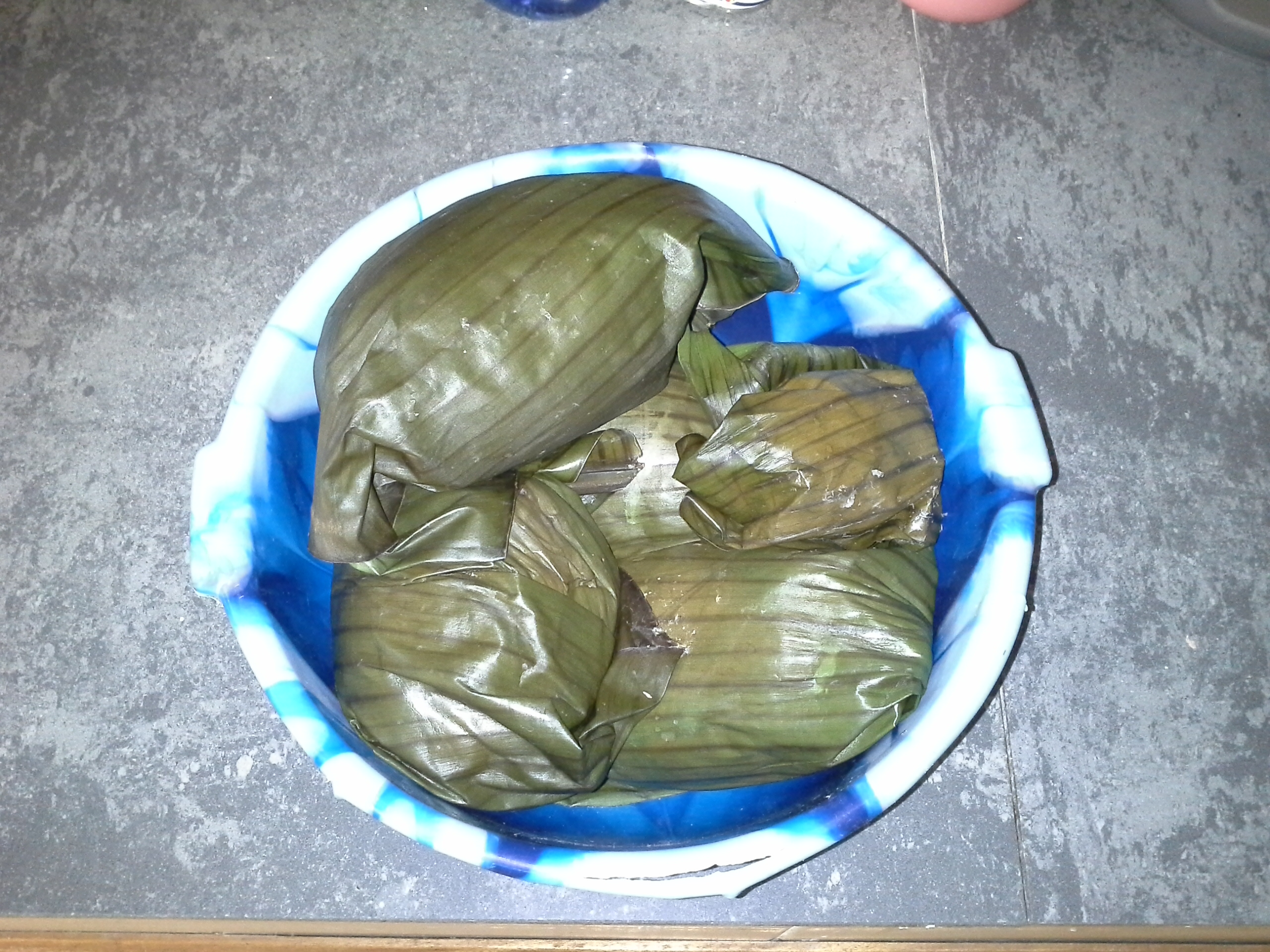
Akpan

- Egblin: ball made from very fermented maize cream, steamed in cassava leaves.
- Fufu or Fufuin: mash of boiled yam, cassava, plantain or taro, pounded to a light, elastic texture; eaten with clear fish or meat broth or with palm nut sauce (dékou déssi).

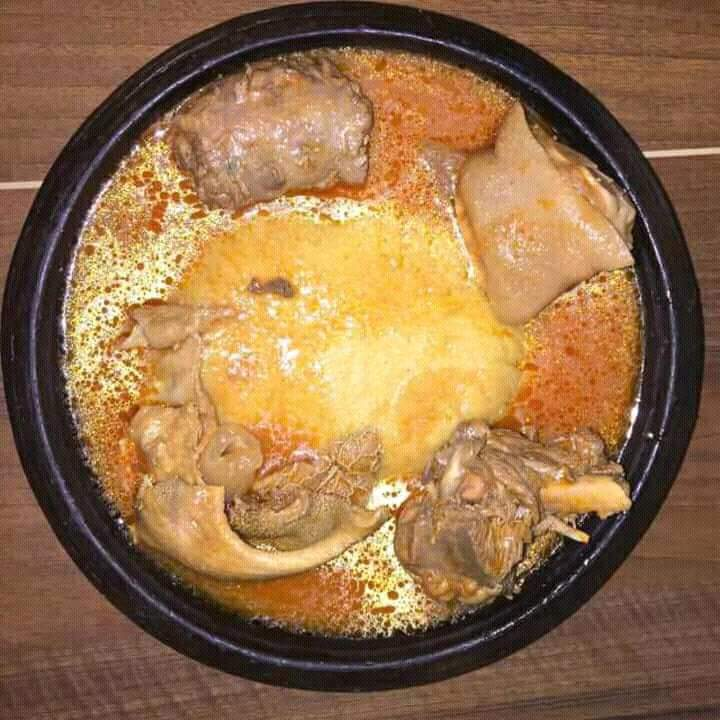
Fufu or Fufuin in Ewe/ Mina

== Beverages ==
- Authentic Togolese Drinks made with recipes passed down from generation to generation include a beautifully diversified range . Mainly called with the -ha suffix _from " Āhā " meaning Drink in Mina in the South, there are:
- Lihā, a fermented maize malt preparation, coloured with caramel, sweetened and served with ice cubes. The youngsters call it Togolese Malt, both from the richness of its dark colour and its refreshing fragrance. Lihā Is mostly sold as a street food you can quickly grab at a junction, the farmer market or local markets. Its sellers (mostly ladies because they tend to be more involved in the restauration business in the country) are called Lihātó literally lihā's owner a very common hailing word of vendors (_tó).
- Tchukutchu is another delicious drink with different recipes based on the cereal involved in the fermentation process hence there Is sorghum tchukutchu, maize tchukutchu and many more. The common feature of those drinks beyond the cool refreshing thirst-quenching-goodness on hot sunny days is the way they are served. Calabashes.Nature's ready-made bowls or better Treh as they are locale called. Treh are filled with broken ice pieces before addind the Tchukutchu to be enjoyed right on your feet then return the Treh to the vendor and get back to your business. However, nowadays plastic has taken a non deniable space on the streets and have almost replaced Treh both for time saving and take-away purposes.
- Sodabi is a distilled alcoholic liquor. Clear in appearance with a very sharp taste, Sodabi is the Togolese people's go-to appetizer. Served in tiny glasses, one or two shots taken before enjoying a hot Akumé and Ebésséssi or some gbomadessi just to name a few.
- Dehā is as the name suggests from De Tih. The Palm-Tree hence Palm Drink extracted from the stem of Palm Tree then prepared according to recipe. It has a whitey appearance.
- Alangban made from Baobab fruit Pulp into a thick and onctuous delight for the tongue.
- Ntitissi which Is fresh cooled squeezed lemons.
- Bissap as adapted from the Senegalese name which is made of dried hybiscus flowers. Alangban, Ntitissi, Bissap are Frozen in cute plastic packagings that make the experience last longer and a delight for children, marking the population's memories for a lifetime.
- Tchakpnot alo Is from North side. Another refreshing delight. Fermentation been the main preparation method, some drinks might turn slightly or highly alcoholic if desired.
- Akpansi
- Emasi. Even though the authentic drinks are bot commercialized in an industrial way, they remain one of togolese cuisine's pillars. The Brasserie du Bénin BB the soft drinks and beer factory present in the country handles most :
- Coca-Cola, Fanta
- Malta
- PomPom
- Cocktail de Fruit and Sprite production.
- Youki, in recent years has been the new taste innovation with different flavours of soft drinks. The highly known beers produced on the Land are:
- Eku
- Pils
- Lager which are mostly sold in bars, eateries and restaurants. Then, the imported variety from all across the world as:
- Sangria
- Red wine
- American-style beer
- White wine

== See also ==
- Benin cuisine
- Burkinabé cuisine
- Ghanaian cuisine
- List of African cuisines
