= Você Já Foi à Bahia? =

Brazilian song written by Dorival Caymmi

Song by Dorival Caymmi
- Released: 1941
- Genre: Samba
- Length: 3:16
- Songwriter: Dorival Caymmi

"Você Já Foi à Bahia?" (English: "Have You Been to Bahia?") is a Brazilian song written by Dorival Caymmi and first released in 1941. It was one of the year's most successful compositions. It gained international fame when it was featured in the Disney film The Three Caballeros.

== Cultural references ==
References are made in the song to Brazilian foods that are very popular in the Brazilian state of Bahia. Vatapá is a paste made out of bread, shrimp, coconut milk, ground peanuts, and palm oil. Caruru is a condiment made out of okra, onion, shrimp, palm oil, and toasted nuts. Mugunzá is a type of cornmeal with coconut. One part of the song says that if you want to samba you should go to Bahia. Samba is a very popular dance and musical genre that originated in Bahia. Another part of the song mentions São Salvador, which is the capital city of Bahia.

== The Three Caballeros ==
"Você Já Foi à Bahia?" was featured in the Disney film The Three Caballeros, under the English translation title "Have You Been to Bahia?" It is sung in the film by the Brazilian parrot, José Carioca. Parts of the song are still sung in its original Portuguese, while other parts are directly translated into English. The only major difference between Caymmi's original lyrics and those found in The Three Caballeros is that of whom the song addresses. The original lyrics are addressed to a "nega" or woman of African descent, while in The Three Caballeros, the song is addressed to Donald Duck. While Disney used many other pre-existing Latin American songs in their film, "Have You Been to Bahia?" is unique amongst them in that all of the other songs were either left completely untranslated or were retitled and received new English lyrics that were, generally, completely different from their original lyrics.

There are two sections of the song that are left untranslated in the movie. The first section could be translated:

Much luck it had
Much luck it has
Much luck it will have

The second untranslated section could be translated:

On the balconies of the two-story houses
Of old São Salvador
The memory of the maidens
In the time of the emperor
Everything, everything in Bahia
Makes people really want it
Bahia has a way
That no land has

Você Já Foi à Bahia? served as the film's title for its Brazilian release.
