= Akara =

Deep-fried bean cake

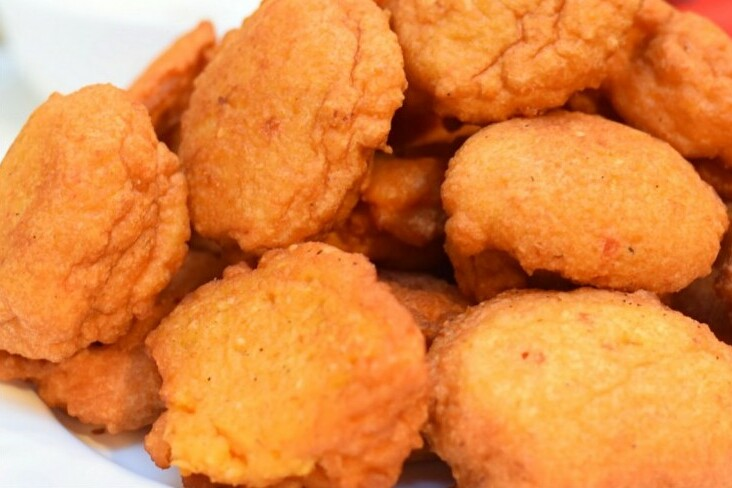
- Àkàrà in Nigeria
- Alternative names: Acara
- Course: Street food
- Place of origin: Yorubaland
- Associated cuisine: Nigeria, Benin, Togo
- Serving temperature: Hot
- Main ingredients: Beans, deep-fried in vegetable oil or palm oil

Akara (Yoruba: àkàrà; ) is a type of fritter made from cowpeas or beans (black-eyed peas) that originated in Yorubaland, from the Yoruba ethnic group inhabiting parts of Nigeria, Benin and Togo. It is sometimes referred to as "bean cake" in English. It is found throughout West African, Caribbean, and Brazilian cuisines.

Akara is the ancestor of Acarajé, traditionally found in Brazil's northeastern state of Bahia, especially in the city of Salvador. The dish was brought to Brazil by enslaved Yoruba citizens from West Africa, and can still be found in various forms in Nigeria, Benin and Togo.

== Description ==
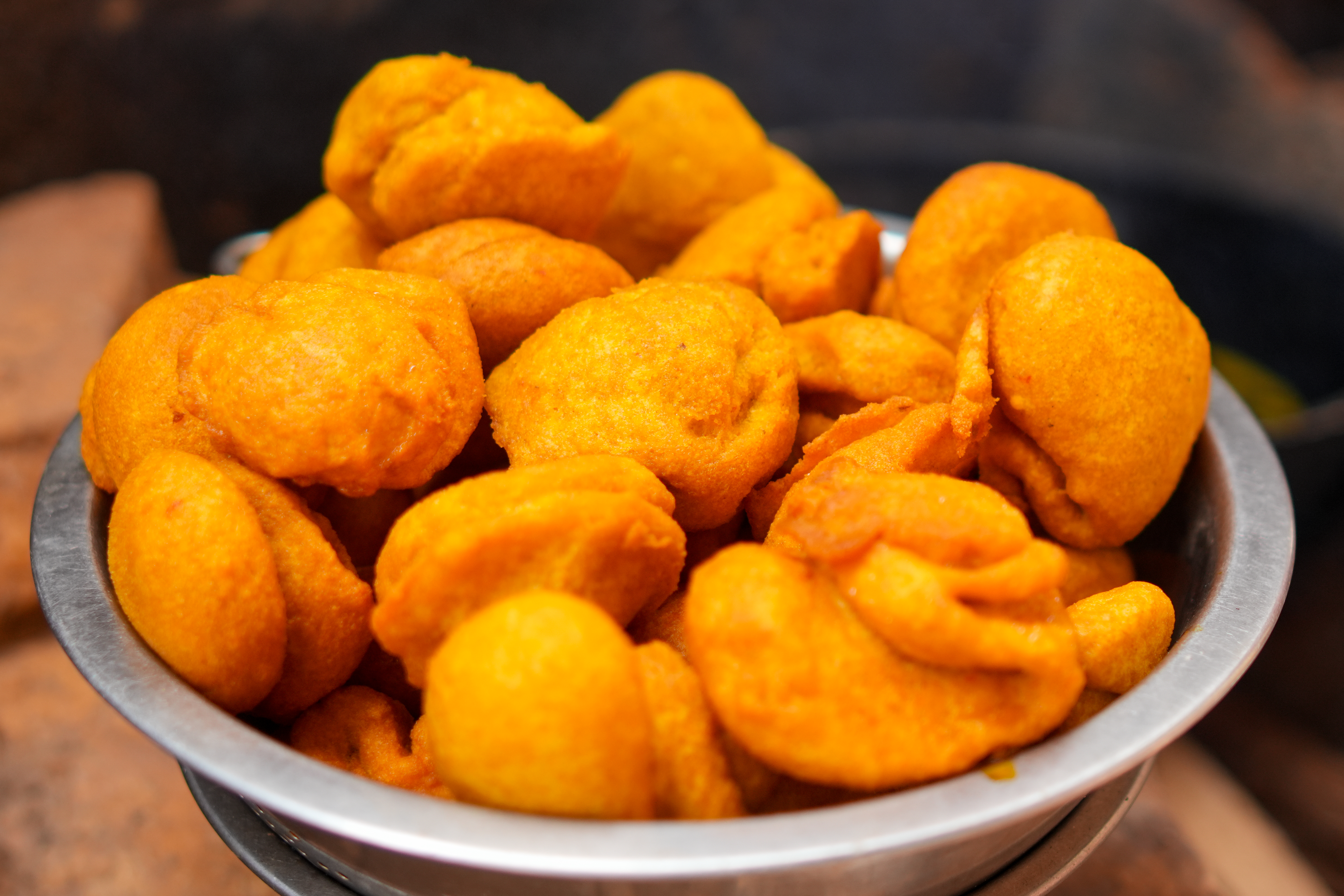
Akara

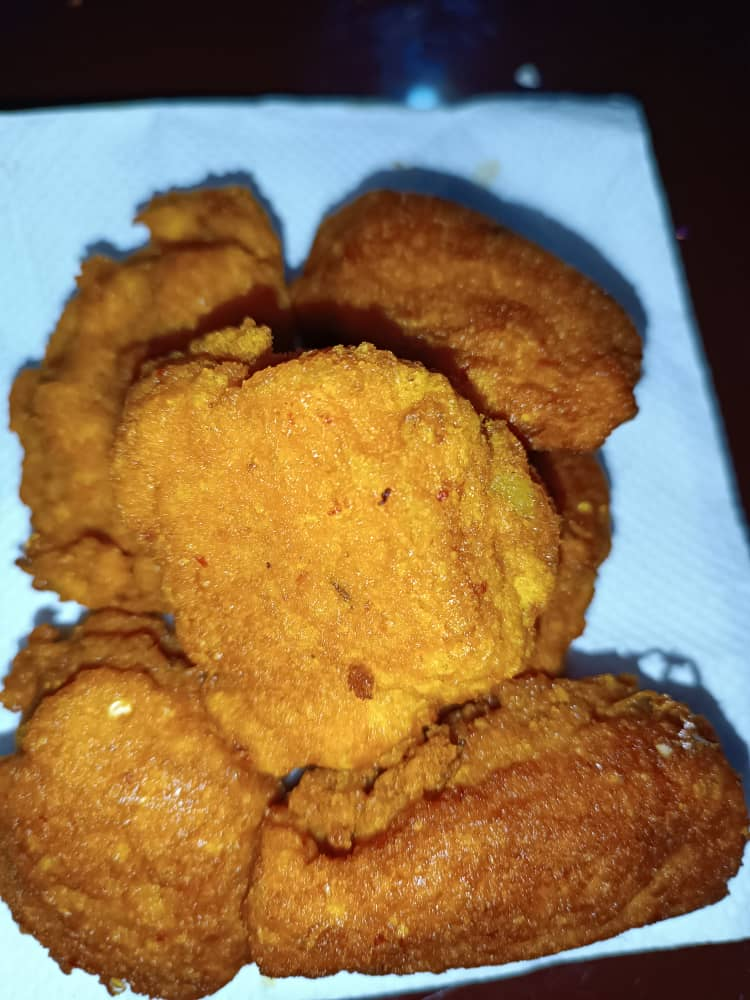
Akara Elepo

Akara is made from peeled beans (black-eyed peas), washed and ground with pepper, onions and other preferred seasonings, then beaten to aerate them, and deep-fried in small balls. Egg is an option added in some akara recipes into the batter. There are different types and variations of Akara. Akara is usually fried in vegetable oil (Ororo) or in palm oil (Epo). Palm oil fried akara is called akara kengbe or akara elepo, though between the two oil types, vegetable oil fried akara is more common as street food in Nigeria. The use of palm oil in akara elepo, gives it a taste difference from the more common Akara Olororo.

=== Variations ===
Akara Osu is another variant of Akara, from Osu town, fried in palm oil or vegetable oil, can be paler in colour than regular akara, and is lighter, puffy and airier, with onion slices, sliced bell pepper, shrimp and whole prawns (Ede) in it. Akara Senke is an akara that is made from using unpeeled Black-eyed peas. Other akara types includes Akara Awon (from beans and okro) and Egusi Akara (made from egusi seeds). Another type of Akara product is Akara Ogbomosho (Akara chips) which are crunchy chips.

=== In Brazil ===
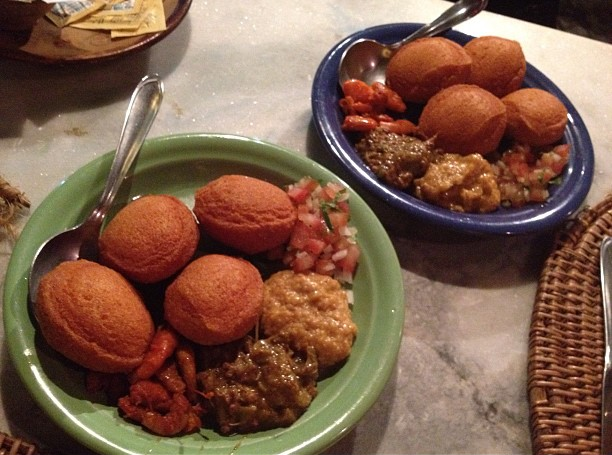
Acarajé

Brazilian acarajé is made from raw and milled cowpeas that are seasoned with salt, pepper and chopped onions molded into the shape of a large scone and deep-fried in dendê with a wok-like pan in front of the customers. It is served split in half and stuffed with vatapá and caruru – spicy pastes made from shrimp, ground cashews, palm oil and other ingredients. A vegetarian version is typically served with hot peppers and green tomatoes. Acarajé can also comes in a second form called abará, in which the ingredients are steamed instead of deep-fried, similar to moi moi.

Acarajé serves as both a religious offering to the gods in the Candomblé religion and as street food in Brazil.

== Etymology ==
Àkàrà is a Yoruba word meaning "pastry" or the dish itself. The Brazilian term acarajé, according to Márcio de Jagun, is derived from the phrase àkàrà n'jẹ, meaning "come and eat akara"; the phrase was used to call out to customers by women selling akara on the street.

== History ==
Akara plays a significant role in the Yoruba culture, as it is specially prepared when a person who has come of age (70 and above) dies. It is usually prepared in large quantities and distributed across every household close to the deceased. Akara also used to be prepared in large as a sign of victory, when warriors came back victorious from war. The women, especially the wives of the warriors, were to fry akara and distribute it to the villagers.

Akara is documented to also mean a variety of both bean/cowpea and non cowpea fritter in "A vocabulary of the Yoruba language" published 1852. Some dishes stated as type of Akara are mentioned : "Akara, s. bread, cake, of which latter there are various kinds. Akara-àwon, fancy cake made in imitation of a net. Akara-bọwọ-bọwọ, fancy cake made in imitation of a ring. Akara-fulẹ, a soft cake made of white beans and the vegetable ọccro. Akara-ku, a hard cake made of beans, and used by warriors for provision in their war expeditions. Bi ọ ba gbọ ogun mi, kì iduro din àkaraku, 'Whenever he hears of my war, he never waits to make provision.' This is said of a busy-body who rejoices at another’s trouble. Akara-lapata, cake made of Indian corn." Corn based Akara is mentioned in the text called Akara-lapata.

Akara (as known in southwest Nigeria) is a recipe taken to Brazil by the enslaved peoples from the West African coast. It is called "akara" by the Yoruba people of West Africa, "kosai" by the Hausa people of Nigeria, and "koose" in Ghana. It is a common breakfast dish, eaten with millet or corn pudding. In Nigeria, akara is commonly eaten with bread, custard, ogi (or eko), a type of cornmeal made with fine corn flour.

In Sierra Leone, akara is composed of rice flour, mashed banana, baking powder, and sugar. After mixed together, it is dropped in oil by hand, and fried, similar to puff-puff. It is then formed into a ball. Akara is usually prepared for events like Pulnado (event held due to the birth of a child), a wedding, funeral, or party.

== Nutrition ==
Akara is a good source of proteins, carbohydrates, vitamins and minerals such as calcium, iron and zinc, although its nutritional value is usually reduced by the presence of antinutritional factors such as phytates, fibers, lectins, polyphenols and tannins that affect minerals' bioavailability.

== See also ==
- Acarajé – Peeled beans formed into a ball and deep-fried in palm oil
- Calas – Creole rice fritters
- Cuisine of Nigeria – Culinary traditions of Nigeria
- Falafel – Middle Eastern fried bean dish
- List of African dishes
- List of legume dishes
- Vada – Category of savoury fried snacks from India
