= The Gathering =

The Gathering may refer to:

== Film and television ==
- The Gathering (1977 film), an American television film directed by Randal Kleiser
- The Gathering (1998 film), an American thriller film directed by Danny Carrales
- The Gathering (2003 film), a British thriller/horror film directed by Brian Gilbert
- The Gathering (miniseries), a 2007 American thriller starring Peter Fonda
- The Gathering (audio drama), a 2006 audio drama based on the television programme Doctor Who
- The Gathering, a contest among immortals in the Highlander franchise
- Babylon 5: The Gathering, the 1993 pilot movie for Babylon 5

=== TV episodes ===
- "The Gathering" (Gargoyles)
- "The Gathering" (Ghost Whisperer)
- "The Gathering" (Highlander: The Series), pilot
- "The Gathering" (Outlander)
- "The Gathering" (Star Wars: The Clone Wars)
- "The Gathering" (Torchwood)

== Literature ==
- The Gathering (Armstrong novel), a 2011 novel by Kelley Armstrong
- The Gathering (Carmody novel), a 1993 novel by Isobelle Carmody
- The Gathering (Carroll novel) or Sakkara, a 2006 New Heroes/Quantum Prophecy novel by Michael Carroll
- The Gathering (Enright novel), a 2007 novel by Anne Enright
- Al-Hashr, "The Gathering", 59th chapter (sura) of the Qur'an

== Music ==
- The Gathering (band), a Dutch rock band
- The Gathering, a New Zealand music festival

=== Albums ===
- The Gathering (Arbouretum album), 2011
- The Gathering (Caribbean Jazz Project album) or the title song, 2002
- The Gathering (Geri Allen album) or the title song, 1998
- The Gathering (Jorn album), 2007
- The Gathering (Magnum album), 2010
- The Gathering (Rashanim album), 2009
- The Gathering (Testament album), 1999
- The Gathering (compilation album), a Canadian collection of world music artists, 1991
- The Gathering (EP) or the title song, by Living Legends, 2008
- City on a Hill: The Gathering or the title song, from the City on a Hill series, 2003
- The Gathering, by Diane Schuur, 2011
- The Gathering, by Infected Mushroom, 1999
- The Gathering, by Kathryn Tickell, 1997
- The Gathering DVD (2005) and The Gathering album (2010), by Magenta
- The Gathering, a compilation of Irish traditional music featuring Andy Irvine and other artists, 1981

=== Songs ===
- "The Gathering", by Amorphis from The Karelian Isthmus, 1992
- "The Gathering", by Delain from Lucidity, 2005
- "The Gathering", by Freedom Call from The Circle of Life, 2005

=== Tours ===
- The Gathering, a 2026 tour featuring Weezer as the headlining artist

== Sports and games ==
- The Gathering (professional wrestling), an incarnation of the Raven's Nest stable
- Magic: The Gathering, a trading card game
- The Gathering, a live-action role-playing game event run by Lorien Trust
- The Gathering, a role-playing event at the Origins Game Fair managed by Paradigm Concepts

== Other uses ==
- Gathering of the Juggalos, or The Gathering, an annual festival
- The Gathering (LAN party), an annual computer party in Norway
- The Gathering 2009, an event celebrating Scottish culture
- The Gathering Ireland 2013, a tourism initiative for the Irish diaspora
- The Gathering, a 2005 stage show by Derren Brown

== See also ==
- Gathering (disambiguation)
