= Dinha do Acarajé =

Popular Brazilian street-food supplier (1951–2008)

- Born: Lindinalva de Assis; 20 May 1951; Salvador da Bahia, Brazil
- Died: 16 May 2008 (aged 56); Salvador da Bahia
- Occupation(s): Acarajé snack food producer and seller
- Years active: 45

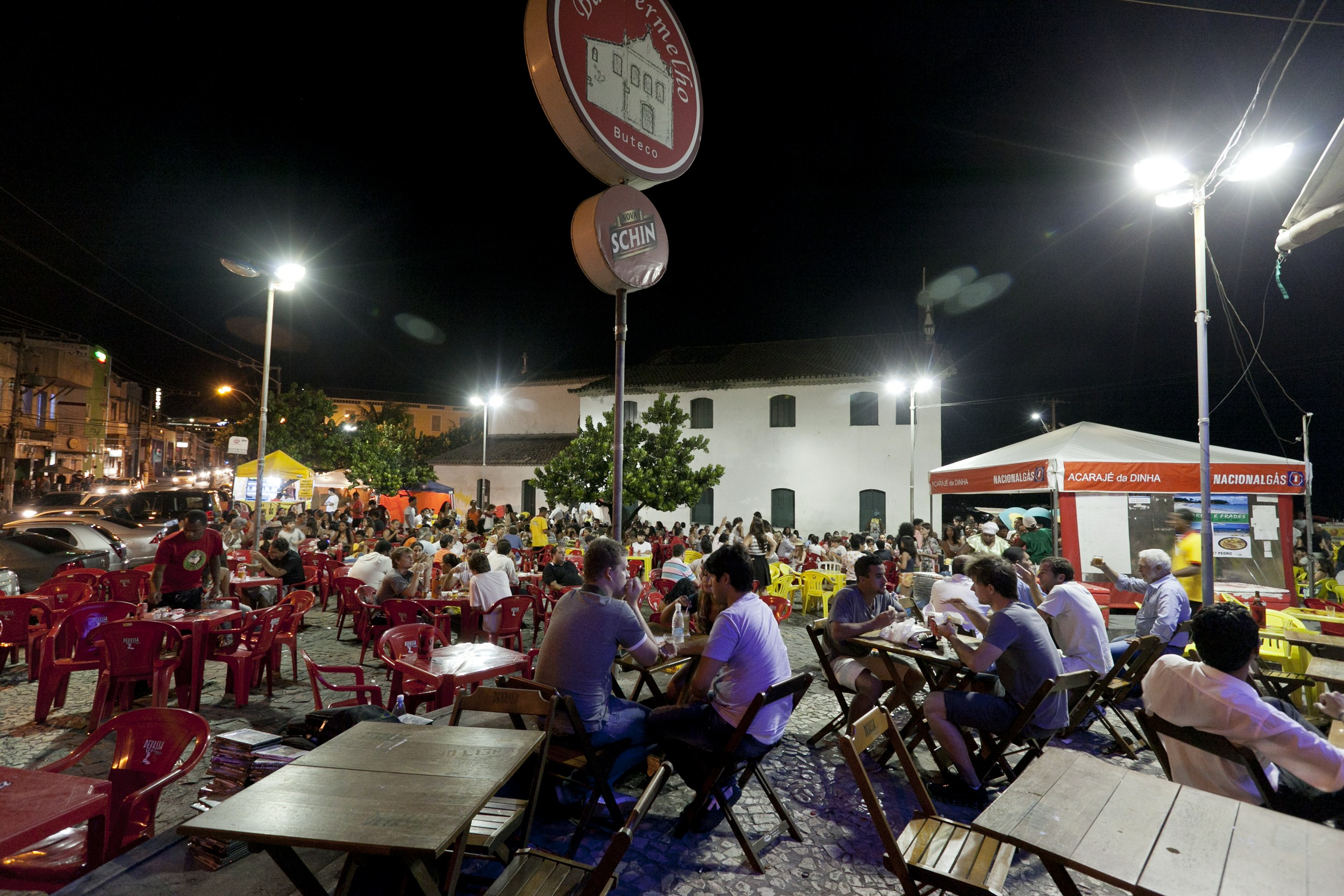
Acarajé da Dinha in 2012

Lindinalva de Assis, better known as Dinha do Acarajé (1951 – 2008), was the most famous maker in the Brazilian state of Bahia of the delicacy known as acarajé, a food of African origin made in Salvador da Bahia from cowpeas or beans and other ingredients, and fried in palm oil. It is served as a street food and also offered to the gods in the Candomblé religion.

== Early life ==
Dinha was born in Salvador on 20 May 1951. Her mother, Rute de Assis, died when she was four and she was then raised by her grandmother Ubaldina de Assis. Her grandmother was a pioneer in the art of acarajé who first established a kiosk to sell the snack in Largo de Santana in the bohemian Rio Vermelho neighbourhood of Salvador in around 1944. At the age of seven Dinha began to learn from her grandmother how to produce acarajé.

== Popularity ==
She sold acarajé from the age of ten. Her kiosk in Largo de Santana, known as Acarajé da Dinha, eventually became so popular that the Largo de Santana became known as the Largo da Dinha. In a state where there are believed to be around 3,000 women selling acarajé, she was credited with cooking the best and was called the "sovereign of Bahia" in an article in Folha de S.Paulo. In this article she was portrayed by journalist William Vieira: "She always wore a white lace dress, orixá beads running down her neck and her full lips painted and open in an all-white smile". Her tables were frequented by many national celebrities, including the singers Chico Buarque, Dorival Caymmi, Daniela Mercury, Jorge Benjor and Moraes Moreira, the motor-racing drivers Ayrton Senna Rubens Barrichello and Emerson Fittipaldi, the authors Jorge Amado and Zélia Gattai, the television presenter Chacrinha, and the actress and comedian Dercy Gonçalves.

She visited Argentina, Paraguay, Portugal, Spain, Italy, Switzerland, and France. In 1997 she was taken as a representative of Bahian cuisine to Monaco where she stayed for ten days and served the Monegasque royal family. In 1998, she fought what became known as the "acarajé war" with another cook, Regina dos Santos Pereira, dividing the opinion of Bahians. Pereira normally had a spot in the Graça neighbourhood but, that year, she decided to set-up about a hundred metres from her competitor, thus generating the dispute. In 1999, with continuing success, Dinha opened a formal restaurant called "Casa da Dinha", which also became a meeting point for intellectuals and tourists.

According to her biographer, Ubaldo Marques Porto Filho, Dinha was one of the main defenders of Bahian acarajé, and made a major contribution to it being listed by the National Institute of Historic and Artistic Heritage (IPHAN) as a Brazilian cultural heritage.

== Death ==
Dinha was admitted to the Hospital Aliança in Salvador with respiratory failure and, after six days there, she was discharged. However, on arriving home she had a relapse that took her back to the hospital where she died in the early hours of 16 May 2008. She had previously suffered from diabetes and hypertension.

After her death, her daughter, Cláudia de Assis, took over the acarajé kiosk, while her son, Edvaldo, took over the restaurant. In 2016, Cláudia also died, from lung cancer. Both mother and daughter were buried in the Jardim da Saudade cemetery of Salvador. Her younger daughter, Elaine, has continued the family tradition.
