= Egungun-oya =

Deity of divination in Yoruba mythology

In Yoruba tradition, Egungun-oya is a deity of divination. "Egungun" refers to the collective spirits of the ancestral dead; the Orisha Oya is seen as the mother of the Egungun.
