= Osu (town) =

Town in Osun State, Nigeria

Osu is an ancient town in Ijeshaland in Osun State, Nigeria.

== Location ==
Osu is situated between Ile-Ife and Ilesha, and being the headquarters of Atakunmosa West (Osun State) in Nigeria, about 356 km South West of Abuja, the country's capital city.

== Economy ==
Osun State is a flourishing and growing area of Nigeria thanks to the cocoa industry. Many migrant farmers from other parts of Nigeria have settled there. Osu is also one of the centres of cocoa production in the country.

Osu is also known for Akara Osu, a variation of the local delicacy, Akara. Akara Osu has a unique golden-brown exterior with a white interior.

The process of making Akara Osu was a multi-generational business for women in Osu. The women involved in the enterprise became very wealthy. Many mothers built their own houses and contributed to the academic progress of their dependents.

The construction of the express road, which passed through the town and opened up Osu to heavy traffic, contributed immensely in giving these women visibility. Travelers going to Ekiti, Ondo, both Northern and Eastern parts of Nigeria, now pass through Osu,

Gold from Ilesha is mined around the territories of Osu town. These territories are part of the territories under the control of Osu.

== History ==
Osu people originate from the Yoruba ethnic group, who have Ile Ife as their origin. They are all considered descendants of Oduduwa, the progenitor of the Yoruba race. The inhabitants of the town speak a unique dialect of Yoruba called Ijesha. The name "Osu" has been in existence for as long as eighteen centuries, but came into existence in 1850 after the Osu war that dispersed and deserted the first Oshu that occurred between the late 1830s to early 1840s ( see page 293 of History of Yoruba by Samuel Johnson). The town/village resurfaced in the 1850s through the amalgamation and resettlement of the various semi-compact settlements that are dotted around the expanse of the area called Osu today by then Owa Ofokutu. These semi-compact settlements were headed by Looyins that are Princes of Owa Obokun before the amalgamation.This war was between the Ibadan Warriors led by LADANU against the Ijesha, it was after the war that Owa Ofokutu resettled Osu in 1850, and the town has been experiencing peace with vast development compared to the 1850s of resettlement.

Short story of Osu in the Yoruba language by a native speaker

== People ==
- Majek Fashek (real name Majekodunmi Fasheke), reggae musician

== Climate ==
In Osu, the dry season is hot, muggy, and partly cloudy whereas the wet season is warm, oppressive, and overcast. The average annual temperature ranges from 18 °C (65 °F) to 34 °C (93 °F); it rarely falls below 16 °C (60 °F) or rises above 36 °C (97 °F).

=== Temperatures ===
From January 23 to April 4, the hot season, with an average daily high temperature above 90 °F, lasts for 2.4 months. In Osu, March is the hottest month of the year, with an average high of 91 °F and low of 73 °F.

The 3.8-month cool season, which runs from June 14 to October 7, has an average daily maximum temperature of less than 84 °F. With an average low of 70 °F and high of 82 °F, August is the coolest month of the year in Osu.

=== Clouds ===
In Osu, there is a substantial seasonal variation in the average amount of sky that is covered by clouds throughout the year.

Around November 16 marks the start of Osu's clearer season, which lasts for 2.9 months and ends around February 13.

In Osu, December is the clearest month of the year, with the sky remaining clear, mostly clear, or partly cloudy 51% of the time on average.

Beginning around February 13 and lasting for 9.1 months, the cloudier period of the year ends around November 16.

The cloudiest month in Osu is April, when the sky is overcast or mostly cloudy 86% of the time on average.

=== Precipitation ===
A day that has at least 1.0 millimetre (0.04 inches) of liquid or liquid-equivalent precipitation is considered to be wet. In Osu, the likelihood of rainy days fluctuates wildly throughout the year.

From April 9 to October 27 (the length of the wetter season), there is a greater than 44% chance that any particular day will be rainy. In Osu, September has an average of 25.4 days with at least 1.0 millimetre (0.04 inches) of precipitation, making it the month with the most wet days.

From October 27 to April 9, or 5.4 months, is the dry season. With an average of 1.3 days with at least 1.0 millimetre (0.04 inches) of precipitation, December is the month in Osu with the fewest wet days.

With an average of 25.4 days, September is the month in Osu with the most rainy days. According to this classification, rain is the most frequent type of precipitation throughout the year, with a peak likelihood of 86% in September.
