= Vatapá =

Afro-Brazilian dish

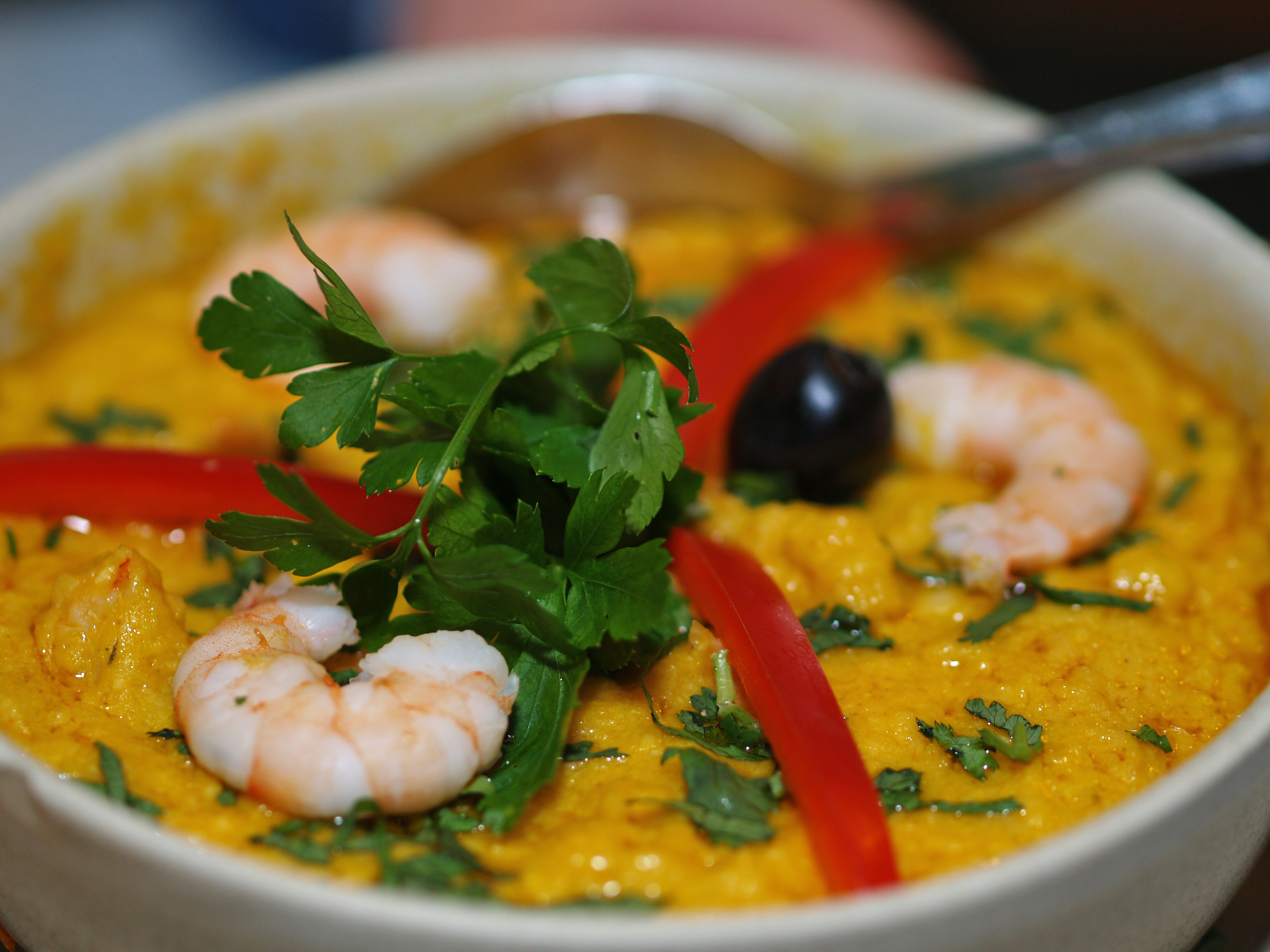
- Place of origin: Brazil
- Main ingredients: Bread, shrimp, coconut milk, peanuts, palm oil

Vatapá (Yoruba: Ẹ̀bà Tápà), [vɐtɐˈpa] is an Afro-Brazilian dish made from bread, shrimp, coconut milk, finely ground peanuts and palm oil mashed into a creamy paste. It is a typical food of Salvador, Bahia, and it is also common to the North and Northeast regions of Brazil. In the northeastern state of Bahia it is commonly eaten with acarajé, and as a ritual offering in Candomblé, with acaçá or acarajé. Vatapá is often eaten with white rice in other regions of Brazil.

== Etymology ==
"Vatapá" is derived from the term Yoruba words: Ẹ̀bà Tápà.

== Origin ==
Vatapá is of West African origin and arrived in Brazil through the Yoruba people under the name of ehba-tápa.

It is a typical dish of the northeastern cuisine and very traditional in the state of Bahia, where dendê (unrefined red palm oil) is a key ingredient and the dish is frequently served with caruru.

== In popular culture ==
The 1957 song "Vatapá" by Brazilian songwriter Dorival Caymmi is named for the dish. The lyrics contain the recipe for the dish, listing the key ingredients and providing basic instructions for its preparation. The song was later covered by Gal Costa, appearing on her tribute album of Caymmi's songs, Gal Canta Caymmi (1976).

Vatapá is also mentioned in the 1941 song "Você Já Foi à Bahia?" (English: "Have You Been to Bahia?"), written by Dorival Caymmi, where it is named, alongside caruru and munguzá, as a specialty of Bahia. A partially-translated version of this song appeared in the 1944 live-action and animated film The Three Caballeros, produced by Walt Disney, in which it is sung by José Carioca in an attempt to convince Donald Duck to visit Bahia.

== See also ==
- Acaraje
- Matapa
- Açorda
- List of Brazilian dishes
