= Gather =

Gather, gatherer, or gathering may refer to:

== Anthropology and sociology ==
- Hunter-gatherer, a person or a society whose subsistence depends on hunting and gathering of wild foods
- Intensive gathering, the practice of cultivating wild plants as a step toward domestication
- Harvesting crops

== Craftwork ==
- Gather (sewing), an area where fabric is folded or bunched together with thread or yarn
- Gather (knitting), a generic term for one of several knitting techniques to draw stitches closer together
- Gathering (bookbinding), a number of sheets of paper folded and sewn or glued as a group into a bookbinding

== Gathering ==
- Gathering, any type of party or meeting, including:
  - Bee (gathering), an old term which describes a group of people coming together for a task
  - Salon (gathering), a party associated with French and Italian intellectuals
- Global gathering, a music festival in the United Kingdom
- Rainbow Gathering
- Ricochet Gathering, a music event in the United States
- Tribal Gathering, a music festival in the United Kingdom
- Gathering (album), an album by Josh Ritter
- Gathering (animation studio), a defunct Japanese animation studio
- Gathering (LDS Church), a doctrine of the Latter Day Saints

== Other ==
- Gather (film), a 2020 documentary film about Native American foodways
- Gatherers (band), an American melodic hardcore band
- "Gatherings" (Spaced), a television episode
- Gathering of Developers, sometimes called as 'Gathering'
- Rag gatherer, an archaic occupation, also known as rag picker
- Gather.com, a social networking website
- "Gather", song from All the Light Above It Too

== See also ==
- Gathers, surname
- The Gathering (disambiguation)
- Meeting
