= Gathers =

Gathers is a surname. Notable people with the surname include:

- Hank Gathers (1967–1990), American basketball player
- James Gathers (1930–2002), American sprinter
- Rico Gathers (born 1994), American basketball player

== See also ==
- Mathers, surname
