= Sodabi =

Palm wine liquor popular in Benin

Sodabi is a homemade alcohol obtained by distilling palm wine. It is a traditional beverage in many tropical regions and is widely consumed in West Africa. It goes by different names depending on the country, with the term "sodabi" being mainly used in Benin and Togo, where it holds an important place in daily life and religious practices.

Its other names in West Africa are:

- Cameroon: odontol or hâ;
- Ivory Coast: koutoukou;
- Ghana: akpeteshie;
- Nigeria: ogogoro.

== History ==
The history of sodabi belongs to oral tradition, which is why there are multiple hypotheses regarding its origins. However, two main theories are frequently mentioned:

According to the first theory, an Englishman doubted that Beninese people could produce an alcohol similar to gin. After taking a sip, he allegedly exclaimed, "So that be" ("So be it"), admitting he was wrong. However, the locals (who were not English speakers) misheard it as "Sodabi" and decided to name the drink accordingly. While this version of the story is likely false, it remains the most popular explanation for the origin of the name "Sodabi."

The second theory attributes the name Sodabi to its inventors, the Sodabi brothers. These two Beninese men from Allada were enlisted in the French colonial regiments during World War I. During their time in Europe, they learned distillation techniques, which they brought back to Benin after the 1918 armistice. They built a homemade still and attempted their first distillation using fermented bananas. The result was not convincing, so they tried again with pineapples before finally choosing palm wine, a well-known and widely consumed local beverage for centuries. This second attempt was a resounding success, and the technique of making alcohol from palm wine quickly spread throughout Benin and Togo in the 1930s.

In 1931, the colonial administration decided to ban sodabi production, officially for health reasons. However, economic motives may have played a role as well, since sodabi was competing with imported European spirits, posing a financial threat. This ban had little effect, as clandestine distilleries continued to thrive during that period—and still do today.

== Elaboration ==
In West Africa, sodabi is mainly produced using traditional methods, except for a handful of companies attempting to manufacture it on an industrial scale.

The base of sodabi is palm wine, which is obtained through the natural fermentation of palm sap extracted from various species: the African oil palm (Elaeis guineensis), raffia palm (Raphia vinifera), or palmyra palm (Borassus aethiopium). After harvesting, the sap is sometimes left to rest for up to three days to allow fermentation to increase the alcohol content to 3–6%.

Next, the palm wine is heated in a pot. The alcohol vapors are channeled through a pipe that passes through a container filled with cold water, where condensation occurs. The alcohol then returns to liquid form and can be collected. A second distillation is sometimes performed. Today, clay containers are often replaced by metal drums.

Once the alcohol is prepared, roots or plants are often infused to add flavor or medicinal properties to the sodabi.

== In culture ==
More than just an ordinary alcohol, sodabi is an essential component of Beninese culture. It is present at all religious and family ceremonies, as well as in daily life.

It is common to share a glass of sodabi with guests as a sign of hospitality and respect. The first glass is sometimes poured onto the ground, accompanied by a few words of prayer or a blessing.

It is also common to offer a glass of sodabi, or sometimes even a whole bottle, as a token of thanks for a favor or to celebrate the signing of a contract.

Sodabi is an integral part of the Vodun religion; indeed, it is used repeatedly in rituals. For example, it is customary to pour sodabi onto the ground in front of a fetish as an offering, to thank it for a favor granted or to ask it to fulfill a request.

In Vodun, the deities have varying degrees of appreciation for sodabi. For instance, the deities Hébieso and Sakpata receive sodabi offerings, unlike the Dan or Tchamba, for example. One of the most spectacular rituals involving Hébieso is called the "war kitchen." It involves heating a large amount of red oil in a big pot until it ignites. Sodabi is then poured into the burning oil, creating a massive burst of flames symbolizing the gunshot of Hébieso.

In 2018, the beverage was exported to the east coast of the United States as a 45-degree alcohol under the label Tambour Original, product of Benin.

In 2019, globetrotter and comedian Bruno Blanchet drew attention to sodabi during a television series about Benin.

In 2017, sodabi remained predominantly handcrafted with rudimentary equipment, which increased the risks of producing adulterated alcohol and posed health concerns. Some countries even went as far as banning its consumption due to public health reasons.

Recently, some companies have shown interest in sodabi and are attempting to modernize its production using industrial methods. For example: Distillerie Béninoise in Benin with its Tambour Original sodabi, NeHo Likors in Togo with its flavored sodabis, Caliendi Liqueur also in Togo, King of Soto, AHA YIN, and Anamero, Black Old Man in Togo.

== Commercial production ==
Today, several companies have started large scale production of the drink for export to other parts of the world.
