= Acarajé =

Peeled beans formed into a ball and deep-fried in palm oil

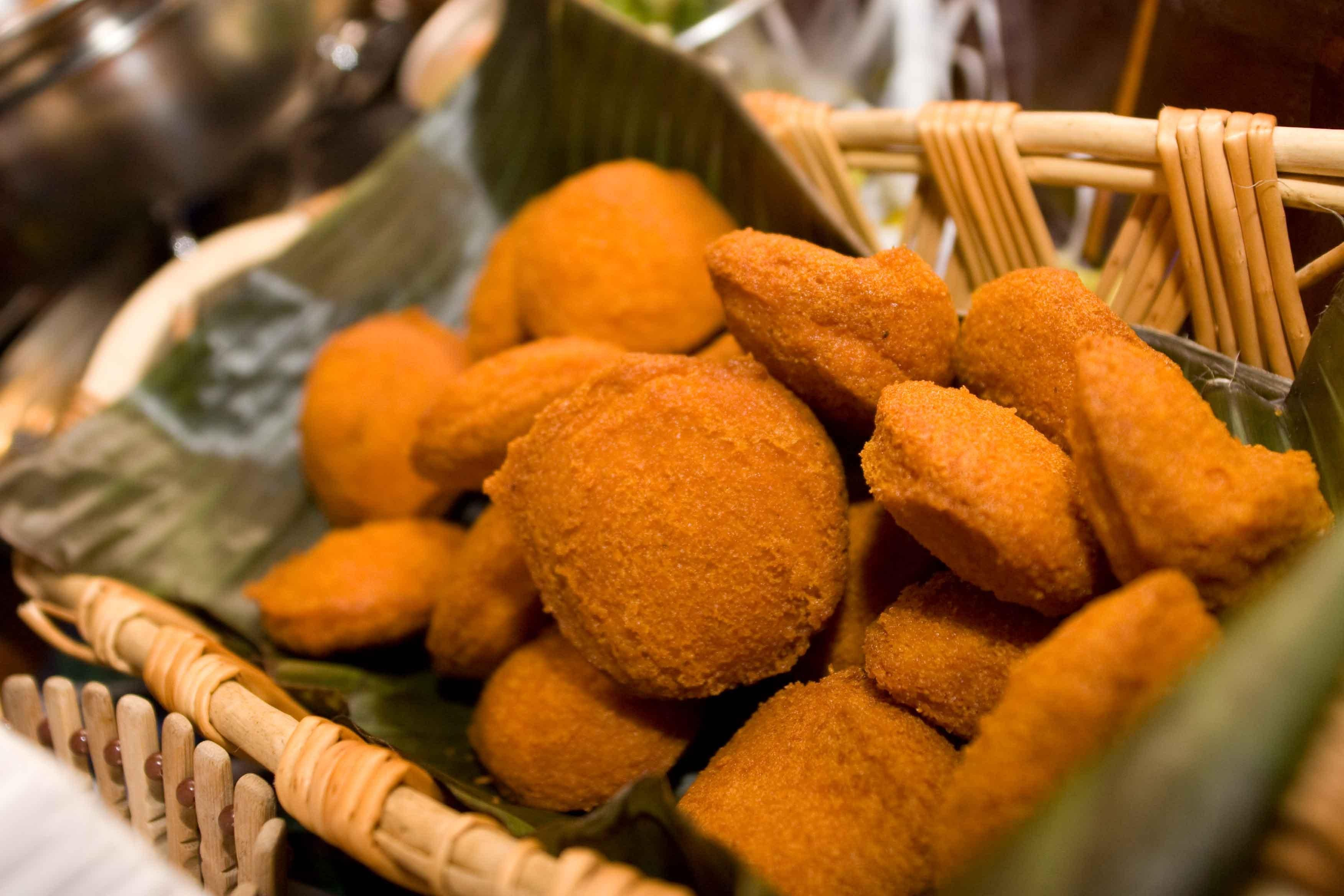
- Acarajé in Salvador, Brazil
- Course: Street food
- Region or state: West Africa and South America
- Associated cuisine: Brazil
- Serving temperature: Hot
- Main ingredients: Black eyed peas, deep-fried in dendê (palm oil)

Acarajé (Portuguese: acarajé, pronounced [akaɾaˈʒɛ]) is a type of fritter made from cowpeas or beans (black-eyed peas) fried in dendê (palm oil). This dish is descended from Akara which originated in Yorubaland, from the Yoruba ethnic group inhabiting parts of Nigeria, Benin and Togo. The dish was then brought to Brazil by enslaved Yoruba citizens from West Africa. Acarajé is traditionally encountered in Brazil's northeastern state of Bahia, especially in the city of Salvador. Acarajé serves as both a religious offering to the gods in the Candomblé religion and as street food.

== Description ==
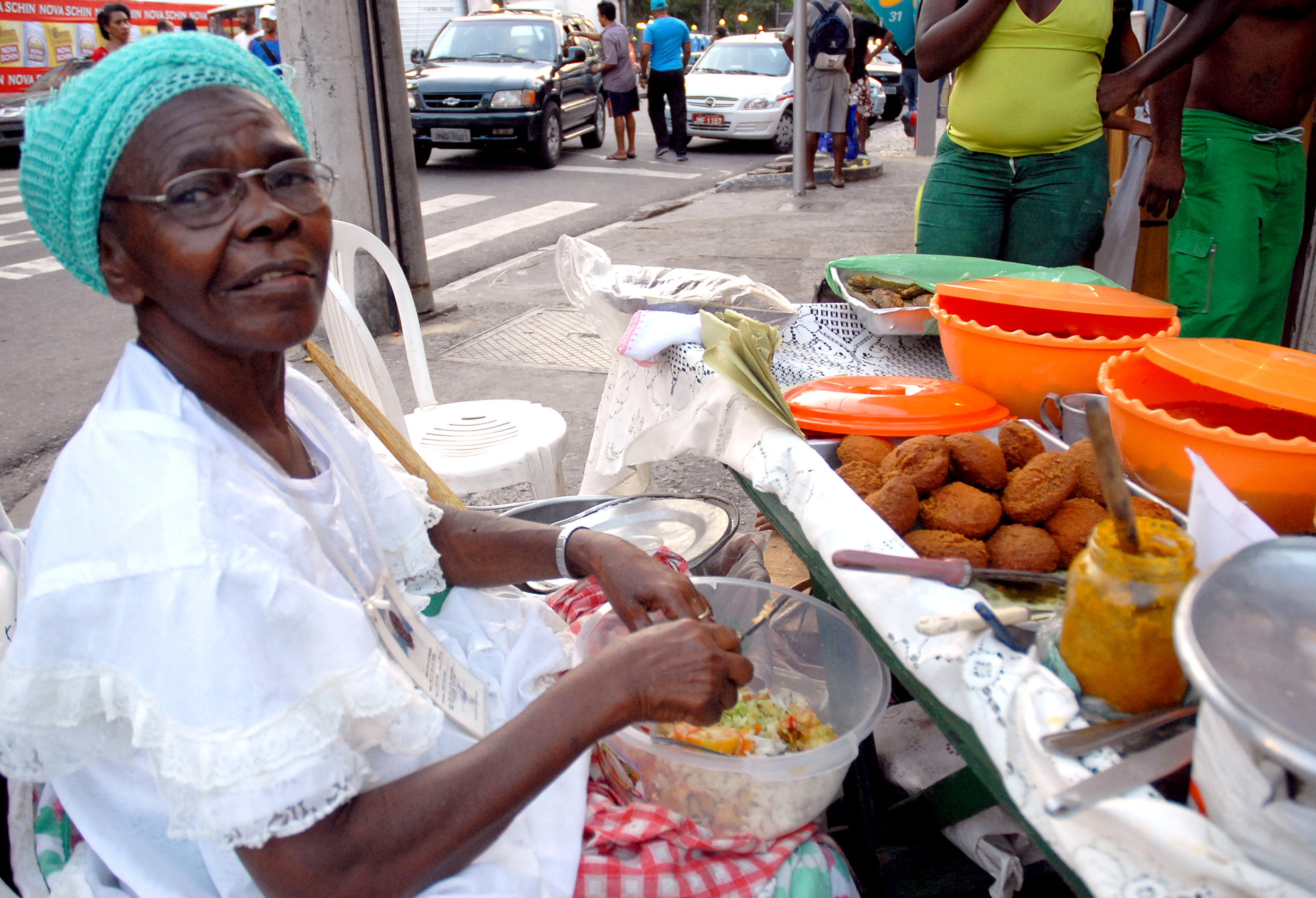
Baiana selling acarajé on the streets of Salvador, Brazil.

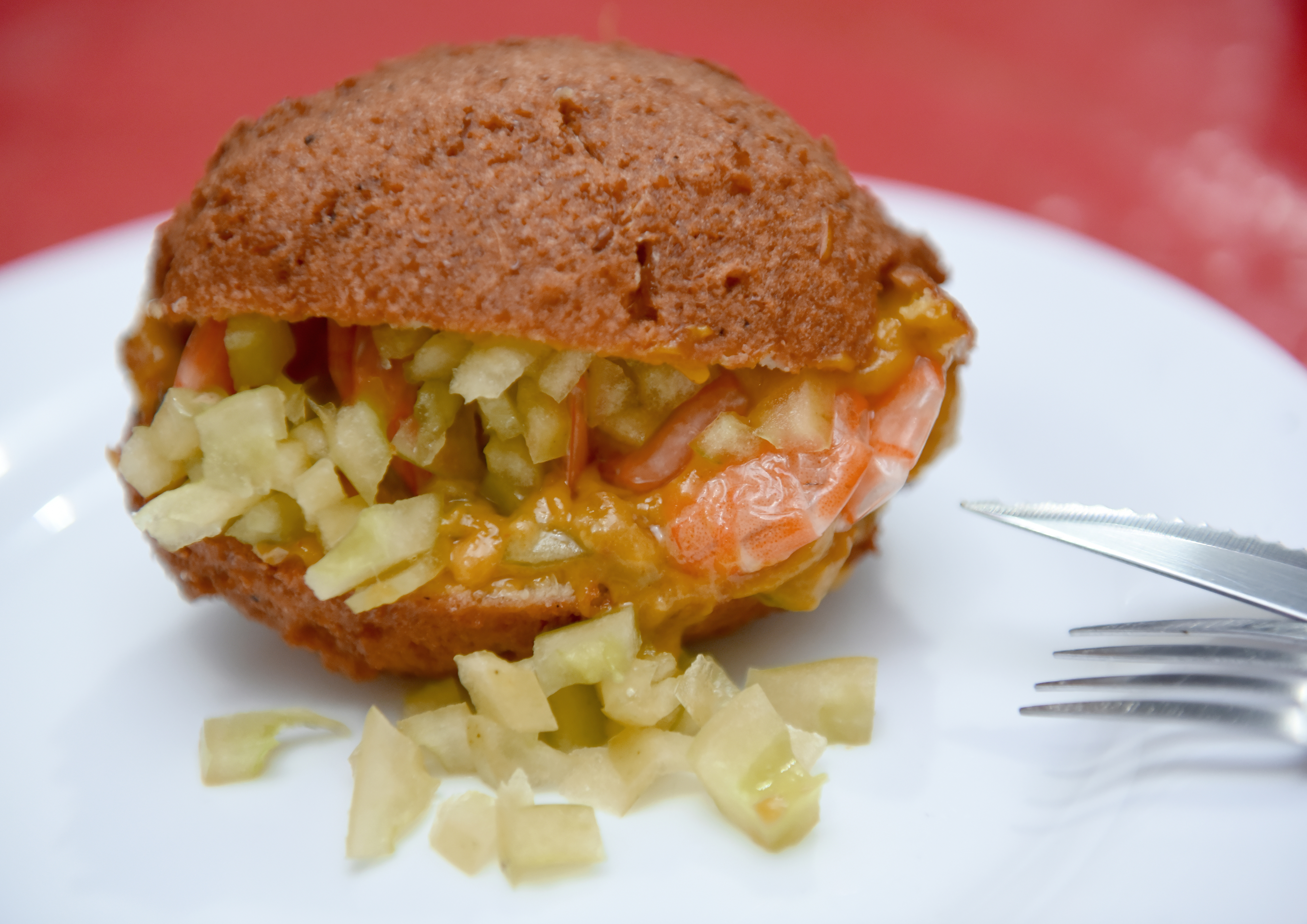
Filled acarajé

Brazilian acarajé is made from raw and milled cowpeas that are seasoned with salt, pepper and chopped onions molded into the shape of a large scone and deep-fried in dendê with a wok-like pan in front of the customers. It is served split in half and stuffed with vatapá and caruru – spicy pastes made from shrimp, ground cashews, palm oil and other ingredients. A vegetarian version is typically served with hot peppers and green tomatoes. Acarajé can also comes in a second form called abará, in which the ingredients are steamed instead of deep-fried, similar to moi moi.

== In Brazilian Culture ==
Today in Bahia, Brazil, most street vendors who serve acarajé are women, known as Baianas do Acarajé, easily recognizable by their all-white cotton dresses and headscarves and caps. They first appeared in Bahia selling acarajé in the 19th century. Historically, earnings from the sale of acarajé were used for a variety of reasons including to supplement income and in some cases to buy the freedom of enslaved family members until the abolition of slavery in Brazil in 1888. The city now has more than 500 acarajé vendors. The image of these women, often simply called baianas, frequently appears in artwork from the region of Bahia. Acarajé, however, is available outside of the state of Bahia as well, including the streets of its neighboring state of Sergipe, and the markets of Rio de Janeiro.

=== Protected status ===
Acarajé was listed as a national intangible historic heritage (patrimônio nacional imaterial), by the National Institute of Historic and Artistic Heritage in 2004; the role of baianas in the preparation and sale of acarajé was recognized in the same act. In October 2023, Rio de Janeiro declared the fritter to be part of that city's cultural heritage.

== In Candomblé ==
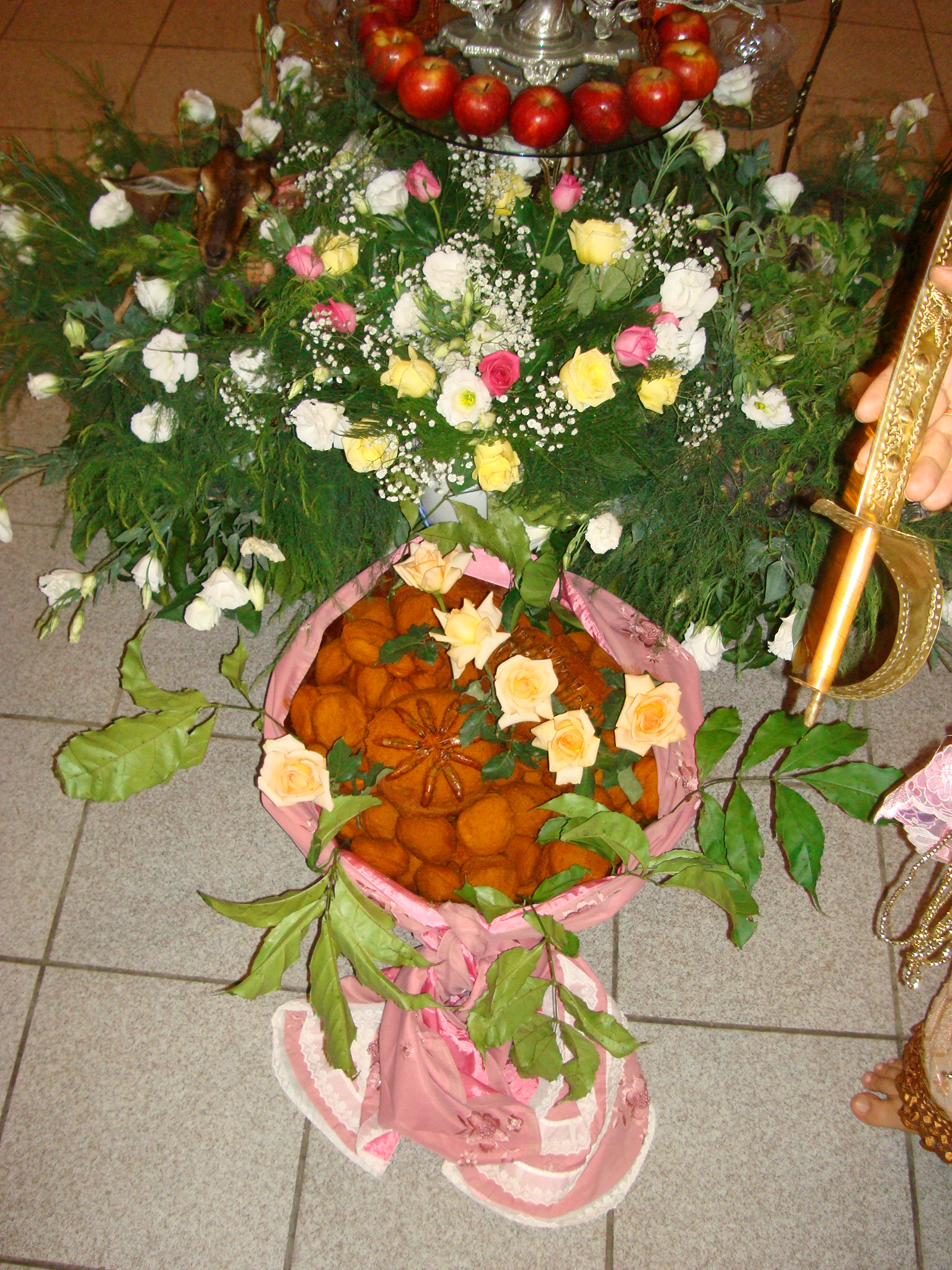
Acarajé in a Candomblé ritual context

Acarajé is essential ritual food used in Afro-Brazilian religious traditions such as Candomblé. The first acarajé in a Candomblé ritual is offered to the orixá Exu. They vary in size based on their offering to a specific deity: large, round acarajé are offered to Xangô; ones smaller in form are offered to Iansã. Small, fritter-size acarajé are offered to Erê, or child spirits. Acarajé is used in Candomblé rituals in the states of Bahia, Rio de Janeiro, São Paulo, Pernambuco, Alagoas, Sergipe, and Maranhão. It is closely related to acaçá, a similar ritual food made of steamed corn mush.

=== Acarajé de azeite-doce ===
Acarajé de azeite-doce is a variety of acarajé fried in an oil other than palm oil; olive oil or other vegetable oils are generally used. Acarajé de azeite-doce is used in Candomblé offerings to orixás with a ritual prohibition of the use of palm oil. This variety is found in the states of Bahia and Rio de Janeiro.

=== Acarajé de Xangô (Sango) ===
Acarajé de Xangô (àkàrà tí Ṣàngó) is a variety of acarajé offered to the orixá Xangô, known as the òriṣà Ṣangó in the Yoruba culture. It is made of the same ingredients as the common form but greatly elongated. This variety is found on the ritual platter of amalá offered to Xangô. This variety is found in the state of Bahia and in Rio de Janeiro.

== In popular culture ==
- Acarajé was featured on the Netflix TV series Street Food volume 2, which focused on Latin American street foods.
- The song No Tabuleiro da Baiana, written by Ary Barroso and famously recorded by João Gilberto, Maria Bethânia, Caetano Veloso, and Gilberto Gil, references acarajé, abará, vatapá, and caruru.

== See also ==
- Akara – Deep-fried bean cake
- Vatapá – Afro-Brazilian dish
- Dinha do Acarajé – Popular Brazilian street-food supplier (1951–2008)
- Brazilian cuisine
- List of Brazilian dishes
- List of legume dishes
