= Akpan (dessert) =

Type of yogurt

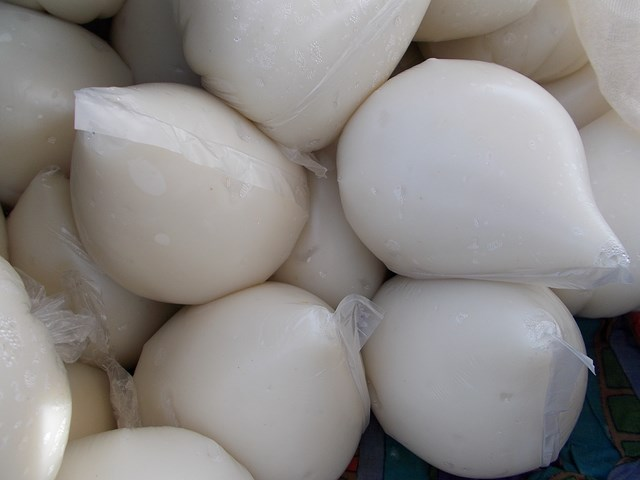
- Bags of fermented maize yogurt, akpan
- Alternative names: Akassa
- Type: Dessert
- Place of origin: Togo, Benin
- Region or state: West Africa, France
- Main ingredients: Fermented maize
- Ingredients generally used: Condensed milk

Akpan, also known as akassa, is a fermented maize yogurt. A product of Togolese and Beninese cuisine, it is considered a dessert.

== Preparation ==
Akpan is made by fermenting maize kernels or powder. The fermented maize is then bagged together with condensed milk and iced to create a sweet dessert. Some sources describe the dish as vegetable yogurt.

The dessert is popular in Benin and Togo. In Benin, the dish is referred to as Akassa. It has a small consumer base in France.
