= Caruru (food) =

Brazilian condiment

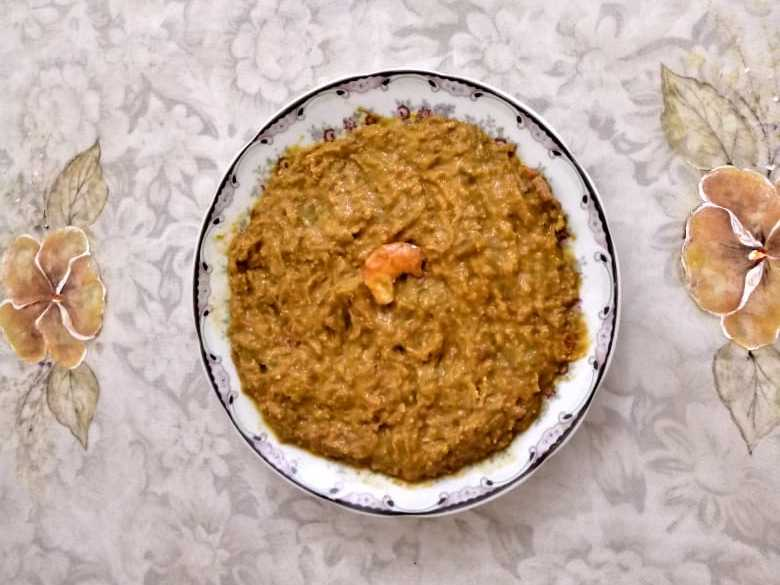
Caruru

Caruru (Brazilian Portuguese: [kaɾu'ɾu]) is a Brazilian food made from okra, onion, shrimp, palm oil and toasted nuts (peanuts and/or cashews). It is a typical condiment in the northeastern state of Bahia, where it is commonly eaten with acarajé, an Afro-Brazilian street food made from mashed black-eyed peas formed into a ball and then deep-fried in palm oil.

== Etymology ==
Caruru possibly comes from the African term kalalu. Another possibility is that it is a Tupi noun, ka'á-riru (lit.: "eating herb"), as defined by the Brazilian folklorist Luís da Câmara Cascudo. It is a curious case of similar words, which generate some confusion between the plant and the dish.

== Origin ==
Guilherme Piso, who lived in Pernambuco (1638–1644), reports the caruru made with medicinal and food herb (and not with okra). In his story in Historia Naturalis Brasiliae, the doctor from Count Maurício de Nassau informs that "this bredo (caruru) is eaten as a vegetable and cooked instead of spinach ...". Another account, in 1820, in the Amazon, by Von Martius, mentions the "caruru-açu" during a meal with the natives near the Madeira River, when he experienced "a delicacy of chestnuts pounded with an herb similar to spinach ..." . In other words: this description is of a caruru made with the caruru plant, originally from the Americas (and not from Africa, which is the case of okra). For the dish, the cuisine of Dahome Nagô, from Yoruba Nigeria, and indigenous from Bahia would have been combined. During his visit to Africa, at the end of the 18th century, Father Vicente Ferreira Pires called the meal in Daomé "chicken caruru", revealing that the use of oil palm, a palm of African origin. Originally, the Brazilian caruru was a stew of herbs that served to accompany another dish (meat or fish). The current version of the caruru, however, is more African than indigenous, being made with okra, chili, dried shrimp and palm oil.

== See also ==
- Callaloo
- Vatapá
- List of Brazilian dishes
