= Amiwo =

Beninese porridge

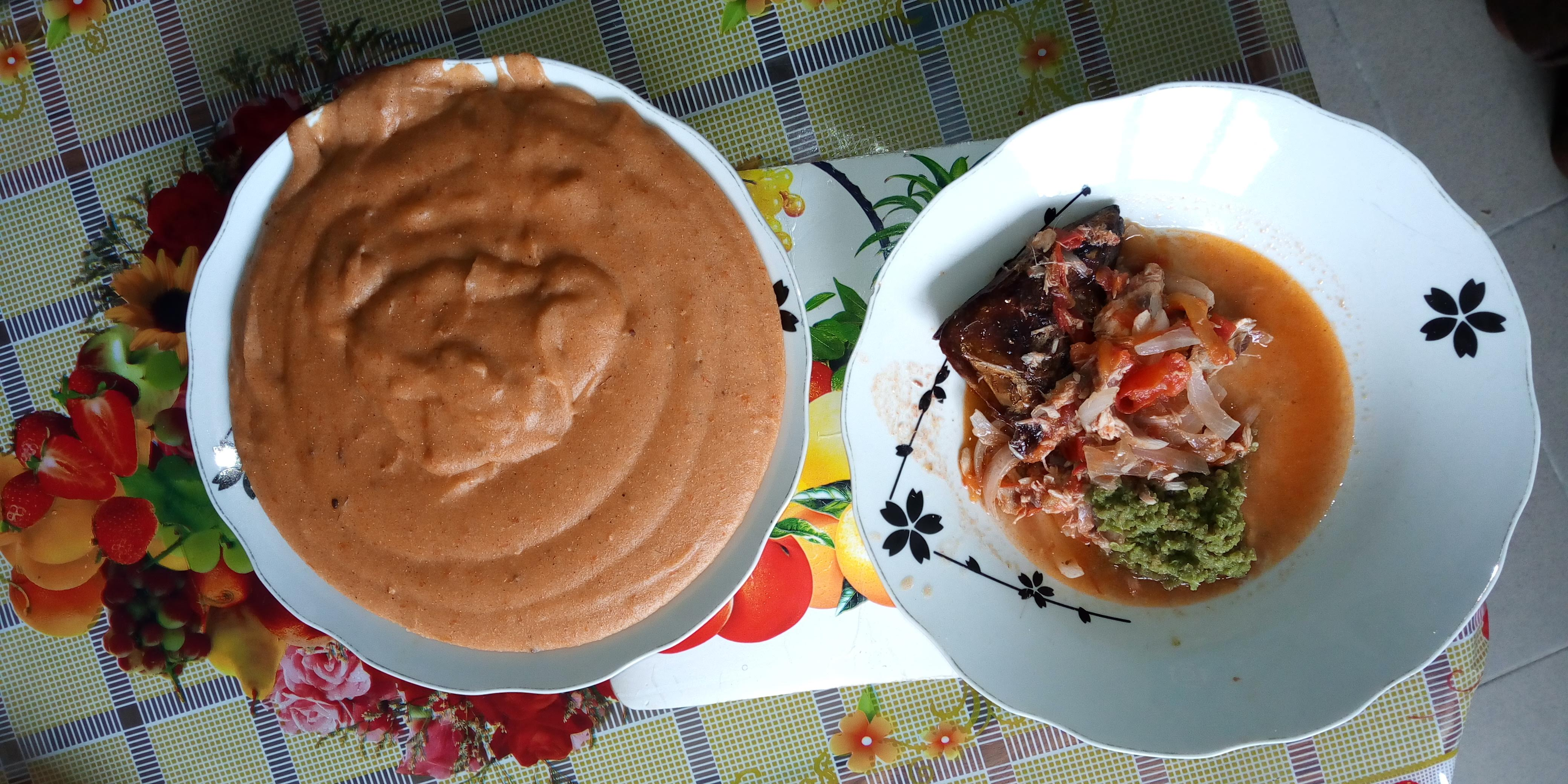
Amiwo

Amiwo is a traditional dish in Benin, consisting of a savory pudding made from spices (onions, garlic, black pepper, salt), cornflour and tomato paste, cooking oil or more traditionally palm oil. It is often served as a side with fried or grilled chicken or fish and a fresh tomato and onion relish. It literally translates to fat pudding.

== Preparation ==
Amiwo is made out of corn flour, and flavored with ingredients which may include chicken bouillon cubes, tomato paste, yellow onion, garlic, salt, pepper water, green hot chillis, shrimp, and palm oil. The ingredients are mixed well and cooked to create a pudding.
