= Ogawa =

Ogawa (written: 小川 lit. "small river" or おがわ in hiragana) is the 30th most common Japanese surname. Less common variants are 小河 (also "small river") or 尾川 ("tail river"). Notable people with the surname include:

- Ai Ogawa (愛 小川; 1947–2010), American poet
- Aya Ogawa, multiple people
- Daiki Ogawa (小川 大貴; born 1991), Japanese footballer
- Frank H. Ogawa (1917–1994), the first Japanese American to serve on the Oakland, CA City Council
- Hiroshi Ogawa (disambiguation), several people
- Hitoshi Ogawa (小河 等; 1956–1992), Japanese racing driver
- Gōtarō Ogawa (小川 郷太郎; 1876 – 1945), Japanese cabinet minister
- Ito Ogawa (小川 糸; born 1973), a Japanese novelist, lyricist and translator, born in 1973
- Jiro Ogawa (小川 次郎; born 1939), Japanese ice hockey player
- Ogawa Kazumasa (小川 一眞; 1860–1929), Japanese photographer
- Kenichi Ogawa (尾川 堅一; born 1988), Japanese boxer
- Kiyoko Ogawa (小川 清子; born 1946), Japanese sprinter
- Kiyoshi Ogawa (小川 清; 1922–1945), Japanese kamikaze pilot
- Koki Ogawa (disambiguation), multiple people
- Makoto Ogawa (pilot) (小川 誠; born 1917), retired Japanese army aviator
- Makoto Ogawa (小川 麻琴; born 1987), Japanese pop singer and actress best known as a former member of Morning Musume
- Marumi Ogawa (小川 まるみ; born 1981), Japanese television personality and gravure idol
- Masataka Ogawa (小川 正孝; 1865–1930), Japanese chemist
- Mikihiro Ogawa (小川 幹弘; born 1972), a.k.a. Shido Nakamura
- Naoya Ogawa (小川 直也; born 1968), Japanese judoka/wrestler/mixed martial artist
- Naoyuki Ogawa (小川 直之; born 1954), Japanese sailor
- Noriko Ogawa (pianist) (小川 典子; born 1962), Japanese classical pianist
- Noriko Ogawa (singer) (小川 範子; born 1973), Japanese actress
- Ryo Ogawa (小河 諒; born 1991), Japanese racing driver
- Ryoya Ogawa (小川 諒也; born 1996), Japanese footballer
- Seiji Ogawa (小川 誠二; born 1934), Japanese developer of Functional MRI, 2003 winner of the Japan Prize
- Shinsuke Ogawa (小川 紳介; 1935–1992), Japanese documentary film director
- Shoot Ogawa (born 1974), magician
- Ogawa Suketada (小川 祐忠; 1549–1601), Japanese daimyō
- Takehiro Ogawa (小川 健洋; born 1996), Japanese musician
- Tadaharu Ogawa (小川 忠晴; born 1969), Japanese basketball player and coach
- Tomohiro Ogawa (小川 智大; born 1996), Japanese volleyball player
- Toshio Ogawa (小川 敏夫; born 1948), Japanese politician
- Yōko Ogawa (小川 洋子; born 1962), Japanese author
- Yoshimi Ogawa (小川 善美; born 1966), Japanese businesswoman
- Yoshinari Ogawa (小川 良成; born 1966), Japanese wrestler
- Yoshizumi Ogawa (小川 佳純; born 1984), Japanese footballer
- Yusei Ogawa (小川 雄勢; born 1996), Japanese judoka

== Fictional characters ==
- Alyssa Ogawa (Star Trek)
- Ayumi Ogawa (緒川 歩実), (Good Luck!!)
- Eri Ogawa (小川 恵里) (Kamen Rider Ryuki)
- Hiroe Ogawa (小川 広恵) (F3: Frantic, Frustrated & Female)
- Ikue Ogawa (小川 育恵) (High School Girls)
- Michiru Ogawa (小川 みちる) (Bleach)
- Miharu Ogawa (小川 美晴) (Red String)
- Miyuki Ogawa (緒川美由紀), (Gender-Swap at the Delinquent Academy)
- Sakura Ogawa (小川 さくら) (Battle Royale)
- Sanshiro Ogawa (Natsume Soseki no Sanshiro)
- Yuuko Ogawa (小川 優子) (Kocchi Muite! Miiko)

== See also ==
- Japanese name
