= Cameroonian cuisine =

Culinary traditions of Cameroon

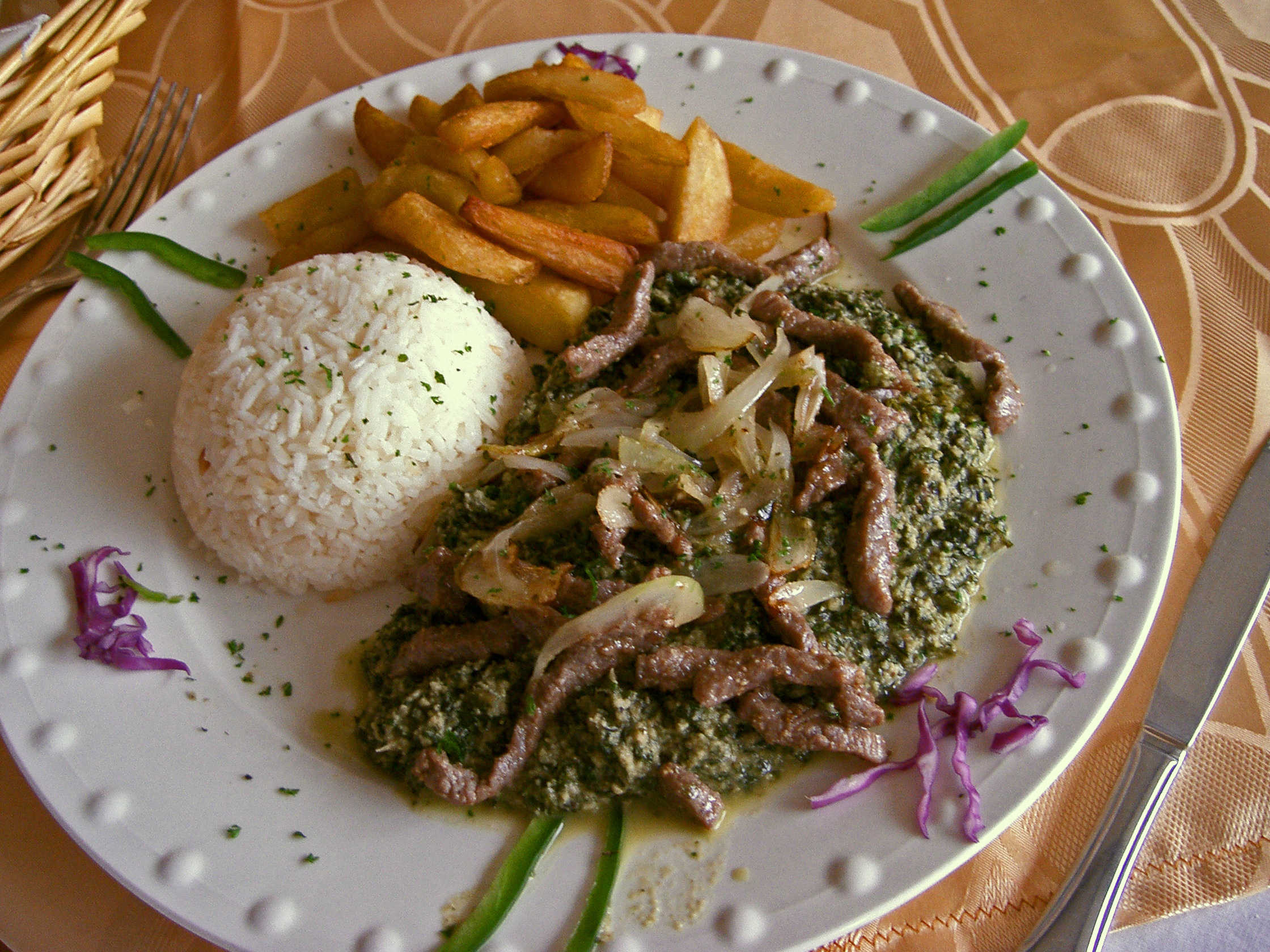
Ndolé

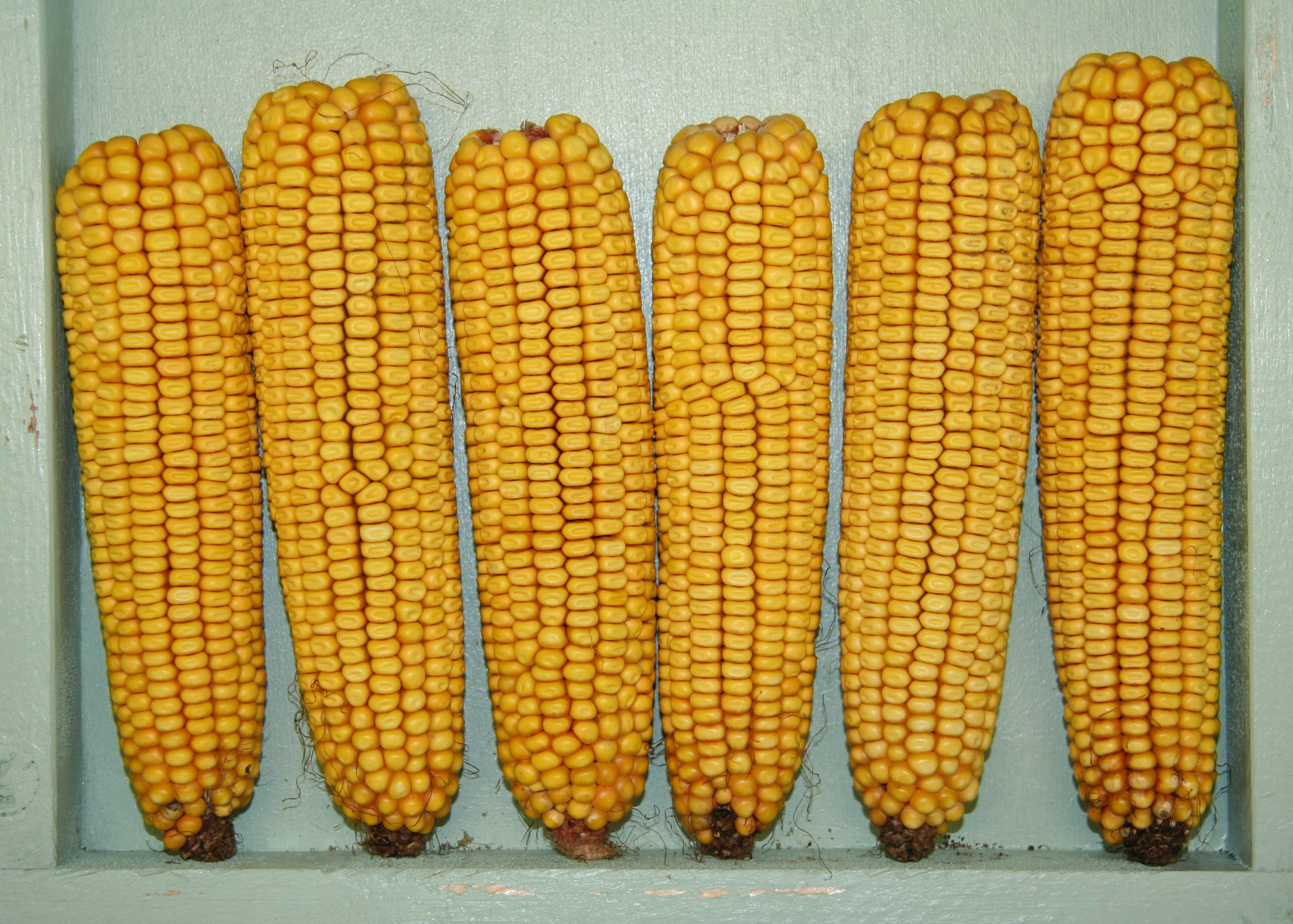
Maize, a staple food in Cameroon

Location of Cameroon

Cameroonian cuisine is one of the most varied in Africa due to Cameroon's location on the crossroads between the north, west, and center of the continent; the diversity in ethnicity with mixture ranging from Bantus, Bamileke people, Bamoun, Bamenda people and Shuwa Arabs, as well as the influence of German, French and British colonization.

== Ingredients ==
The soil of most of the country is very fertile and a wide variety of vegetables and fruits, both domestic and imported species, are grown. These include:

- Cassava
- Plantain
- Peanut
- Fufu
- Hot pepper/Penja white pepper
- Maize
- Eggplant
- Okra
- Bitterleaf
- Tomato
- Cocoyam
- Banana

== Specialties ==
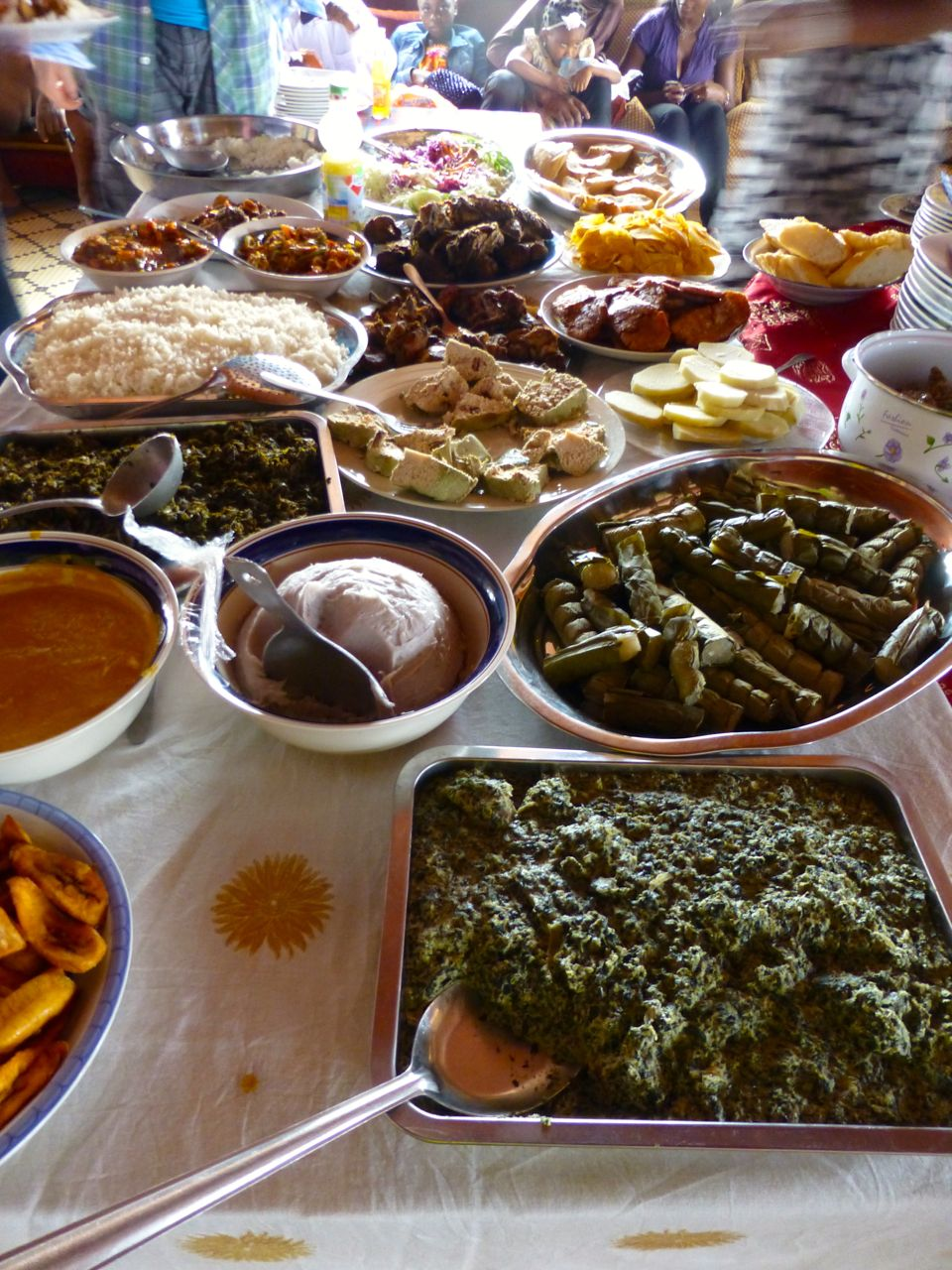
Traditional dishes served at Ebogo in the Centre Region

Among Cameroonian specialties are:

- Fufu corn and njama njama (garden huckleberry leaves)
- Brochettes, known locally as soya (a kind of barbecued kebab made from chicken, beef, or goat)
- Sangah (a mixture of maize, cassava leaf, and palm nut juice)
- Mbanga soup and kwacoco
  - This is a Cameroonian meal made up of kwacoco: cocoyams (taro) grated and steamed in banana leaves, and banga soup, made of fresh palm nuts. It is a native dish of the Bakweri people from the Southwest region.
- Eru or nfoh and water fufu
  - Eru is a vegetable soup made up of finely shredded leaves of the eru. The eru is cooked with waterleaf or spinach, palm oil, crayfish, and either smoked fish, cow skin (kanda) or beef. It is normally eaten with water fufu (cassava); it is a native dish of the Manyu people from the Southwest region.
- Ndolé (a spicy stew containing bitterleaf greens, meat, shrimp, pork rind, and peanut paste)

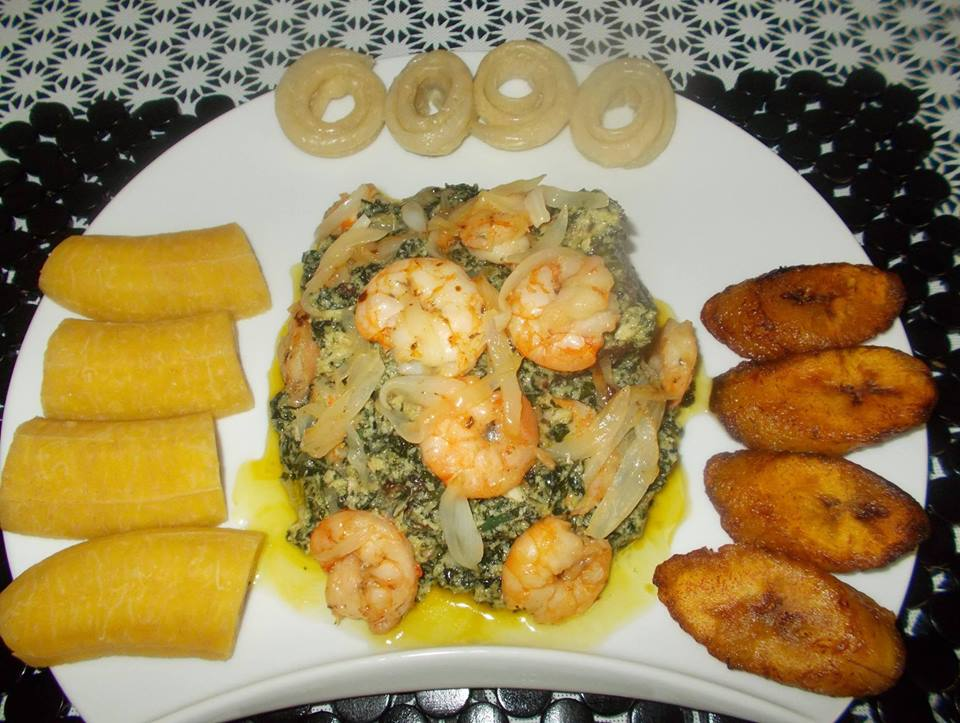
Ndolè with meat, morrue and shrimp

- Koki (primarily consisting of blackeyed peas and red palm oil)
- Achu soup
  - Achu soup or yellow soup is a staple food commonly eaten among the Tikar and Ngemba tribes of the Northwest and West regions of Cameroon. Although the main accompaniment is yellow soup, the dish is sometimes served with green soup as well. The name “achu” is used in the Northwest region, while in the West region it is called “taro.” The climate and soil in these areas greatly favor the different types of cocoyam used in preparing this delicious dish. Achu is highly traditional and is often served as the main dish during cultural events and celebrations.
  - The meal is made from cocoyam and unripe bananas, which are pounded into a smooth dough. Traditionally, the cocoyam and bananas are boiled, peeled, and then pounded in a mortar with a pestle to form the dough. The yellow soup is prepared with palm oil, “niki” (also known as potash or limestone), special condiments that enhance the flavor, salt, pepper, and water or stock from a variety of meats such as beef, cow skin, beef tripe. The "niki" changes the color of the palm oil to yellow, which is the reason why achu soup is also known as yellow soup. When served, it is typically paired with the meats or fish, which can be boiled, fried, or smoked and sometimes vegetables on the side.
- Mbongo'o tjobi (a spicy black soup made with native herbs and spices)

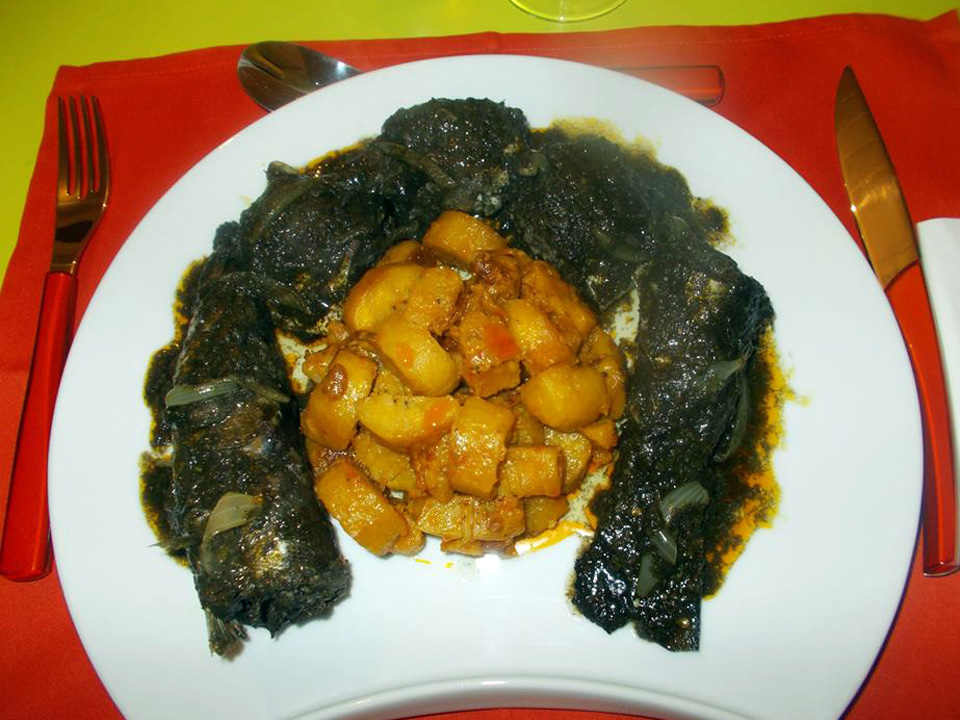
Mbongo'o tjobi and banana plantain

- Egusi soup (ground pumpkin seeds often cooked with dark leafy greens or okra)
- Kondreh (stewed unripe plantains with herbs and spices, usually cooked with goat meat)
- Kati kati, a grilled chicken dish and traditional food of the Kom.

Curries, soups and fish dishes are common, as well as meats on skewers. Insects are eaten in some parts of the country, particularly the forested regions.

== See also ==
- List of African cuisines
