= 聖 =

聖, meaning 'holy, saint', may refer to:

- Hijiri (disambiguation), various Japanese transliterations
- Koki, Japanese masculine given name for Koki Tanaka
- Mizuki, Japanese unisex given name for Mizuki Fukumura
- Satoshi, Japanese masculine given name
- Sei#People, Japanese unisex given name
- Takashi, Japanese masculine given name for Takashi Nishimoto

== See also ==
- Koki (disambiguation)
