= Soho Radio =

- London; England
- Frequency: 9A DAB (London)

Ownership
- Owner: Finlay Morton

History
- First air date: 7 May 2014 (online)

Links
- Website: www.sohoradiolondon.com

Soho Radio is an independent radio station that broadcasts online from London and from New York, as well as on DAB in London. Its studios are based in Soho, London, and in Rockefeller Center in New York City. It was founded May 2014, with the New York branch opening in November 2020.

== Location ==
Soho Radio broadcasts live from a street side studio in Soho, London. The original studio at 22C Great Windmill Street in Soho opened in 2014. The studio featured a shop space at the front, used to host pop up residencies, shops, brands, and events. In June 2019, they opened their second studio at 33 Broadwick Street in Soho. In December 2020, Soho Radio launched in New York, broadcasting live from Rockefeller Center.

== Presenters ==
Soho Radio has over 250 resident presenters covering all genres. Notable hosts and guests include:

Notable hosts and guests have included:

- 4AD
- Tony Allen
- Dennis Bovell
- Tim Burgess
- Edwyn Collins
- Domino
- Eats Everything
- Tom Findlay (Groove Armada)
- Ezra Furman
- Jools Holland
- Idles
- Norman Jay MBE
- James Lavelle
- Simone Marie (Primal Scream)
- Róisín Murphy
- Mute Records
- Anton Newcombe (The Brian Jonestown massacre)
- Ninja Tune
- Anna Prior (Metronomy)
- Mark Ronson
- Rough Trade
- Jim Sclavunos (Nick Cave & The Bad Seeds)
- Nadine Shah
- Seth Troxler
- Paul Weller
- Professor Heinz Wolff

== Soho Radio Vinyl Sessions ==
Soho Radio host Vinyl Sessions, with artists performing two tracks live as they cut the session direct to acetate. These one-off lathe cut acetates are then auctioned off for charity. The Soho Radio Vinyl Session with Paul Weller raised £2500 for the charity Shelter.

Session artists have included:

- Paul Weller
- KT Tunstall
- Idles
- Seun Kuti
- Sampa the Great
- Tim Burgess
- Reuben James
- MckNasty
- Kay Young
- Field Music
- Steve Mason
- Madison McFerrin
- Skinny Pelembe
- Hejira
- Remi
- Omar
- Joel Culpepper
- Terri Walker
- Jeffrey Lewis
- Ibibio Sound Machine
- Let's Eat Grandma

== Awards ==
- Awarded Best Online Radio Station in the Mixcloud Online Radio Awards 2016
- Awarded Event of the Decade in Time Out magazine in 2019
