= Koki =

Koki may refer to:

== Places ==
- Koki (village), a medieval aul in Ingushetia
- Koki, Comoros, a village on the island of Anjouan in the Comoros
- Koki, Senegal, a town in the Louga region of Senegal
- Koki, Estonia, village in Lümanda Parish, Saare County, Estonia
- Koki, a suburb of Port Moresby, Papua New Guinea

== Other uses ==
- Koki (kickboxer), Japanese kickboxer
- Koki (food), a Cameroonian cuisine dish made with black-eyed peas and red palm oil
- Japanese imperial year (皇紀 kōki)
- Kōki (given name), a Japanese given name
- KOKI-TV, a television station in Tulsa, Oklahoma, formerly affiliated with Fox
- Koki, a Spanish children's claymation series that appears as a segment on the American children's TV series Big Bag
- Koki, a variety of the Doromu language of Papua New Guinea
- Marker pen, called a koki in South Africa
- Koki, a weekly Indonesian cooking tabloid, published from 2003 to 2020
- Koki (cockatoo), a bird owned by Josip Broz Tito living at Brijuni national park
- Koki, a character in Wild Kratts
