= SEI =

Sei or SEI may refer to:

== Arts ==
- Sei (album), a 2012 album by Nando Reis, or the title song
- Sei, a 2025 album by Kaki King
- Sei (film), a 2018 Tamil thriller film

== Organizations and companies ==
- 7-Eleven, a popular multinational chain of gas stations and convenience stores
- Safety Equipment Institute, a private, non-profit organization established to test safety and protective products
- Scottish Episcopal Institute, the theological college of the Scottish Episcopal Church
- Script Encoding Initiative, a department at UC Berkeley supporting proposals for minor and historic scripts in the Unicode Standard.
- Scuba Educators International, a non-profit diver training organization
- SEI Investments Company, a financial services company headquartered in the United States
- Slough Estates International, the former name for Segro
- Smith Enterprise, a firearm and accessory manufacturing facility based in Tempe, Arizona that is known for making flash suppressors, muzzle brakes, sound suppressors, M14 rifles and accessories for M14 rifles.
- Software Engineering Institute, a federally funded research and development center at Carnegie Mellon University
- SpaceWorks Enterprises, a small aerospace engineering company in the United States
- Stockholm Environment Institute, a non-profit institute that specializes in sustainable development and environmental issues
- Sustainable Endowments Institute, a special project of Rockefeller Philanthropy Advisors, Inc, the Sustainable Endowments Institute (SEI) has pioneered research, education and outreach to advance resilient institutional responses to the climate crisis.
- Sumitomo Electric Industries, a manufacturer in automotive, information and communications, electronics, environment and energy, and industrial materials
- SUNY Eye Institute, a medical and basic sciences research institute in New York

== People ==
Given name

- Shō Sei (1497–1555), king of the Ryukyu Kingdom from 1526 to 1555
- Shō Sei (r. 1803), king of the Ryukyu Kingdom in 1803
- Sei Andō (born 1983), Japanese stage actress
- Sei Ashina (born 1983), Japanese actress
- Sei Fujii (1882–1954), Japanese male immigrant rights activist in the United States
- Sei Hatsuno (born 1976), Japanese male writer of mystery and thriller novels
- Sei Hiraizumi (born 1944), Japanese actor
- Sei Ikeno (1931–2004), Japanese composer
- Sei Itō (1905–1969), Japanese Modernist writer of poetry, prose and essays, and a translator
- Sei Kawahara (born 1995), Japanese male figure skater
- Sei Matobu (born 1976) Japanese actress
- Sei Muroya (born 1994) Japanese professional footballer
- Sei Shōnagon (966–1017 or 1025), Japanese author, poet, and court lady
- Sei Soga (1882–1970) Japanese activist and community leader in Hawaii
- Sei Yoshida (1909–1976) Japanese politician
- A member of girl group Weki Meki

Surname

- Indrek Sei (born 1972), Estonian freestyle swimmer
- Sadao Sei Japanese astronomer who discovered an asteroid in 1983

== Other uses ==
- Sei whale, a baleen whale
- Se'i, traditional bacon from Timor, Indonesia
- Subjective Effect Index, a website documenting and classifying the effects of psychedelic drugs
- Seebeck effect imaging, uses a laser to generate thermal gradients in conductors in order to locate electrically floating conductors
- Secondary electron image, a type of imaging in scanning electron microscopes to view sample topography
- Seri language, spoken in two Mexican villages
- Service endpoint interface, a term used in Java Platform, Enterprise Edition when exposing Enterprise JavaBean as web service
- Social-Emotional Intelligence (see Emotional Intelligence)
- Space Exploration Initiative, a plan envisioned by former U.S. President George H.W. Bush with crewed Moon and Mars missions
- Spanish East Indies, a former Spanish colony comprising the Philippines and most of Micronesia
- Solid electrolyte interface
- 清 (disambiguation)
- 聖 (disambiguation)
