= Hijiri =

Hijiri may refer to:

== Locations ==
- Mount Hijiri (聖岳, Hijiri-dake), Akaishi Mountains, Honshu, Japan
- Hijiri Highlands, Omi, Nagano, Hokkaido, Japan
- Hijiri-Kōgen Station, is a train station
- Hijiri Museum (聖博物館, Hijiri hakubutsukan), an aviation museum in Omi, Nagano, Hokkaido, Japan
- Hijiri zaka, a hill road in Minato, Tokyo, Japan

Fictional locations

- Hijiri Gakuen (Japanese: Hijiri School), the fictional setting of Tenshi Nanka Ja Nai

== People ==
Surname

- Chiaki Hijiri, a Japanese mangaka and author of Seigi no Mikata
- John Hijiri, a Japanese film director; see the 2009 film Jaws in Japan
- Yuki Hijiri, a Japanese mangaka and author of Locke the Superman

Given name

- Hijiri Kato (加藤 聖, Kato Hijiri; born 2001), Japanese soccer player
- Hijiri Kuwano (桑野 聖, Kuwano Hijiri; born 1964), Japanese musician
- Hijiri Onaga (翁長 聖, Onaga Hijiri; born 1995), Japanese soccer player

=== Fictional characters ===
Surname

- Hijiri (聖, Hijiri), a character from Aa! Megami-sama! (Oh My Goddess!)
- Hijiri (聖), a character from Basara (manga)
- Akito Hijiri (ヒジリ アキト, Hijiri Akito), a character from Ultraman Trigger: New Generation Tiga
- Byakuren Hijiri (聖 白蓮, Hijiri Byakuren), a character in Undefined Fantastic Object from Touhou Project
- Hideyoshi Hijiri (聖 秀吉, Hijiri Hideyoshi), a character from Bari Bari Densetsu
- Jyoji Hijiri, a character from Shin Megami Tensei III: Nocturne
- Kanna Hijiri (聖 カンナ, Hijiri Kanna), a character from Puella Magi Madoka Magica
- Masumi Hijiri (聖 真澄, Hijiri Masumi), a character from Swan (manga)

Given name

- Hijiri Himuro (氷室 聖, Himuro Hijiri), a character from Pretty Rhythm: Rainbow Live
- Hijiri Honjou (本条 聖, Honjō Hijiri), a character from Twinkle Stars
- Hijiri Kanata (彼方 ヒジリ, Kanata Hijiri), a character from Girls Bravo
- Hijiri Kasuga (春日 聖, Kasuga Hijiri), a character from Trinity Seven
- Hijiri Midou (御堂 聖, Midō Hijiri), a character from Ratman (manga)
- Hijiri Minowa (三ノ輪 聖, Minowa Hijiri), a character from Bakuon!!
- Hijiri Mochizuki (望月聖, Mochizuki Hijiri), a character from The Idolmaster Cinderella Girls: Starlight Stage
- Hijiri Mutsuki (無月 ヒジリ, Mutsuki Hijiri), a character from Scared Rider Xechs
- Hijiri Nojima (野島 聖, Nojima Hijiri), a character from Kageki Shojo!!
- Hijiri Takao (高雄聖, Takao Hijiri), a character from Failure Frame
- Hijiri Yajima (矢島 聖（ヒジリー, Yajima Hijiri), a character from FLCL

== Other uses ==
- Hijiri (Buddhist) (hijiri (聖)), an itinerant Japanese Buddhist ascetic

== See also ==
- Hijra (disambiguation)
- 聖 (disambiguation)
