= Scorodophloeus zenkeri =

Scientific classification
- Kingdom: Plantae
- Clade: Tracheophytes
- Clade: Angiosperms
- Clade: Eudicots
- Clade: Rosids
- Order: Fabales
- Family: Fabaceae
- Genus: Scorodophloeus
- Species: S. zenkeri

Binomial name
- Scorodophloeus zenkeri Harms

Species of legume native to Central Africa

Scorodophloeus zenkeri, also known as garlic tree, is a species of flowering plant in the family Fabaceae native to western Central Africa.

Its bark, seeds, and fruit have an aroma reminiscent of garlic or other alliums. The bark and seeds are used as a spice after drying and powdering, in dishes such as bongo'o.

Alternative names:

- hiomi or ngô (Bassa)
- olom (Ewondo)
- olan (Boulou)
- lem (Bafoussam)
- lom (Bamiléké)
- doum (Bangangté)
- bobinbi (Douala)
- mingagne (Baka)

== Conservation ==
This tree is protected when clearing land for agriculture, and is sometimes introduced purposefully into these farms, including coffee and cocoa plantations. The bark is often harvested in a destructive and uncontrolled manner, which can result in the tree's death.

== See also ==
- Scorodophloeus zenkeri on plantuse.plantuse.plantnet.org (an online copy of)
