= Tsukuyomi: Moon Phase CD collections =

Three CD collection albums have been released for Tsukuyomi: Moon Phase in Japan. The first two releases contain the opening and ending themes, along with instrumental (or karaoke) versions of the songs. The third release was a soundtrack (though it was titled a "Best Collection"), which contains theme and incidental music from the series. This album was released in both regular and limited editions.

== Opening theme single ==
Anime Tsukuyomi–Moon Phase– Opening Theme "Neko Mimi Mode"
(アニメ「月詠(つくよみ) -MOON PHASE-」オープニングテーマ: Neko Mimi Mode)
VICL-35712, October 21, 2004, ¥1155

1. "Neko Mimi Mode"
2. "Tsuku Yomi Mode"
3. "Neko Mimi Mode" (without Hazuki)
4. "Tsuku Yomi Mode" (without Luna)

== Ending theme single ==
TV Tokyo Animation Tsukuyomi Ending Theme "Kanashii Yokan" / "Nami no Toriko ni Naru yō ni"
(TV東京アニメーション「月詠」EDテーマ「悲しい予感」 / 挿入歌「波のトリコになるように」)
VICL-35730, November 21, 2004, ¥1155

1. "Kanashii Yokan" (Marianne Amplifier featuring Yuka)
2. "Nami no Toriko ni Naru yō ni" (Noriko Ogawa)
3. "Kanashii Yokan" (instrumental)
4. "Nami no Toriko ni Naru yō ni" (instrumental)

== Best Collection ==
TV Tokyo Animation Tsukuyomi–Moon Phase– Best Collection "Zenbu, Kikitakunacchatta…"
(テレビ東京アニメーション「月詠-MOON PHASE-」BEST COLLECTION 「全部、聴きたくなっちゃった・・・」)
VICL-61558 (Limited Edition: VIZL-130), January 21, 2005, ¥3054
All tracks composed and arranged by Daisuke Kume except 2, 6 and 21. The limited edition release also came with a special 8 cm CD (see below), a special "cel" insert cover, and a set of "dress up" stickers for Hazuki.

1. The Theme of Moon Phase (Maki Kimura)
2. Neko Mimi Mode—TV size— (Dimitri From Paris)
3. Kiss Me
4. A Little Night Dream (Maki Kimura)
5. Memories of Your Blood (Maki Kimura)
6. Just for My Love (Fujo Twins (Mai Kadowaki & Miyu Matsuki))
7. Lemonade & Rice
8. A Valley in My Tears
9. Waltz (Maki Kimura)
10. Quiet Town
11. Be My Cat! (Maki Kimura)
12. At the Dark Garden (Maki Kimura)
13. Prelude (Maki Kimura)
14. Love! Love! Lips!
15. In the Flowers
16. Midnight Games (Maki Kimura)
17. Behind Voice (Maki Kimura)
18. Breathing (Maki Kimura)
19. Anata no Toki (Maki Kimura)
20. Dance with Me
21. Pressentiment triste (ending theme, French version) (Marianne Amplifier featuring Yuka)

=== Special insert disc ===
Hazuki's Unused Neko Mimi Voice All-Inclusive 8cm CD
(葉月の未使用ネコミミボイス全部入り8cmCD, Hazuki no Mishiyō Neko Mimi Boisu Zenbu Iri 8cm CD)

1. Neko Mimi Mode—TV size—(without Hazuki)
2. Neko Mimi 1
3. Neko Mimi 2
4. Neko Mimi Mode 1
5. Neko Mimi Mode 2
6. Neko Mimi Mode Desu 1
7. Neko Mimi Mode Desu 2
8. Unyā 1
9. Unyā 2
10. Unyanyā 1
11. Unyanyā 2
12. Full Full Full Moon 1
13. Full Full Full Moon 2
14. Onii-sama 1
15. Onii-sama 2
16. Ya•ku•so•ku•yo 1
17. Ya•ku•so•ku•yo 2
18. Atashi no Shimobē 1
19. Atashi no Shimobē 2
20. Kiss, Shitakunacchatta.... 1
21. Kiss, Shitakunacchatta.... 2
22. Kiss, Shitakunacchatta.... 3
