= Sangah =

Cameroonian dish

Sangah is a food made with maize, cassava leaf, and palm nut juice in Cameroonian cuisine. The leaves are mashed and the cooked mixture becomes a thick stew. It is often accompanied by rice or boiled plantain. It is a traditional food.
