= Penja =

Coordinates: 4°38′N 9°41′E

Penja Mpanja
- Commune and town
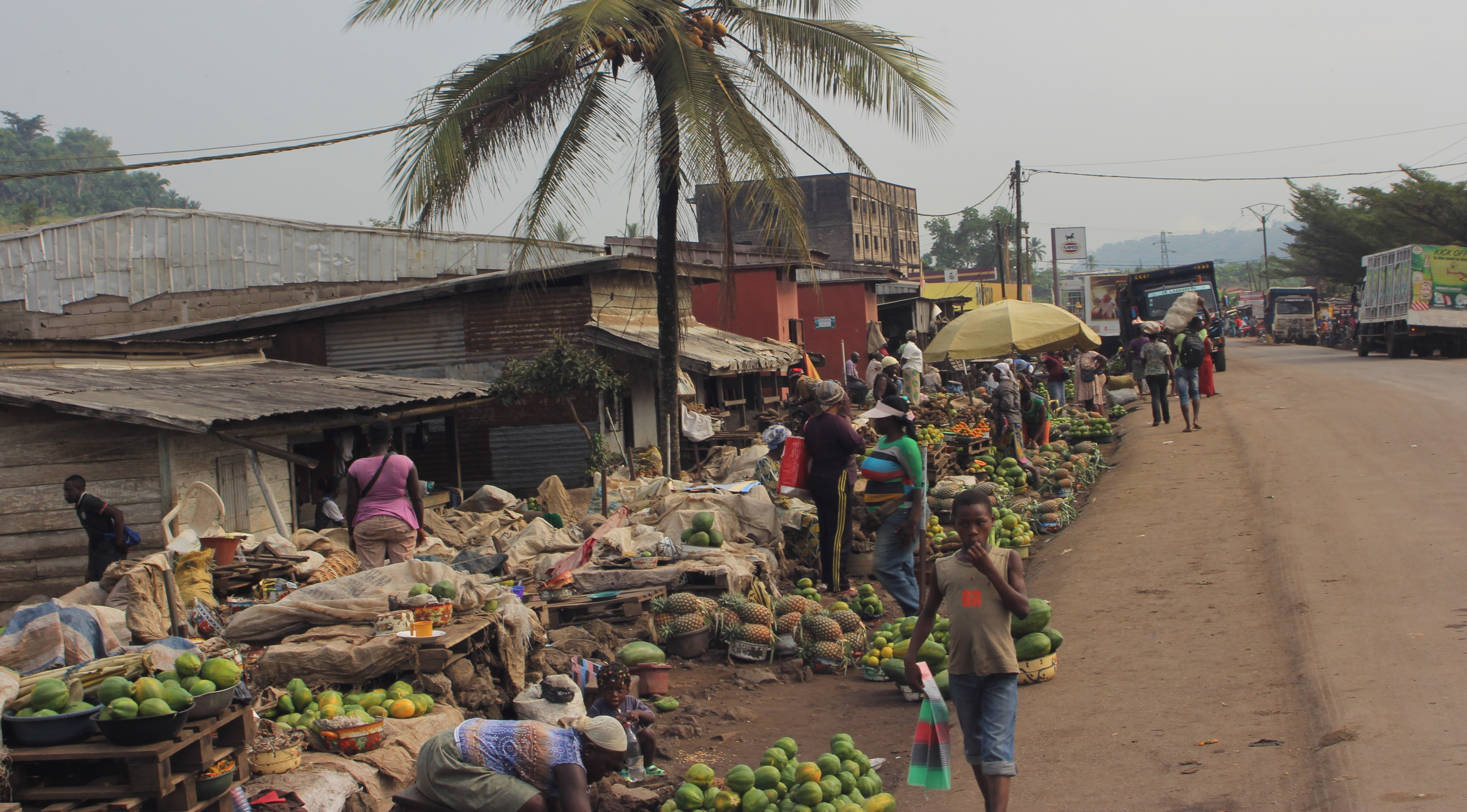
- Interactive map of Penja
- Country: Cameroon
- Region: Littoral
- Department: Koupe-Manengouba
- District: Middle Moungo
- Time zone: UTC+1 (WAT)

Penja is a town and sub-district in the South-West Region of Cameroon. It is known for its production of Penja white pepper.

== See also ==
- Communes of Cameroon
