= Kōki (given name) =

- Gender: Male

Origin
- Origin: Japanese
- Meaning: Different meanings depending on the kanji used

Kōki, Koki, Kouki or Kohki is a masculine Japanese given name. Notable people with the name include:

- Kōki (model) (born 2003), Japanese model
- Kohki Abe (阿部 浩己; born 1958), Japanese human rights activist
- Koki Ando, president of Nissin Food Products Co. Ltd
- Kōki Aoyagi (青柳 昴樹; born 1997), Japanese baseball player
- Koki Fukui (福井 光輝; born 1995), Japanese footballer
- Kōki Harasawa (born 1971), Japanese voice actor
- Kōki Hirota (廣󠄁田 弘毅, 1878–1948), Japanese prime minister
- Koki Ikeda (池田 向希; born 1998), Japanese racewalker
- Koki Ishii (born 1995), Japanese footballer
- Kōki Ishii (1940–2002), Japanese politician
- Kōki Kameda (born 1986), Japanese professional flyweight boxer
- Koki Kotegawa (born 1989), Japanese footballer
- Kōki Mitani (born 1961)
- Kōki Miyata (born 1972), Japanese voice actor
- Koki Mizuno (born 1985), Japanese footballer
- Koki Morita (森田 晃樹; born 2000), Japanese footballer
- Koki Nakamura (中村 宏輝; born 1992), Japanese footballer
- Kōki Naya (1940–2013), birth name of Taihō Kōki, Japanese sumo wrestler
- Koki Ogawa (disambiguation), multiple people
- Kōki Saitō (footballer) (斉藤 光毅; born 2001), Japanese footballer
- Koki Sakamoto (born 1986), Japanese Gymnast in the 2008 Olympics
- Koki Tanaka (born 1985), member to of the Japanese group KAT-TUN
- Kōki Tanaka (artist) (born 1975), Japanese artist
- Kouki Takahashi (1987–2011), Japanese motorcycle racer
- Koki Tsukagawa (塚川 孝輝; born 1994), Japanese footballer
- Koki Wakasugi (若杉 好輝; born 1995), Japanese footballer
- Koki Yamamoto (山本 幸輝; born 1990), Japanese rugby union player
- Koki Yonekura (米倉 恒貴; born 1988), Japanese footballer
- Koki Uchiyama (内山 昂輝, born 1990), Japanese voice actor
