= Kwacoco =

Cameroonian dish

Kwacoco, sometimes spelled kwa-coco, is a Cameroonian cuisine dish consisting of pureed cocoyam wrapped and steamed in banana leaves. It is consumed by different ethnic groups from Cameroon, specially the Kwe people, for whom the traditional meal usually consists of kwacoco served with banga and smoked fish. It is sometimes referred to as kwacoco bible when the cocoyam is mixed with other ingredients such as spinach, smoked fish, red oil and spices, and it can also be served along with many other stews and soups.

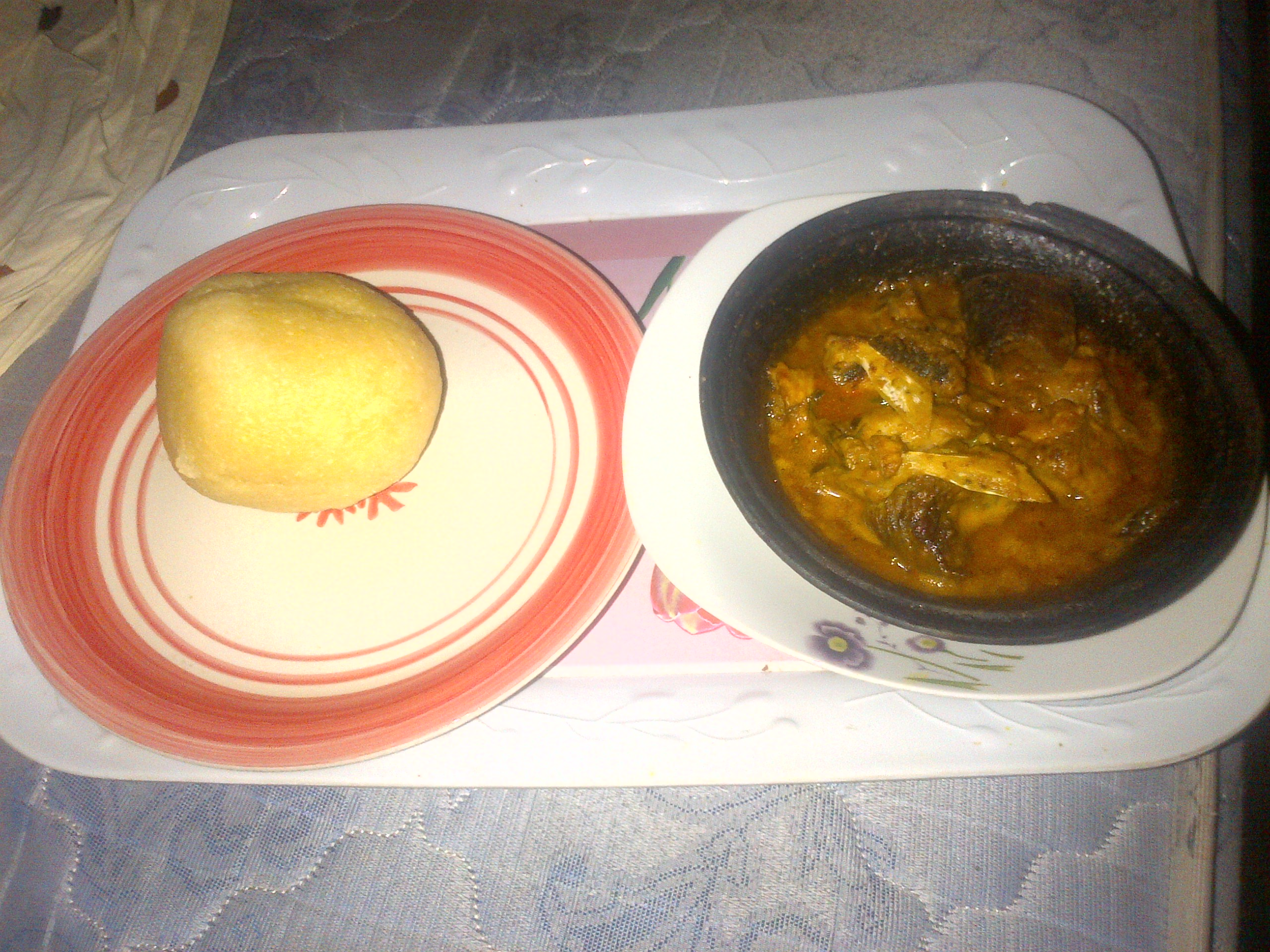
Eba (garri from cassava) served with fresh fish banga (palm kernel) soup in a clay pot

The combination of kwacoco and banga is a staple food for rural communities in Cameroon, who rely on the fats and carbohydrates provided by these foods to subsist. During the world food crisis of 2008, local farmers were encouraged to produce more cocoyam, and urban consumers were told to promote its consumption over imported food.

== See also ==
- List of steamed foods
