= Hijra =

Hijra, Hijrah, Hegira, Hejira, Hijrat or Hijri may refer to:

== Islam ==
- Hijrah (also Hejira or Hegira), the migration of Muhammad from Mecca to Medina in 622 CE
- Migration to Abyssinia or First Hegira, of Muhammad's followers in 615 CE
- Lunar Hijri calendar (widely known as "the Islamic calendar", although there is more than one Islamic calendar), the lunar calendar used by the majority of Muslims
  - Hijri year (Anno Hegirae, AH), the number of a year in the Hijri calendar
- Solar Hijri calendar, a solar Islamic calendar used primarily in Iran

== Literature ==
- Hijra, narrative poetry by the Malayalam poet Moyinkutty Vaidyar
- Hegira (novel), by Greg Bear, 1979
- Hegira, a fictional exodus from Earth in the Hyperion Cantos novels

== Music ==
- Hejira (album), by Joni Mitchell, 1976
- Hejira (band), a British Joni Mitchell cover band
- Hijrah, a 2016 album by George Hirsch

== Film and Television ==
- Hijra, a 2026 film directed by Shahad Ameen
- Hijrat, a 2016 Pakistani film
- TV Alhijrah, an Islamic Malaysian state television channel

== Other uses ==
- HIJRA (Humanitarian Initiative Just Relief Aid), an African organization
- Hijra (South Asia), a term for eunuchs, transgender and intersex people
- Hijrat, a South Asian term for protest emigration

== See also ==
- Hijara, a board game
- Hiigara, in the computer game Homeworld
