= Skinny Pelembe =

- Born: 26 August 1990 (age 36); Johannesburg, South Africa
- Origin: Doncaster, England
- Genres: Avant-pop; alternative rock; electronic rock; neo soul; psychedelia; alternative R&B; Afrobeat; post-punk
- Instruments: Vocals; guitar
- Years active: 2016–present
- Labels: Brownswood Recordings; Partisan Records
- Website: skinnypelembe.com

Doya Beardmore (born 26 August 1990), known professionally as Skinny Pelembe, is an English singer-songwriter and guitarist. He has released two albums Dreaming is Dead Now (2019) and Hardly the Same Snake (2023).

== Early life ==
Beardmore was born in Johannesburg, South Africa to an English father from Birmingham and a Mozambican mother. Concerned about Apartheid, under which interracial relationships were illegal and stigmatised, the family relocated to Doncaster, South Yorkshire when Beardmore was three.

== Career ==
As a teenager, Beardmore played in garage bands. He taught himself guitar and production.

Beardmore self-released his debut single "Mindset is Fear" in 2016 followed by his debut EP Seven Year Curse in 2017. After joining Gilles Peterson's Future Bubblers programme, Beardmore's second EP Sleep More, Make More Friends was released in 2018 via Peterson's label Brownswood Recordings, featuring collaborations with Yazmin Lacey, Hejira, Bernardo, and Emma-Jean Thackray, as well as the single collection "Spit/Swallow" and "Toy Shooter". Beardmore featured on the BBC Music Introducing stage at Reading and Leeds. He also played at the Great Escape Festival, Latitude Festival, and the BBC Radio 6 Music Festival and had gigs supporting Nightmares on Wax and Unkle, and at Rough Trade with Dry Cleaning and Dana Gavanski.

Produced with Malcolm Catto and via Brownswood Recordings, Beardmore released his debut album Dreaming is Dead Now in May 2019 and the single "I'll Be On Your Mind". He played at the Green Man Festival and Sŵn in Wales and had headline dates supported by Elsa Hewitt. He recorded a cover of Andrew Hill's "Illusion (Apparition)" for the Blue Note Records tribute jazz album Blue Note Re:imagined in 2020. He was commissioned to write a song for South Yorkshire in 2021.

Beardmore moved to Partisan Records in 2022. In 2023, Beardmore released his sophomore album Hardly the Same Snake and third EP Deadman Deadman Deadman, the singles "Oh, Silly George" and "Don't Be Another", and a rendition of Leonard Cohen's "Who by Fire" with Beth Orton. Beardmore made his Glastonbury Festival debut that summer. He also performed at Bluedot Festival, Deer Shed Festival and London Calling, returned to Reeperbahn and Sŵn, and embarked on tour. The music video for "Don't Be Another", directed by Jai Moseley, was nominated for Best Alternative Video – UK at the 2024 UK Music Video Awards.

== Artistry ==
Beardmore's sound has been described as an eclectic "collage" of different genres and "genre agnostic", and that "singling out any one influence… is an impossible task". During Beardmore's childhood, his father would play folk and country acts, his brothers introduced him to hip-hop, while his maternal family influenced him towards Afro-soul. Beardmore first drew upon drum and bass, developed as an artist on the UK garage scene and studied the Beatles and the Beach Boys.

In 2017 and 2019, Beardmore named Fela Kuti, Neil Young, CAN, Madlib, My Bloody Valentine and IG Culture as influences, as well as The Lijadu Sisters and Andrew Hill.

Other artists Beardmore has praised include The Only Ones, René Aubry, Frank Zappa, The Jam, The Style Council, Blossom Dearie, and The Animals.

== Discography ==
=== Albums ===
- Dreaming is Dead Now (2019)
- Hardly the Same Snake (2023)

=== EPs ===
- Seven Year Curse (2017)
- Sleep More, Make More Friends (2018)
- Deadman Deadman Deadman (2023)

=== Single ===
- "Mindset is Fear" (2016)
- "Spit/Swallow" / "Toy Shooter" (2018)
- "I'll Be On Your Mind" (2019)
- "Illusion (Silly Apparition)" (2020) (Andrew Hill cover)
- "Like a Heart Won't Beat" (2022)
- "Oh, Silly George" (2023)
- "Don't Be Another" (2023)
- "Who by Fire" (2023) with Beth Orton
