= Bongo'o =

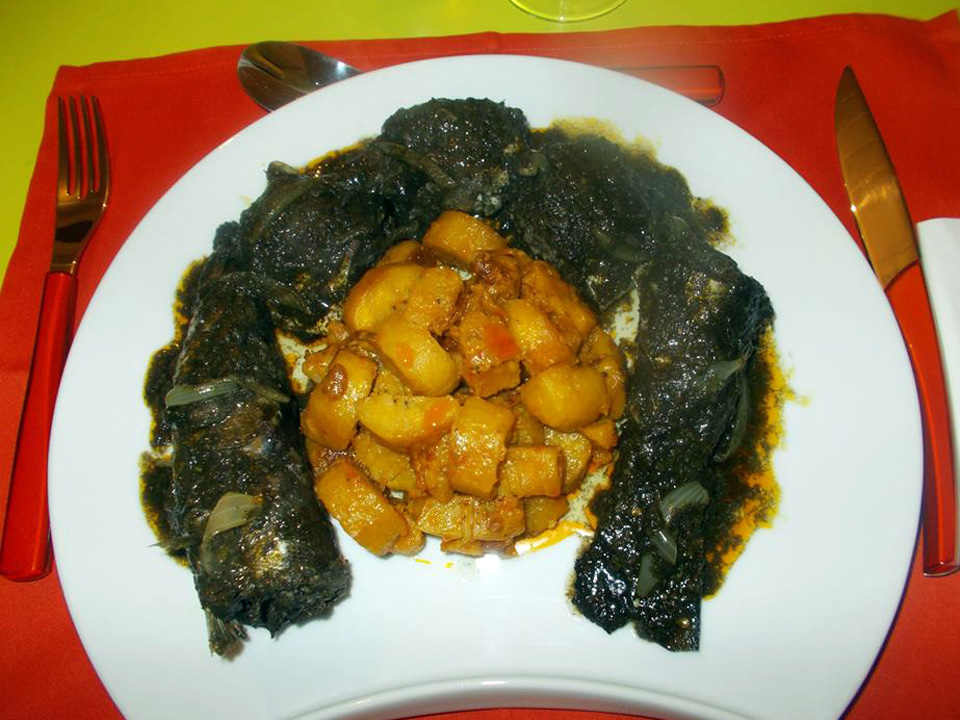
Mbongo tchobi with plantain

Bongo'o (or Mbongo), also known as ebony sauce or black stew, is a dark colored stew of the Bassa people in Cameroon.

Its dark color is owed to a blend of spices that can include garlic tree powder, four corner spice, calabash nutmeg, country onions, njangsa seeds, and more.

It can be prepared with various proteins, e.g. Bongo'o Tjobi (or Mbongo Tchobi) reflects a version made with fish (Tjobi in Bassa).

Bongô is traditionally served with steamed macabo or cassava. It is also eaten with plantain cooked in all its forms.

== See also ==
- Cameroonian cuisine
