= Ndolé =

National dish of Cameroon

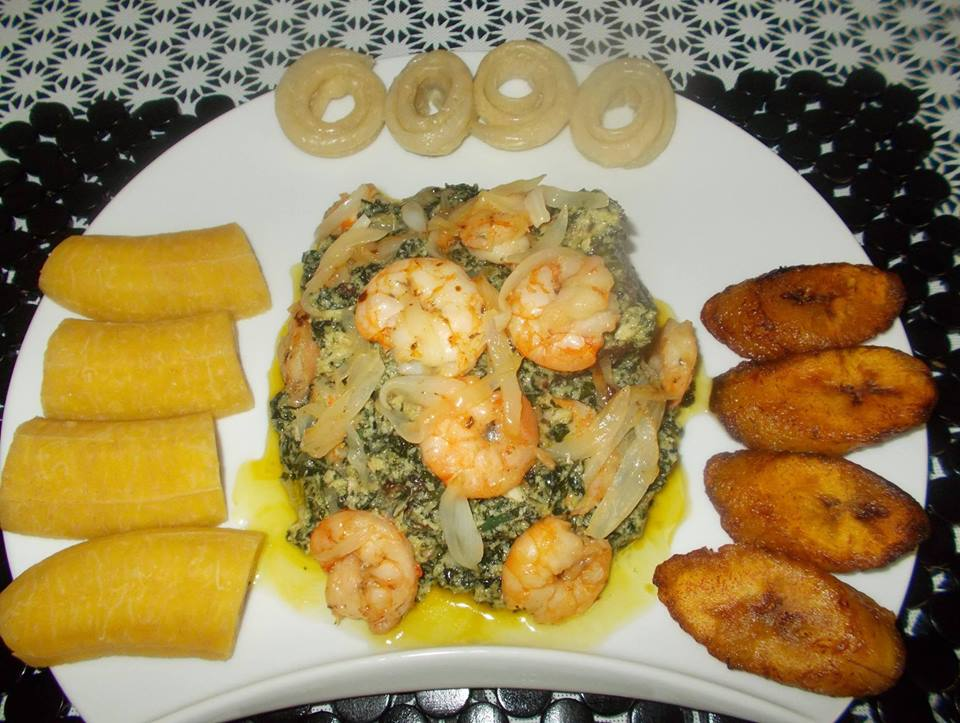
- Ndolè containing meat, cod and shrimp and accompanied by miondo and plantains
- Type: Stew
- Place of origin: Cameroon
- Serving temperature: Hot
- Main ingredients: Peanuts, ndoleh, crayfish, onions, fish or ground beef

Ndolé, also written Ndole or Ndolè, is a Cameroonian dish consisting of stewed ground peanuts, crayfish, garlic, onions, and ndoleh leaves (indigenous to West and Central Africa). The dish originated in Douala, in the Littoral Region of Cameroon. Ndolé is widely regarded as the national dish of Cameroon.

Ndolé is typically cooked with fish or beef, and in some variations, may contain shrimp, in which case the dish is described as "regal". The dish is traditionally accompanied by fried or boiled plantains, as well as bobolo or miondo, which are Cameroonian delicacies made of fermented ground manioc steamed in Marantaceae leaves and commonly formed into spiral shapes before serving.

== Preparation ==
Ndolé is sometimes compared to spinach because of its green color and leafy texture, despite having different cooking methods. The dish is considered labor-intensive and time-consuming to prepare, although its ingredients are generally affordable.

The preparation of the dish involves boiling the ndoleh leaves two to three times in salted water with rock salt to reduce their natural bitterness. The leaves are then incorporated into a cooked sauce made from freshly ground peanut paste and crushed spices. Cooked meat cut into pieces, smoked fish (such as cod), or fresh or smoked shrimp may be added to the mixture. Among some Cameroonian immigrant communities abroad, it may be accompanied by Asian rice; however, rice is not traditionally considered the standard accompaniment, as it has not historically been a staple food in Cameroon.

== Gallery ==
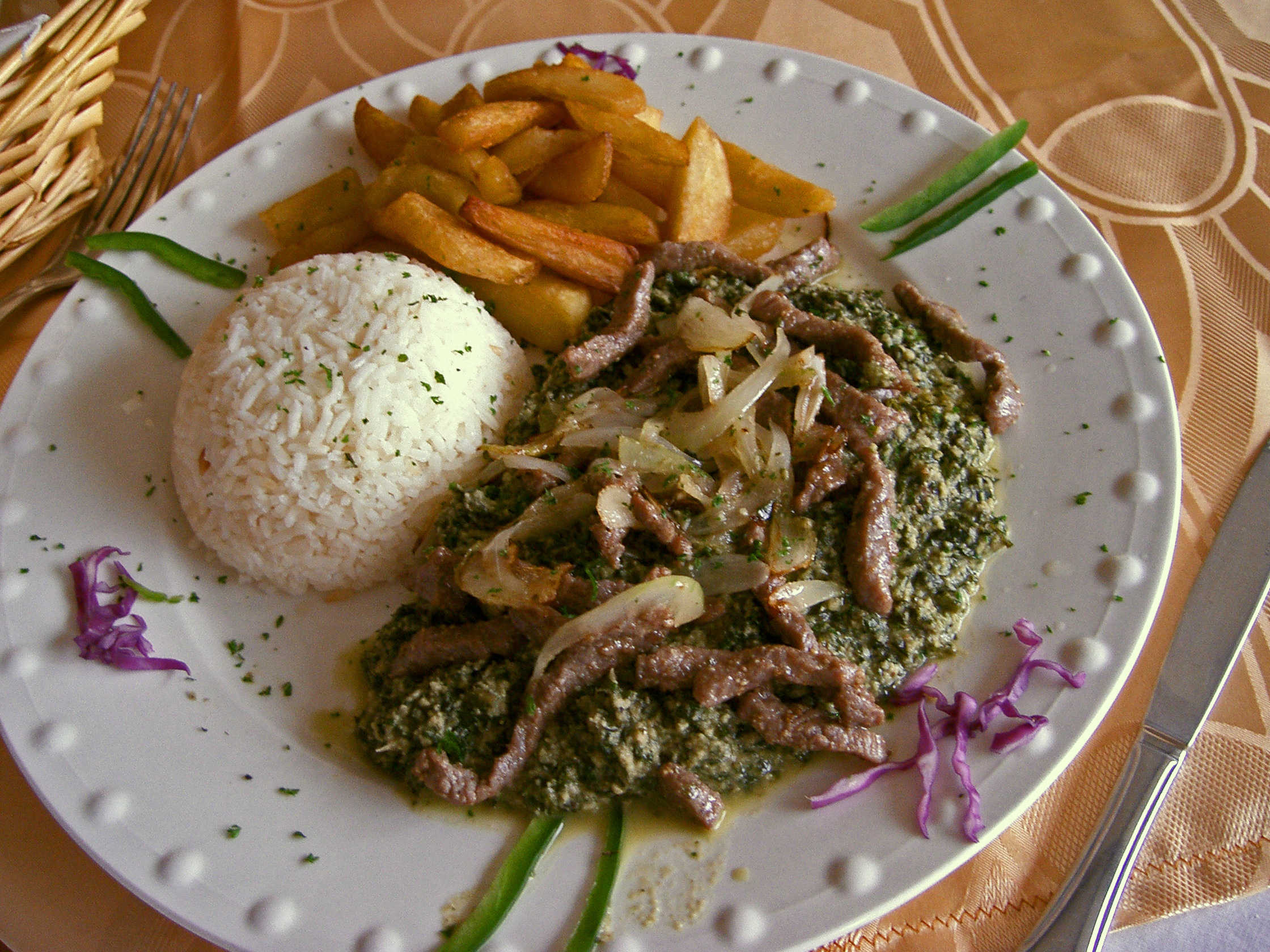
Ndolé with various accompaniments

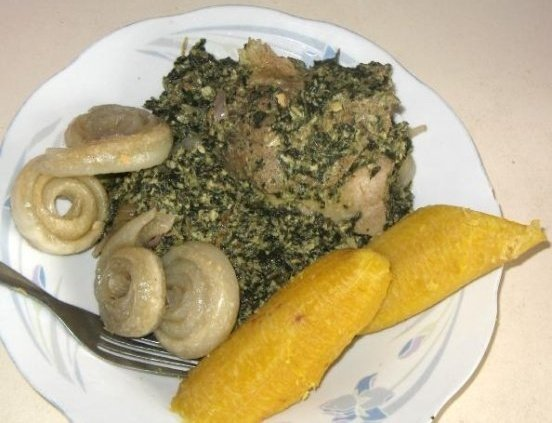
Ndolè with miondo and boiled plantains

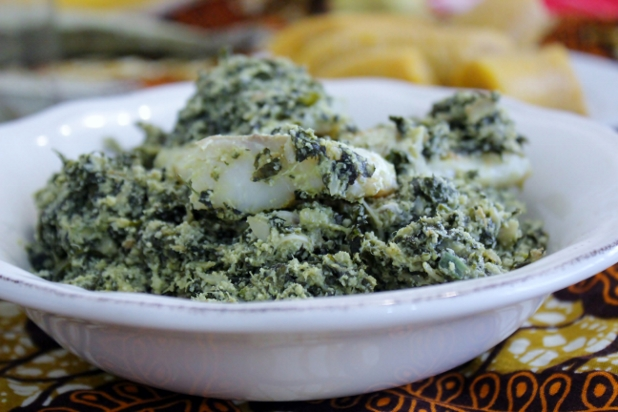
Ndolè with cod

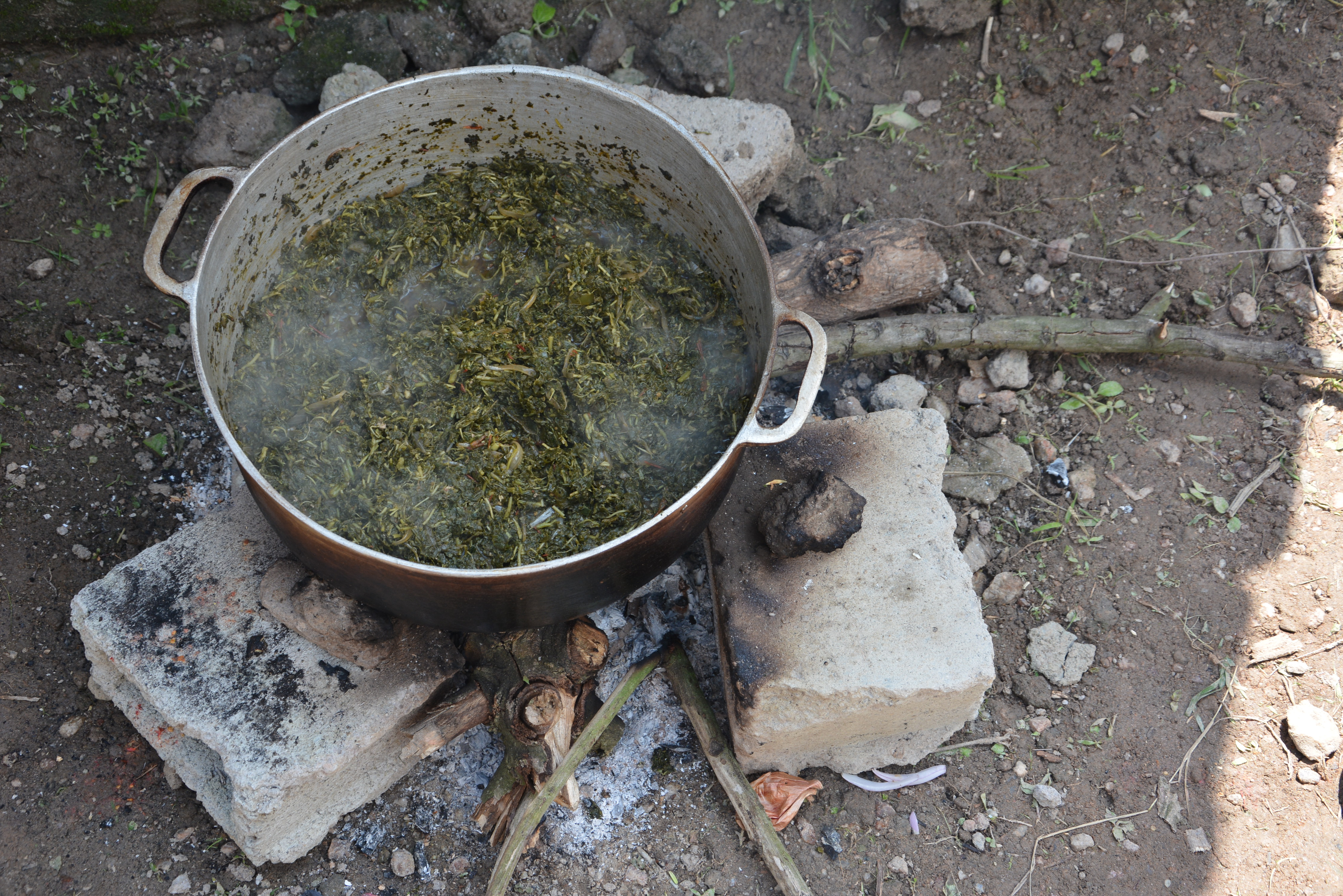
Ndolé prepared in a cooking pot

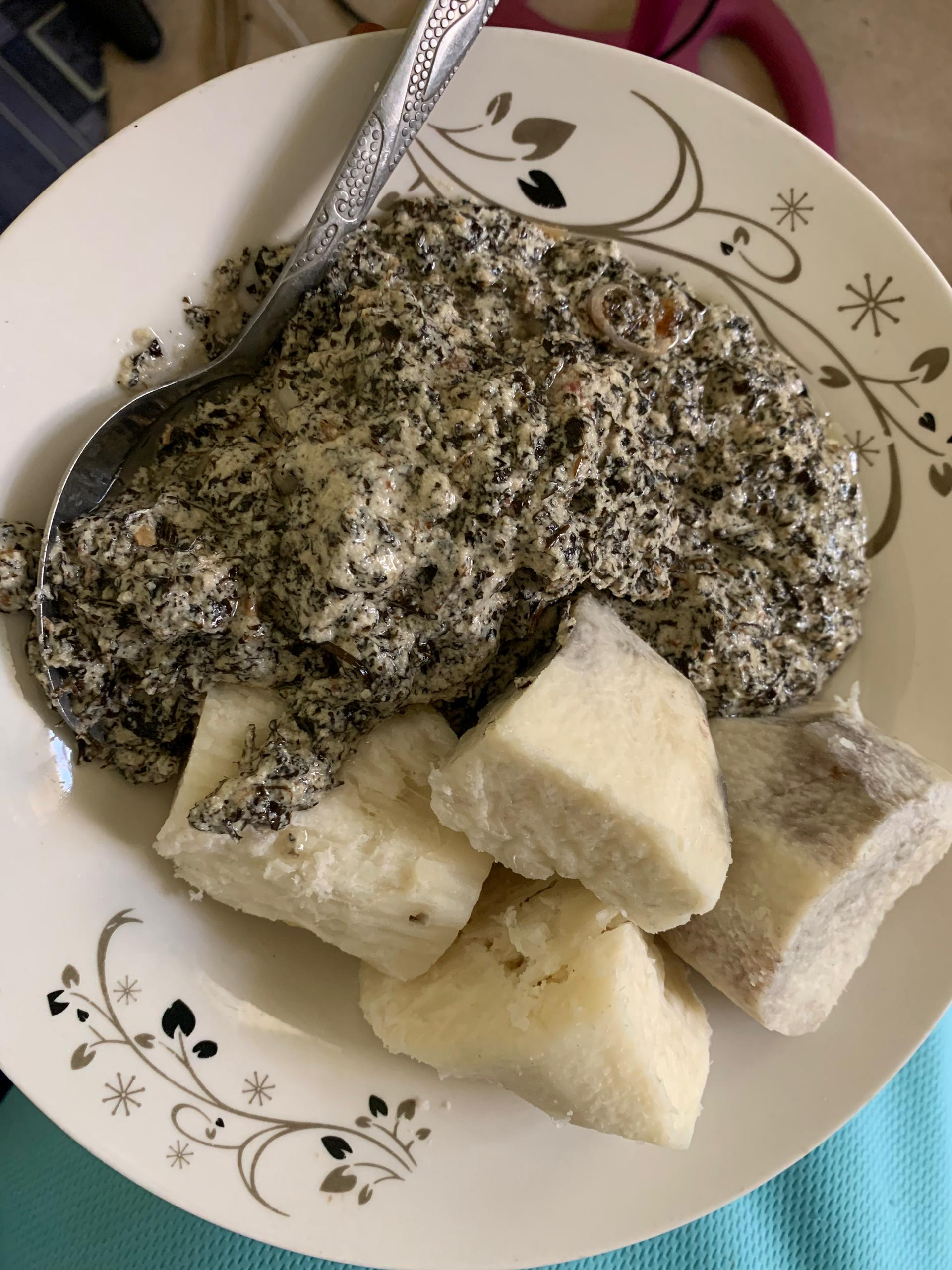
Ndolé served with manioc (cassava) on the side

== See also ==
- Cameroonian cuisine
- Cassava-based dishes
- List of African dishes
- African cuisine
- List of stews
