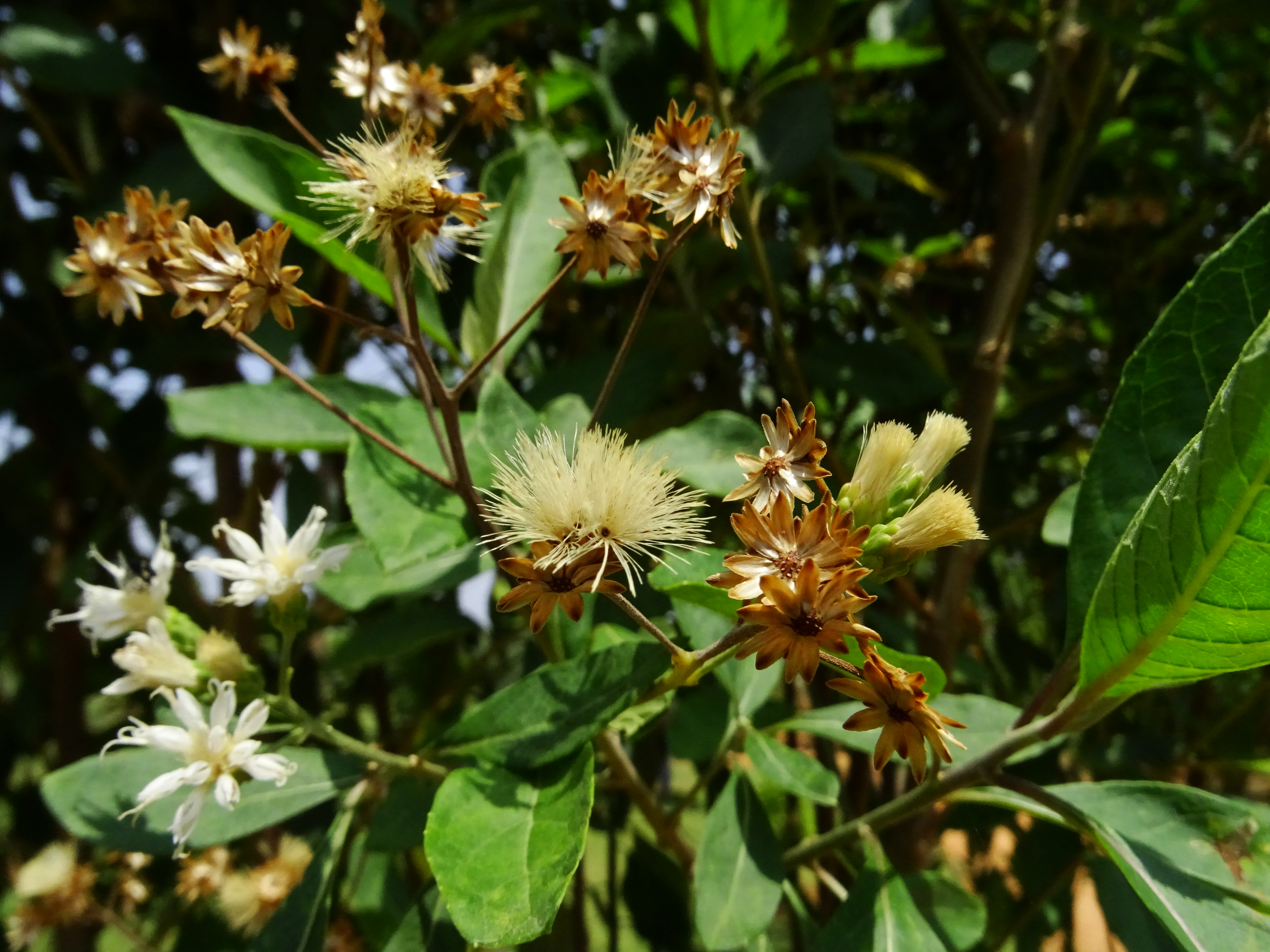

Scientific classification
- Kingdom: Plantae
- Clade: Tracheophytes
- Clade: Angiosperms
- Clade: Eudicots
- Clade: Asterids
- Order: Asterales
- Family: Asteraceae
- Genus: Vernonia
- Species: V. amygdalina

Binomial name
- Vernonia amygdalina Delile

= Vernonia amygdalina =

Species of shrub

Vernonia amygdalina, a member of the daisy family, is a small to medium-sized shrub that grows in tropical Africa. V. amygdalina typically grows to a height of 2–5 m (6.6–16.4 ft). The leaves are elliptical and up to 20 cm (7.9 in) long. Its bark is rough.

V. amygdalina is commonly called bitter leaf in English because of its bitter taste.

== Uses ==
=== Food ===
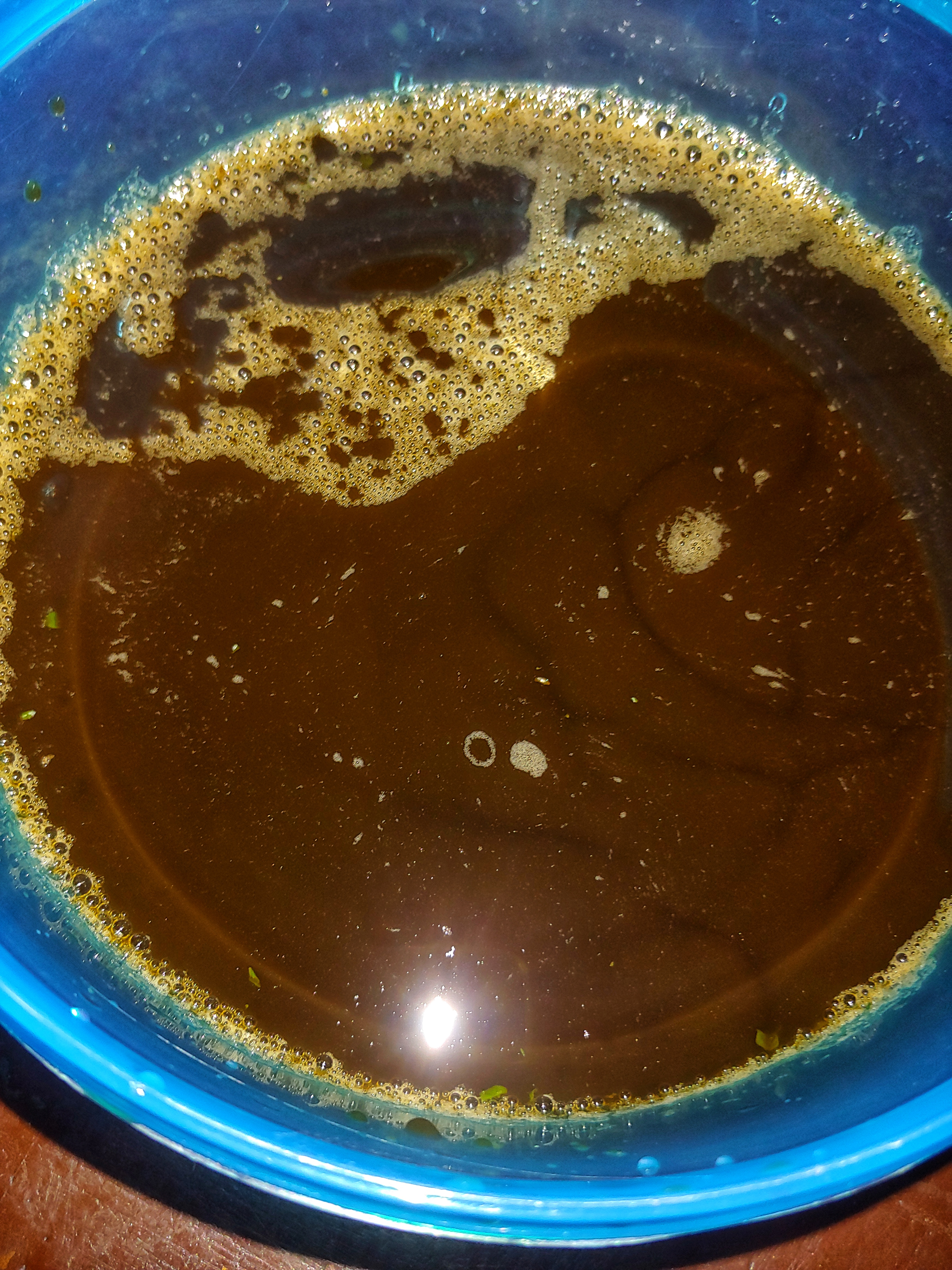
Bitter leaf water in Nigeria

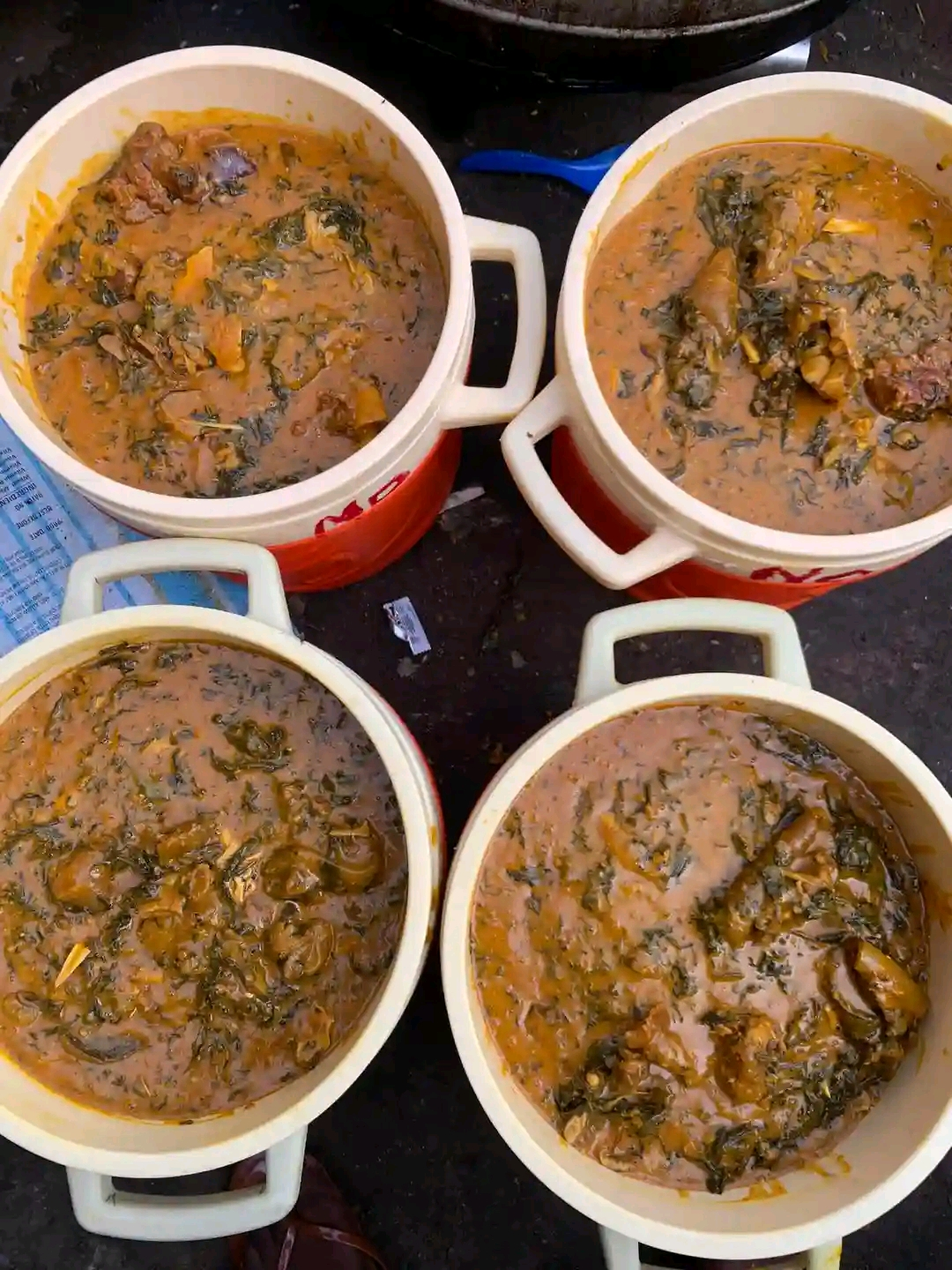
Bitter leaf soup

The leaves are a major ingredient in preparation of ofe onugbu (bitter leaf soup) popular and culturally relevant amongst the Igbo people of Eastern Nigeria. They are dried to reduce breakage before washing to reduce bitterness. In Eastern Nigeria, the water also serves as a stomachache remedy, and leaves are also used in place of hops to brew beer.

In Cameroon the leaves are used to cook Ndole one of its national dishes.

=== Other ===
In Nigeria, twigs and sticks from this plant are used as a chewing stick for dental hygiene and the stems are used for soap in Uganda. In Ghana, the young leaves rather than the old, has gained credence for its potent anti-diabetic and anti-inflammatory activity; and have been proven using animal models.

In the Northern part of Nigeria, it has been added to horse feed to provide a strengthening or fattening tonic called 'Chusar Doki' in Hausa.

== Zoopharmacognosy ==
In the wild, chimpanzees have been observed to ingest the leaves when suffering from parasitic infections.
