= Achu (soup) =

Traditional soup in Cameroon

Achu soup
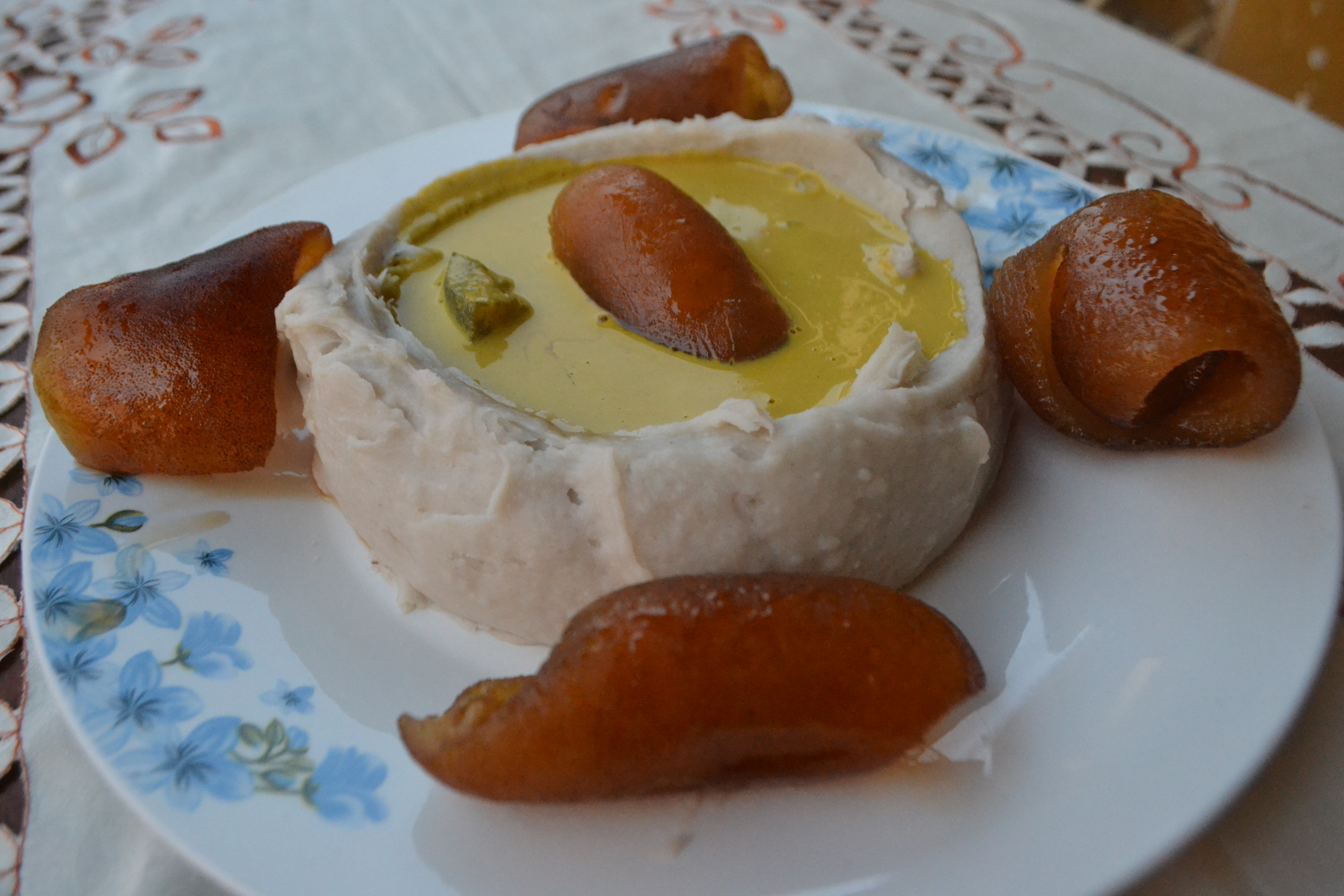
- Achu soup or Yellow soup
- Alternative names: Yellow soup
- Place of origin: Cameroon
- Region or state: Northwest
- Main ingredients: Cocoyam

Achu soup is a yellow soup that is a traditional food in Cameroon. It is made with cocoyam, spices, water, palm oil, "Canwa / Nikki" (limestone), and fish or other ingredients.

== Preparation ==
Achu is made by boiling cocoyams until they are soft. The cocoyams are then pounded into a thick paste and shaped before serving. The yellow soup is prepared separately using palm oil, limestone water, spices, and meat stock mixed together for its special colour and taste. Meat such as beef, cow skin, tripe, fish, or chicken can also be added depending on local preference.

The way Achu is prepared is different in many communities in Cameroon. Some people add more spices and vegetables, while others make it in a simpler traditional way. Achu is usually served hot during family events and cultural celebrations.
