= Koki Ogawa (actor) =

Japanese actor

- 小川 光樹
- Born: May 21, 1998 (age 27); Tokyo, Japan
- Occupations: Actor, tarento
- Years active: April 2003–
- Agent: Horipro Improvement Academy
- Known for: P&G Febreze advertisements

Koki Ogawa (小川 光樹, Ogawa Kōki; born May 21, 1998, in Tokyo, Japan) is a Japanese actor and tarento represented by Horipro Improvement Academy.

== Filmography ==
=== TV series ===
Year	Title	Network	Notes
2004	Kodomo no Gimon!	TV Asahi	
2005	Tokotonhatena	TV Tokyo	

=== Dramas ===
Year	Title	Role	Network	Notes
2003	On'yado Kawasemi		NHK	
2006	Ns' Aoi	Taku Komine	Fuji TV	
2006	Akai Kiseki		TBS	
2006	Nodame Cantabile	Yuto Segawa (child)	Fuji TV	
2006	"Chō" Kowai Hanashi	Mishima Shonen	KBS, TVK, CTV	
2007	Kirakira Kenshui		TBS	
2007	Mama ga Ryōri o Tsukuru Riyū		Fuji TV	
2008	Nekonade	Tochiro Onizuka	KBS, TVK, CTV	

=== Advertisements ===
Year	Title	Notes
2004	McDonald's	
2006	Tokyo Disney Resort	
2007	McDonald's Happy Set	
2007	Mitsubishi Motors SUV Lineup	
2012	P&G Febreze	

=== Films ===
Year	Title	Role	Notes
2007	Yōkai Kidan		
2008	Postman	Teppei Kaieda	
2008	Superior Ultraman 8 Brothers	Madoka Daigo (child)	
2015	Ashita ni Nareba	Kenji Ono	

=== Other ===
Year	Title	Notes
2004	Japan Telecom	
2005	Minustars "Kaba"	
