= Koki Wakasugi =

Japanese footballer

Koki Wakasugi 若杉 好輝
Personal information
- Full name: Koki Wakasugi
- Date of birth: November 8, 1995 (age 31)
- Place of birth: Yamanashi, Japan
- Height: 1.74 m (5 ft 8 1/2 in)
- Position: Midfielder

Team information
- Current team: Tochigi Uva FC
- Number: 27

Youth career
- 2011–2013: Ventforet Kofu U-18

Senior career*
Years	Team	Apps	(Gls)
2014–2017	Ventforet Kofu	0	(0)
2015–2016	→ Saurcos Fukui (loan)	15	(4)
2018–	Tochigi Uva FC		
- * Club domestic league appearances and goals as of 23 February 2018

Koki Wakasugi (若杉 好輝, Wakasugi Kōki) is a Japanese football player for Tochigi Uva FC.

== Playing career ==
Koki Wakasugi was born in Yamanashi Prefecture. He joined to his local club, Ventforet Kofu, in 2014. On June 3, 2015, he debuted in the J.League Cup (v Sanfrecce Hiroshima). In June 2015, he moved to Saurcos Fukui.

== Career statistics ==
Updated to 23 February 2018.

Appearances and goals by club, season and competition
Club	Season	League			Emperor's Cup		J.League Cup		Total	
Club	Season	Division	Apps	Goals	Apps	Goals	Apps	Goals	Apps	Goals
Ventforet Kofu	2014	J1 League	0	0	0	0	0	0	0	0
Ventforet Kofu	2015	J1 League	0	0	—		1	0	1	0
Saurcos Fukui	2015	JRL (Hokushinetsu, Div. 1)	6	0	1	0	—		7	0
Saurcos Fukui	2016	JRL (Hokushinetsu, Div. 1)	9	4	0	0	—		9	4
Ventforet Kofu	2017	J1 League	0	0	0	0	3	0	3	0
Career total			15	4	1	0	4	0	20	4
