= Koki (food) =

Cameroonian cake

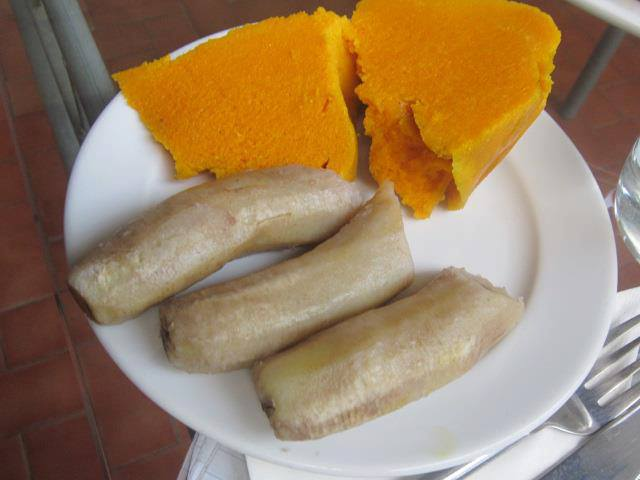
- Alternative names: Gâteau de cornilles (transl. "black-eyed pea cake")
- Course: Main course
- Place of origin: Cameroon
- Serving temperature: Hot or tepid
- Main ingredients: Black-eyed peas, palm oil, chilli pepper, banana leaves for cooking, water

Koki, also known as cowpea cake or black-eyed pea cake, is a Cameroonian dish originating from the Mbo people in the department of Moungo, of the Bazou and Bafang peoples in the Southwest Region, as well as the Makaa, Bassa and Banen peoples of the West Region. Koki is a golden-coloured cake made from either black-eyed peas or cowpeas (Vigna unguiculata) and palm oil, which gives the dish its flavour. The dish is traditionally eaten with plantains.

== Description ==
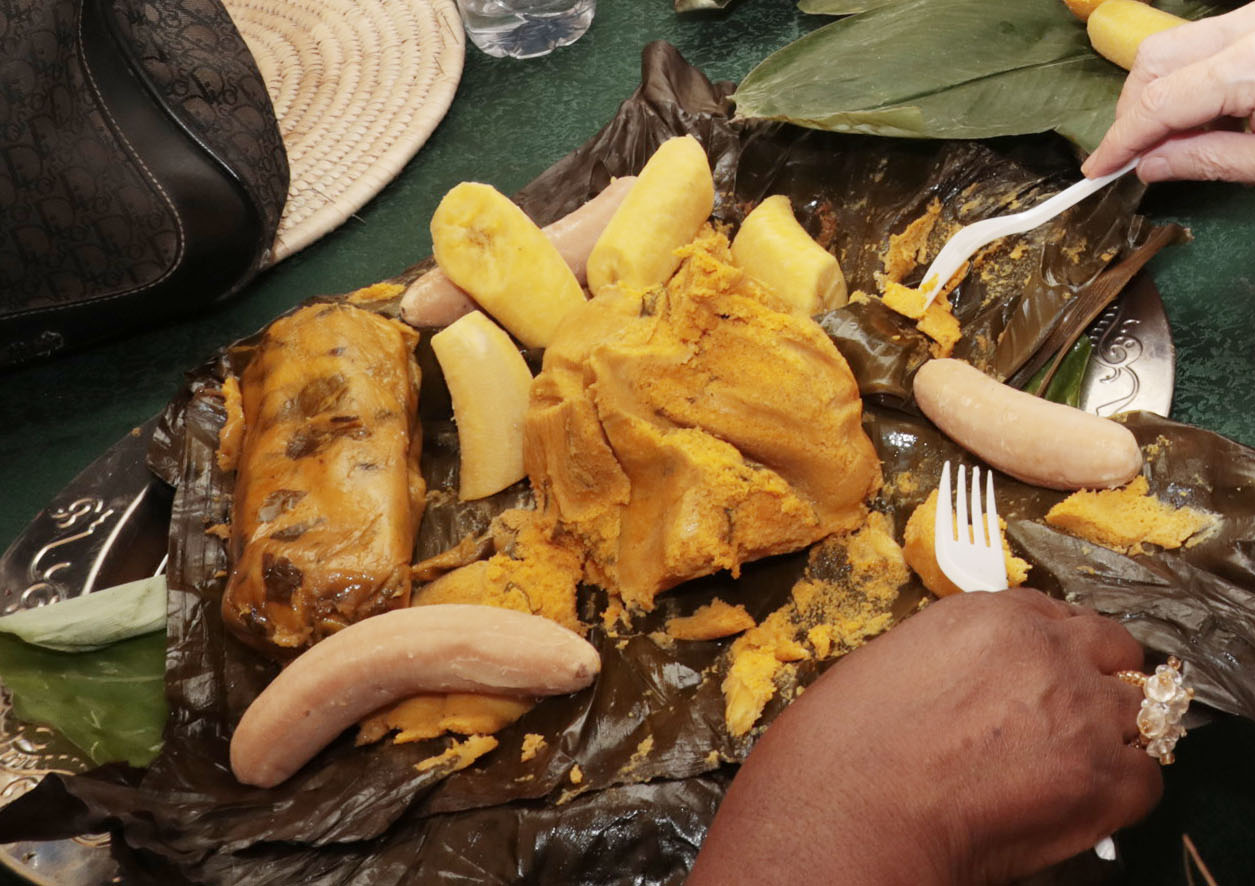
People using forks to eat koki from a leaf

Koki is made with various tubers (like cassava or potato), legumes (including cowpeas and black-eyed peas), and cereals (particularly corn) cooked en papillote, seasoned with palm oil then optionally stuffed with leafy vegetables such as taro and macabo. The paste is wrapped in a banana or cocoyam leaf and then steamed. Koki can also be made into fritters. Koki was traditionally eaten with the hands, but in modern contexts it is more commonly consumed with forks or spoons. It was also originally wrapped exclusively in banana leaves before being boiled, but nowadays paper and aluminium foil are sometimes used as alternatives.

== Background ==
The term 'koki' is etymologically related to the form ekó̱kí, which itself is derived from ko̱ko̱, meaning to pound, grind or crush in the Duala language. Thus, 'koki' means ‘that which is crushed’ or simply ‘culinary paste’. The term can more generally signify 'cake'. The Bazou gastronomic term kekua comes from the gastronomic term koki. A very similar dish is found in Nigeria among the Efik and Yoruba peoples, with the only difference being that it is made from fresh corn.

It is generally claimed that koki originated from a group of peoples in the Littoral, South-West and West regions in Cameroon. This is acknowledged and recorded as such by the Ministry of Arts and Culture, as part of the 111 elements of Cameroon's national intangible cultural heritage, decreed on 21 February 2021. However, the definition used in this document refers only to the variety made with black-eyed peas. This variety of koki is by far the best known and most widespread.

== Gallery ==
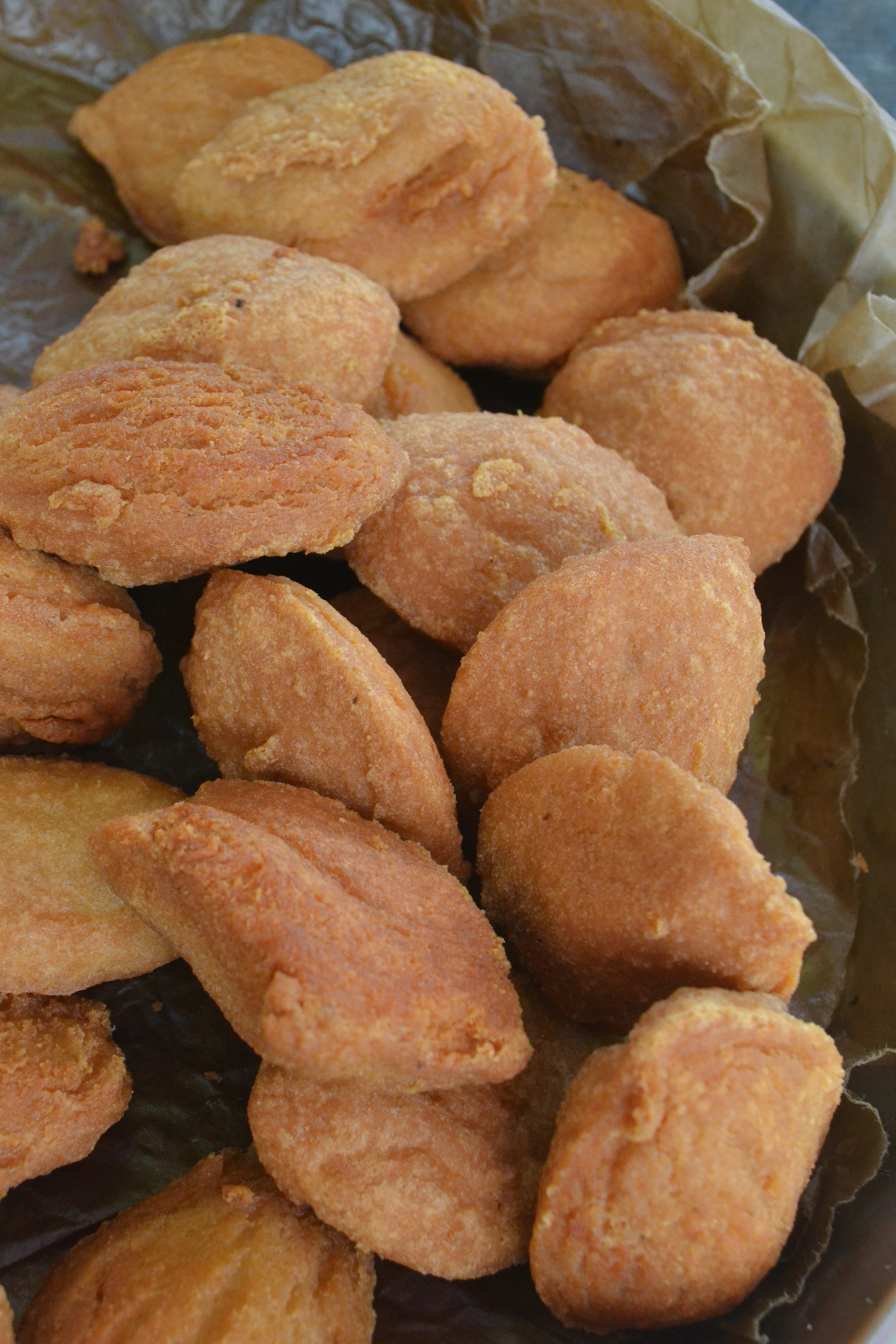
Koki fritters

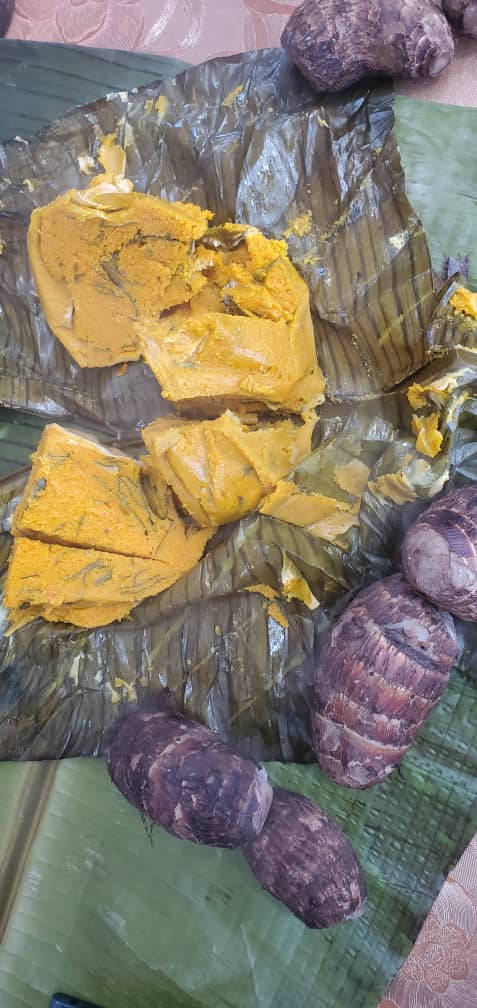
Koki steamed in banana leaves

== See also ==
- Cameroonian cuisine
