= Noriko Ogawa (singer) =

Japanese actress and singer

Noriko Ogawa 小川範子
- Also known as: Shigemi Yoshida
- Born: Shigemi Tanimoto; 20 July 1973; Tachikawa, Tokyo, Japan
- Genres: Pop, kayokyoku
- Occupations: Singer, actress, idol
- Instrument: Vocals
- Years active: 1979–present
- Label: Taurus Records
- Website: noriko-ogawa.com

Noriko Ogawa (小川範子, Ogawa Noriko), born Shigemi Tanimoto (谷本重美, Tanimoto Shigemi), is a Japanese actress and J-pop singer born in Tachikawa, Tokyo, Japan on 20 July 1973. In 1979, she made her acting debut as a child-actress in television drama series Tetsudou Kouankan and, in 1987, her singing debut with the single Namida o Tabanete under Taurus Records. Her alma mater is Waseda University.

== Career ==
At the age of 6, Ogawa made an appearance in the ominous photobook Little Angels Shoujo no Uta published by Hoei TV Production under her real name - Shigemi Tanimoto. During the same time, she made her acting debut as a child actress in the television drama series Tetsudou Kouankan.

At age 7, she made her acting debut as child stage actress in theaters. In 1986, her acting in the television drama Ai no Arashi has been in the centre of attention from both audience and critics. In 1987, she changed her stage name to Noriko Ogawa, and made her singing debut under the same name that year with the single Namida o Tabanete under Taurus Records.

In 1992, Ogawa held her first summer concert tour 92 Dix Neuf Ans. The footage has been recorded into live album and released on the same year. In 1997, she graduated from the sociology department of Waseda University.

After her marriage in 2005, her activities as both an actress and a singer decreased. On the 30th anniversary of her singing debut in 2017, she released the compilation album 30th Anniversary Best which included re-recorded debut songs. In 2020, it was reported that Ogawa is in the charge of the acting audition under her own private agency.

=== Personal life ===
In 2005, she married Japanese actor Akio Yoshida. The announcement was made through the official website.

== Discography ==
=== Singles ===
List of singles, with selected chart positions
Year	Single	Peak chart positions	Formats
Year	Single	JPN Oricon	Formats
1987	"Namida o Tabanete"	13	CD, LP, Cassette
1988	"Eien no Utatane"	12	CD, LP, Cassette
1988	"Kowareru"	6	CD, LP, Cassette
1988	"Glass no Mekakushi"	6	CD, LP, Cassette
1989	"Hitohira"	8	CD, LP, Cassette,
1989	"Natsuiro no Tenshi"	8	CD, LP, Cassette
1989	"Mujitsu no Tsumi"	10	CD, LP, Cassette
1990	"Hitomishiri Angel—Tenshi-tachi no Lesson"	15	CD
1990	"Bathroom no Gensō"	38	CD
1990	"Marionette wa Nemuranai"	37	CD
1991	"Netako o Okosu Komoriuta"	61	CD
1991	"Hachigatsu no Calendar"	48	CD
1992	"Sunao ni Jealousy"	-	CD
1993	"Koi o Shiyō to Omou"	-	CD
1993	"Ai Saresugite"	-	CD
1994	"Requiem"	-	CD
1995	"Shinjite Ii yo ne"	-	CD
1995	"Sorezore no Ai"	-	CD
1996	"Aitai to Omoetanara Ii ne"	-	CD
1996	"Guru Guru Suru Yoru"	-	CD
1999	"Shitchitai to Kingyo"	-	CD
2004	"Nami no Toriko ni Naru yō ni"	-	CD
2005	"Hika Shukumei"	-	CD
"—" denotes items which did not chart.

=== Albums ===
List of albums, with selected chart positions
Title	Album details	Peak positions
Title	Album details	JPN Oricon
Kowareru: Suki to Tsutaete Suki to Kotaete	Released: 24 July 1988; Label: Taurus Records; Formats: CD, LP, Cassette tape	21
Sono Toki	Released: 26 July 1989; Label: Taurus Records; Formats: CD, LP, Cassette tape	23
Kare to Kanojo	Released: 18 July 1990; Label: EMI Music Japan; Formats: CD, Cassette tape	21
Omocha Bako Akenai	Released: 27 September 1991; Label: Taurus Records; Formats: CD, Cassette tape	83
Doushite Kon'nani Suki Nandarou	Released: 12 August 1992; Label: Taurus Records; Formats: CD, Cassette tape	-
Koi wo Shiyou to Omou	Released: 29 September 1993; Label: Taurus Records; Formats: CD	-
Hito Kui hi to ku I (as OGAWA)	Released: 20 July 2000; Label: Taurus Records; Formats: CD	-
Hoozuki (as OGAWA)	Released: 7 October 2001; Label: Taurus Records; Formats: CD	-
Tada Ai no Tame ni: Aimez-moi pour amour	Released: 30 November 2002; Label: Universal Music Japan; Formats: CD	-
"—" denotes items which did not chart.

=== EPs ===
List of albums, with selected chart positions
Title	Album details	Peak positions
Title	Album details	JPN Oricon
Namida wo Tabanete: Anata e no Hitorigoto	Released: 25 December 1987; Label: Taurus Records; Formats: CD, LP, Cassette tape	34
Glass no Mekakushi: Kiyoraka na Yoru Hitori de...	Released: 4 December 1988; Label: Taurus Records; Formats: CD, LP, Cassette tape	18
Mujitsu no Tsumi: Aenai Yoru Anata ga Tooi	Released: 8 December 1989; Label: Taurus Records; Formats: CD, LP, Cassette tape	45
Koukishin	Released: 5 December 1990; Label: Taurus Records; Formats: CD, Cassette tape	35
Request	Released: 5 December 1992; Label: Taurus Records; Formats: CD, Cassette tape	-
"—" denotes items which did not chart.

=== Compilation albums ===
List of albums, with selected chart positions
Title	Album details	Peak positions
Title	Album details	JPN Oricon
Gin'yuu Shoujo	Released: 28 March 1990; Label: Taurus Records; Formats: CD, Cassette tape	35
Remix Best Hachi-gatsu no Calendar	Released: 20 December 1991; Label: Taurus Records; Formats: CD, Cassette tape	-
Super Value	Released: 19 December 2001; Label: Taurus Records; Formats: CD	-
Golden Best Ogawa Noriko: Taurus Single Collection	Released: 1 March 2006; Label: Universal Music Japan; Formats: CD, digital download	-
Ogawa Noriko Album Best Self Selection: Mahou no Recipe	Released: 21 November 2007; Label: Universal Music Japan; Formats: CD	-
Kowareru+Sonotoki	Released: 13 November 2013; Label: Universal Music Japan; Formats: CD, digital download	-
30th Anniversary Best	Released: 13 November 2013; Label: Universal Music Japan; Formats: CD	121
"—" denotes items which did not chart.

=== Live albums ===
List of albums, with selected chart positions
Title	Album details	Peak positions
Title	Album details	JPN Oricon
Ogawa Noriko Summer Concert '92 Dix Neuf Ans	Released: 28 October 1992; Label: Taurus Records; Formats: VHS, LD	35
"—" denotes items which did not chart.

== Filmography ==
=== Television ===
- Ai no Arashi (1986), young adult Hikaru (Japanese adaptation of Wuthering Heights)

== Books ==
- 写真集『こわしたくない...』（講談社）1988年
- 写真集『季節絵日記』（ワニブックス）1989年
- 吟遊少女 （CBS・ソニー出版）1989年
- 写真集『TAKAN』（白泉社）1990年
- 小川範子のおっこらせ日記 フォトエッセイ集（角川書店）1990年
- 夢・シンフォニー 小川範子(文)+おおた慶文(画) （白泉社）1991年
- 月刊 小川範子（新潮社）2000年

== Video game ==
On December 4, 1988, Hudson Soft released a dating sim video game titled No-Ri-Ko starring Ogawa. The game was released as a launch title for the PC Engine CD-ROM² along with Fighting Street, a port of Street Fighter. No-Ri-Ko was one of the first video games ever released for the CD-ROM format and is an early example of digital multimedia. In the game, players take Ogawa out on a date and can choose to take her to up to four different locations around Tokyo. For the game, Ogawa provided full voice acting, a large number of digitally scanned photographs, and portions of her discography.
