= Yoshimi Ogawa =

Japanese businessman

Yoshimi Ogawa (小川善美, born 1966) is the current president of Index Holdings a mobile content provider based in Tokyo.

== Career ==
Ogawa was, in 2002, the youngest female entrepreneur to lead a technology firm in Japan, being profiled in The Nikkei Woman Online website for her role in developing BowLingual with Tomy.

Ogawa made investments outside the technology field, such buying the French football team Grenoble Foot 38. By 2013 Index Holdings eventually became insolvent and found to be in bankruptcy in 2014.

== Court case ==
On June 15 of 2015, Ogawa together with her husband were found to be in violation of the Financial Instruments and Exchange Act by failing to report ¥600 million in losses for 2012 and submitting a false annual securities report. The case was brought before the Tokyo District Court and still ongoing.
