= Koki Ogawa =

Koki Ogawa may refer to:

- Koki Ogawa (actor) (小川 光樹; born 1998), Japanese actor
- Kōki Ogawa (footballer) (小川 航基; born 1997), Japanese footballer
