= SUNY Eye Institute =

Research consortium in New York state

Coordinates: 43.044742°N 76.137346°W

The SUNY Eye Institute (SEI) is a consortium of scientists from five campuses within the State University of New York. Participating institutions include four SUNY medical schools (Downstate Medical Center, Upstate Medical University, Stony Brook University Medical Center, and the University at Buffalo) and the SUNY College of Optometry. The SEI was organized in 2007 and formally recognized by SUNY in 2009. Its aims are (1) to foster collaboration among SUNY research scientists in support of research on all aspects of visual function, with an emphasis on diseases of the human eye and their treatment, and (2) to enhance training in clinical and basic visual sciences in the U.S. State of New York. It receives financial support from SUNY through the SUNY REACH program.

In October 2010 the SEI had 55 member scientists with primary faculty appointments. Scientific research largely overlaps with the mandate of the National Eye Institute (NEI), a part of the National Institutes of Health. The NEI provides the bulk of direct funding for research at the SEI through approximately 40 research grants to individual faculty scientists.

The SEI convenes annually in early fall for a two-day scientific meeting. The meeting was held at the College of Optometry in Manhattan in 2009, at the Upstate campus in Syracuse, NY in 2010, at Stony Brook campus in 2011, and at Buffalo campus in 2012. The SEI sponsors pilot projects and hosts several lecture series that are broadcast between member campuses.
