= Kondreh (food) =

Cameroonian stew

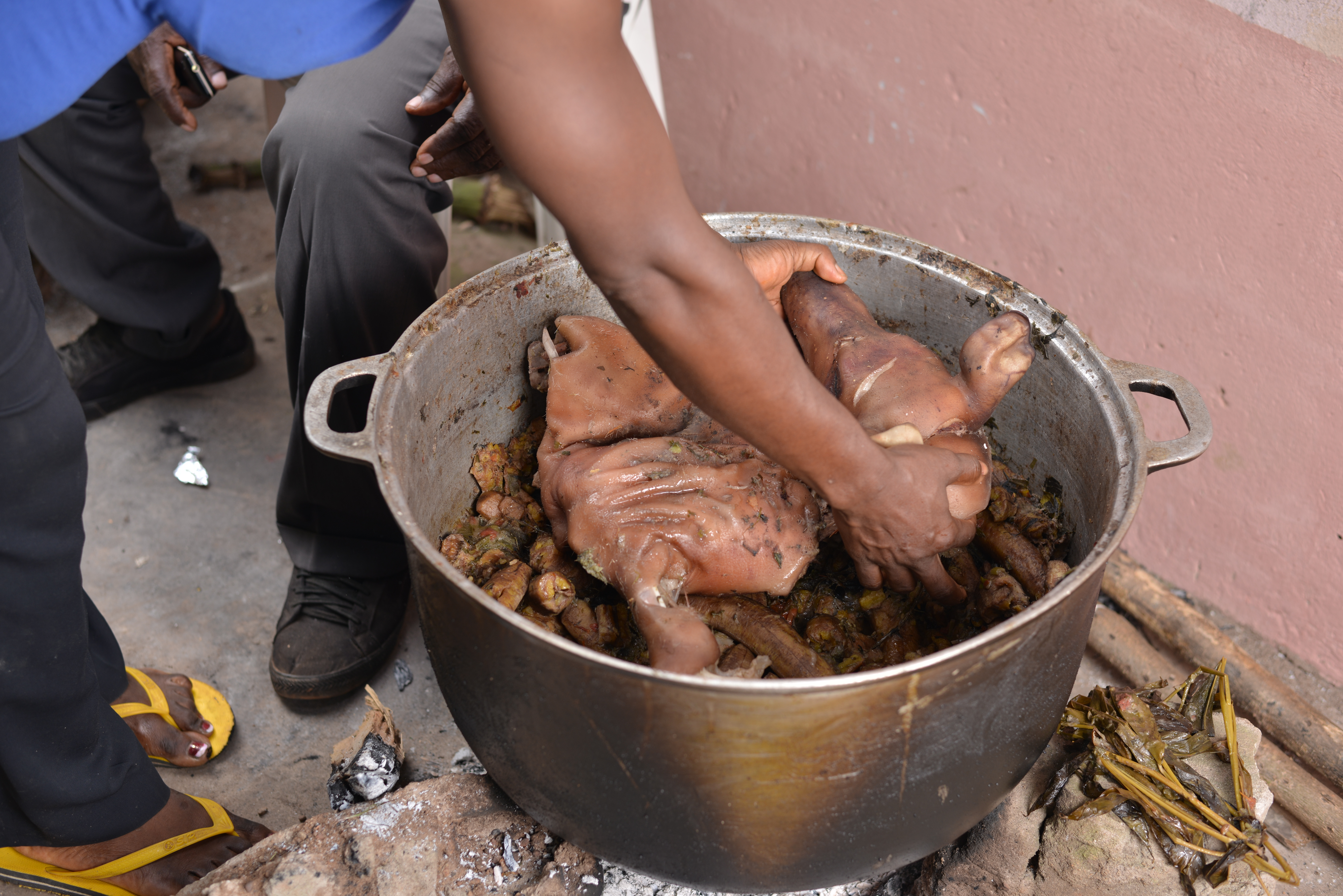
- Preparation of kondreh in a cooking pot
- Alternative names: Nkondré
- Course: Main course
- Region or state: Western Cameroon
- Main ingredients: Plantains, goat meat

Kondreh, also spelled Nkondrè, is a traditional Cameroonian dish originating the Bamileke people in the West Region, particularly from Bafang. It is considered a national dish of Cameroon. It is often served at important events, such as traditional ceremonies, weddings and funerals, as a symbol of hospitality and respect in Cameroonian culture.

Kondreh is a stew principally made with cooking bananas and goat meat. The main spices used in the preparation of kondreh are white and black pepper, round slices, pébé (Cameroonian nutmeg), garlic, thyme, and bay leaves.
