= Aya Ogawa =

Aya Ogawa may refer to:

- Aya Ogawa (playwright) (born 1974), a Japanese American theater artist and translator
- Aya Ogawa (singer) (born 2007), a Japanese singer
