= Penja pepper =

Pepper grown in the Penja Valley, Cameroon

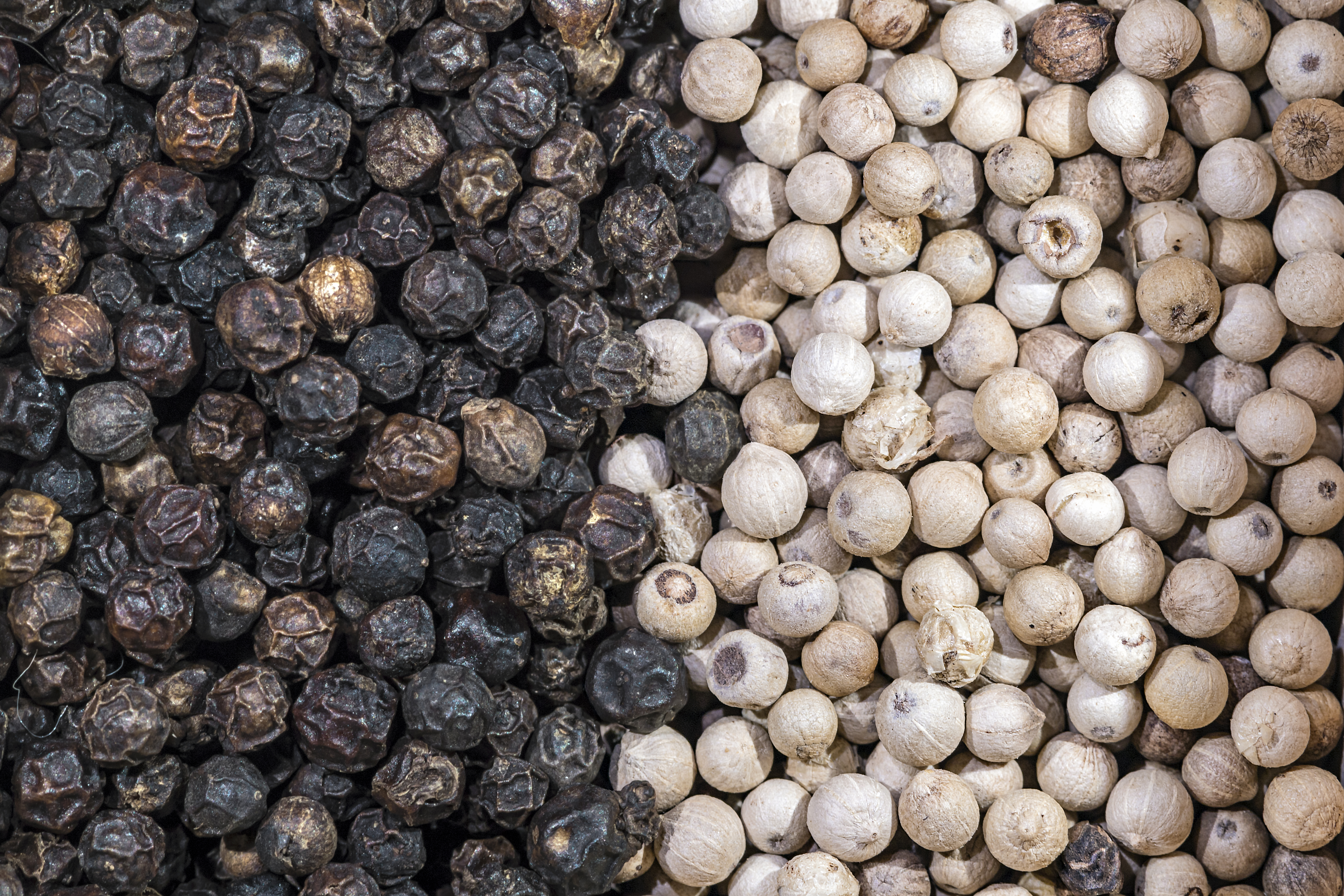
Penja black and white pepper

Penja pepper (poivre de Penja) is a type of pepper (Piper nigrum) grown in the volcanic soil of the Penja Valley in Cameroon. It is available as green, white, black and red pepper. Its taste is influenced by the local volcanic soil, which is rich in minerals. Under the name "poivre de Penja", the pepper is protected as a geographical indication in the 17 African OAPI countries under the Bangui agreement, as well as a Protected Geographical Indication in the European Union and Northern Ireland.

== History ==
Pepper culture was introduced into Cameroon by Antoine Decré, who had a banana plantation in Penja. The first export, a bag of 40 kg of white pepper, took place in March 1958.

The pepper became popular with Michelin-star chefs and was being sold for as much as €321 per kilogram as of May 2016.

== Sources ==
- La presse du Cameroun, n° 2371, Thursday 20 March 1958
