= Hejira (band) =

British jazz band

- Origin: Oxford, England
- Genres: Jazz, folk
- Years active: 2022-present

Hejira is a British 7-piece band, set up to celebrate the major works of Joni Mitchell. Their repertoire broadly covers the 'great' songs from 'Court and Spark' through to 'Wild Things Run Fast'.The group was created by Pete Oxley of The Spin jazz club in Oxford for a one-off Joni Mitchell Christmas special concert in 2022, and has since carried on touring and performing. In 2024, they produced a live recording on both CD and L.S.L. formats. (L.S.L.: 'Look. Scan. Listen.' The L.S.L. format is an innovation by Stuart Miller and Pete Oxley where the music is accessed via QR codes which are presented in a hard-back book, providing space for lyrics, liner notes, images, interviews etc., in addition to the music content.) They base the majority of their repertoire on Mitchell's 1979 live album Shadows and Light, but also perform work by Mitchell's collaborators and the band members. Hejira began touring Britain from 2023 and continues to tour the UK and Ireland. They have produced a dozen high-quality videos for Youtube and have received critical acclaim from such respected authors as Ted Gioia.

== Band Members ==
Current Members:

- Pete Oxley — guitar
- Hattie Whitehead — vocals, guitar
- Ollie Weston — tenor and soprano sax, bass clarinet
- Chris Eldred — keyboards
- Dave Jones — fretted & fretless basses
- Rick Finlay — drums
- Marc Cecil — percussion
