= Riz gras =

West African dish

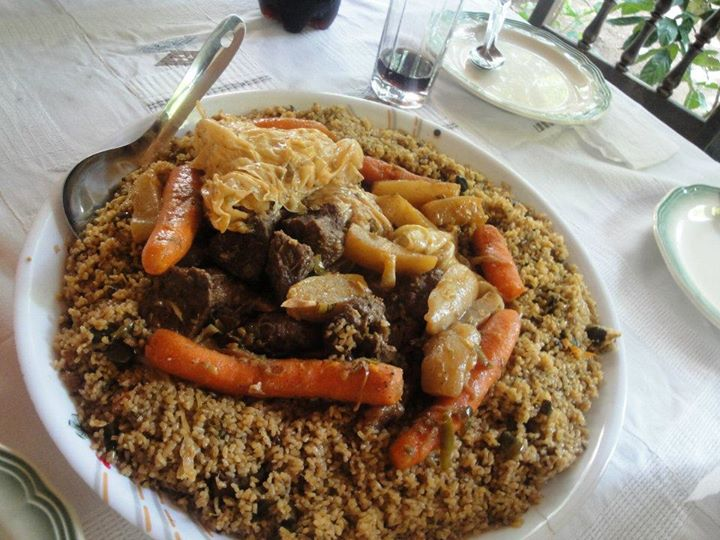
- A serving of riz gras in Côte d'Ivoire
- Alternative names: Riz au gras
- Place of origin: Burkina Faso, West Africa
- Serving temperature: Hot
- Main ingredients: Rice, meat, vegetables
- Similar dishes: Ceebu jën, Jollof rice

Riz gras or riz au gras is a rice-based dish in Beninese, Burkinabé, Guinean, Ivorian, and Togolese cuisines, in West Africa. It is also prepared in other African countries, such as Senegal, where it is called tiebou djen and is prepared with significant amounts of fish and meat. This dish can be considered a variation of what is known as jollof rice in English-speaking West Africa.

Riz gras is often served at parties in urban areas of Burkina Faso. Riz gras is prepared with significant amounts of meat and vegetables, and is usually served with the meat and chunks of vegetables presented atop the rice. Additional ingredients used include tomatoes, eggplant, bell peppers, carrots, cabbage, onion, garlic, meat or vegetable stock, oil and salt.

== Gallery ==
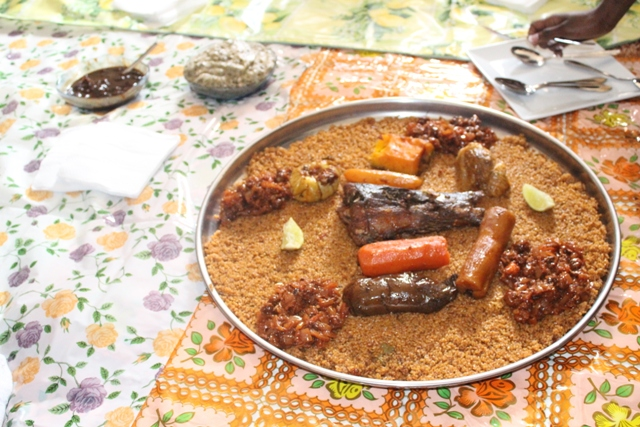
Riz gras

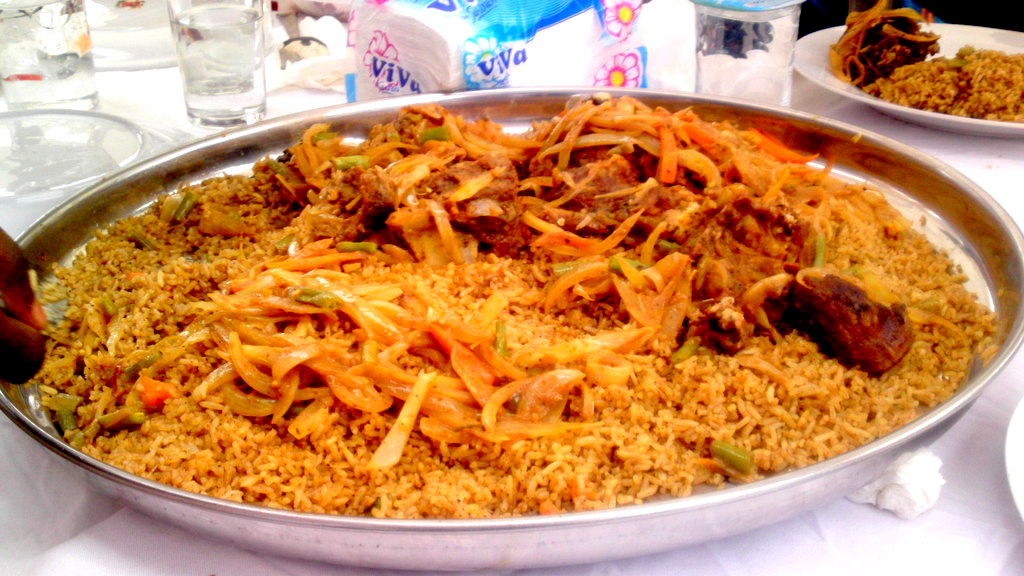
Riz gras with beef

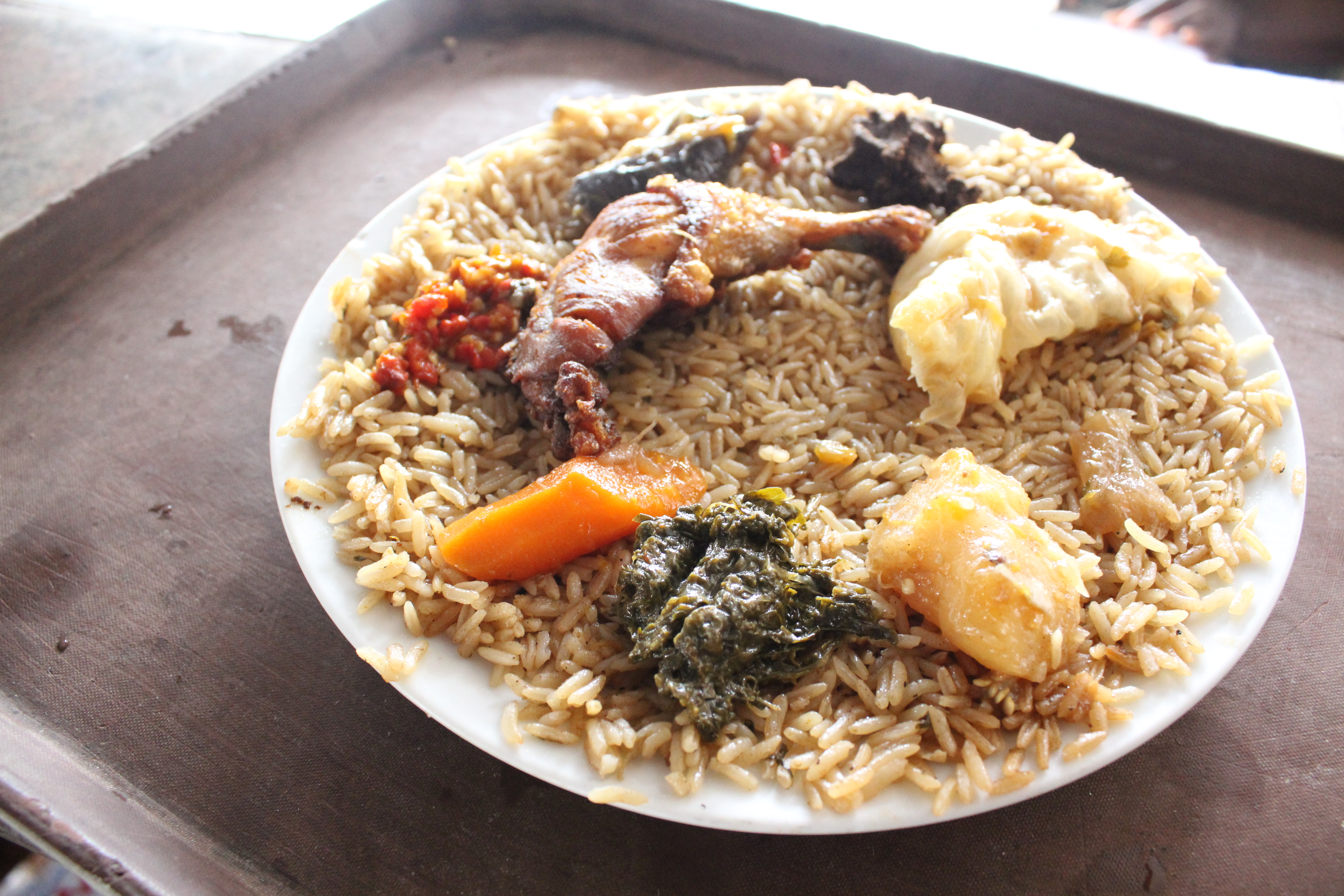
Riz gras with chicken and vegetables

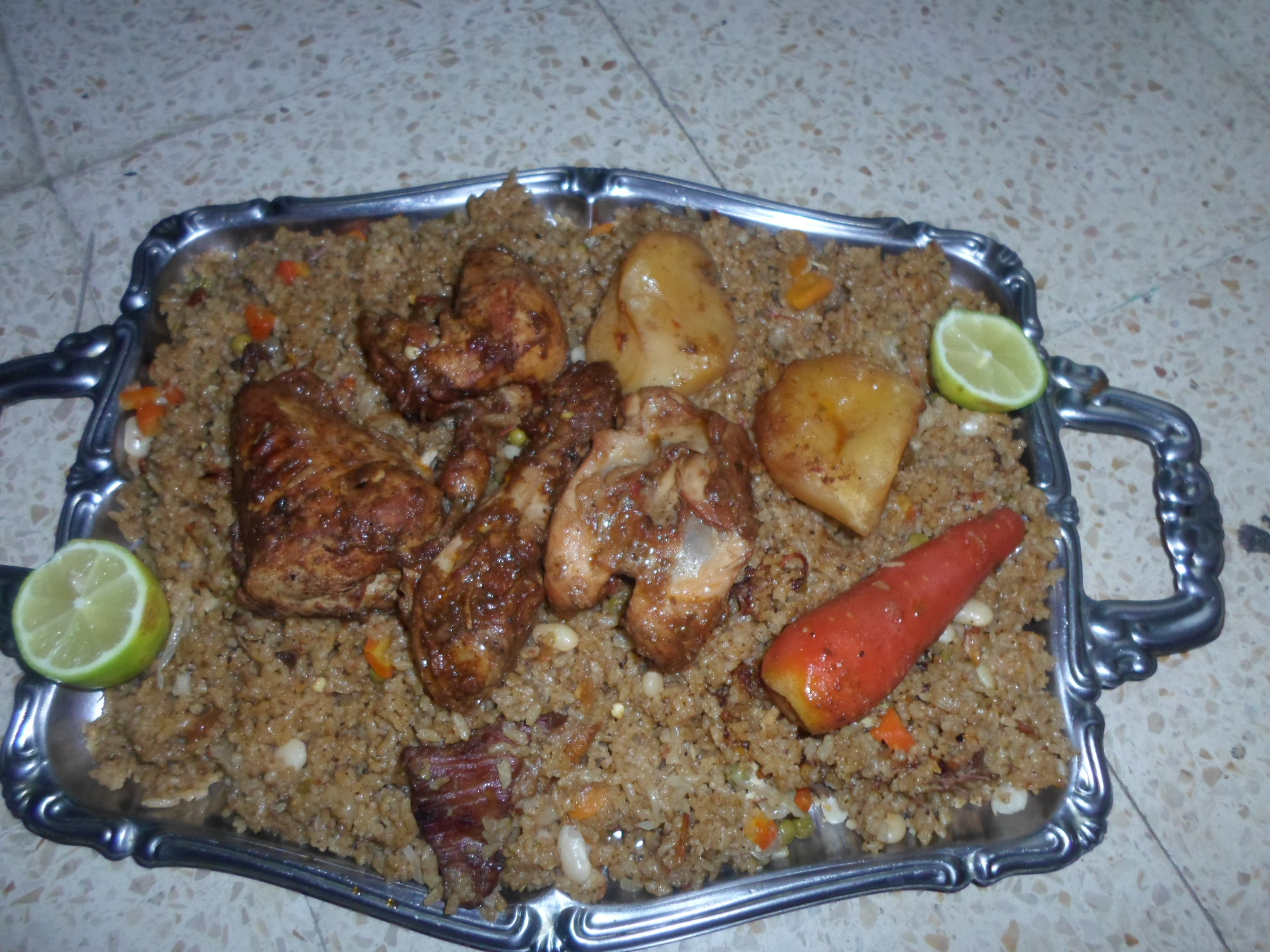
Riz gras in Guinea

== See also ==
- List of rice dishes
- Sindhi biryani
- Burkinabe cuisine
- Ceebu jën
