= Ozoz Sokoh =

Nigerian writer and food historian

- Born: 1976 (age 49–50); Warri, Nigeria
- Education: University of Liverpool
- Occupation: Nigerian food writer
- Years active: 2007 - present
- Website: www.kitchenbutterfly.com

Ozoz Sokoh (born 1976) is a Nigerian culinary writer, food historian, recipe developer, and culinary anthropologist. She has organized events around Nigerian foodways, including the first World Jollof Day in 2017.

== Early life and education ==
Sokoh was born in 1976 in Warri, on the southern coast of Nigeria. She attended the Obafemi Awolowo University in Ile-Ife, Nigeria for 3 years, studying Urban and Regional Planning, and left in 1997. She moved to the United Kingdom where she earned a degree in Geology from the University of Liverpool. During her time in the UK, she began cooking Nigerian food to feel closer to home. According to Sokoh, she created her first recipe in 1998 while living and going to school in the UK.

== Career ==
After graduating from the University of Liverpool, Sokoh worked as a geologist. She began a culinary blog, Kitchen Butterfly, and blogged about Nigerian food while she lived and worked in the Netherlands from 2007 to 2011. She developed recipes.

Upon her return to Nigeria in 2011, she began researching familiar Nigerian ingredients and their uses from the perspective of culinary anthropology. She researched and presented a documentary on Agege bread, a staple in Nigeria, for ‘For Africans’.

In 2018 Sokoh created Feast Afrique, an online curated collection of books relating to the culinary history of West Africa and its diaspora. This collection includes a digital library of 240+ West African and diasporic culinary and literary resources. She has researched and written about the connections between the foods of West Africa and the foods of nations that engaged in the slave trade.

She organized the first World Jollof Day in 2017. The festival is held to celebrate Jollof rice, a dish that is ubiquitous in West Africa and the region's best known dish worldwide. She has created ‘Eat The Book’ experiences, celebrating African food from African writing by creating the dishes at literary and arts festivals. She was the co-organiser of Abori Food System Design Summit, which was held at Alliance Française, Lagos in 2019 and featured food exhibitions, discussions and a farmer's market.

In 2020, while a Forecast mentee, Sokoh produced Coast to Coast, a documentary about the spread of West African food through the diaspora.

== Personal life ==
As of 2021, Sokoh lived in Ontario, Canada. She has children.
