= Jollof rice =

Rice dish from West Africa

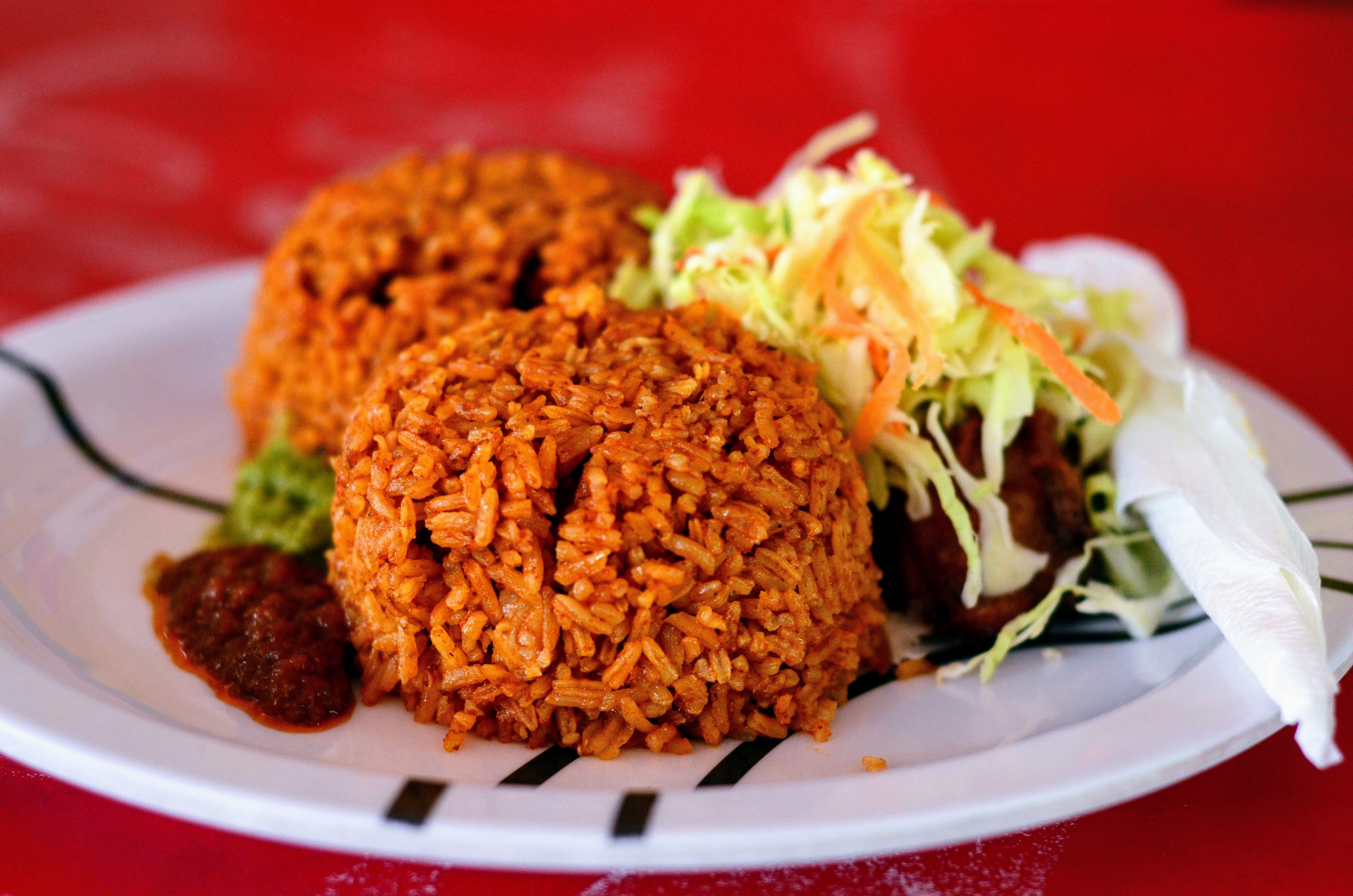
- Jollof rice with stew and garnish
- Alternative names: Benachin, riz au gras, ceebu jën, zaamè
- Type: Rice dish
- Course: Main course
- Place of origin: Saint Louis, Senegal
- Region or state: West Africa
- Serving temperature: Hot
- Main ingredients: Rice, tomatoes and tomato paste, onions, chili peppers, cooking oil
- Ingredients generally used: Herbs, spices, aromatics
- Variations: Various meat and seafood versions vegetables and chicken

Jollof (/dʒəˈlɒf/), or jollof rice, is a rice dish from Senegal, West Africa. It is typically made with long-grain rice, tomatoes, chilis, onions, spices, and sometimes other vegetables and/or meat in a single pot, although its ingredients and preparation methods vary across different regions.

Regional variations are a source of competition among the countries of West Africa, and in particular between Nigeria and Ghana. In the 2010s this developed into a friendly rivalry known as the "Jollof wars".

In French-speaking West Africa, a variation of the dish is known as riz au gras. The Senegalese version, thieboudienne, has been recognized by UNESCO as an intangible cultural heritage dish.

== History and origin ==
The Jolof or Wolof Empire was a confederacy state that ruled parts of West Africa situated in modern-day Senegal, Mali, The Gambia and Mauritania from around the 12th century and was later known as the Jolof Kingdom. According to African food historian Fran Osseo-Asare, the origins of jollof rice can be traced to the area, where rice was grown; the original dish was known as thieboudienne or thiebou djeun, and contains rice, fish, shellfish and vegetables. If made with meat, it is called ceebu yapp. The fishing communities of Saint-Louis are considered the birthplace of thieboudienne.

Food and agriculture historian James C. McCann argued that it was unlikely that the dish could have naturally spread from Senegal to its current range since a similar cultural diffusion is not seen in "linguistic, historical or political patterns". Instead, he proposed that the dish spread with the Mali empire, especially the Djula tradespeople who dispersed widely to the regional commercial and urban centers, taking with them economic arts of "blacksmithing, small-scale marketing, and rice agronomy" as well as the religion of Islam.

Marc Dufumier, an emeritus professor of agronomy, proposes a more recent origin for the dish, which may only have appeared as a consequence of the colonial promotion of intensive peanut cropping in central Senegal for the French oil industry, and where commensurate reduction in the planted area of traditional millet and sorghum staples was compensated for by imports of broken rice from Southeast Asia. This gave local cooks no choice but to use the then-unfamiliar product.

The use of New World tomatoes, tomato paste, capsicum peppers (bell, chili, paprika), Indian curry powder, Mediterranean thyme, and Asian rice varieties, may limit the origin of the current dish to no earlier than the 19th century, there being no evidence of the ingredients being locally cultivated or imported before this period. In Senegal, oral histories credit Penda Mbaye, a cook at the residence of one of the colonial rulers in Saint-Louis, Senegal, as having created the dish when she ran out of barley and substituted rice.

== Geographical range and variants ==
Jollof rice is one of the most common dishes in West Africa. There are several regional variations in name and ingredients; for example, in Mali it is called zaamè in Bamanankan. The dish's most common name of jollof derives from the name of the Wolof people, though in Senegal, Mauritania and The Gambia the dish is referred to in Wolof as ceebu jën or benachin. In French-speaking areas, it is called riz au gras. Despite the variations, the dish is "mutually intelligible" across the regions and has become the best known African dish outside the continent. It is found throughout the world wherever communities of West African immigrants have developed.

== Ingredients and preparation ==
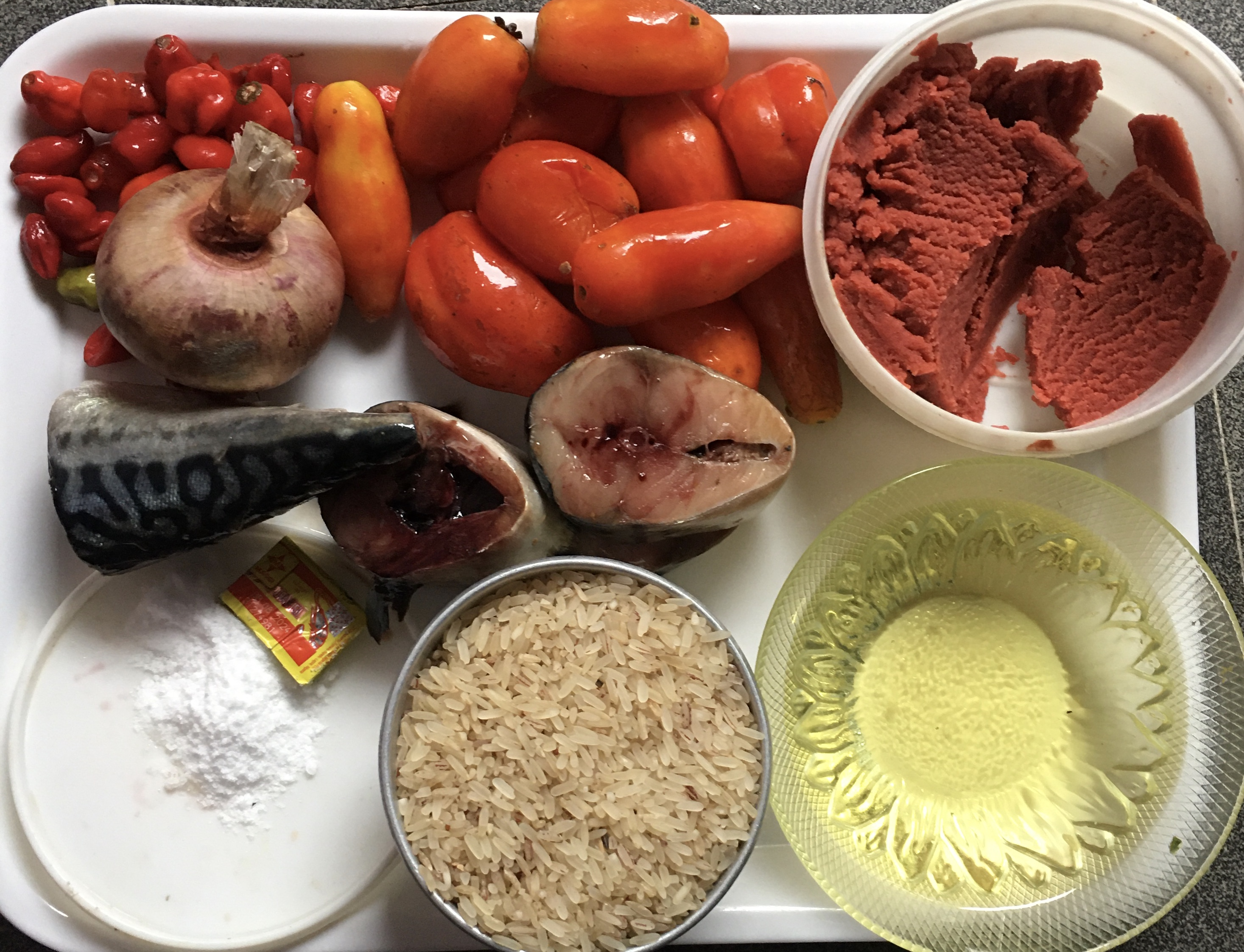
Typical ingredients for a jollof with fish, clockwise from top left: chili peppers, tomatoes, tomato paste, ground nut oil, rice, salt, bouillon cube, fish, onion

Jollof rice traditionally consists of rice, cooking oil, tomato puree, onion, salt, chilies, and often some combination of other ingredients such as tomato paste, bell pepper, garlic, ginger, thyme, curry powder, bay leaves, grains of selim, and bouillon cubes or stock; recipes vary from country to country and cook to cook. Chicken, turkey, beef, lamb or fish are often cooked with or served with the dish. In some countries, other vegetables such as cabbage, green peas, or carrots are included.

Some recipes call for long grain rice, some for short grain, some for broken rice, others for parboiled rice. Typically the tomato puree, tomato paste, onions, salt and chillies are sauteed in oil and simmered into a sauce in which the rice is then cooked.

== Jollof wars ==
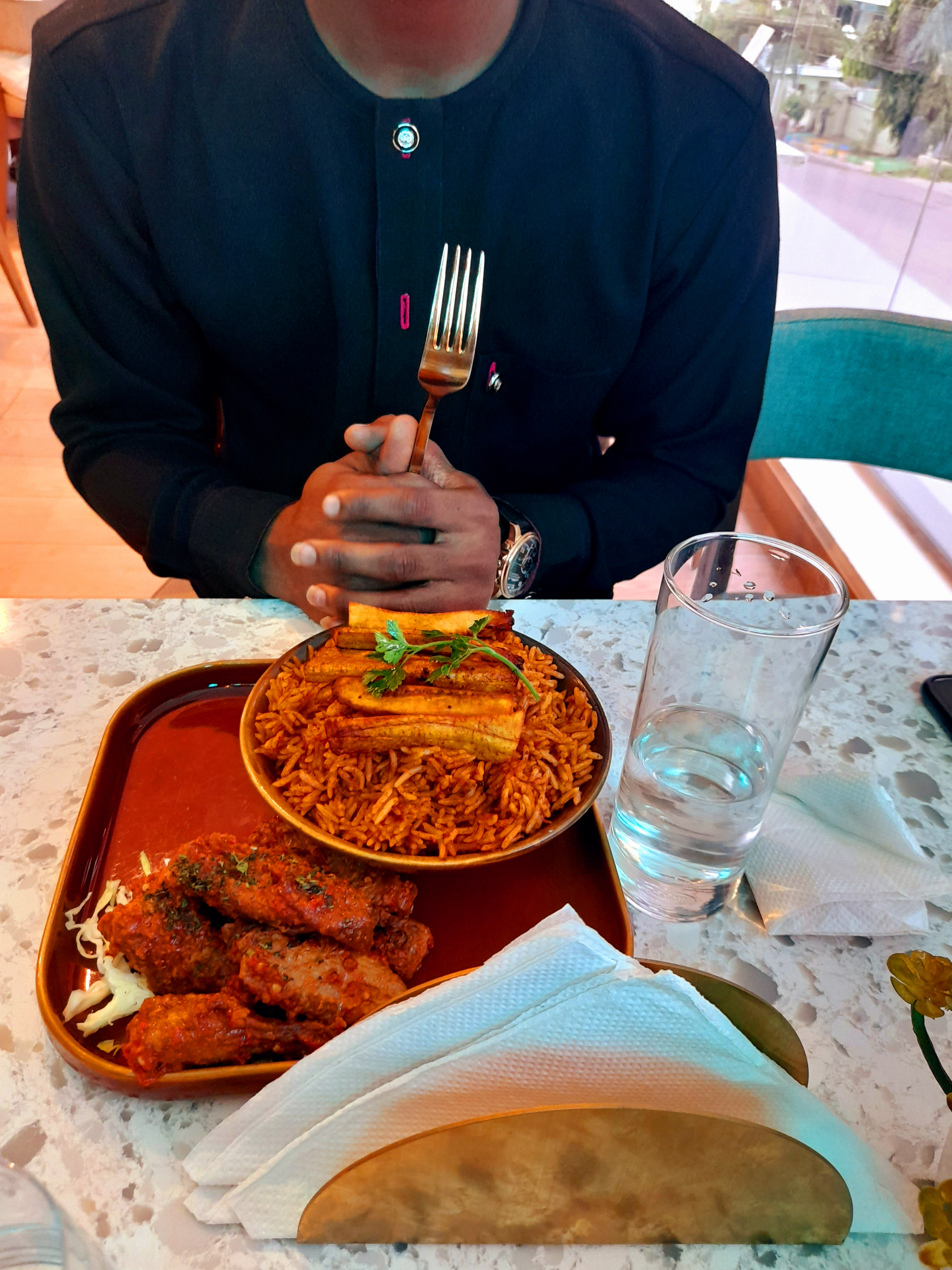
Jollof rice

West African countries typically have at least one variant form of the dish, with Ghana, Nigeria, Sierra Leone, Liberia and Cameroon particularly competitive as to which country makes the best jollof. In the mid-2010s this expanded into the "Jollof Wars".

The gastronationalism rivalry is especially prominent between Nigeria and Ghana, and has led to various events, including cooking competitions and social media campaigns, fostering cultural pride. In 2016, Sister Deborah released the song "Ghana Jollof", which denigrated the Nigerian version and Nigerians for being proud of their version. Soon after, a physical fight over insufficient jollof supplies at a Ghanaian political rally sparked delighted mocking of Ghanaians by Nigerians.

Of particular sensitivity in jollof-making communities is the inclusion of non-traditional ingredients, which are defined country to country and are seen as making the jollof inauthentic. In 2014, a recipe released by Jamie Oliver that included cherry tomatoes, coriander, lemon, and parsley, none of which are used in any traditional recipe, caused outraged reactions, including the hashtag #jollofgate trending on social media, to the point Oliver's team chose to issue a statement.

== Regional variations ==
=== Cameroon ===
The Cameroonian version, sometimes called fried rice, often includes red peppers, carrots, green beans and smoked paprika.

=== The Gambia ===
Smoked snails are a traditional ingredient in Gambian cuisine.

=== Ghana ===
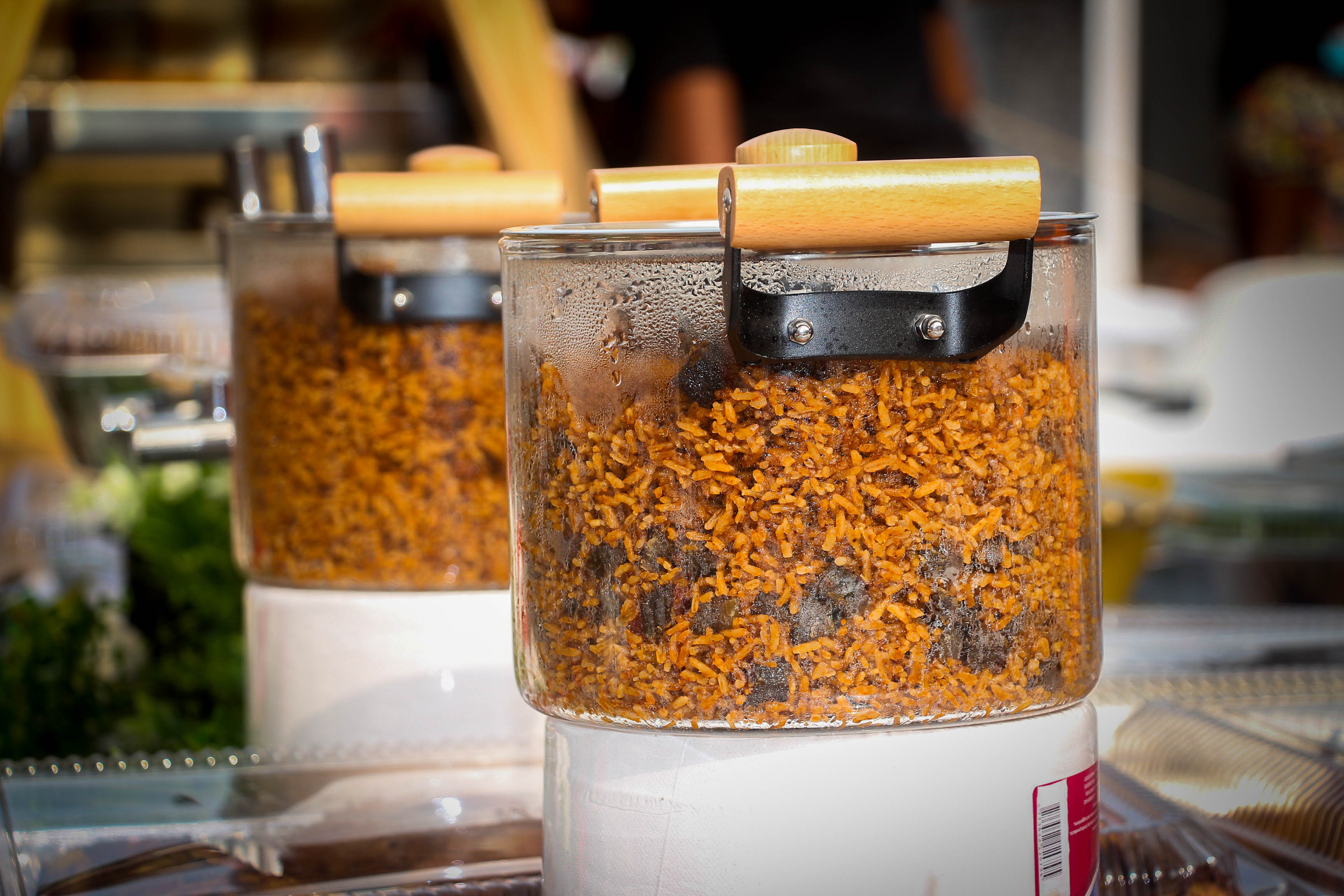
Ghanaian jollof rice

Ghanaian jollof rice is made of vegetable oil, onion, ginger, pressed garlic cloves, chillies, tomato paste, beef or goat meat or chicken (sometimes alternated with mixed vegetables), local or refined rice, typically jasmine rice and black pepper. Ghanaian jollof typically does not include any green leafy vegetables.

The method of cooking Ghanaian jollof begins with first preparing the beef or chicken by seasoning and steaming it with a pureé of ginger, onions and garlic and frying it until it is well-cooked. The rest of the ingredients are then fried all together, starting from onions, pepper, tomato paste, tomatoes and spices in that order. After all the ingredients have been fried, rice is then added and cooked until the meal is prepared. Ghanaian jollof is typically served with plantains and side dishes of beef, chicken, well-seasoned fried fish, or mixed vegetables.

Jollof in Ghana is often served alongside shito (a popular type of pepper sauce which originates from Ghana) and salad during parties and other ceremonies.

=== Liberia ===
Liberian jollof seldom includes seafood.

=== Nigeria ===
Although considerable variation exists, the basic profile for Nigerian jollof rice includes long-grain rice (including golden sella basmati rice), tomatoes puree and/or tomato paste, onions, pepper (scotch bonnets and/or habanero peppers; poblanos and/or bell peppers), vegetable oil, meat broth/stock and a various mixture of additional ingredients, including thyme, bay leaves, curry powder, white pepper, (small amounts of) nutmeg and stock cubes. Converted rice, which may respectively exist in the form of standard long-grain parboiled rice (often labelled as easy-cook rice in the U.K.) or Golden Sella basmati rice (similarly-parboiled and which has come to be especially commonly used in the U.K., gradually increasing in popularity since 2006) is most-appropriate for Nigerian one-pot rice-cooking, as it resists becoming mushy.

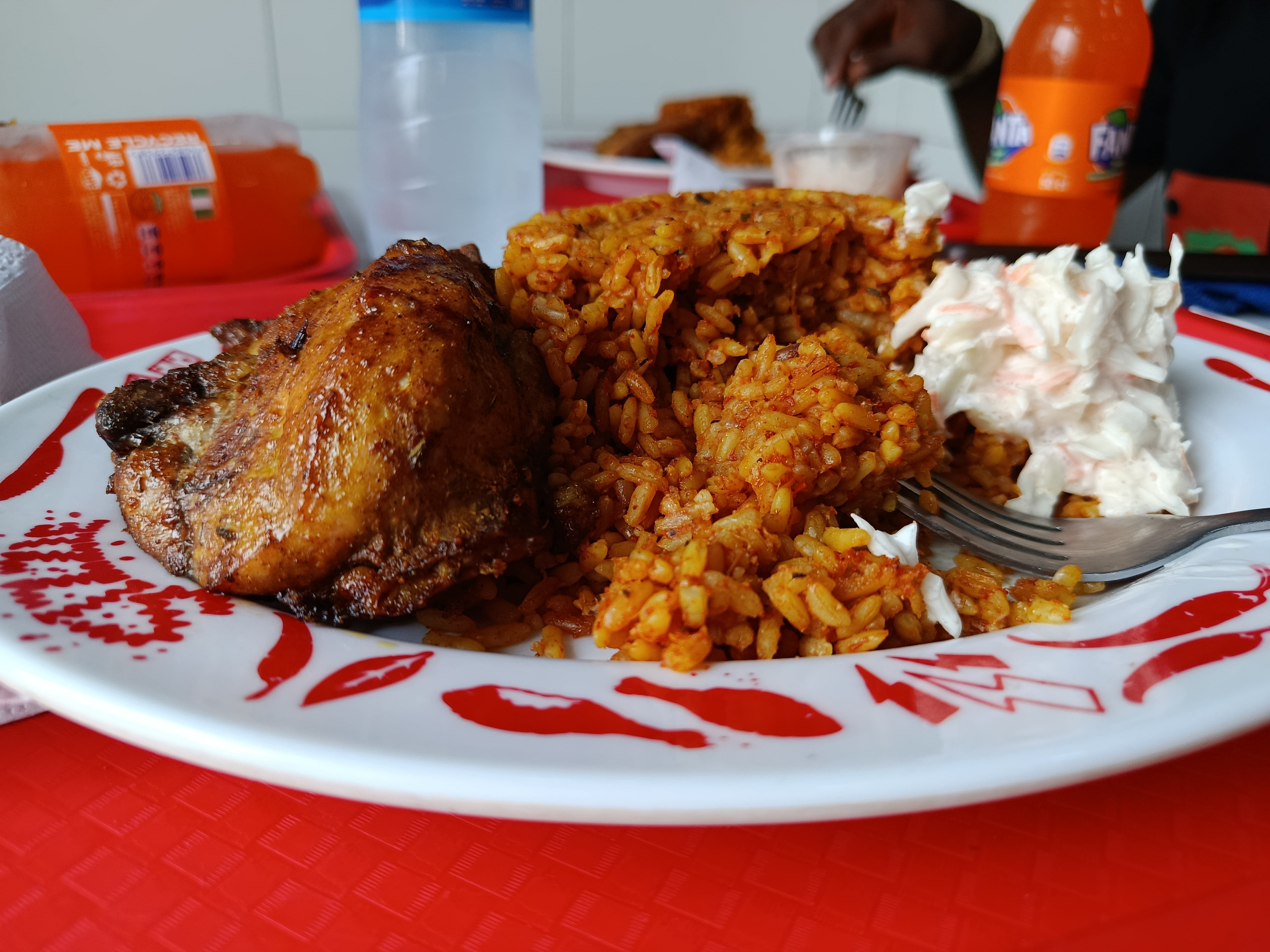
Nigerian jollof

The important quality of rice used to cook Nigerian one-pot rice recipes, including jollof rice, is that it is parboiled. The decision whether to use any of the numerous brands of conventional long-grain parboiled/easy-cook rice (e.g., Tolly Boy, Mama Gold, Dangote Rice, Veetee, Village Pride, Tropical Sun, Mama Pride, Mama Africa, Cap Rice, Uncle Ben's, Royal Stallion, Carolina Gold) or Golden Sella basmati-parboiled rice (further sub-branded, e.g., Asli, Tilda) is merely a matter of availability, convenience and/or personal preference and the sub-status of one or the other grain-group being conventional long-grain or basmati long-grain completely irrelevant. What matters is that it is parboiled (i.e., partially boiled at the husk when processing). Sella basmati rice, however, is considered more aesthetically pleasing to some.

Most of the ingredients are cooked in one pot, of which a rich meat stock or broth and a fried tomato and pepper puree characteristically forms the base. Rice is then added and left to cook in the liquid.

The dish is then served with the protein of choice (which in theory may be any meat but often beef, turkey, chicken or croaker-fish; much less commonly lamb, pork, etc.) and very often with fried plantains, moi-moi (bean pudding), steamed vegetables, coleslaw, salad, etc.

Several variations of prototypal Nigerian jollof rice exist, including coconut-jollof rice. Coconut-jollof rice is particularly often eaten by riverine and some Igbo Nigerians.

=== Senegal ===
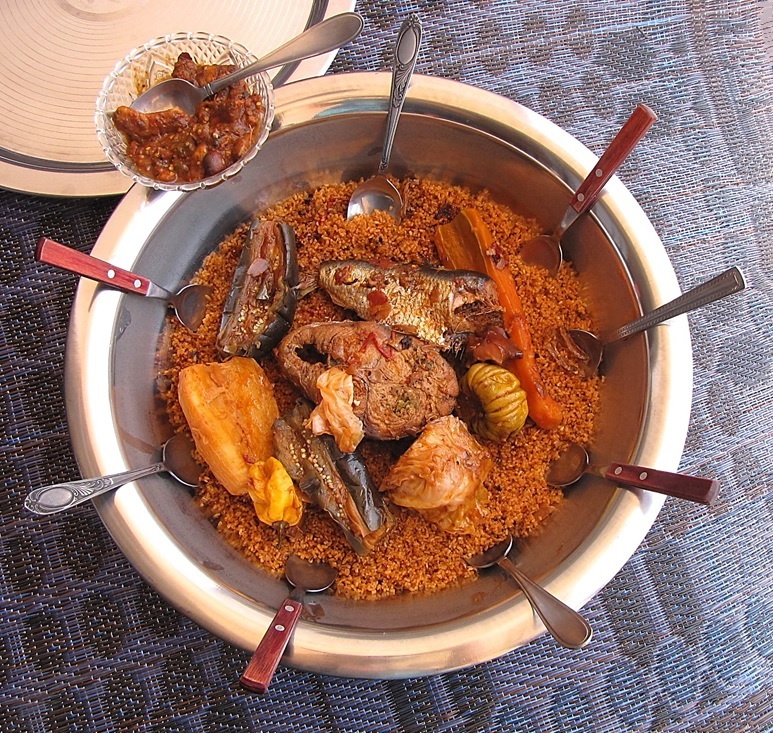
Senegalese thieboudienne

UNESCO recognized Senegal's version of jollof, thieboudienne, as an intangible cultural heritage dish. Thieboudienne typically uses broken rice. Smoked snails are a traditional ingredient.

=== Sierra Leone ===
The dish is known in Sierra Leone, where it may not call for red palm oil but instead tomato paste.

== Riz au gras ==
In French-speaking West Africa, including Beninese, Burkinabé, Guinean, Ivorian, Nigerien, and Togolese cuisines, there is a variant called riz gras or riz au gras, which translates to "fat rice", a reference to the short-grain rice usually used in the dish. This also exists in Guinea-Bissauan cuisine. Riz gras typically includes additional vegetables such as eggplant, carrots, and/or cabbage.

== Cultural importance and worldwide popularity ==
Jollof is culturally important in much of West Africa to the point there is a common saying, "A party without jollof is just a meeting". In Nigeria the phrase "see jollof" means "see how much fun is being had", according to Nigerian food historian Ozoz Sokoh.

Since the 2010s, there has been increasing interest in West African foods in the western world. Jollof food festivals have been held in Washington, DC, and Toronto. "World Jollof Day" has been celebrated since 2015 on 22 August, gaining traction on social media, and has helped increased the global recognition of jollof rice. On 3 November 2022, the dish was honoured with a Google Doodle.

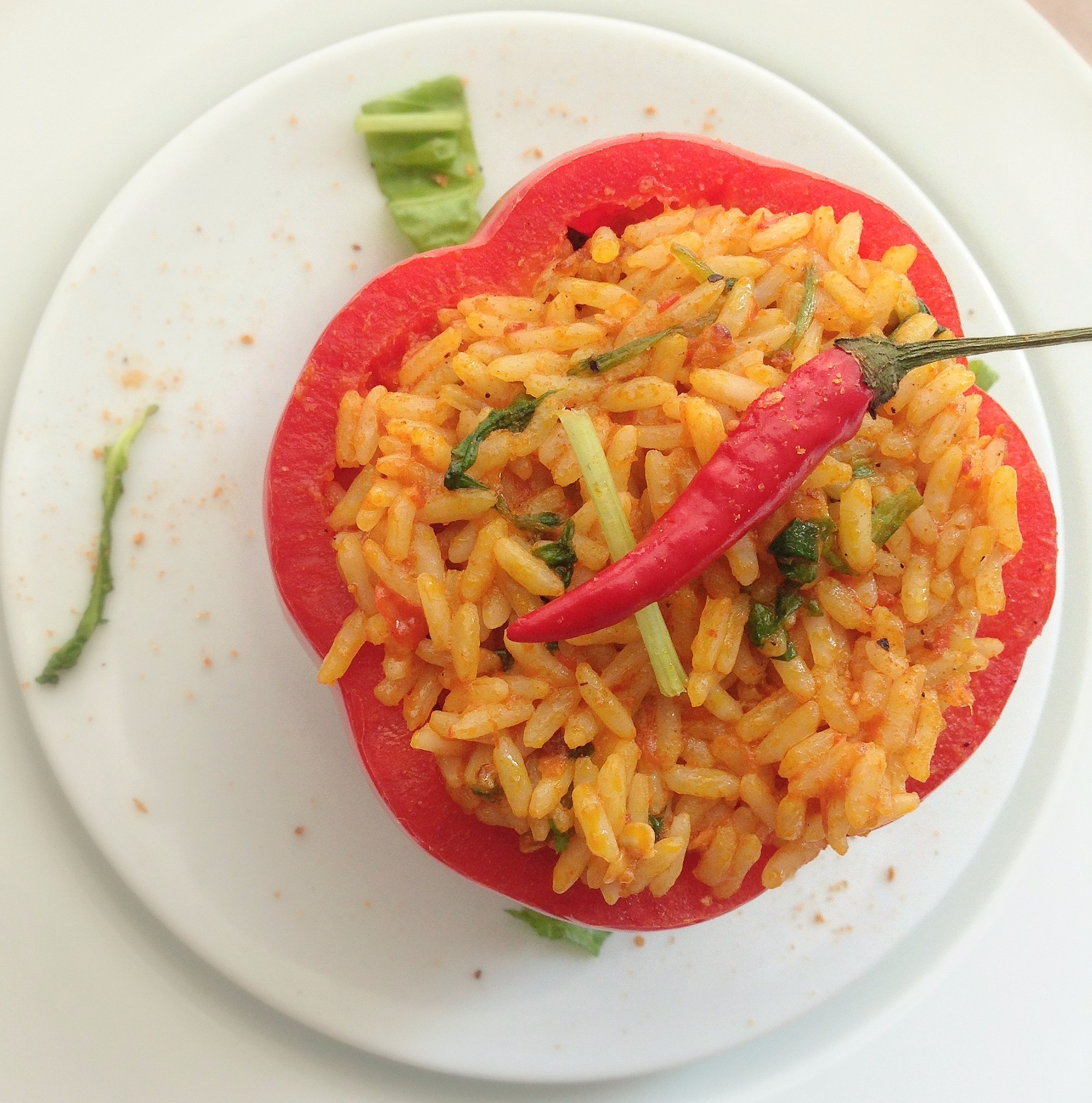
Native rice

== Related dishes ==
Some areas also have versions of two related dishes:

- Party jollof or party rice is traditionally cooked outdoors over a wood fire, which gives it a smoky flavor and a crusty "bottom pot" similar to tahdig or socarrat, it is prepared with fresh tomato and pepper mix, tomato paste, onions, vegetable oil, spices like thyme, rosemary, curry, meat stock, etc.
- Native rice, also called concoction rice, uses red palm oil and smoked, dried fish and is seasoned with locust beans (also known as iru or dawa-dawa), uziza seeds and/or scent leaf, (respectively known as nchuanwu, arimu and ahuji in Igbo; ntong in Efik-Ibibio; efirin in Yoruba, añyeba in Igala, aramogbo in Edo; etc.), occasionally sprinkled with cut olili (local mint). Concoction rice is a term that may refer to either this or an 'economically-friendly' version of either this or conventional jollof rice but in the latter, too, red palm oil (or groundnut oil) is more frequently used to cook it than vegetable oils.

== See also ==
- Arroz rojo
- Charleston red rice
- Jambalaya
- Java rice
- Biryani
- List of African dishes
- List of rice dishes
