= Cuisine of Niger =

Culinary traditions of Niger

Location of Niger

The cuisine of Niger draws on traditional African cuisines. Various spices are used and meals include grilled meat, seasonal vegetables, salads, and various sauces. Meals in Niger usually start with colorful salads made from seasonal vegetables. Moringa leaves are frequently used in salads.

Typical Nigerien meals consist of a starch (rice being the most common) paired with a sauce or stew. The starches eaten most often are millet and rice. Staple foods include millet, rice, cassava, sorghum, maize and beans. Couscous is saved for special occasions. Porridge, wheat dumplings, and beignets are some of Niger's most common snacks. One especially well-known food is jollof rice.

Plant agriculture production in Niger is significantly reliant upon rainfall to provide water for plants, and droughts have adversely affected Niger's agriculture production in the past, threatening the country's domestic food supply.

Tea is a common beverage in Niger.

== Spices ==
Some spices were brought to Niger by Arabian travelers, and include ginger, nutmeg, cinnamon, saffron, and cloves. Hot spices are also used in Nigerien cuisine. Sometimes spices are used to marinate meats to add flavor.

== Common dishes ==
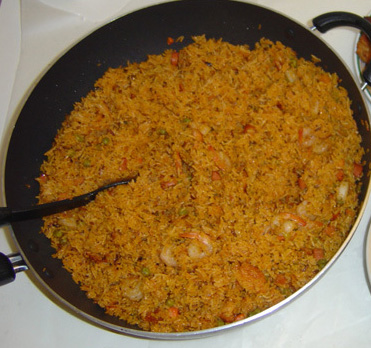
Jollof rice

- Jollof rice
- Dambou, dish made from cereals and moringa leaves
- Moringa, prepared with leaves of the "drumstick tree", the pods and flowers of which are also edible
- Stews and soups
- Millet porridge
- Palm nut soup

== Common foods ==
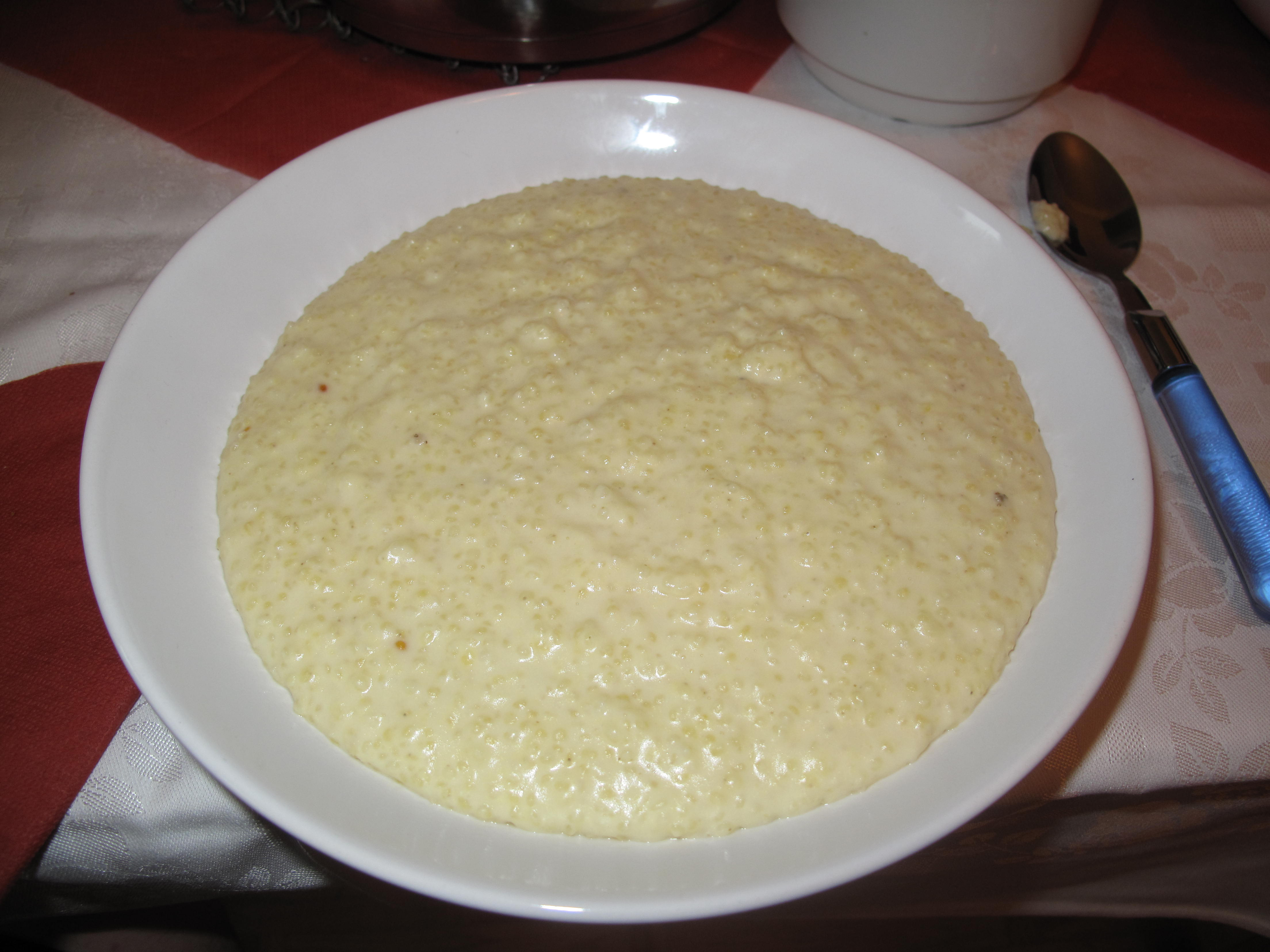
Millet porridge

- Beans
- Black-eyed peas
- Cassava root
- Chicken
- Chickpeas
- Dates
- Fish
- Goat
- Coarse grains

- Millet
- Sorghum

- Groundnuts
- Maize
- Mango
- Onion
- Beef
- Camel meat
- Guinea fowl
- Mutton
- Tiger nuts
- Fonio
- Rice
- Squash
- Cooked yams
- Yogurt
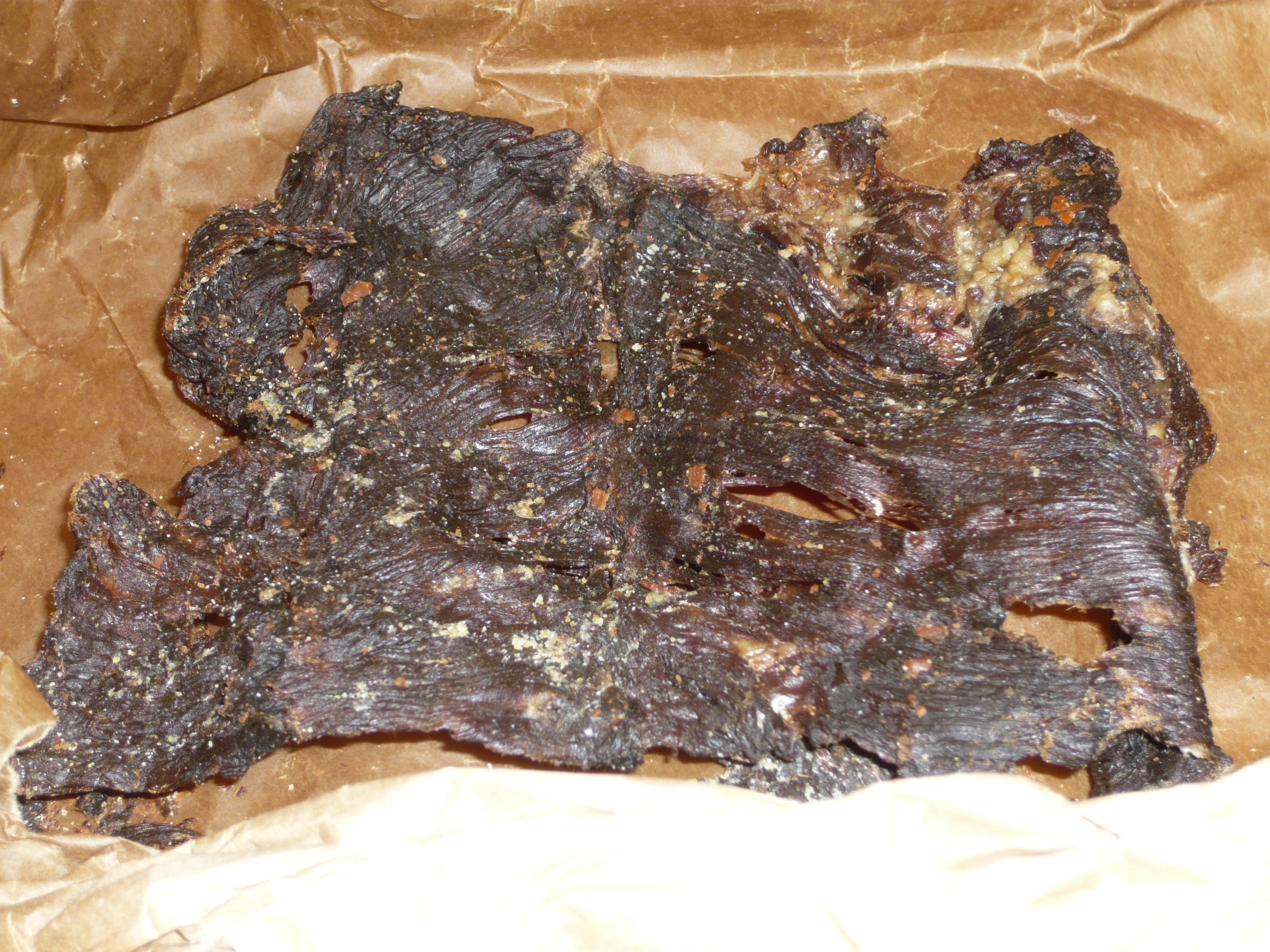
Kilishi in Niger

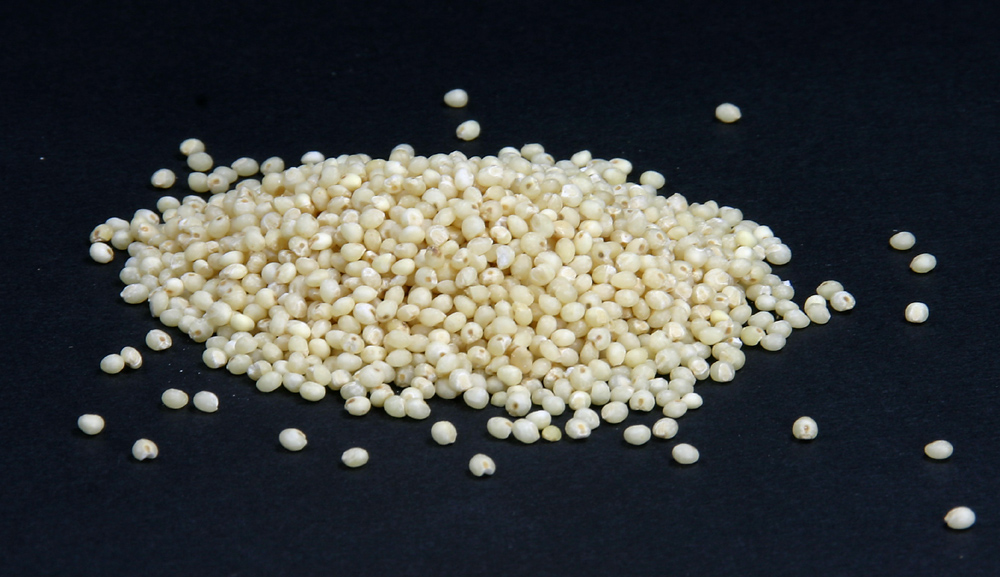
Millet grains

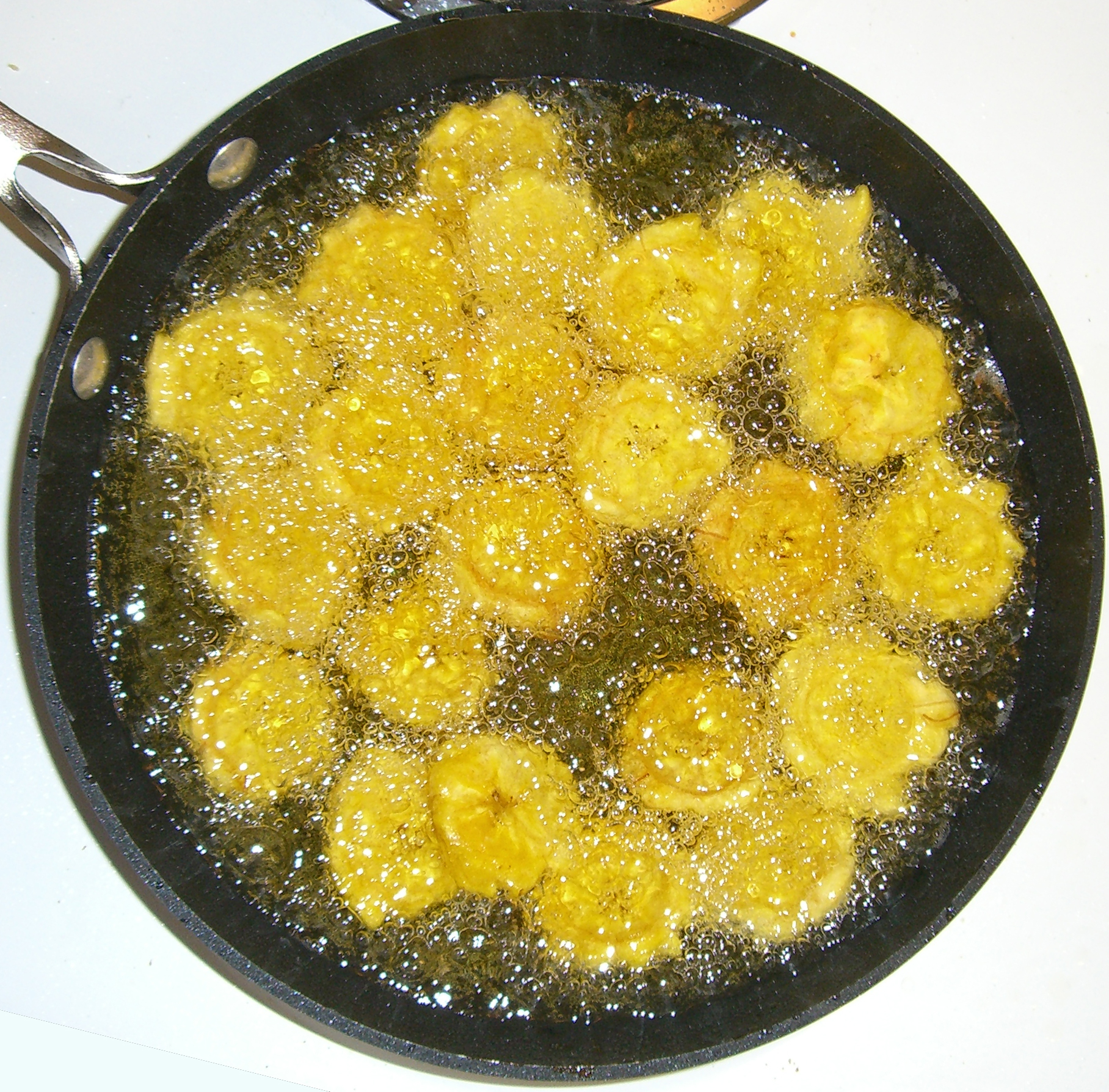
Fried plantain

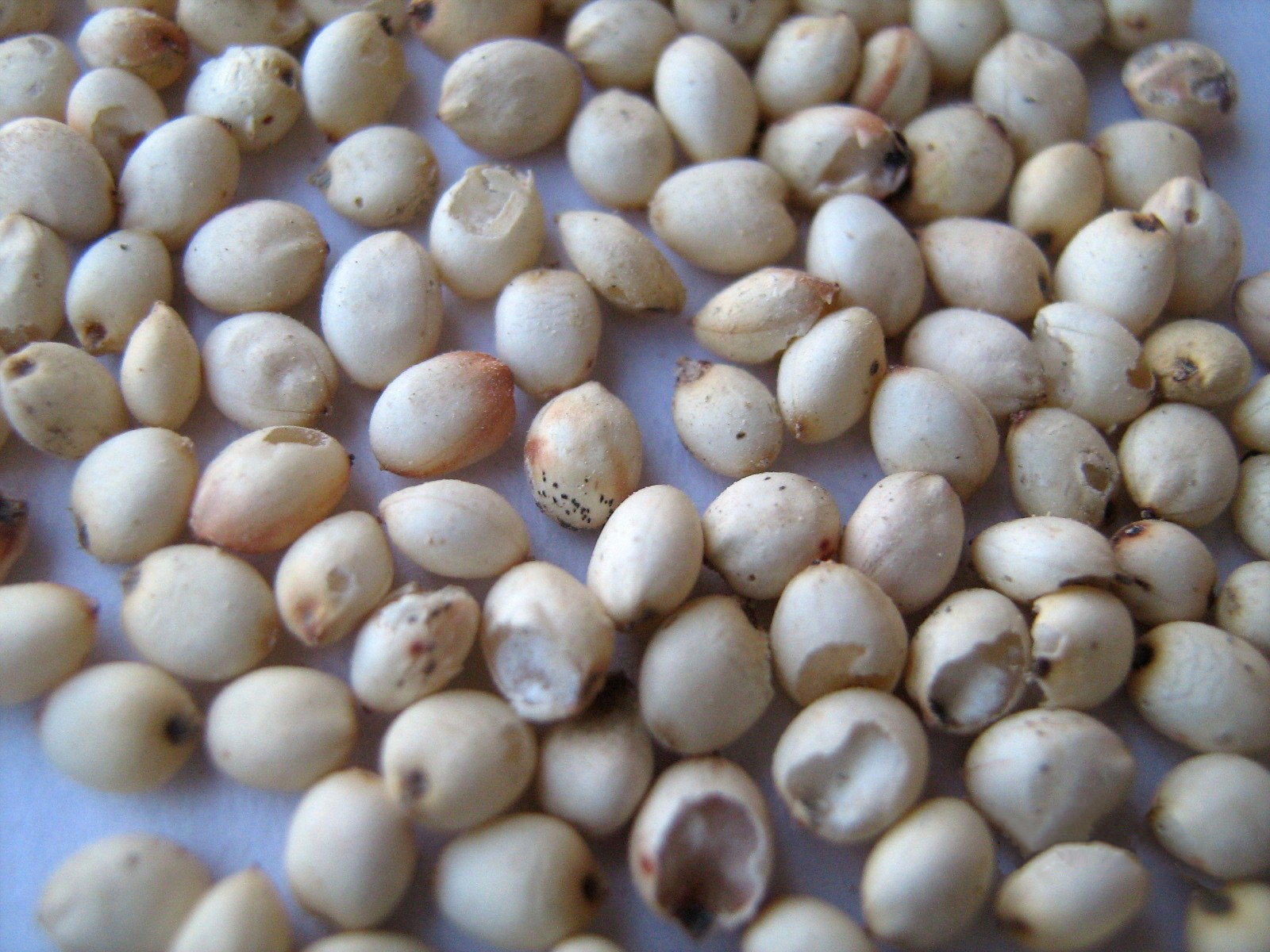
Sorghum grains

== See also ==
- African cuisine
- List of African dishes
