= Ewa aganyin =

Nigerian street food of beans and pepper sauce

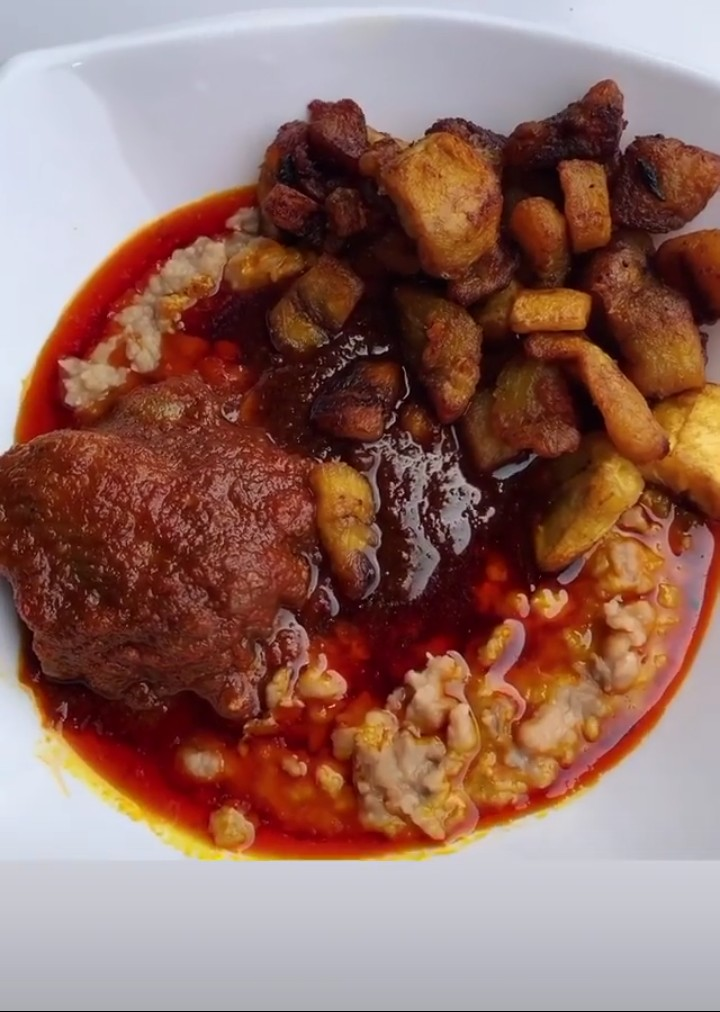
- Alternative names: Ewa agoyin
- Type: Beans dish
- Place of origin: Yorubaland
- Serving temperature: Hot
- Main ingredients: Black-eyed beans, palm oil, chili peppers, onions

Ewa aganyin (Yoruba) (also spelled as Ewa agoyin) is a Yoruba dish commonly eaten in Yorubaland across Togo, Nigeria and Benin. It is also popular as street food. The dish consists of beans cooked until extremely soft and then mashed. Other ingredients, such as bell peppers, onion, ginger, dried chilies, dried crayfish powder and palm oil, are added to form a stew. It is commonly eaten with bread, a popular combination in West Africa.

Ewa aganyin is similar to adalu, which is made with beans and corn.

== Overview ==
Ewa aganyin is a combination of mashed beans and its sauce typically served with Agege bread, a popular variety of bread that originated in Agege, Lagos State. It is a staple food across many Nigerian states, particularly as a breakfast meal, and its signature caramelized onion sauce is often credited for its sweet taste. While the dish is originally known as Ewa aganyin, it is sometimes mispronounced as Ewa agonyin.

Ewa aganyin is best known for its spicy, smoky, and rich flavor, making it a popular street food across Nigeria. When prepared appropriately, it can also be a nutritious meal. Beans are a good source of protein and dietary fiber, while palm oil contains antioxidants. The dish is also naturally gluten-free and plant-based.

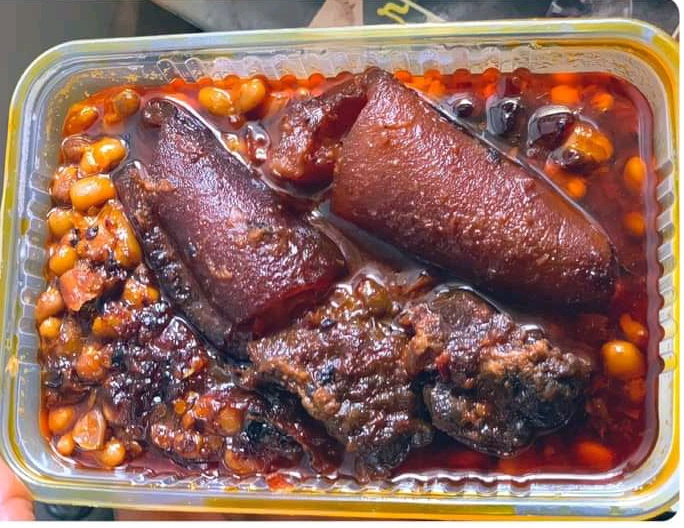
Ewa Agoyin

== See also ==
- List of street foods
