= Concoction rice =

Nigerian food

Concoction rice is a home-made food in Nigeria prepared instead of jollof rice or conventional white rice. The major ingredients used in making the food include rice, vegetable oil and salt. It is referred to as concoction rice since vegetable oil is replaced by palm oil.

== Overview ==
Other ingredients used in making concoction rice include scent leaf, curry leaf, locust bean, pepper, seasoning cubes and onion. Concoction rice is done when water in the rice dries up.
