= Liberian cuisine =

Cultural aspect of Liberia

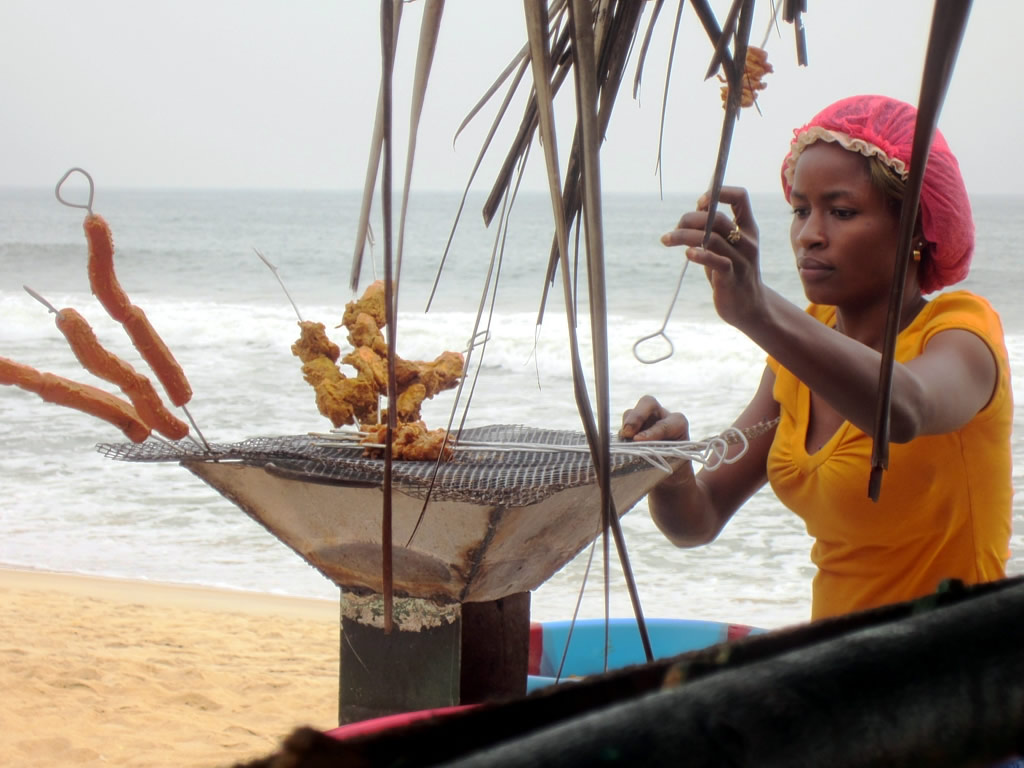
A beachside barbeque at Sinkor, Monrovia, Liberia

Location of Liberia

Liberian cuisine refers to the cuisine of Liberia. It is centered on rice, cassava, plantain, yam, tropical fruits and vegetables (potatoes, greens, cassava leaf, okra, cabbage), as well as fish and meat. Liberian cuisine is also influenced by African Americans through Americo-Liberians and Caribbean food and recipes.

Liberia also has a tradition of baking, including cornbread, sour bread, rice bread, banana bread, and cakes.

== Dietary staples ==
=== Starches ===
Rice is a staple of the Liberia diet, whether commercial or country ("swamp rice" or Bulgur wheat (popularized during the wars)), and either served "dry" (without a sauce (dry rice is often served with chicken, luncheon meat, or corned beef)), with stew or soup poured over it, cooked into the classic jollof rice, or ground into a flour to make "country breh" (bread). The cassava or tapioca root is processed and pounded into starchy foods such as fufu (using dried cassava) and dumboy (using boiled cassava). Fufu can also be made with Plantains or Taro root. One especially popular pounded cassava dish is the northeastern regional variant glea-gbar, colloquially known as GB or geebee and generally served with a spicy mixed-meat soup. Eddoes (taro roots) are also eaten.

=== Fruits and vegetables ===
Popular Liberian ingredients include cassava, bananas, citrus fruit, sweet and regular plantains, coconut, okra and sweet potatoes. Heavy stews spiced with habanero and Scotch bonnet chillies are popular and eaten with fufu. Potato greens, the leafy plant of the sweet potato, are widely grown and consumed, as is bitterball (a small vegetable similar to eggplant), and okra.

Other popular stews, referred to as "soups", are toborghee, bitterleaf, collard greens, potato greens, palm butter, peanut soup, pepper soup (eaten with fufu or rice), cassava leaf and palava sauce. Toborghee consists of African eggplants which are stewed and spiced with fermented palm oil. It is often bitter in taste and typically associated with the Lorma people inhabiting the area of Lofa.

Bitterleaf, referred to as "bittas" by the Sierra Leoneans, consists of bitter leaves mixed with ground melon seeds.

Cassava leaf, referred to as "gbassajama", is made from ground cassava leaves. The leaves are then braised and tenderized in a broth and mixed together with red palm oil stock.

Palava sauce consists of jute leaves, also referred to as "plateau", that are stewed in a broth.

=== Fish and meat ===
Fish is one of the key animal protein sources in Liberia, with a 1997 study noting that in the Upper Guinea countries (of which Liberia is one), fish made up 30–80% of animal proteins in the diet. However, studies have noted that in that region, consumption of fish actually declined from the 1970s to the 1990s due to "land and catchments degradation". Small dried fishes are known as bodies or bonnies.

==== Bushmeat ====
Bushmeat is widely eaten in Liberia, and is considered a delicacy. A 2004 public opinion survey found that bushmeat ranked second behind fish amongst Monrovians as a preferred source of protein. Of households where bushmeat was served, 80% of residents said they cooked it "once in a while", while 13% cooked it once a week and 7% cooked bushmeat daily. The survey was conducted during the last civil war, and bushmeat consumption is now believed to be far higher.

Endangered species are hunted for human consumption in Liberia. Species hunted for food in Liberia include elephants, pygmy hippopotamus, chimpanzees, leopards, duikers, and various types of monkeys.

=== Alcohol ===
While Liberia produces, imports, and consumes some standard beers and liquors, the traditional palm wine made from fermenting palm tree sap is popular. Palm wine can be drunk as is, used as a yeast substitute in bread, or used as vinegar after it has soured. A local rum is also made from sugarcane, and called "cane juice" or gana gana.
