= Burkinabe cuisine =

Culinary traditions of Burkina Faso

Burkinabe cuisine, the cuisine of Burkina Faso, is similar to the cuisines in many parts of West Africa, and is based on staple foods of sorghum, millet, rice, fonio, maize, peanuts, potatoes, beans, yams and okra. Rice, maize and millet are the most commonly eaten grains. Grilled meat is common, particularly mutton, goat, beef and fish.

Vegetables include yams and potatoes, okra, tomatoes, zucchini, carrots, leeks, onions, beets, pumpkins, cucumbers, cabbage, sorrel and spinach.

Although imported products are becoming more common in urban areas, meals in more rural areas typically consist of tô, a sauce of corchorus or baobab leaves, as well as the calyx from Bombax costatum, dried fish, and spices such as chili and soumbala.

Babies are often fed porridge, especially between six and twelve months old, until they begin eating the same foods as older children. Porridge remains a popular food after infancy as well.

== Common dishes ==
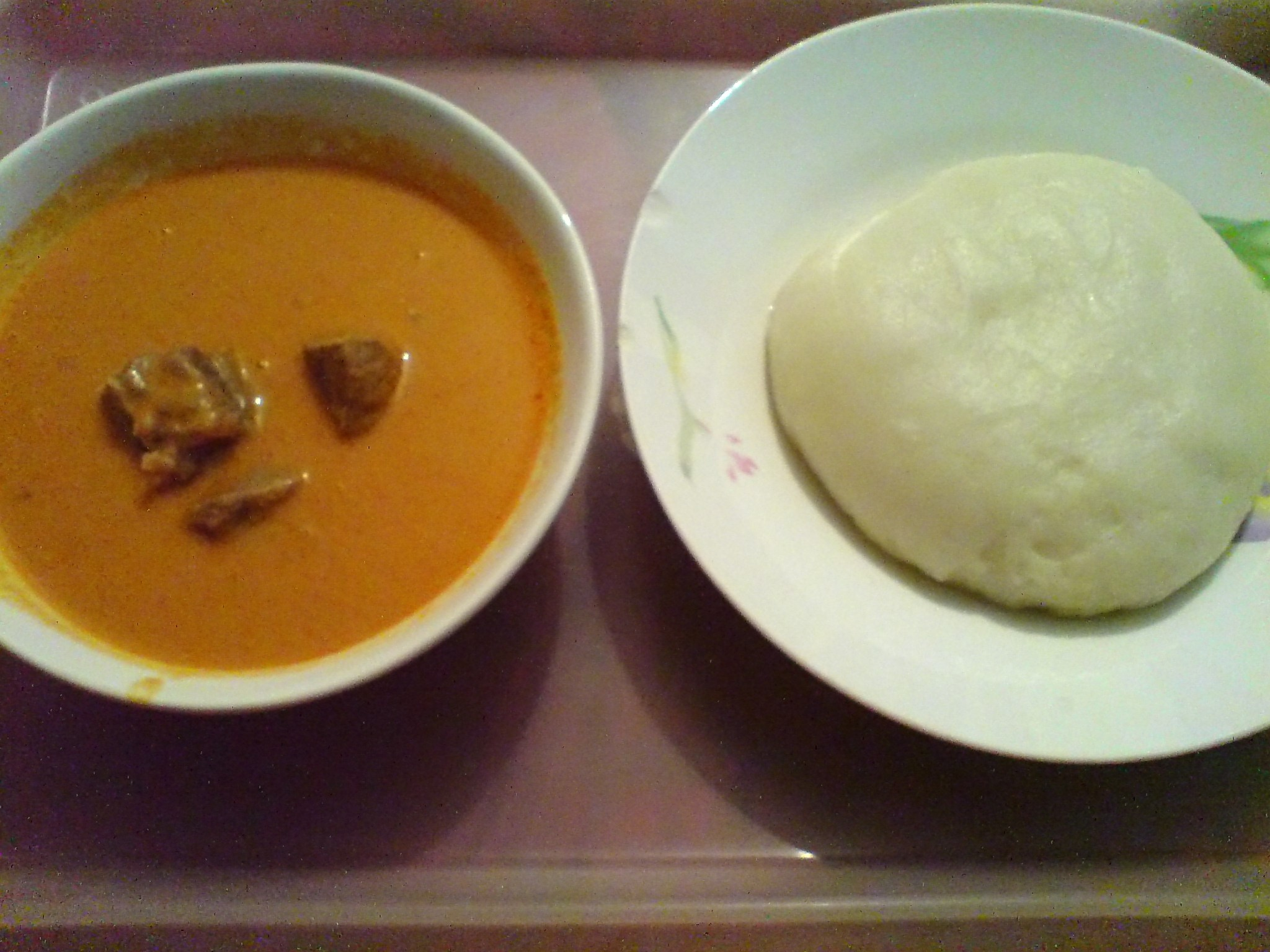
A plate of foufou (right) accompanied with peanut soup

Location of Burkina Faso

- Tô (saghbo in Mooré), cooled polenta-style cakes made from ground millet, sorghum or corn. Tô is served with a sauce made from vegetables such as tomatoes, peppers, sumbala and carrots, sometimes supplemented by a piece of meat like mutton or goat. Eaten by hand, this traditional dish is the staple of the Burkinabe diet.
- Foufou
- Poulet bicyclette, a grilled chicken dish common across West Africa.
- Ragout d'Igname, a yam stew dish native to Burkina Faso
- Riz gras, rice cooked with onions, tomatoes and meat.
- Sauce gombo, a sauce made with okra
- Brochettes
- Poulet braisé, grilled chicken very popular in the city; almost all restaurants and bars offer this dish.
- Babenda, a Mossi stew traditionally made with millet, wild greens and potash, but now modernized to include a variety of ingredients, such as tomatoes, fermented beans, fish, cabbage, and/or spinach.

Restaurants generally serve Burkinabe dishes alongside those of neighbouring countries. Foreign dishes include a fish or meat stew called kédjénou from Côte d'Ivoire and poulet yassa, a chicken stew with lemon and onions, from Senegal.

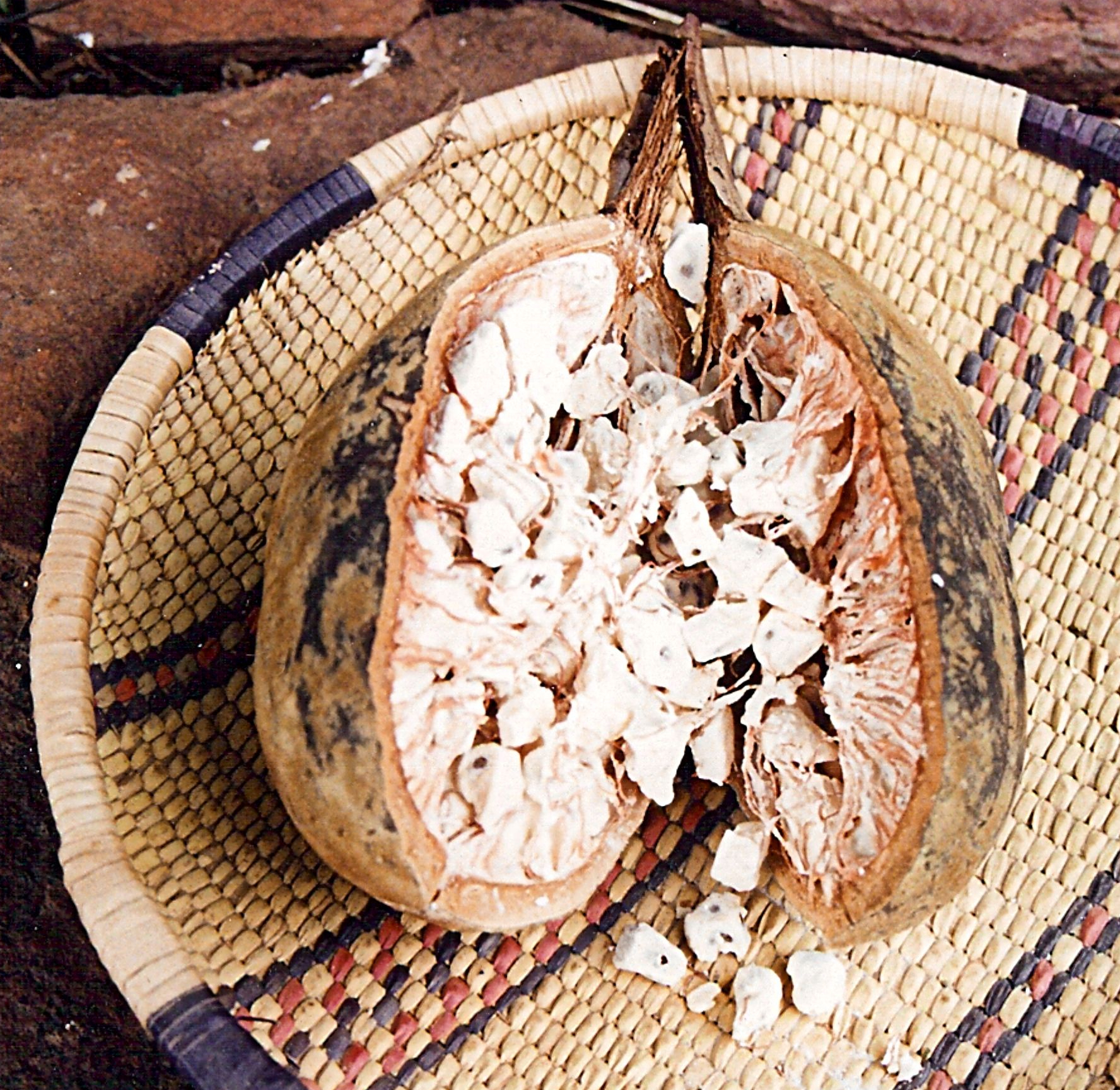
The fruit of the baobab tree

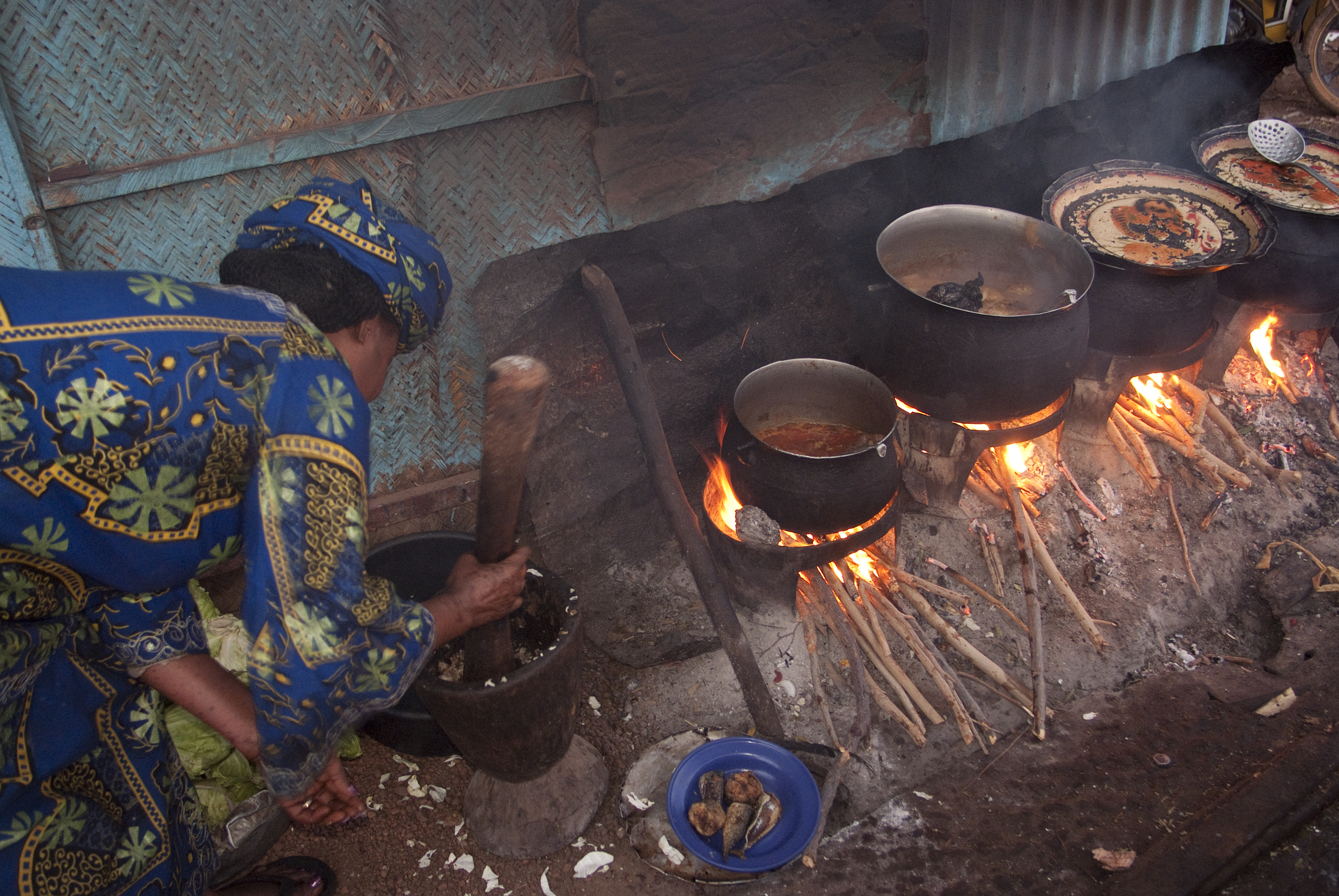
Foods being cooked in Burkina Faso

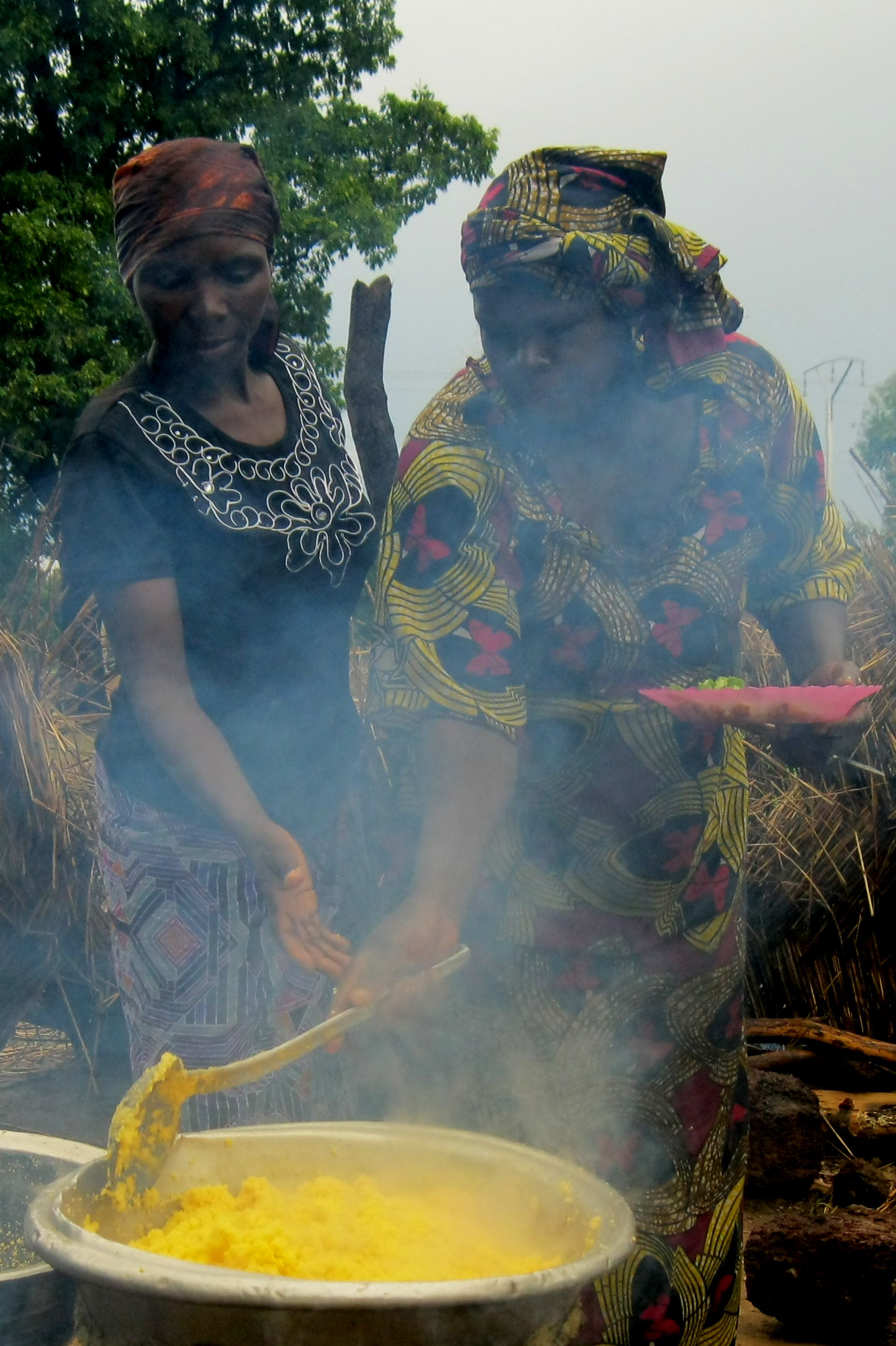
Preparing tô

== Common beverages ==
- Bissap/Bisap, a sour-tasting drink made from Roselle (Bissap) flowers in the Hibiscus family, sweetened with sugar
- Dôlo, a beer made from pearl millet or sorghum
- Tédo (or teedo), baobab fruit juice
- Yamaccu or Yammaccudji, beverage made of ginger
- Zomekome, a soft drink made from millet flour, ginger, lemon juice and tamarind
- Tamarind juice
- Jus de Weda or Jus de Liane
- Thiakry, (also known as dèguè) a sweet pudding/beverage made with millet mixed in milk or yogurt, often with dried fruit and spices added

== See also ==
- Togolese cuisine
- List of African cuisines
