= Charleston red rice =

Rice dish from South Carolina and Georgia, US

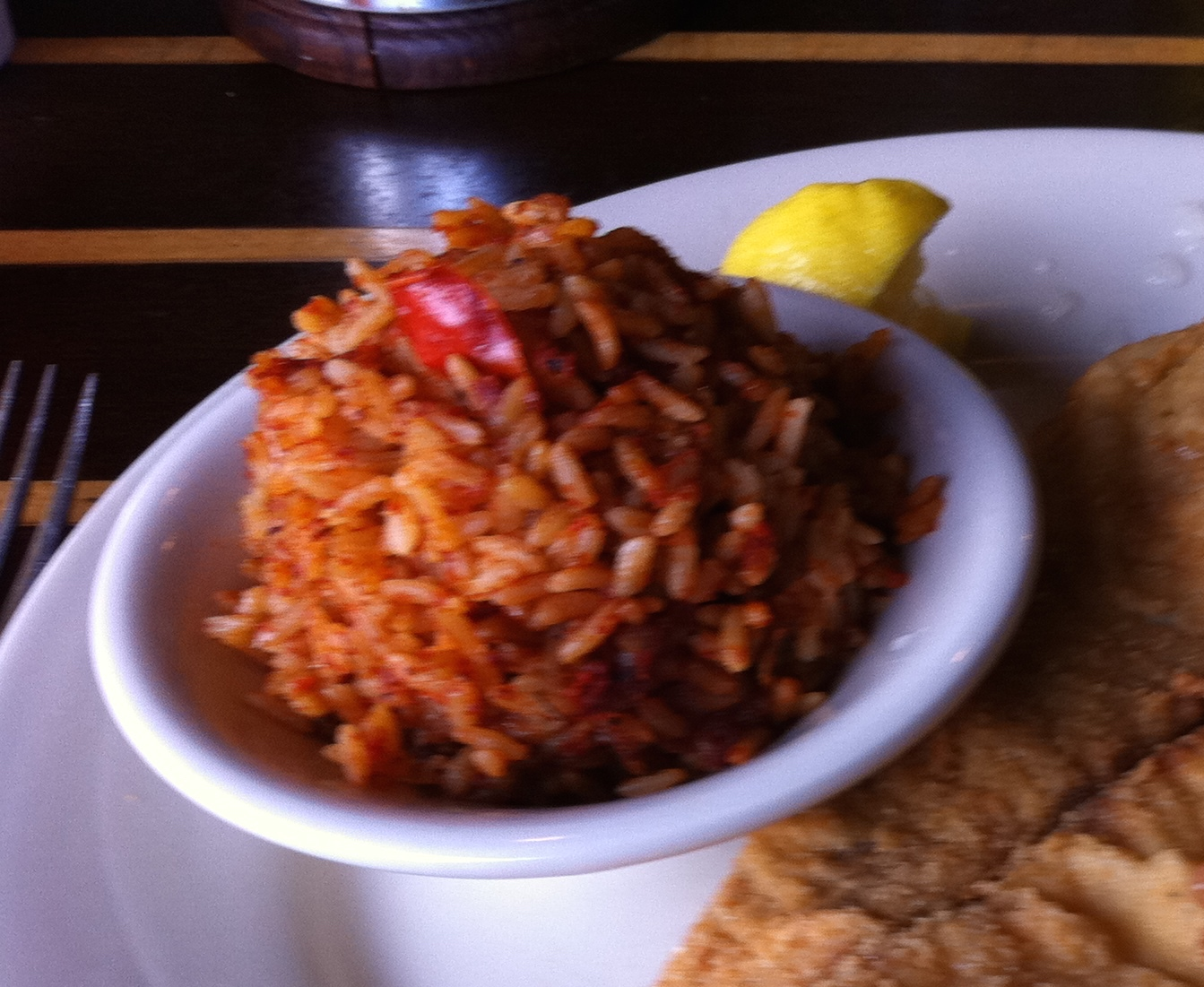
- Alternative names: Red rice
- Type: Rice
- Region or state: Southeast United States
- Associated cuisine: Lowcountry
- Main ingredients: White rice
- Ingredients generally used: Crushed tomatoes, bacon or sausage, celery, bell peppers, onions
- Food energy (per 3 oz serving): 166 kcal (690 kJ)
Nutritional value
(per 3 oz serving)
- Protein: 3 g
- Fat: 3.2 g
- Carbohydrate: 30.7 g
- Similar dishes: Thieboudienne, jollof rice

Charleston red rice is a rice dish commonly found along the Southeastern coastal regions of Georgia and South Carolina, known simply as red rice by natives of the region.

This traditional meal was brought to the U.S. by enslaved Africans from West Africa. This cultural foodway is almost always synonymous with the Gullah or Geechee people and heritage that are still prevalent throughout the coastal regions of South Carolina and Georgia. The main component of the dish consists of the cooking of white rice with crushed tomatoes instead of water and small bits of bacon or smoked pork sausage. Celery, bell peppers, and onions are the traditional vegetables used for seasoning.

The dish bears a resemblance to African dishes, particularly the Senegambian dish thieboudienne, suggesting a creolization of the dish from West Africa to the New World. It also bears a resemblance to jollof rice.

== See also ==
- List of regional dishes of the United States
