= Adalu (food) =

Popular Nigeria dish

- Region or state: Yorubaland
- Main ingredients: Maize, beans

Adalu is a Yoruba corn and beans porridge, native and popular in Nigeria, Benin and Togo in Yorubaland region.

== Ingredients ==
- Beans (black-eyed peas or brown beans)
- Corn
- Palm oil
- Onions
- Scotch bonnet pepper
- Seasoning cubes
- Salt
- Garlic (optional)
- Ginger (optional)
- Vegetables

== Equipment ==
- Cooking Gas
- Pot

== Preparation ==
Corn and beans are boiled separately before being combined. Palm oil, onion, pepper and salt are then added to taste.

Adalu is often served with plantain and smoked fish.

== See also ==
- Nigerian cuisine
- Sweet corn
- Ewa aganyin, another Nigerian bean dish
