= Zoomkoom =

Fermented beverage

Zoomkoom is a fermented beverage from Burkina Faso and Northern Ghana with a sweet taste.

"Zoom" means flour and “koom” means water in the Mooré language. It is also known as "Zonkuon" in the Dagara language, where "zon" means flour and "kuon" means water, similar to that of the Mooré language. There are varieties of zoomkoom, the traditional and modernized one. The traditional beverage is brown in color and the modernized has a white appearance because millet is used in place of guinea corn and without shea butter.

== Ingredients ==
- Ginger
- Grains of Selim
- Cloves
- Black peppercorn|Pepper
- Guinea pepper/Grains of Paradise
- Dried red chilli peppers (according to desired heat/spiciness)
- Shea butter (optional)
- Sweetener of choice (Optional, .e. honey, dates, sugar, stevia, etc.)
- Milled pearl millet/ guinea corn

== Method of preparation ==
Peeled tamarinds are soaked in water, and then boiled and sugar is added. Millet flour, chilli pepper and ginger are then added, and the mixture is stirred to a smooth consistency. The drink is served cold.

== Uses ==
- “Zoomkoom” is a welcome-to-my-house drink and is usually offered to guests.
- Traditional ceremonies
