= Thieboudienne =

Traditional dish from Senegal

Tiep
- Alternative names: Benechin, ceebu jën
- Type: Main dish
- Place of origin: Saint-Louis, Senegal
- Cooking time
- Main ingredients: Fish and rice
- Ingredients generally used: Vegetables
- Variations: Meat
- Similar dishes: Jollof rice

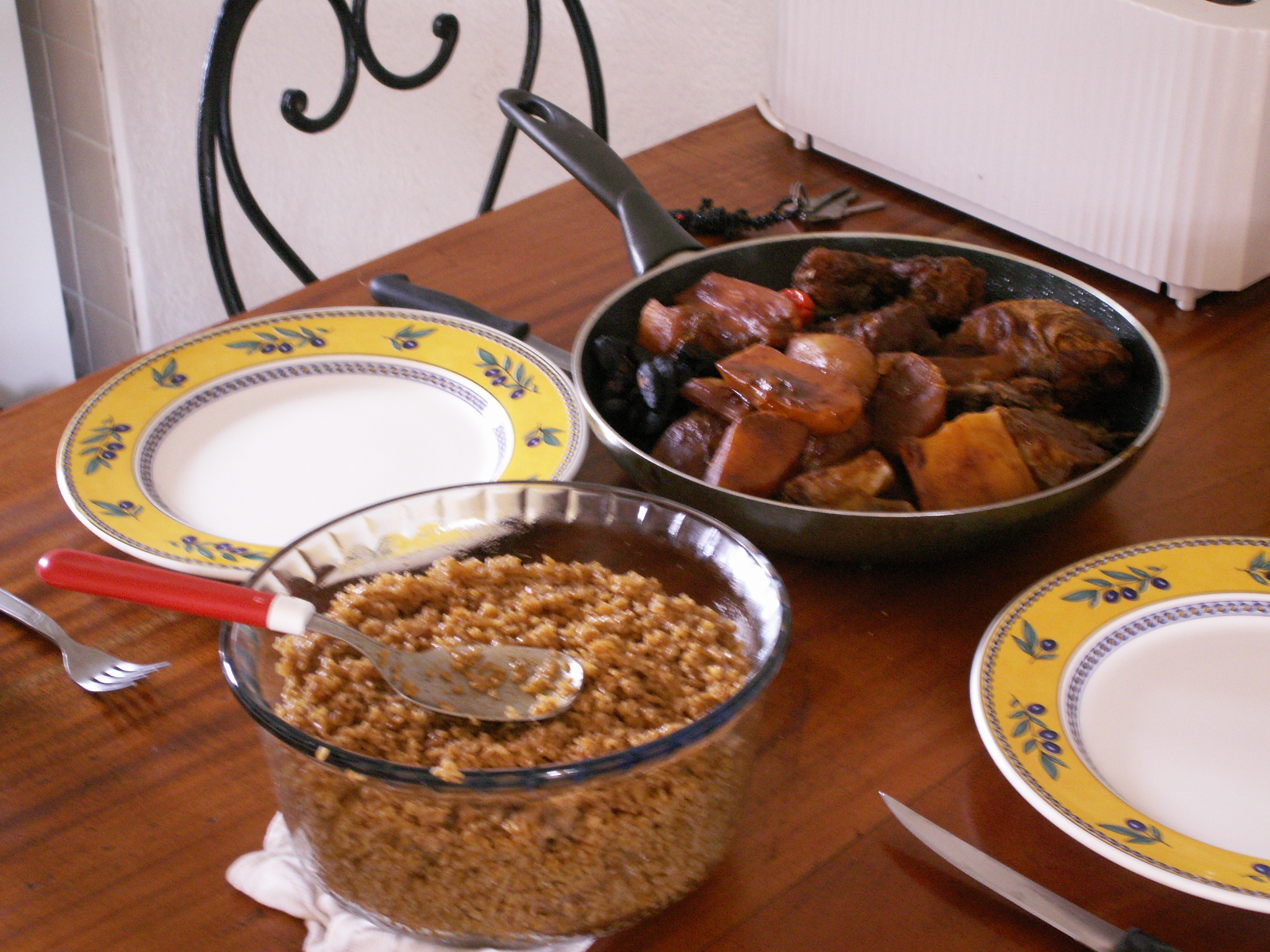
Thieboudienne

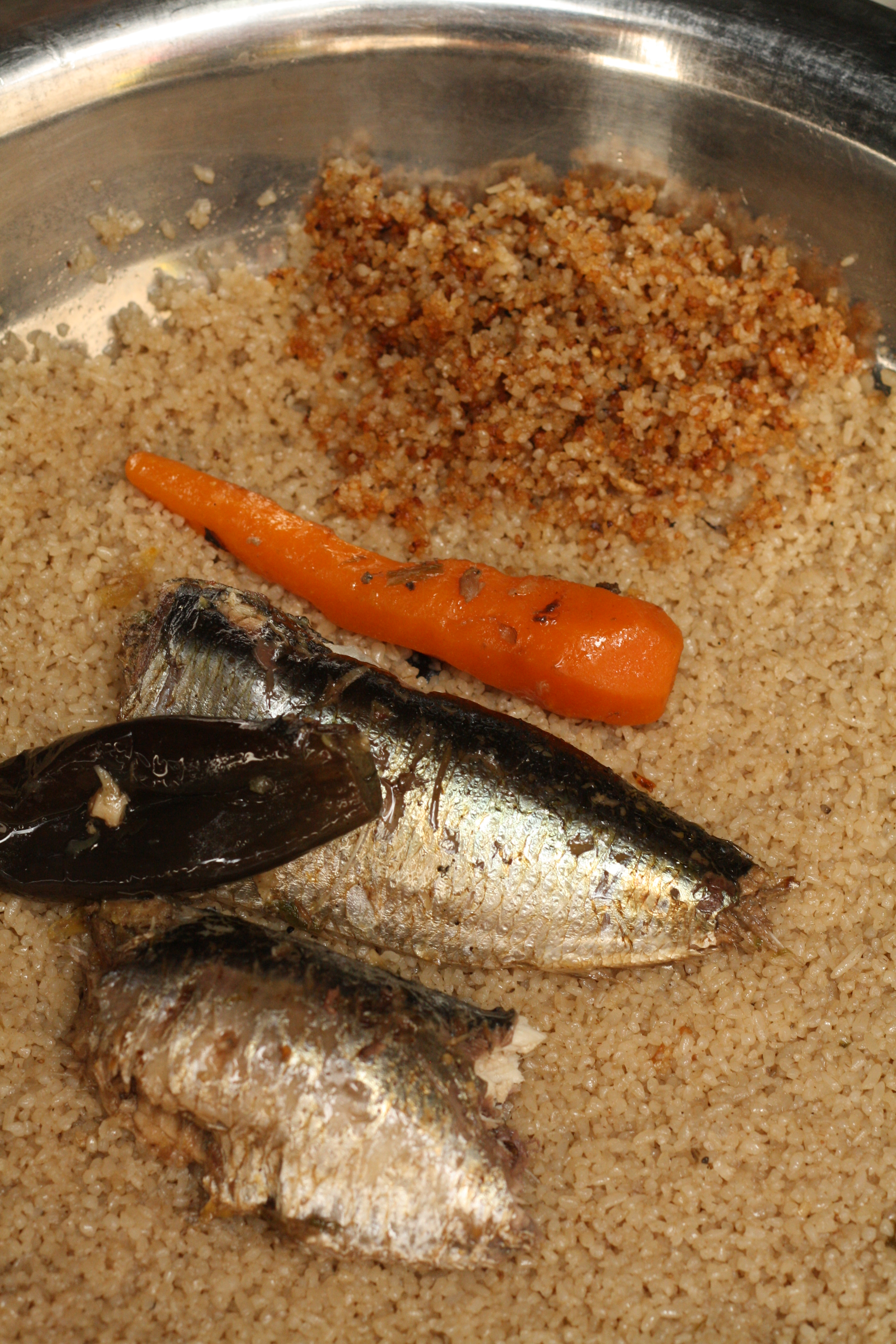

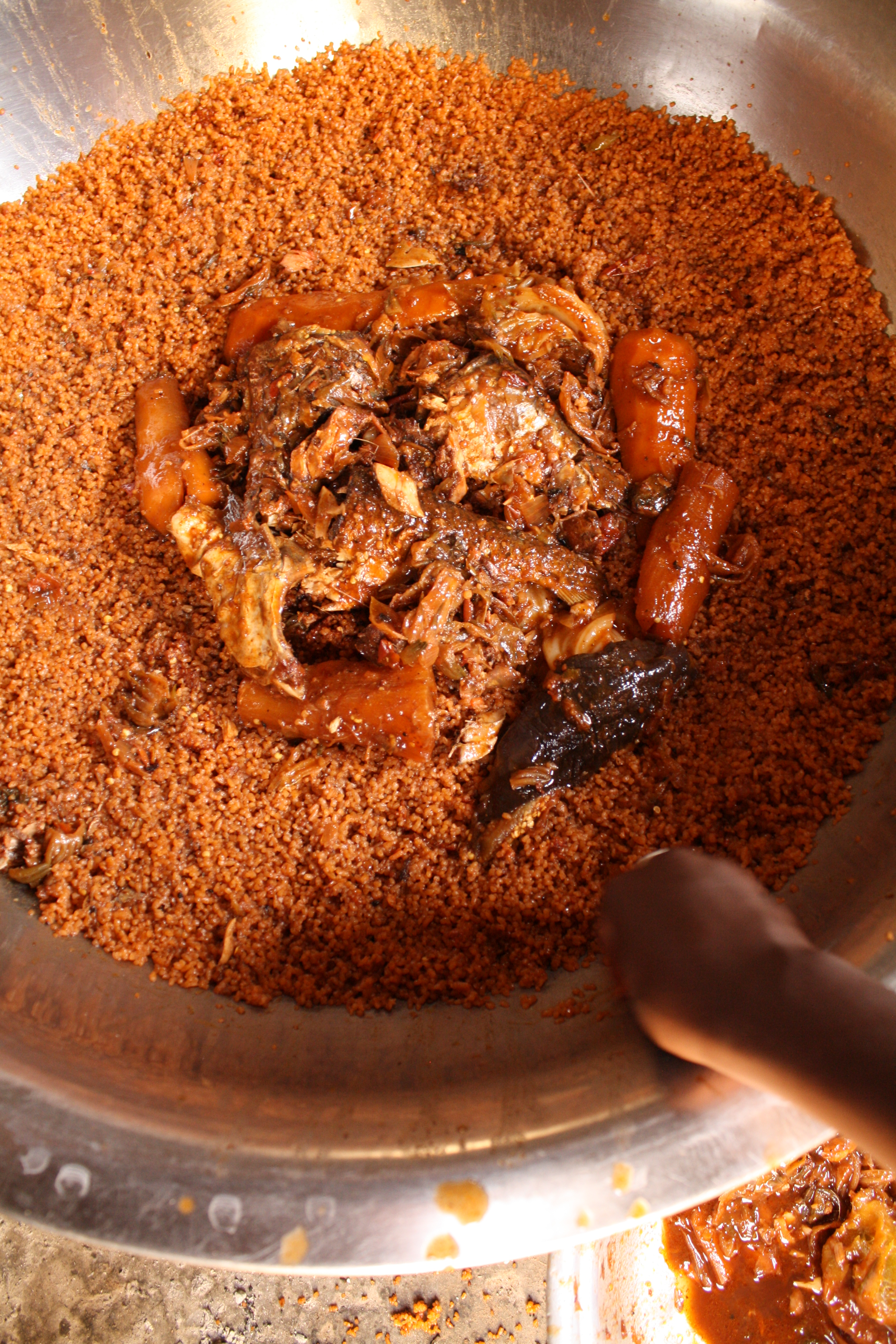

Ceeb or tiep (alternatively thieb), also known as benechin (or benachin) or jollof rice, is the national dish of Senegal, also consumed in Mauritania, Guinea-Bissau, Guinea, Mali, The Gambia, and other West and Central African countries. The version of tiep called ceebu jën (Wolof pronunciation: [ˈcɛːbu ˈɟən]), chebu jen, or Francized as thieboudienne (French: thiéboudiène), is prepared with fish, broken rice and tomato sauce cooked in one pot. There are also tiep yappa (with meat) and tiep ganaar (with chicken) varieties. Additional ingredients often include onions, tomatoes, carrots, cabbage, cassava, hot pepper, lime and peanut oil, and stock cubes.

== Name ==
The name of the dish comes from the Wolof words ceeb (meaning 'rice') and jën ('fish'). In Pulaar it is known as maaro e liddi ('rice and fish'). The Wolof name has been loaned into Hassaniya Arabic, but the dish is also referred to by the calque مارو والحوت (māru w-əl-ḥūt).

=== Other renderings ===
Other renderings of the name include: ceebu jen, cee bu jen, ceeb u jen, thebouidienne, theibou dienn, thiebou dienn, thiebou dinne, thiébou dieune, tíe biou dienne, thieb-ou-djien, thiebu djen or riz au poisson.

== History ==
Historically, tiep is commonly attributed to the city of Saint-Louis, in the nineteenth century. The collapse of white grouper fisheries has reduced access to the dish.

== Serving ==
Traditionally it is eaten in a large communal dish with the hand. It is also the symbol of Senegalese terranga (hospitality): family, visiting friends and guests gather around a single dish (called a bolus) from which everyone eats using a spoon (couddou Pulaar) or their hand. It is served on large trays with the rice on the bottom and the fish, usually white grouper (Epinephelus aeneus), and the vegetables, many of them whole, placed in the center.

== Related dishes ==
The popular West African dish known as jollof is thought to have originated from thieboudienne, but is usually made with meat rather than fish, and the rice is mixed into the other ingredients.

The Gullah dish red rice resembles thieboudienne, suggesting a creolization of foodways from West Africa in the New World by enslaved Africans and their descendants. Like thieboudienne, there are regional variations of red rice throughout the Gullah/Geechee Cultural Heritage Corridor, including Savannah red rice and Charleston red rice.

== Recipe ==
It is a preparation of fresh or dried fish, and broken rice (rice Wolof), cooked with vegetables (such as cassava, pumpkin, cabbage, carrot, turnip, or eggplant), parsley, tomato paste, peppers, garlic and onions. Originally made with fish, it is not unusual to see it served with beef or chicken.

== Variations ==
=== By country ===
Originally from Senegal, the traditional recipe includes fish, rice, tomato and onions. Thieboudienne is sometimes called benechin in Senegal which means 'one pot' in Wolof. However, tiep is commonly consumed in several countries in West Africa. Depending on the country, the recipe and the ingredients change—even the method of cooking can differ. In Mali, tiep is known as tieb, a dish consisting of chicken, rice and vegetables such as a tomato and onion base. Jollof rice which derived from tiep is a popular dish especially in Nigeria and Ghana. In Cameroon, Guinea and Ivory Coast the dish is called riz gras. The components are similar to the original recipe's ingredients with the inclusion of tomatoes, rice and onions.

=== By ethnicity ===
Senegal's distinctive ethnic groups have their own variations on cuisine and eating habits, influenced either by proximity to the ocean or the traditions of nomadism and cattle raising. For instance, people from southern Senegal usually also add some bissap while people from Dakar and Saint-Louis will use some soul (Wolof). The dish is considered an intangible cultural heritage of humanity.

== See also ==
- Couscous
- Cuisine of Senegal
- Paprykarz szczeciński
- List of stews
- List of African dishes
