= Agege bread =

Nigerian bread

Agege Bread
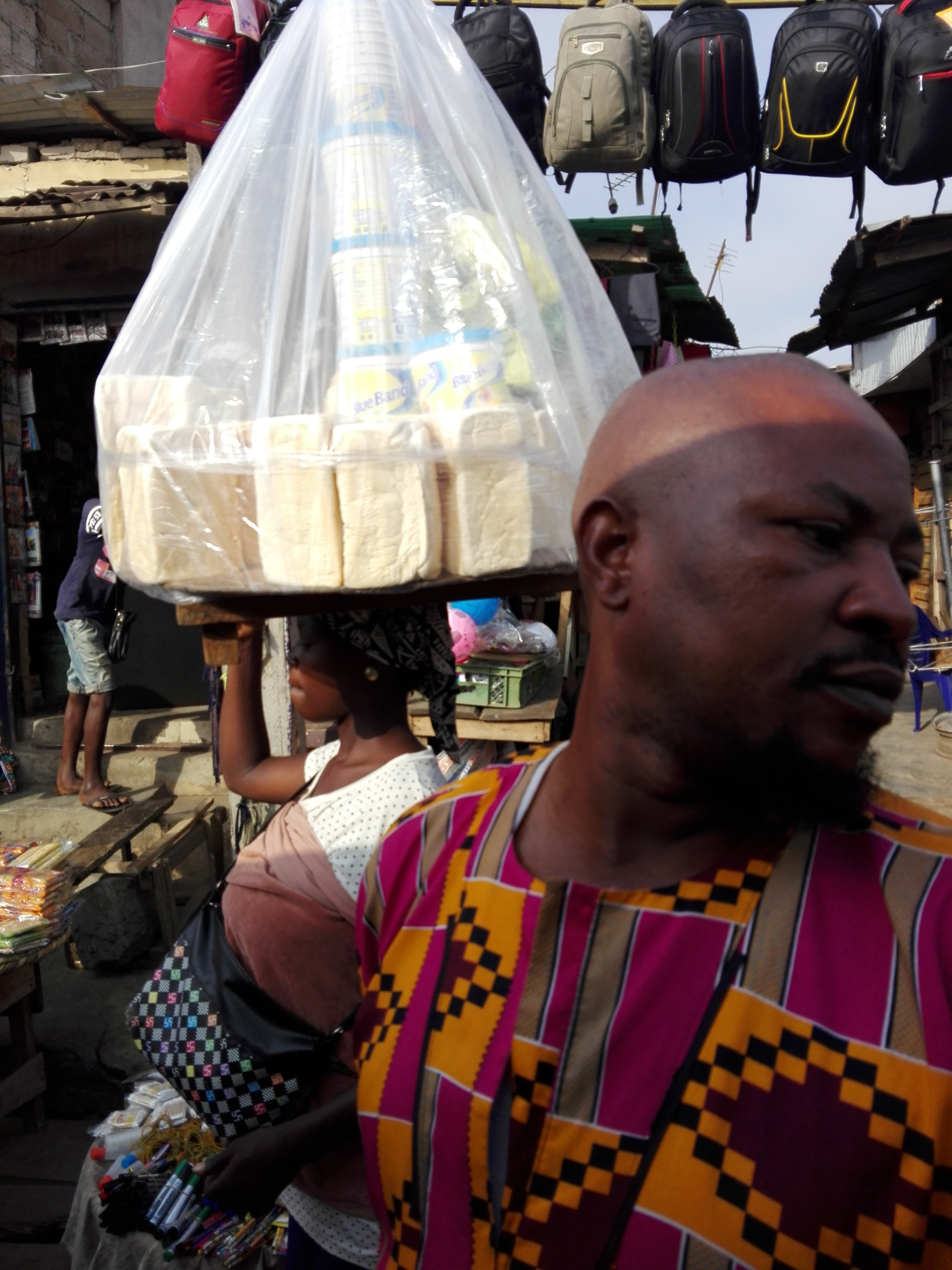
- Agege bread being sold by a vendor in Nigeria.
- Type: Bread
- Course: Street food
- Place of origin: Nigeria
- Region or state: Agege, Lagos State
- Associated cuisine: Nigerian cuisine
- Main ingredients: wheat flour, yeast, sugar

Agege bread is a sweet, yeasted white wheat bread originally from Agege in Lagos State, Nigeria. Agege bread is commonly baked in lidded rectangular metal pans, similar to a Pullman loaf. Agege bread spread in popularity from Agege to other parts of the country, where it is commonly sold by street vendors and in markets. The bread was introduced to Nigeria by Amos Stanley Wynter Shackleford, a Jamaican who migrated to Lagos in the 20th century. It was later revived in the 1960s by Alhaji Ayokunnu.

== History ==
Agege bread's story starts in the town of Agege, Lagos State, during Nigeria's colonial period. Lagos, a major West African port city, was the entry point for foreign ideas. For example, European settlers and missionaries introduced new bread making techniques to the region. Alhaji Ayokunnu is credited as the first to bake Agege bread when he founded a bakery near the newly constructed Nigerian Railway Corporation station in Agege. The railway station increased traffic to Alhaji's bakery, allowing his bread to reach far and wide across West Africa. Though bread traditionally was not an essential component of the Nigerian diet, which was dominated primarily by indigenous staples like yam, cassava, and millet, as urbanisation spread and Lagos developed into a commercial hub, bread became increasingly popular due to its convenience with some of the latter ingredients being incorporated.

== Overview ==
Agege bread is a household name in Nigeria, valued for its affordability, soft texture, and stretchiness. It is also associated with a sense of nostalgia, as it is commonly eaten with dishes such as beans (ewa agayin) and Akara.

The main ingredients used in the preparation of Agege bread include bread flour, sugar, dry yeast, room-temperature butter, tepid water, whole milk, and boiling water.

== See also ==
- List of African dishes
- Nigerian cuisine
