= List of Asian cuisines =

Location of the continent of Asia.

This is a list of Asian cuisines, by region. A cuisine is a characteristic style of cooking practices and traditions, usually associated with a specific culture or region. Asia, being the largest, most populous and culturally diverse continent, has a great diversity of cuisines associated with its different regions.

== East Asian cuisine ==
Location of East Asia.

East Asian cuisine has evolved with common usage of oils, fats and sauces in the preparation of dishes.

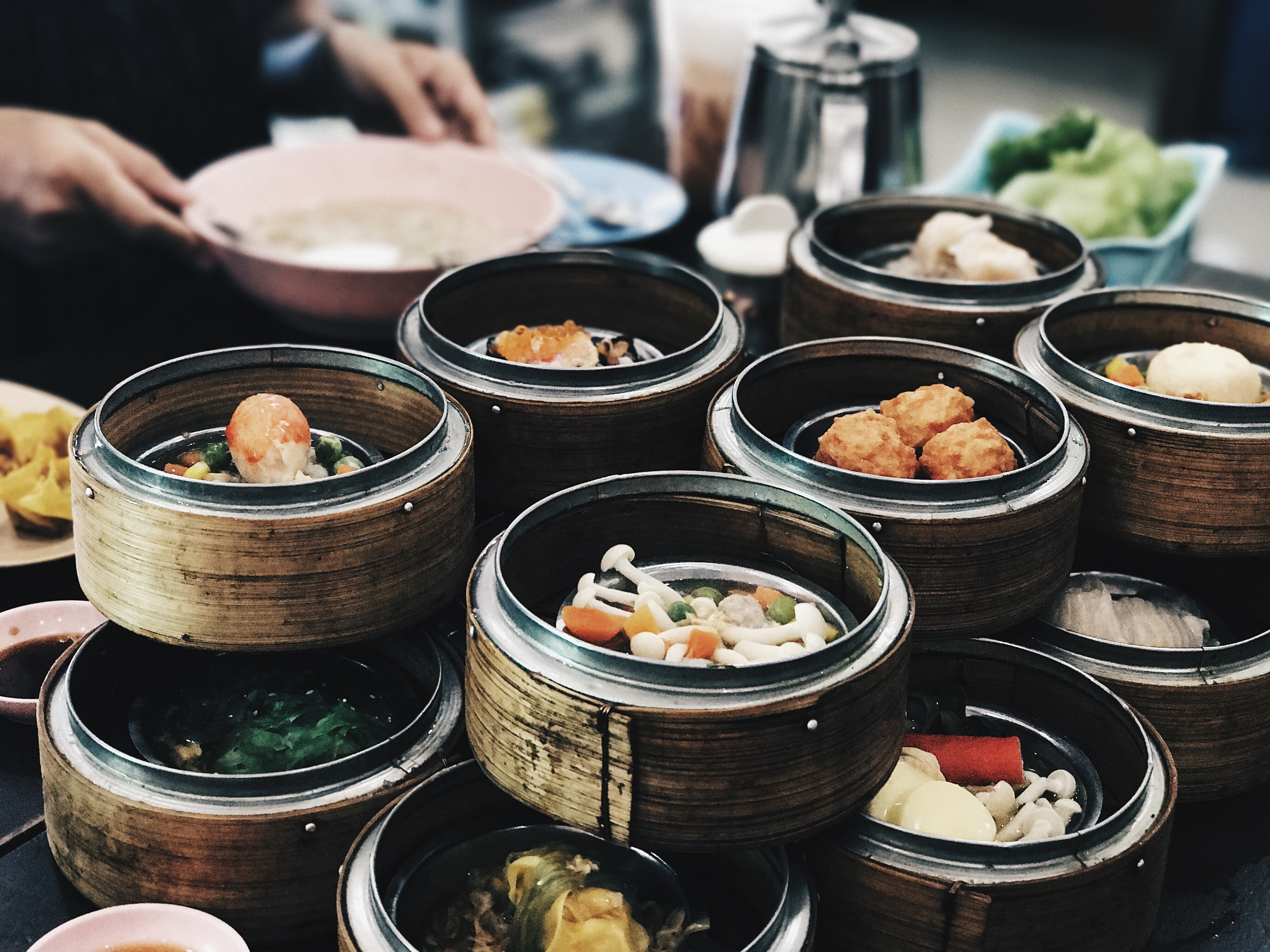
An assortment of Hong Kong dim sum delicacies

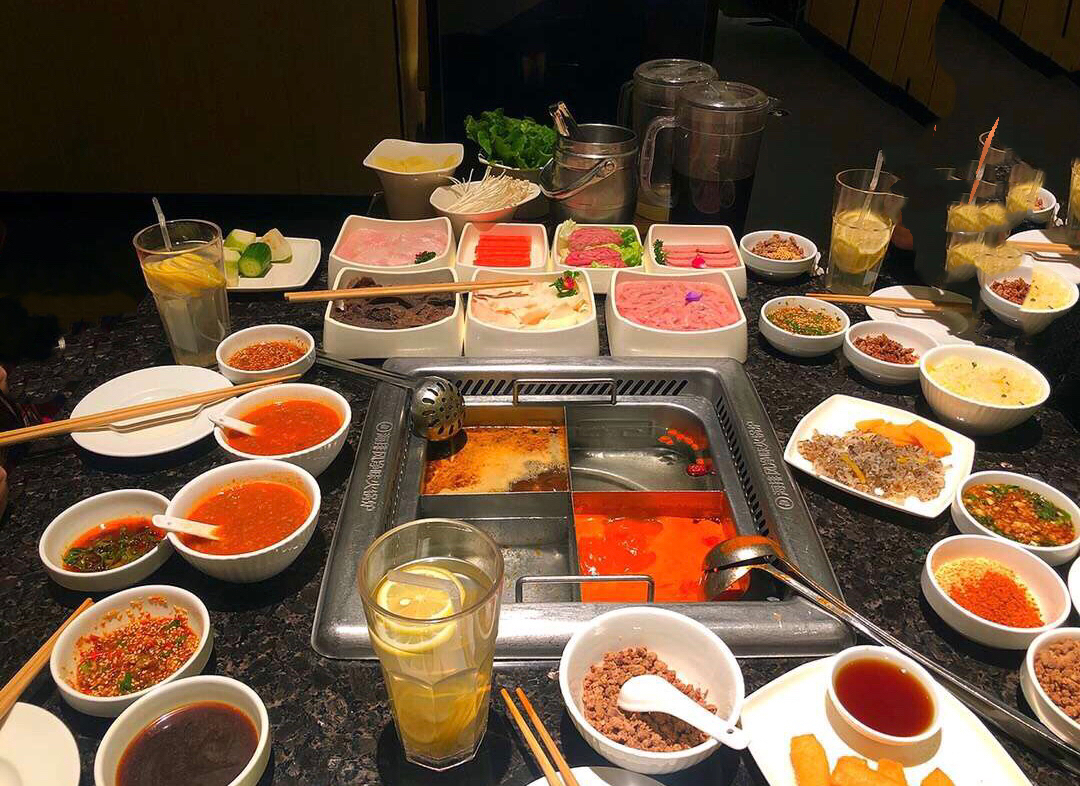
Hot pot featuring a simmering soup stock involving a variety of Chinese foodstuffs and ingredients that are served beside the pot for the diners to put in.

- Chinese cuisine – Traditional Chinese cuisines include Anhui, Cantonese, Fujian, Hunan, Jiangsu, Shandong, Sichuan, and Zhejiang, all of which are defined and termed per the respective regions within China where they developed. A number of different styles contribute to Chinese cuisine, but perhaps the best known and most influential are the Sichuan, Shandong, Jiangsu and Guangdong cuisines. These styles are distinctive from one another due to factors such as available resources, climate, geography, history, cooking techniques and lifestyle. Many Chinese traditional regional cuisines rely on basic methods of food preservation such as drying, salting, pickling and fermentation.
  - Chinese cuisine originated in what is known as the Eight Great Traditions, though it can be generalized into northern styles that feature oils and strong flavors derived from ingredients such as vinegar and garlic, while southern styles tend to favor fresh ingredients that are lightly prepared. It has become widespread throughout many other parts of the world — from Asia to the Americas, Australia, Western Europe and Southern Africa. In recent years, connoisseurs of Chinese cuisine have also sprouted in Eastern Europe and South Asia. American Chinese cuisine and Canadian Chinese food are popular examples of local varieties. Local ingredients would be adopted while maintaining the style and preparation technique.
  - Wine in China
  - Great Traditions
    - Eight Great Traditions – Regional cultural differences vary greatly amongst the different regions of China, giving rise to eight main regional cuisines, or Eight Great Traditions (八大菜系, Bā Dà Cài Xì)
      1. Anhui is derived from the native cooking styles of the Huangshan Mountains region in China and is similar to Jiangsu cuisine. It is known for the use of wild herbs, from both land and sea, and simple methods of preparation.
      2. Cantonese comes from Guangdong Province in southern China. Due to Guangdong's location on the southern coast of China, fresh live seafood is prominent in Cantonese cuisine. Canton has long been a trading port and many imported foods and ingredients are used in Cantonese cuisine. Char siu is a popular way to flavor and prepare pork in Cantonese cuisine.
      3. Fujian is one of the native Chinese cuisines derived from the native cooking style of the province of Fujian, China. Many diverse seafoods and woodland delicacies are used, including a myriad of fish, shellfish and turtles, along with edible mushrooms and bamboo shoots, provided by the coastal and mountainous regions of Fujian.
      4. Hunan, sometimes called Xiang cuisine, consists of the cuisines of the Xiang River region, Dongting Lake and western Hunan Province, in China. The cuisine is well known for its hot spicy flavor, fresh aroma and deep color. Common cooking techniques include stewing, frying, pot-roasting, braising, and smoking. Due to the high agricultural output of the region, ingredients for Hunan dishes are many and varied.
      5. Jiangsu is derived from the native cooking styles of the Jiangsu region in China. Food texture is often soft, but not to the point of mushy or falling apart. Other characters include the strict selection of ingredients according to the seasons, emphasis on the matching color and shape of each dish and emphasis on using soup to improve the flavor.
      6. Shandong in Chinese is more commonly known as Lu cuisine, and is derived from the native cooking styles of Shandong, an eastern coastal province of China. Possibly Shandong's greatest contribution to Chinese cuisine has been in the area of brewing vinegar. Hundreds of years of experience combined with unique local methods have led to Shandong's prominence as one of the premier regions for vinegar production in China.
      7. Sichuan is a style of Chinese cuisine originating in the Sichuan Province of southwestern China famed for bold flavors, particularly the pungency and spiciness resulting from liberal use of garlic and chili peppers, as well as the unique flavor of the Sichuan peppercorn (花椒). Peanuts, sesame paste, and ginger are also prominent ingredients in Sichuan cooking.
      8. Zhejiang is derived from the native cooking styles of the Zhejiang region in China. Food made in the Zhejiang style is not greasy, having instead a fresh and soft flavor with a mellow fragrance.
      - Four Great Traditions – often considered the standouts of Chinese cuisine and due to their influence are proclaimed as the Four Great Traditions (四大菜系, Sì Dà Cài Xì).
        1. Cantonese
        2. Sichuan
        3. Shandong
        4. Huaiyang cuisine – often viewed as the representation of the entire Jiangsu cuisine.
    - Chinese cultural subcuisines
      - Chinese Buddhist cuisine
      - Chinese Islamic cuisine
    - Chinese cuisines, by region
      - Anhui cuisine
      - Beijing cuisine
        - Chinese aristocrat cuisine
        - Chinese imperial cuisine
        - Liaoning cuisine
      - Cantonese cuisine
      - Chaozhou cuisine
      - Chiuchow cuisine
      - Fujian cuisine
      - Guizhou cuisine
      - Hainan cuisine
      - Hakka cuisine
      - Henan cuisine
      - Hubei cuisine
      - Hunan cuisine
      - Jiangsu cuisine
        - Huaiyang cuisine
      - Jiangxi cuisine
      - Manchu cuisine
      - Northeastern Chinese cuisine
      - Shaanxi cuisine
      - Shandong cuisine
      - Shanghai cuisine
      - Shanxi cuisine
      - Sichuan cuisine (Sichuan)
      - Tianjin cuisine
      - Tibetan cuisine
      - Uyghur cuisine
      - Yunnan cuisine
      - Zhejiang cuisine
  - Hong Kong cuisine is mainly influenced by Cantonese cuisine, non-Cantonese Chinese cuisine (especially Teochew, Hakka, Hokkien and the Jiangsu & Zhejiang), the Western world, Japan, and Southeast Asia, due to Hong Kong's past as a British colony and long history of being an international city of commerce. Fish balls, wonton noodle, egg waffle, and milk tea are some of the most notable dishes, snacks, and drinks.
  - Macau cuisine

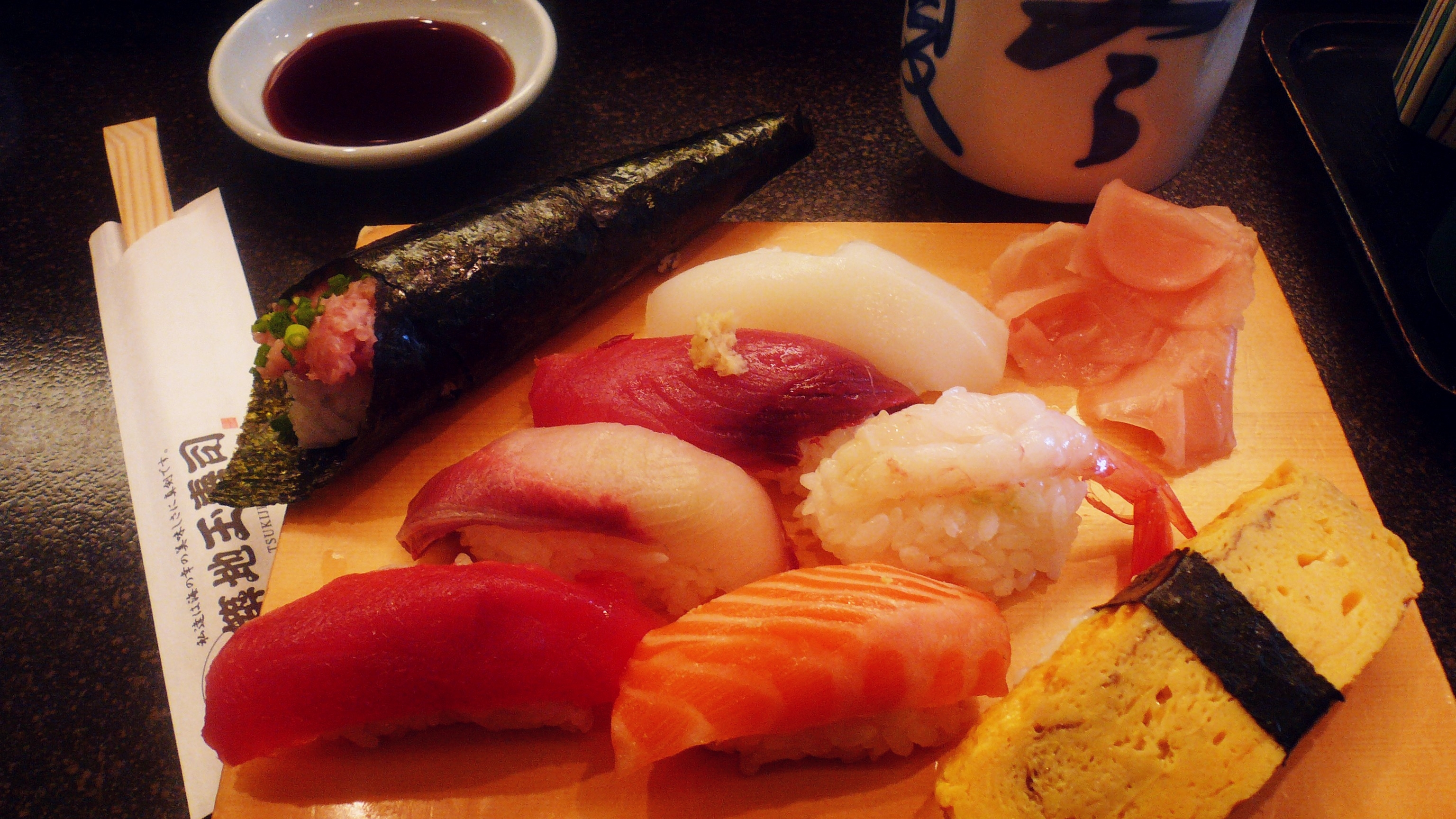
Different varieties of nigiri-sushi

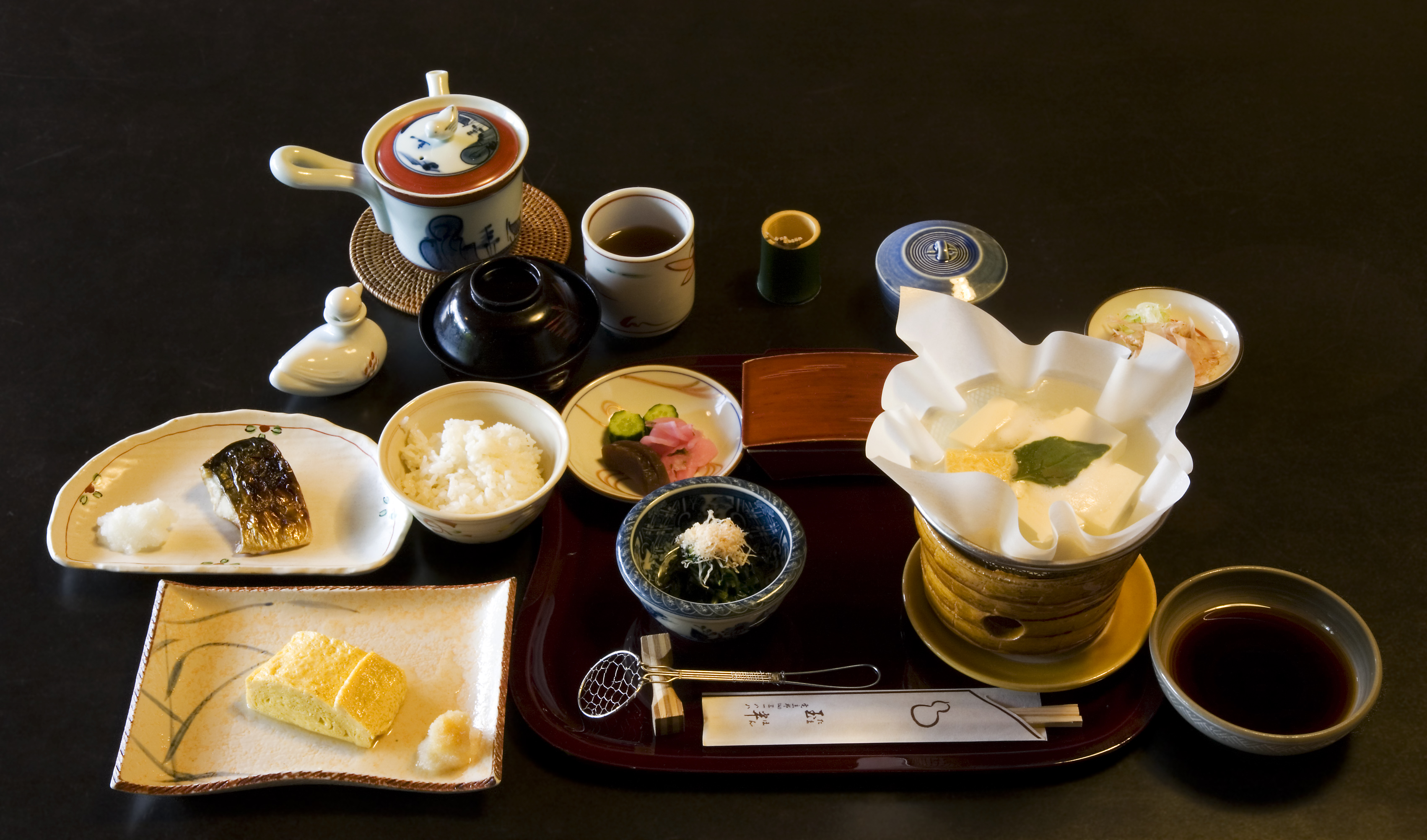
Kaiseki is a traditional multi-course Japanese dinner. The term also refers to the collection of skills and techniques used in the preparation of such meals, and are analogous to Western haute cuisine.

- Japanese cuisine is known for its emphasis on seasonality of food (旬, shun), quality of ingredients and presentation. Japanese regional cuisine includes a vast array of regional specialties known as kyōdo ryōri in Japanese, many of them originating from dishes prepared using local ingredients and traditional recipes. Sushi and sashimi are both part of the cuisine of the island nation. The Michelin Guide has awarded Japanese cities by far the most Michelin stars of any country in the world (for example, Tokyo alone has more Michelin stars than Paris, Hong Kong, New York, LA and London combined).
  - Traditional cooking methods eschew the use of oils and fats, with a focus on featuring the delicate flavors of the natural ingredients. Due to an abundant seafood supply, the traditional Japanese diet featured minimal use of meat; however, modern Japanese cuisine includes an extensive variety of popular meat dishes. Japanese cuisine offers a vast array of regional specialties that use traditional recipes and local ingredients.
  - Japanese wine
  - Okinawan cuisine is the cuisine of the Japanese island of Okinawa. Due to the difference in culture, climate, vegetables and other ingredients between Okinawa and mainland Japan, Okinawan cuisine is very different from Japanese cuisine. The cuisine incorporated influence from Chinese cuisine and Southeast Asian cuisine due to trade. The sweet potato, introduced in Okinawa in 1605, became a staple food there until the beginning of the 20th century. An article about Okinawan food written by Kikkoman stated that Goya (bitter melon) and Nabera (luffa or towel gourd) were "likely" introduced to Okinawa from Southeast Asia. Since Ryūkyū had served as a tributary state to China, Okinawan cooks traveled to Fujian Province to learn how to cook Chinese food; Chinese influence seeped into Okinawa in that manner. The same Kikkoman article states that the method of distillation of awamori likely originated from Siam (Thailand) and traveled to Okinawa during the 15th century. After the lord of the Kagoshima Domain subjugated Ryūkyū, Okinawan cooks traveled to Japan to study Japanese cuisine, causing that influence to seep into Okinawan cuisine.
  - Nagoya cuisine
  - Ainu cuisine

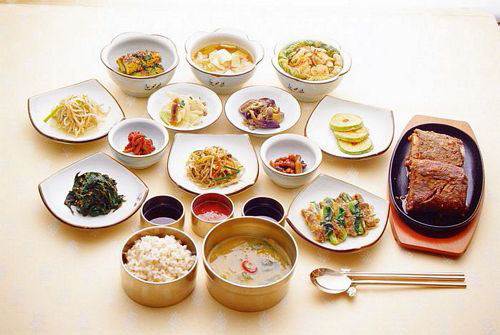
Hanjeongsik, a full-course Korean meal with an array of banchan (side dishes)

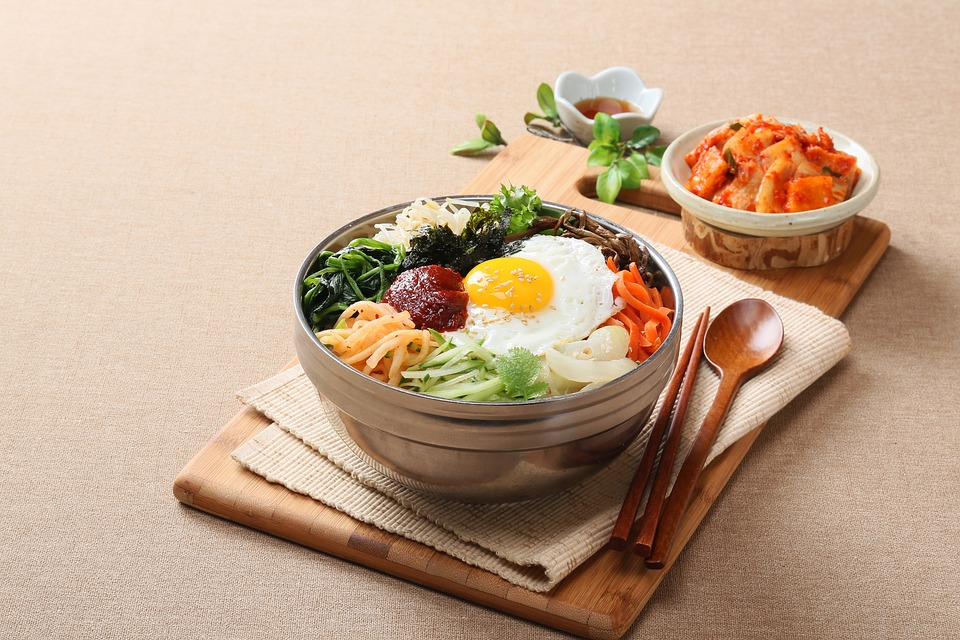
Bibimbap, a Korean rice dish filled with white rice topped with namul or kimchi and gochujang, doenjang commonly added by a raw or fried egg and sliced meat on top.

- Korean cuisine originated from ancient prehistoric traditions in the Korean peninsula, evolving through a complex interaction of environmental, political, and cultural trends. Korean cuisine is largely based upon rice, vegetables, and meats. Traditional Korean meals are noted for the number of side dishes (banchan) that accompany steam-cooked short-grain rice. Kimchi is served often, sometimes at every meal. Commonly used ingredients include sesame oil, doenjang (fermented bean paste), soy sauce, salt, garlic, ginger, pepper flakes, and gochujang (fermented red chili paste). Korean regional cuisine (Korean: hyangto eumsik, literally "native local foods"), is characterized by local specialties and distinctive styles within Korean cuisine. The divisions reflected historical boundaries of the provinces where these food and culinary traditions were preserved until modern times. Korean barbecue, or gogi gui, refers to the Korean method of grilling beef, pork, chicken, or other types of meat. Such dishes are often prepared at the diner's table on gas or charcoal grills that are built into the center of the table itself. It features cooking methods such as sautéing and what is known in the West as barbecue. Strong flavors featuring spices derived from chili peppers can also be found in dishes such as kimchi.
  - Gungjung (Hangul: 궁중) food: A splendid table setting that has been handed down since the Three Kingdoms period since central power was solidified. It is characterized by selecting various local ingredients and mixing them in various ways without being particularly biased.
  - Commoner Cuisine: Much influenced by yangban (elite) families.

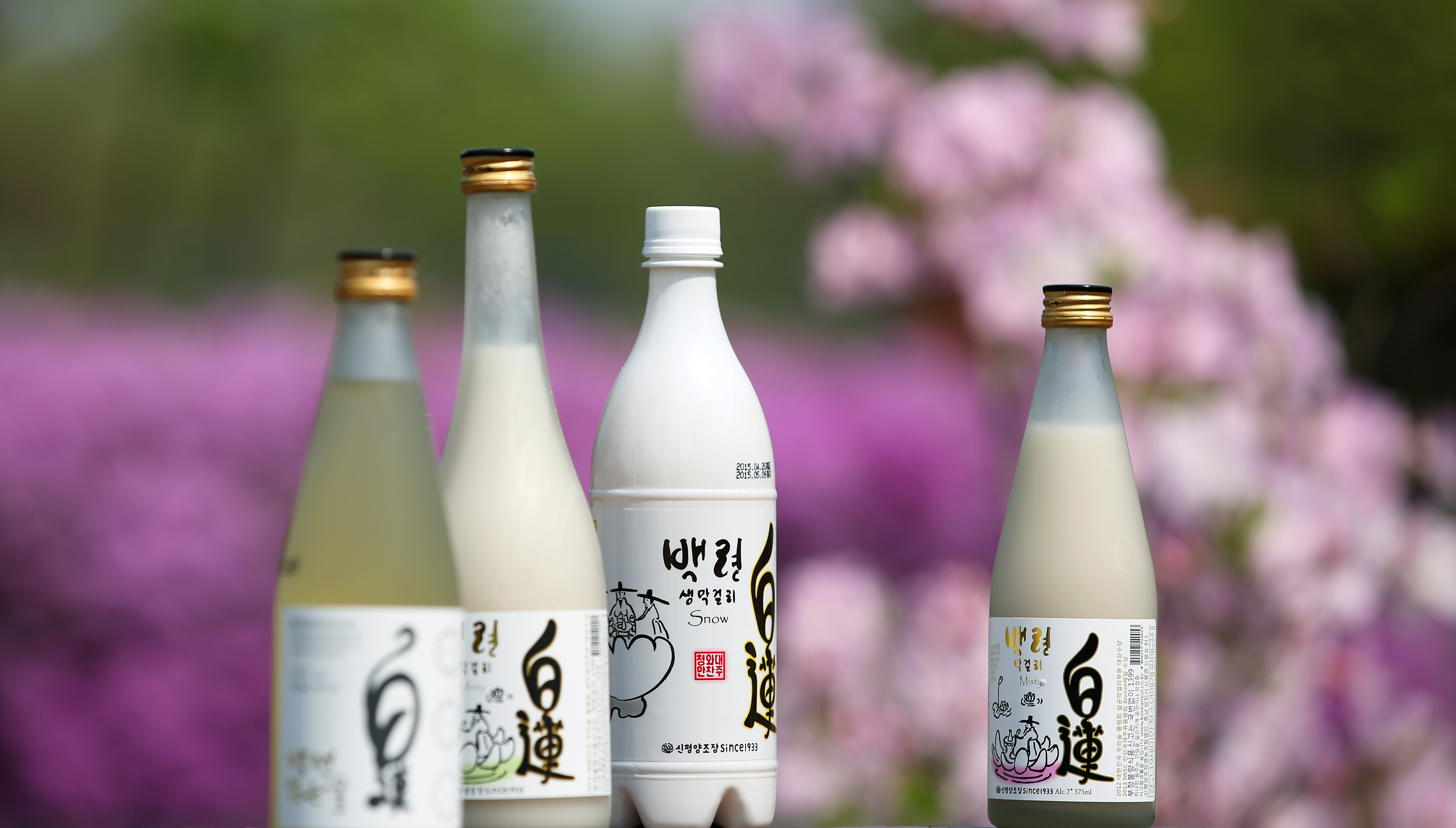
Koren traditional liquor makgeolli

  - Korean traditional liquor makgeolli(Hangul: 막걸리) is a brewer made of rice. It is characterized by a subtle savory and slightly sweet taste and a slightly pungent feeling, and popularly consumed in South Korea along with soju. It is nutritious because the nutrients of rice are melted.
  - Korean royal court cuisine
  - Korean temple cuisine
  - North Korean cuisine
  - South Korean cuisine
- Mongolian cuisine – local culinary traditions of Mongolia and Mongolian styled dishes. The extreme continental climate has affected the traditional diet, so the Mongolian cuisine primarily consists of dairy products, meat, and animal fats. Use of vegetables and spices are limited.
- Taiwanese cuisine – Majority Han Taiwanese cuisine and the Aboriginal Taiwanese cuisine, however mixed with part of Japanese cuisine due to Imperial Japanese colonial legacies.
  East Asian cuisine
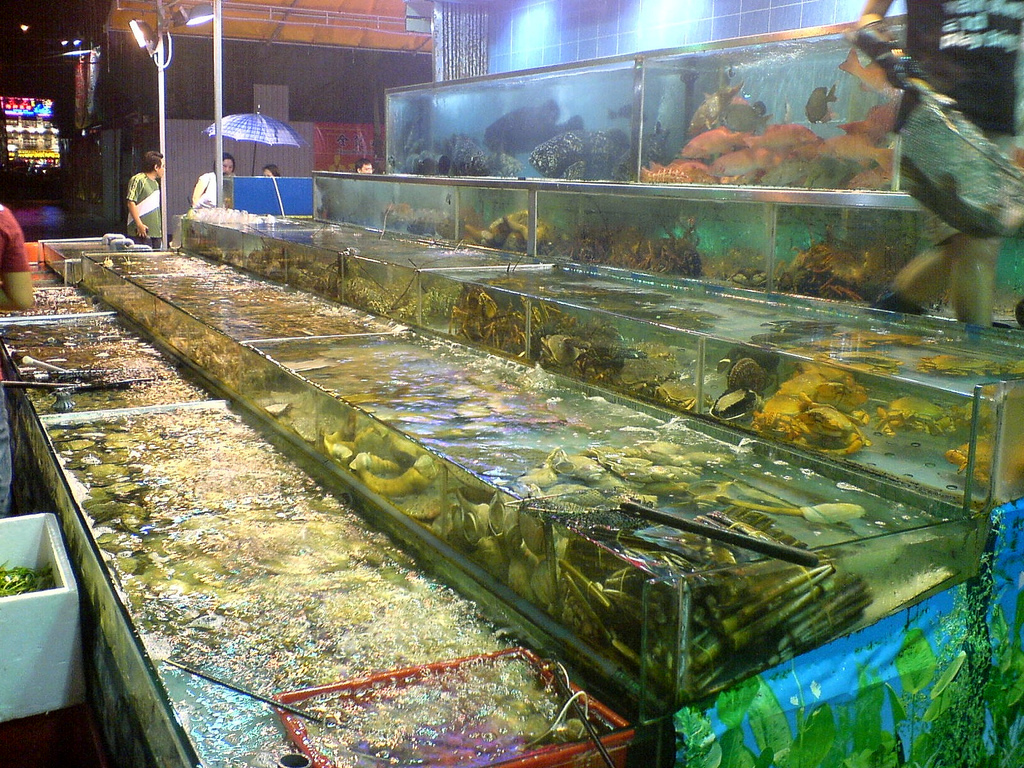
  Due to Guangdong's location on the southern coast of China, fresh live seafood is a specialty in Cantonese cuisine.
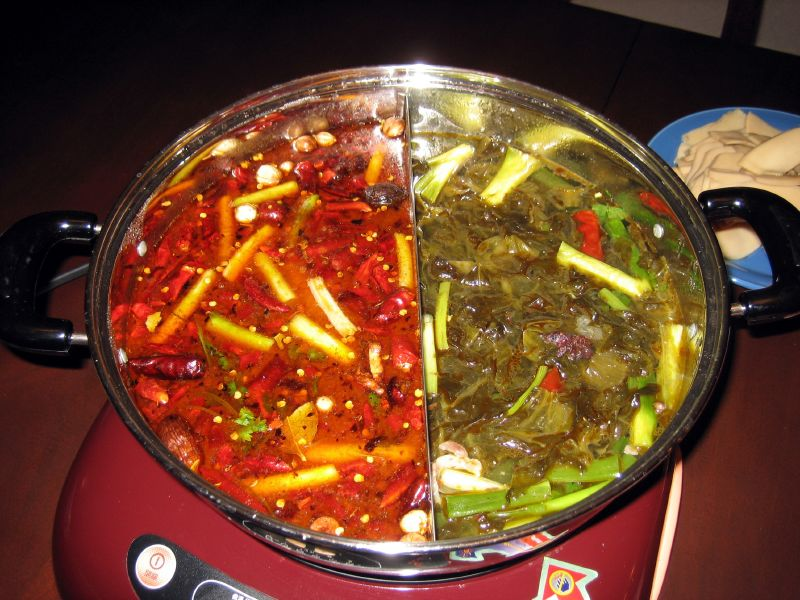
  Sichuan cuisine – A Chengdu-style, hot-pot stew.
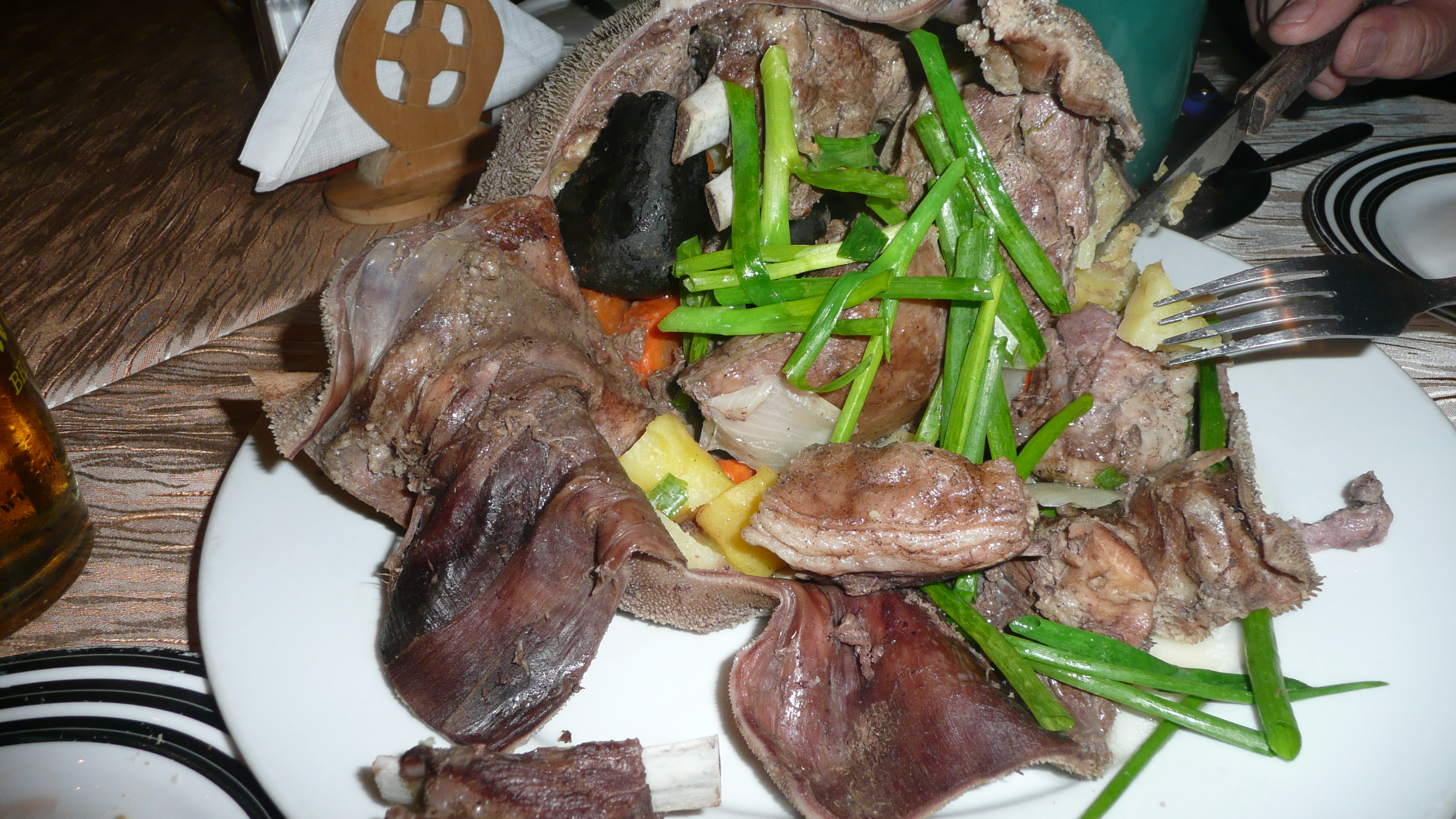
  Khorkhog, a barbecue dish consumed in Mongolia
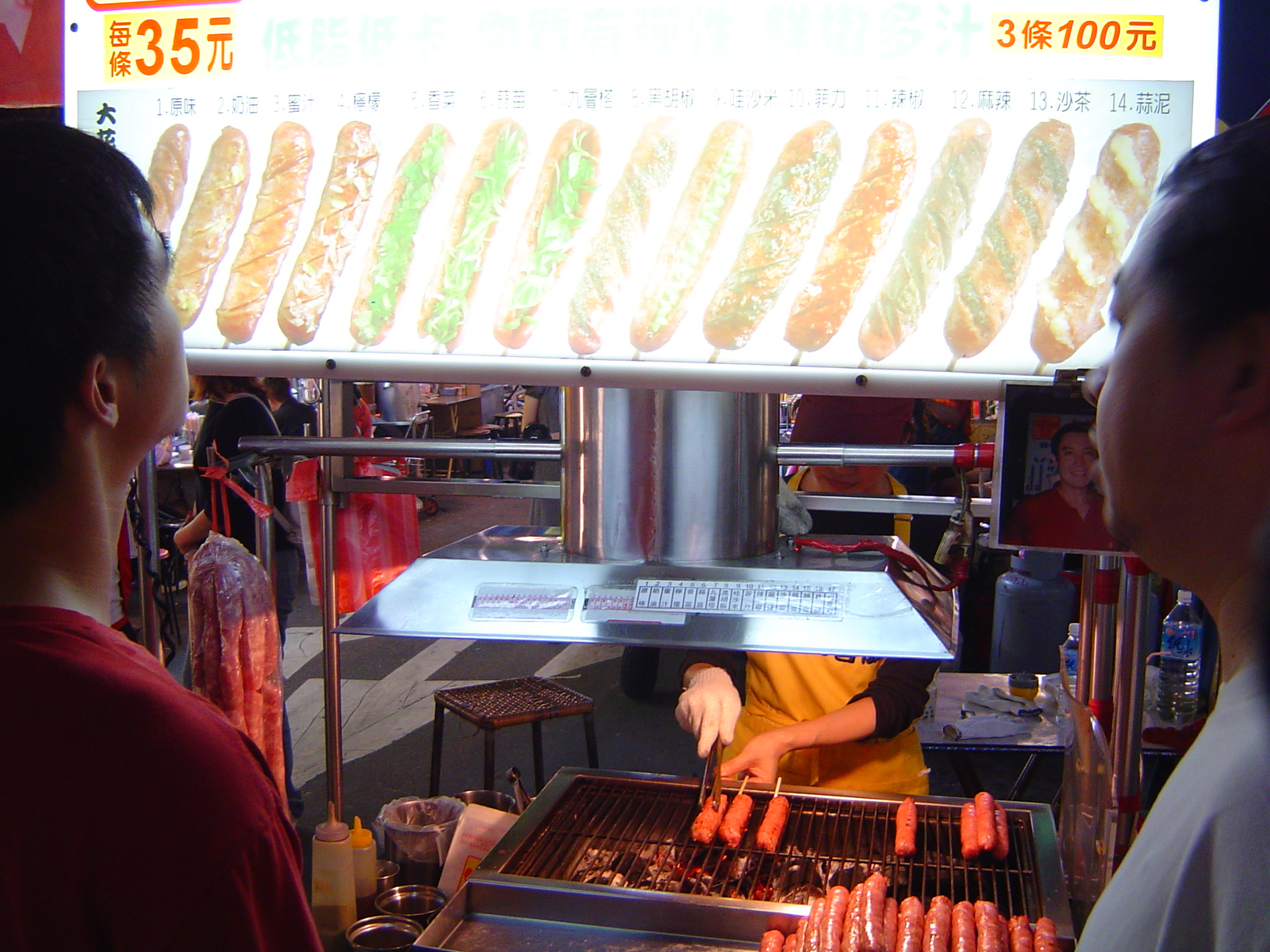
  Many flavors of Taiwanese sausages are sold by night market vendors.

== Southeast Asian cuisine ==
Location of Southeast Asia.

Southeast Asian cuisine emphasizes lightly prepared dishes with strong aromas, featuring such flavors as lemongrass, fermented fish sauce and pastes, and ginger. Ingredients in the region contrast with the ones in the Eastern Asian cuisines, substituting fish sauces for soy sauce and including such ingredients as galangal, tamarind and lemongrass. Cooking methods include stir frying, boiling and steaming.

- Bruneian cuisine is similar to, and heavily influenced by, the cuisine of neighboring Malaysia, Singapore, and Indonesia, with additional influences from China, India and Arab.
- Burmese cuisine has been influenced greatly by China, India and Thailand. However, Burmese cuisine has retained unique preparation techniques and distinct flavors, and there are many regional variations of "standard" dishes. The Burmese eat with their right hand, forming rice into a small ball with only the fingertips and mixing this with various morsels before popping it into their mouths. The Burmese eat a great variety of vegetables and fruits, and a variety of meat. A very popular vegetable is the danyin thi, which is usually boiled or roasted and dipped in salt, oil and sometimes, cooked coconut fat.
- Cambodian cuisine encompasses the cuisines of all ethnic groups in Cambodia, whereas Khmer cuisine refers specifically to the cuisine of the ethnic Khmers. Over time, Khmer cuisine has absorbed elements from Indian, Chinese and more recently French cuisine, and due to historic interaction and shared influences, Cambodian cuisine has many similarities with neighboring Thai, Vietnamese, and Lao cuisines.
- Christmas Island cuisine has influences from both Australian cuisine and other Asian cuisines, particularly Malaysian and Indonesian.
- Cuisine of East Timor is the cuisine of one of the newest Southeast Asian countries.
- Filipino cuisine has evolved over several centuries from its Austronesian origins to a mixed cuisine with many Hispanic, Chinese, American, and other Asian influences adapted to indigenous ingredients and the local palate. For more information refer to: Filipino cuisine; regional specialties.
  - Kapampangan cuisine is the cuisine native to the Kapampangan people originating from the province of Pampanga, in Central Luzon. One of the best examples of Kapampangan dish is sisig, which is a popular dish across the Philippines.
  - Bicol's cuisine is noted for its gastronomic appetite for the fiery or chili-hot dishes and coconut milk dishes. Perhaps the most well-known Bicolano dish is the very spicy Bicol express. The region is also the well-known home of natong also known as laing or pinangat (pork or fish stew in taro leaves).
  - Being surrounded by waters and rich land, Visayas is abundant in marine and land products as indicated in various Visayan cuisines. Few examples of famous Visayan foods include Cebu's Lechon variant, Iloilo's La Paz batchoy, Bacolod's inasal and piaya, and Leyte's roscas, humba, moron, and bukayo.
  - Mindanao cuisine's dishes are richly flavored with the spices common to Southeast Asia. Some parts of Mindanao are predominantly Muslim, where pork is rarely consumed. Most notable dishes in Mindanao cuisine are: Satti, Sambal, Tiyula itum, and Zamboanga's Alfajor, curacha, and rebosao.
- Hmong cuisine is the cuisine of the Hmong people, originally of China, now a diaspora across Southeast Asia with a significant Hmong American community in the United States.
- Indonesian cuisine is diverse, in part because Indonesia is composed of approximately 6,000 populated islands. Many regional cuisines exist, often based upon cultural and foreign influences. For example, Sumatran cuisine often has Middle Eastern and Indian influences, featuring curried meat and vegetables, while Javanese cuisine and Sundanese cuisine are more indigenous.
  - Acehnese cuisine is the cuisine of the Acehnese people of Aceh in most western Sumatra.
  - Balinese cuisine is the cuisine and culinary traditions of Balinese people from the volcanic island of Bali.
  - Banjar cuisine: is the cooking tradition and cuisine of Banjar people of South Kalimantan in Indonesia.
  - Batak cuisine is the cuisine and cooking traditions of Batak ethnic groups, predominantly found in North Sumatra region.
  - Indo cuisine is a fusion cooking and cuisine tradition, mainly existing in Indonesia (nationwide) and the Netherlands, as well as Belgium, South Africa and Suriname.
  - Indonesian Arab cuisine is characterized by the mixture of Middle Eastern cuisine with local Indonesian style. Indonesian Arabs brought their legacy of Arab cuisine originally from Hadhramaut, Hejaz and Egypt.
  - Indonesian Chinese cuisine is characterized by the mixture of Chinese with local Indonesian style. Chinese Indonesians bring their Chinese cuisine legacy.
  - Indonesian Indian cuisine is characterized by the mixture of Indian cuisine with local Indonesian style. Indian Indonesians bring their Indian cuisine legacy.
  - Javanese cuisine is the cuisine of Javanese people. In wider sense, Javanese cuisine might also refer to the cuisine of the whole people of Java Island, Indonesia; which also includes Sundanese in West Java, Betawi in Jakarta and Madurese on Madura Island off East Java.
    - Betawi cuisine is rich, diverse and eclectic cuisine of Betawi people in Jakarta due to the Betawi people that create them were composed from numbers of regional immigrants that came from various places in the archipelago.
    - Madurese cuisine is the cuisine tradition of Madurese people in Madura island on the northeastern coast of Java.
    - Sundanese cuisine is the cuisine of Sundanese people of West Java, Indonesia. In Sundanese restaurants, it is common to eat with one's hands. They usually serve kobokan, a bowl of tap water with a slice of lime for handwashing.
  - Makassar cuisine is the cuisine of the Buginese people and Makassar people in South Sulawesi.
  - Malay cuisine is the cuisine of Malay people with many regional and foreign influences.
  - Manado cuisine is the cooking tradition of the Minahasan people of North Sulawesi. This cuisine has influences by Eurasian cuisine, especially Dutch cuisine.
  - Padang food, also known as Minangkabau cuisine, is the cuisine of the Minangkabau people of West Sumatra, Indonesia. It is among the most popular food in Maritime Southeast Asia. It is known across Indonesia as masakan Padang.
  - Palembang cuisine is the cuisine of the Palembang people in South Sumatra.
  - Peranakan cuisine combines Chinese, Malay, Javanese and other influences into a unique blend.
- Laotian cuisine is the cuisine of Laos, which is distinct from other Southeast Asian cuisines. Laos shares borders with neighboring countries and as a result, Lao cuisine has strongly influenced the neighboring cuisine of Northeastern Thailand (Isan) and some Lao culinary influences have also reached Cambodia and Northern Thailand (Lanna).
- Malaysian cuisine reflects the multicultural aspects of Malaysia. Malaysia is an amalgamation of three major races, Malay, Chinese and Indian, as well as a myriad of ethnic groups from Sabah and Sarawak. The potpourri is enriched further with the influence of the Thai from the north, Indonesian from the south, Filipino from the east, and British, Dutch and Portuguese through hundred years of colonization.
  - Malay cuisine is the cuisine of Malay people with many regional and foreign influences. For examples, cuisine of Johor often has Middle Eastern and Javanese influences while cuisine of Kelantan often has Thai influences.
  - Malaysian Chinese cuisine is characterized by the mixture of Chinese with local ingredients.
  - Malaysian Indian cuisine is characterized by the mixture of Indian with local ingredients.
  - Sarawakian cuisine is the cuisine of Sarawak, Malaysia
  - Sabahan cuisine is the cuisine of Sabah, Malaysia with influences from Filipino cuisine and Indonesian cuisine
  - Peranakan cuisine combines Chinese, Malay and other influences into a unique blend. Peranakan in Penang often has Thai influences while Melaka and Singapore often has Indonesian influences.
  - Eurasian cuisine combines Kristang, Dutch, British, Malay and other influences into a unique blend, predominantly found in Melaka
- Singaporean cuisine is similar to, and heavily influenced by the cuisine of neighboring Malaysia, as a product of centuries of cultural interaction owing to Singapore's strategic location. The predominant cuisine in Singapore is Chinese, along with Malay, Indian and English traditions since the founding of Singapore by the British in the early 19th century.
- Thai cuisine can be described as four regional cuisines corresponding to the four main regions of the country: Northern, Northeastern (or Isan), Central, and Southern. A fifth cuisine is Thai royal cuisine, based on the palace cuisine of the Ayutthaya kingdom (1351–1767 CE), which was influential upon the cuisine of the Central Thai plains. Each cuisine has similarities to foods and cuisines in neighboring countries and regions, including the Cuisine of Burma, Yunnan cuisine, Lao cuisine, Cambodian cuisine and Malaysian cuisine.
- Vietnamese cuisine is a style of cooking derived from Vietnam with Chinese and French influence. Fish sauce, soy sauce, rice, fresh herbs, fruits and vegetables are commonly used. Vietnamese recipes utilize a diverse range of herbs, including lemongrass, mint, Vietnamese mint, long coriander and Thai basil leaves.
  - Vietnamese wine
Southeast Asian cuisine

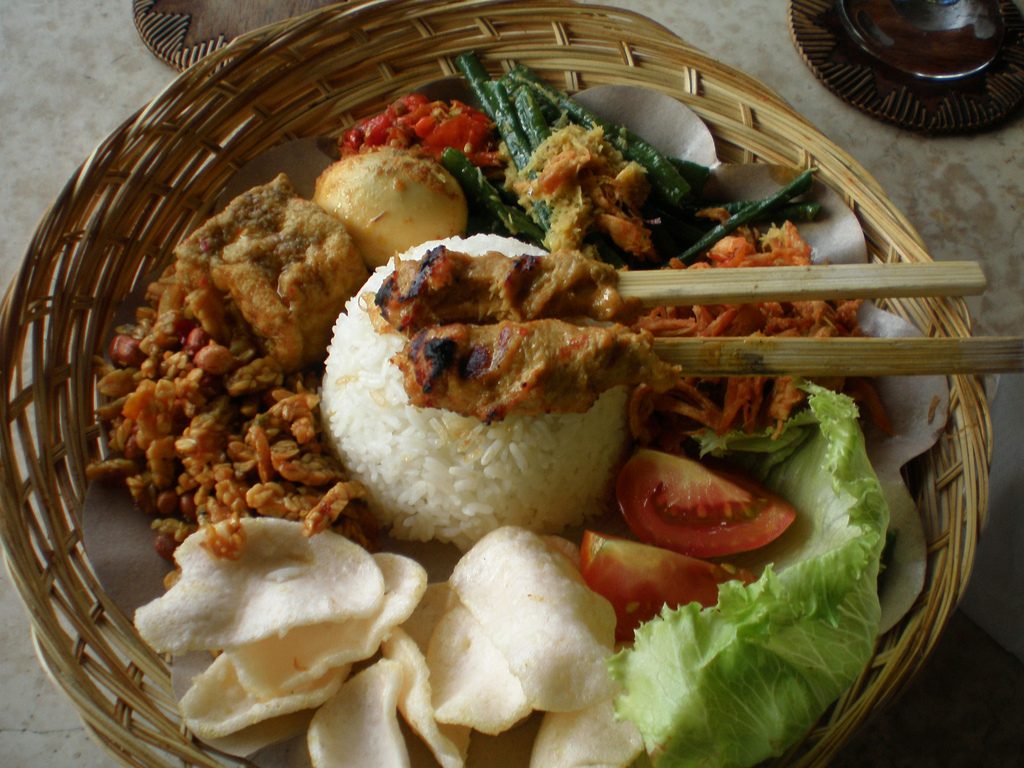
Personal serving of Nasi Bali, in Indonesia, rice surrounded by numbers of side dishes including sate lilit.

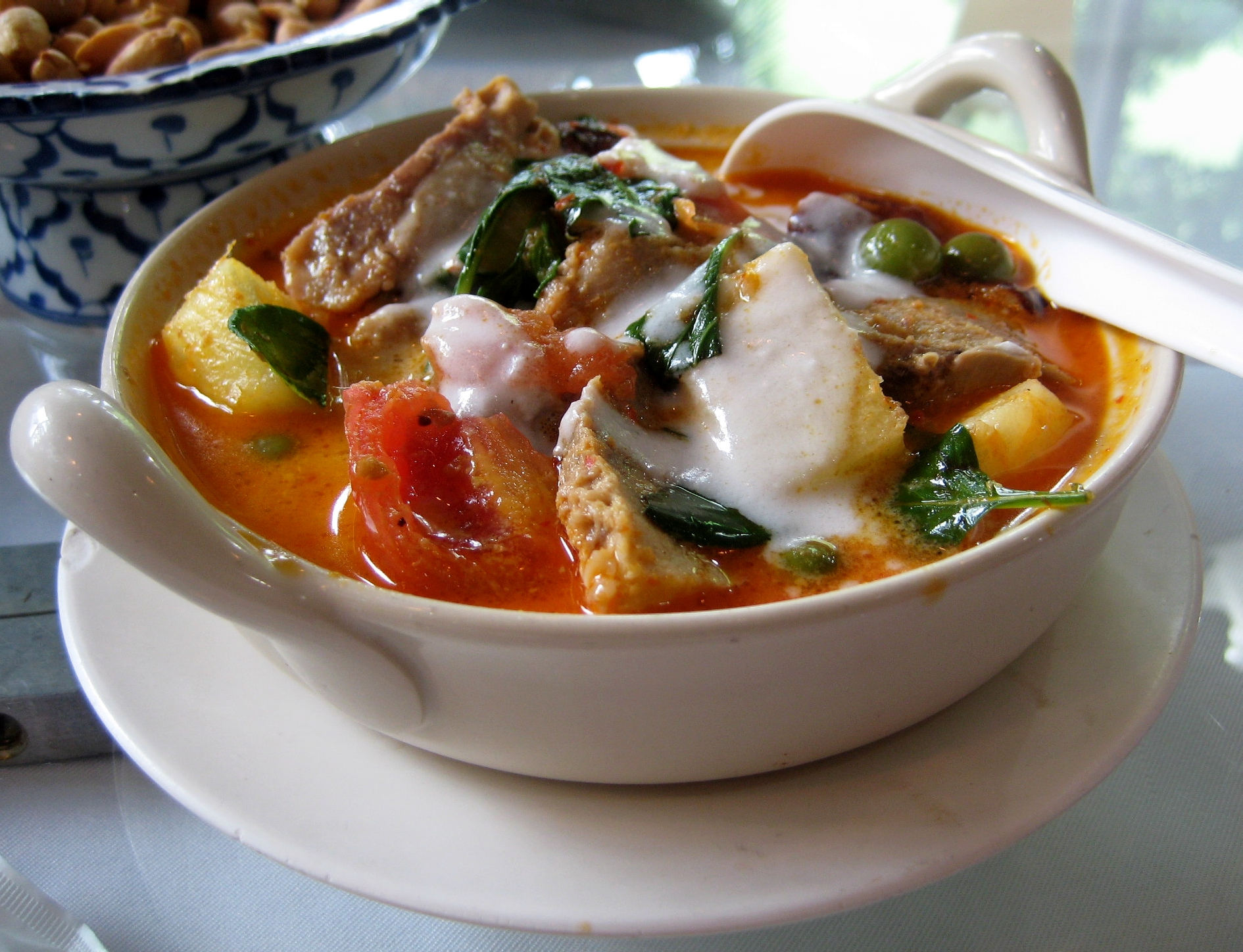
Thai Kaeng phet pet yang: roast duck in red curry.

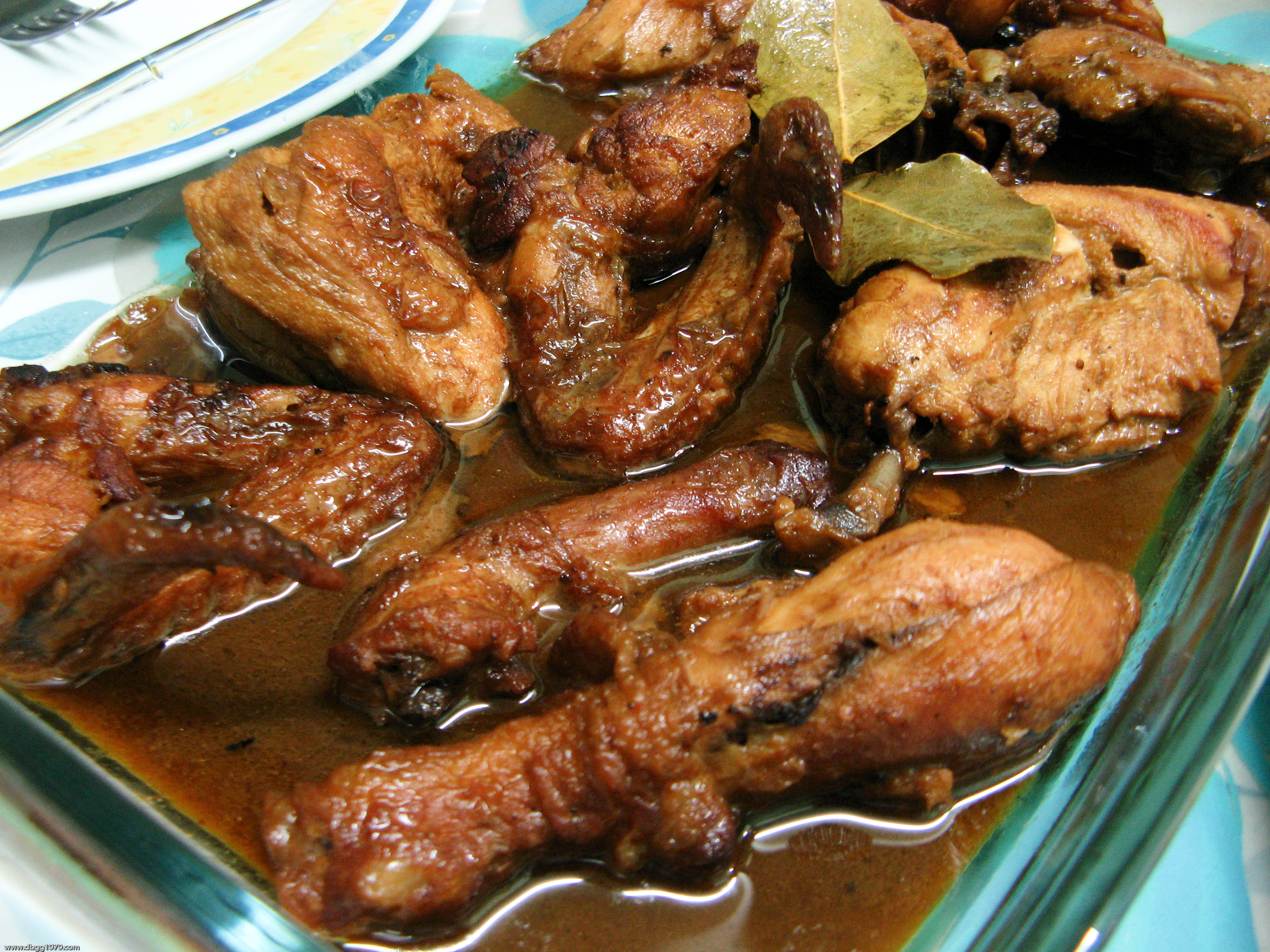
Philippine adobo is a popular Filipino dish and cooking process in Filipino cuisine.

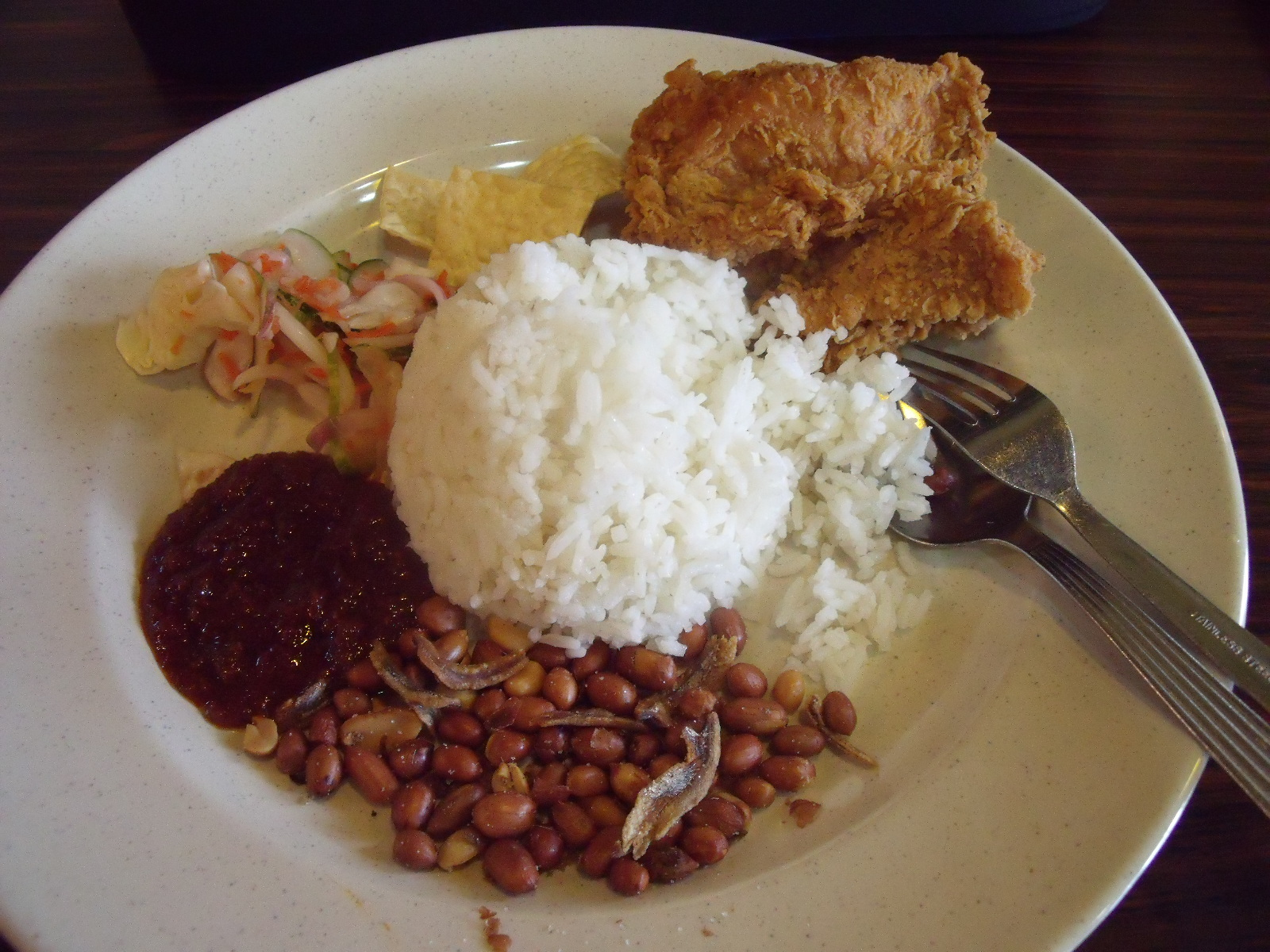
Malaysian nasi lemak, is served with anchovies, peanuts, boiled egg, lamb curry, cucumber, and sambal.

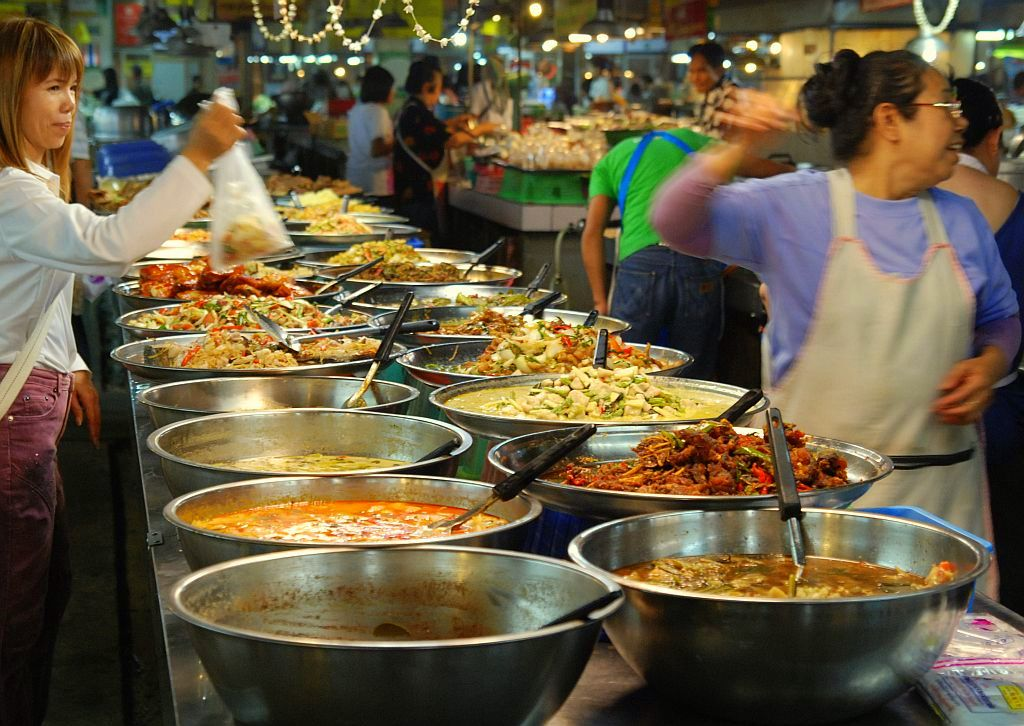
Food stall in Chiang Mai, Thailand selling ready-cooked food.

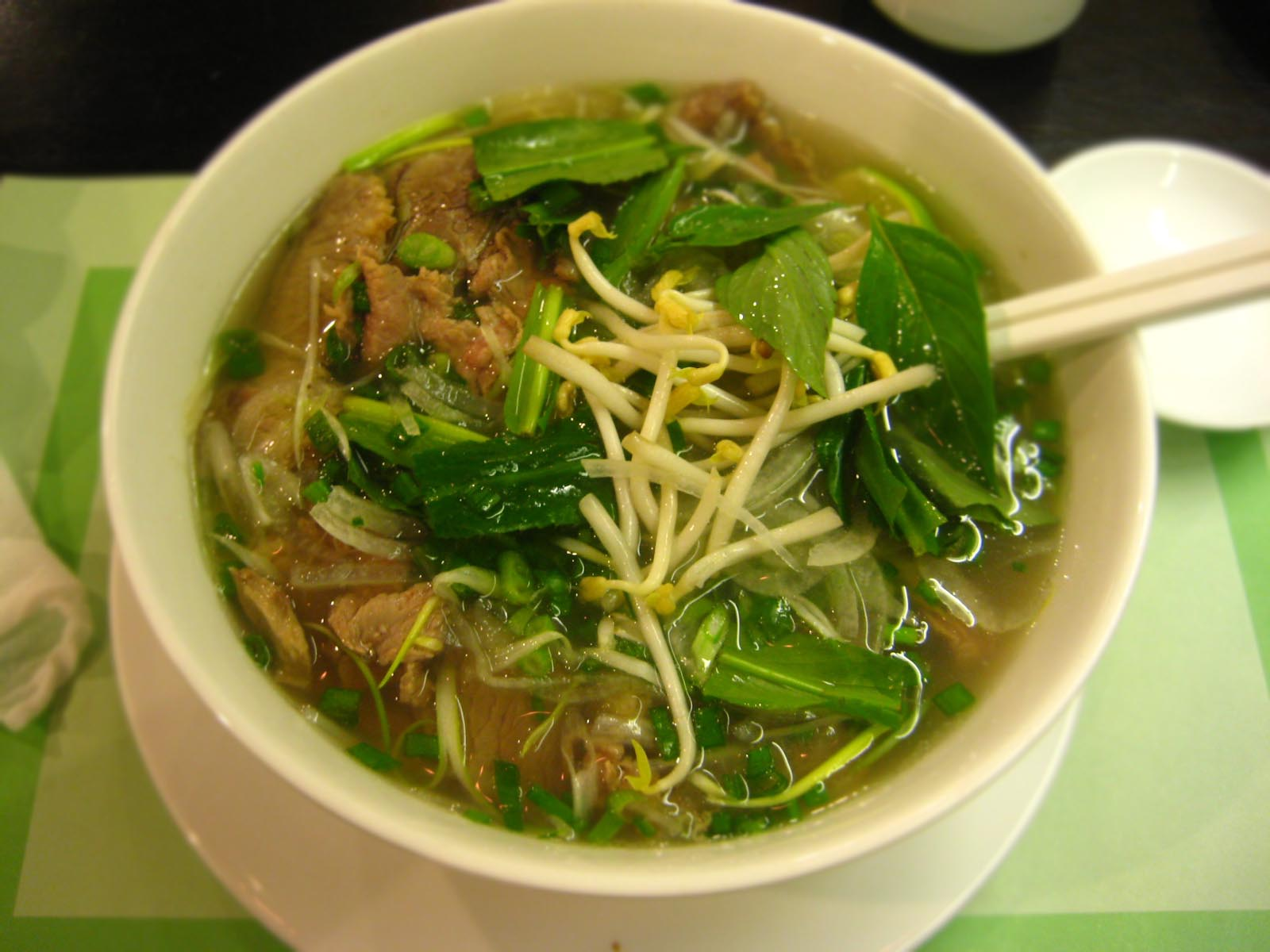
Pho is a beef or chicken noodle soup in Vietnamese cuisine.

== South Asian cuisine ==
Location of South Asia.

South Asian cuisine includes the cuisines from the Indian subcontinent and when included in the definition, also that of Afghanistan. It has roots in South Asia, including practices taken from the Hindu beliefs practiced by the large population found in the region, alongside in some regional cuisines, certain influences from neighboring regions and cultures, particularly from Muslim cultures of the Middle East and Central Asia. Dishes in this area of the world are known for their use of hot peppers, black pepper, cloves, and other strong spices along with the flavored butter ghee. Common meats include lamb, goat and chicken; beef is not as common as in western cuisines because the tenets of the Hindu faith prohibit its consumption. Other staples of many of the cuisines include rice, chapati made from wheat and barley, and beans. The cuisine of South Asia has mostly indigenous roots, as well as influences practices taken from foreign origin empires.

Naan, a type of flat bread from the former regions, is a common part of meals in many parts of South Asia.

- Afghan cuisine – cuisine of the Afghan people, largely based upon Afghanistan's chief crops: cereals like wheat, maize, barley and rice. Accompanying these staples are dairy products (yogurt and wheat), various nuts, and native vegetables, as well as fresh and dried fruits. Lamb is the primary meat for many Afghans, although Turkic peoples also eat horse. Afghanistan is also well known for its grapes.
- Bangladeshi cuisine is dominated by Bengali cuisine and has been shaped by the diverse history and riverine geography of Bangladesh. The country has a tropical monsoon climate. Rice is the main staple food of Bangladeshi people and it is served with a wide range of curries. Sublime Bangladeshi dishes exhibit strong aromatic flavors; and often include eggs, eggplants, potatoes and tomatoes. A variety of spices and herbs, along with mustard oil and ghee, is used in Bangladeshi cooking. The main breads are naan, porota, roti, bakarkhani and luchi. Dal is the second most important staple food which is served with rice/porota/luchi. Fish is a staple in Bangladeshi cuisine, especially freshwater fish, which is a distinctive feature of the country's gastronomy. Major fish dishes include ilish (hilsa), pabda (butterfish), rui (rohu), pangash (pangas catfish), chitol (clown knifefish), magur (walking catfish), bhetki (barramundi) and tilapia. Meat consumption includes beef, lamb, venison, chicken, duck, squab and koel. Vegetable dishes, either mashed (bhorta), boiled (sabji), or leaf-based (saag), are widely served. Seafood such as lobsters and shrimps are also often prevalent.
- Bhutanese cuisine employs a lot of red rice (like brown rice in texture, but with a nutty taste, the only variety of rice that grows at high altitudes), buckwheat, and increasingly maize. The diet in the hills also includes chicken, yak meat, dried beef, pork, pork fat, and mutton. When offered food, one says meshu meshu, covering one's mouth with the hands in refusal according to Bhutanese manners, and then gives in on the second or third offer.
- Hazaragi cuisine refers to the food and cuisine of the Hazara people in Afghanistan and western Pakistan (Balochistan province). The food of the Hazara people is strongly influenced by Central Asian, South Asian and Persian cuisines and shares similarities with neighboring regional cuisines in Afghanistan and Central Asia, however, there are certain dishes, culinary methods and styles of cooking that are unique to the Hazara people. It is largely centered on bread, meats and dairy products, and uses a large amount of oil in its cooking.
- Indian cuisine is characterized by its sophisticated and subtle use of many Indian spices and vegetables, herbs, and fruits grown across India. There is also the widespread practice of vegetarianism across its society. Considered by some to be one of the world's most diverse cuisines, each family of this cuisine is characterized by a wide assortment of dishes and cooking techniques. As a consequence, Indian cuisine varies from region to region, reflecting the varied demographics of the ethnically diverse Indian subcontinent. India's religious beliefs and culture has played an influential role in the evolution of its cuisine. However, cuisine across India has also evolved with the Indian subcontinent's cross-cultural interactions with the neighboring Middle East, Southeast Asia, East Asia, and Central Asia, making it a unique blend of various cuisines across Asia. The colonial period introduced European cooking styles to India adding to its flexibility and diversity. Indian cuisine has also influenced cuisines across the world, especially those from Southeast Asia. In particular, curry has been widely adopted in cuisines around the world.
  - North Indian cuisines
    - Awadhi cuisine
    - Punjabi cuisine
    - Cuisine of Uttar Pradesh
    - Rajasthani cuisine
    - Mughlai cuisine
    - Bhojpuri cuisine
    - Bihari cuisine
    - Kashmiri cuisine
    - Cuisine of Haryana
  - South Indian cuisines
    - Kerala cuisine - Sadhya means "banquet" in Malayalam. It is a typical feast of the people of Kerala.
    - Tamil cuisine
    - Andhra cuisine
    - Cuisine of Karnataka
    - Hyderabadi cuisine
  - East Indian cuisines
    - Bengali cuisine is a style of food preparation originating in Bengal, a region in eastern South Asia which is now divided between the Indian states of West Bengal, Tripura, and Barak Valley of Assam and the independent country of Bangladesh. Bengali food has inherited a large number of influences, both foreign and South Asian, arising from historical and strong trade links with many parts of the world.
    - Cuisine of Jharkhand
    - Oriya cuisine
  - North East Indian cuisines
    - Sikkimese cuisine
    - Assamese cuisine
    - Tripuri cuisine
    - Naga cuisine
    - Manipuri cuisine
    - Arunachalese cuisine
    - Meghalayan cuisine
  - West Indian cuisines
    - Maharashtrian cuisine
      - Malvani cuisine
      - East Indian Cuisine (East Indians are an ethnic group from Bombay in the West of India) The East Indian cuisine is distinct to the community and includes delicacies such as the vajri curry or goat tripe curry, chicken tope, sorpotel, khudi curries and many more.
    - Goan cuisine
    - Parsi cuisine
    - Gujarati cuisine
    - Rajasthani cuisine
  - Other Indian cuisines
    - Indian Chinese cuisine
    - Jain (Satvika)
    - Sindhi cuisine
    - Chettinad cuisine
    - Udupi cuisine
    - Indian fast food
    - Indian wine
- Maithil cuisine
- Maldivian cuisine
- Nepalese cuisine
  - Newari cuisine
- Pakistani cuisine
  - Balochi cuisine
  - Kashmiri cuisine
  - Pashtun cuisine
  - Muhajir cuisine
  - Punjabi cuisine
  - Lahori cuisine
  - Mughlai cuisine
  - Sindhi cuisine
- Sri Lankan cuisine
South Asian cuisine

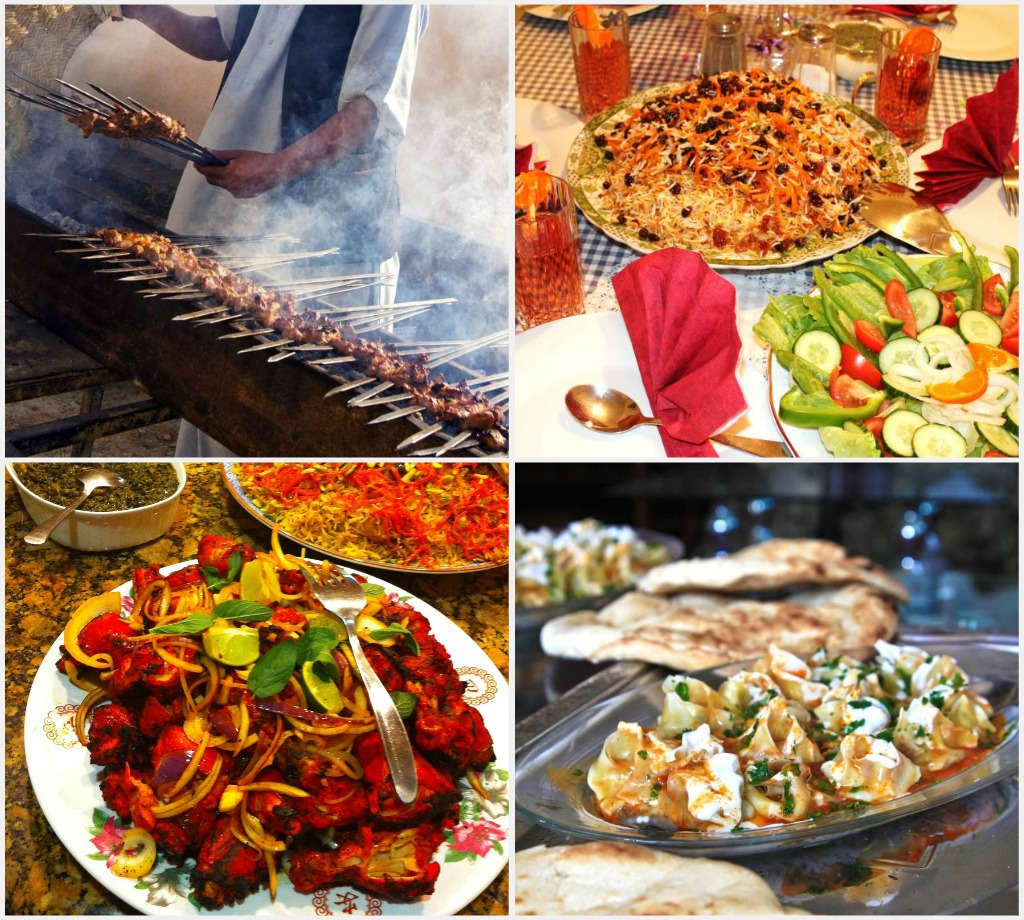
Some of the popular Afghan dishes, from left to right: 1. Lamb grilled kebab (seekh kabab); 2. Kabuli palaw and salad; 3. Tandoori chicken; and 4. Mantu (dumplings).

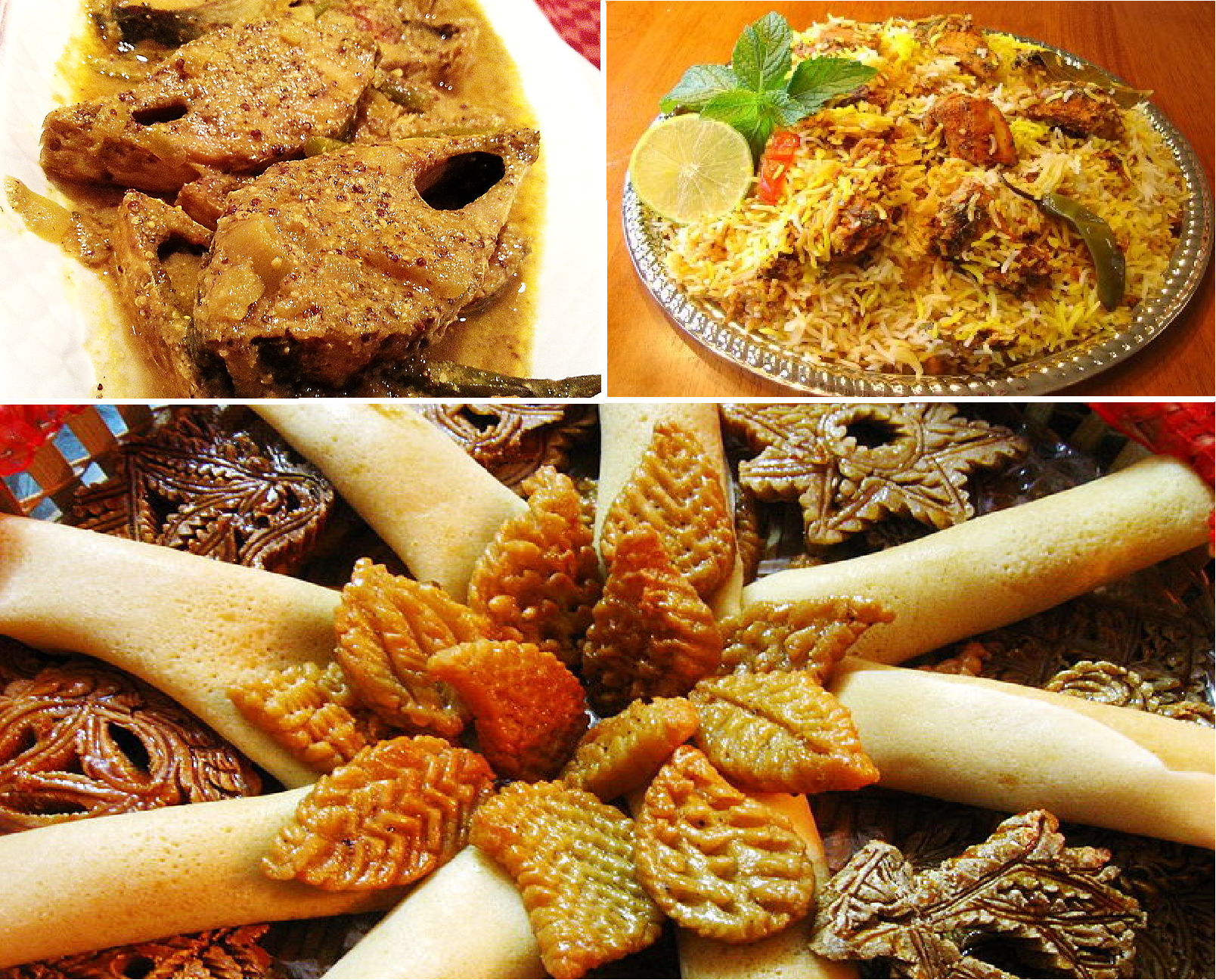
Traditional Bangladeshi meal: mustard seed ilish curry, Dhakai biryani and pitha; similar to East Indian cuisine.

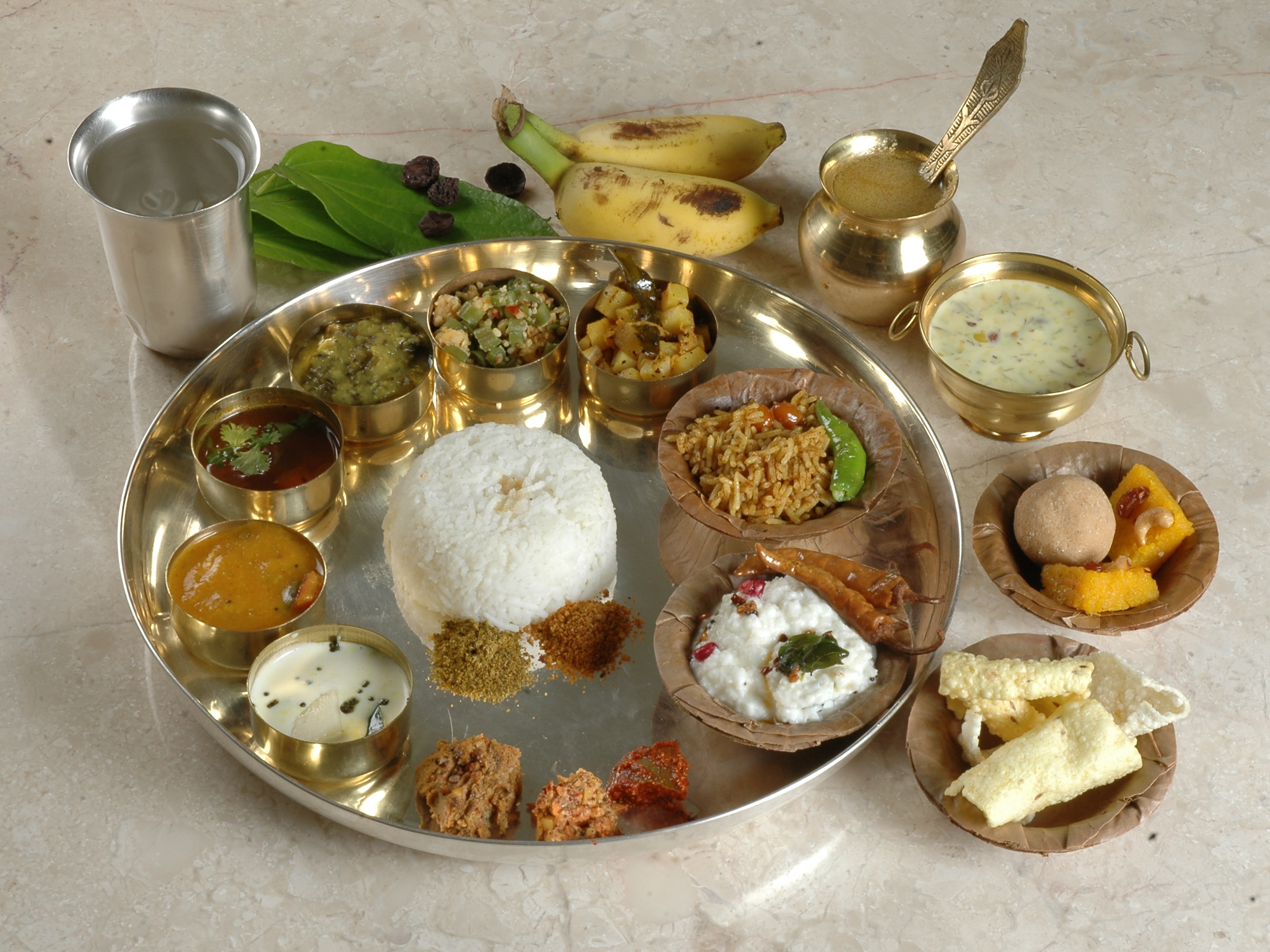
South Indian style vegetarian thali.

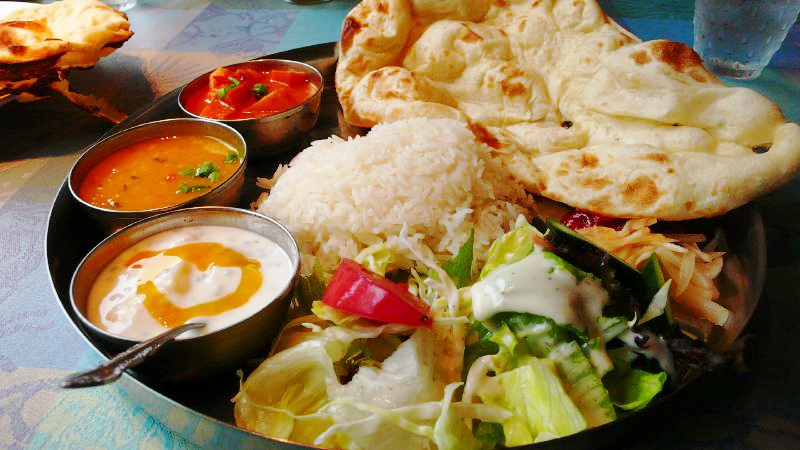
North Indian style vegetarian thali.

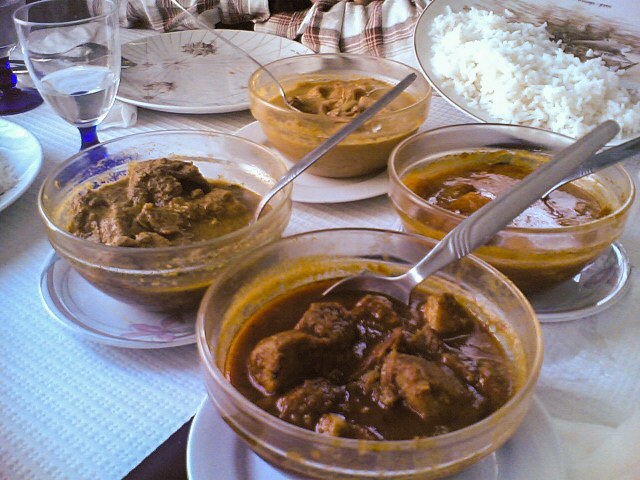
Pork vindaloo is a popular curry dish from the Indian state of Goa and around the world.

== Central Asian cuisine ==
Location of Central Asia. In some definitions, it also includes Afghanistan (south of area shown).

- Central Asian cuisine includes food from Kazakhstan, Kyrgyzstan, Tajikistan, Turkmenistan and Uzbekistan.
  - Bukharan Jewish cuisine – cuisine of the Bukharan Jews with great influence from Uzbek cuisine.
  - Kazakh cuisine – cuisine of Kazakhstan. Traditional Kazakh cuisine revolves around mutton and horse meat, as well as various milk products. For hundreds of years, Kazakhs were herders who raised fat-tailed sheep, Bactrian camels, and horses, relying on these animals for transportation, clothing, and food.
    - Kazakh wine
  - Koryo-saram cuisine – cuisine of the Koryo-saram, descended from Korean cuisine and influenced by the cuisines of the former Soviet Union.
  - Kyrgyz cuisine – originating in Kyrgyzstan, is similar in many respects to that of its neighbors, particularly Kazakh cuisine. Traditional Kyrgyz food includes mutton and horse meat, as well as milk products. The cooking techniques and major ingredients have been strongly influenced by the nation's nomadic way of life.
  - Tajik cuisine – traditional cuisine of Tajikistan, has much in common with Afghan, Russian, and Uzbek cuisines. Plov, also called osh, is the national dish in Tajikistan, as in other countries in the region. It consists of chunks of mutton, carrots and rice fried in a large cast-iron cauldron similar to a Dutch oven. Green tea is the national drink. Traditional Tajik meals start with a spread of dried fruit, nuts, halva, and other sweets arrayed on the table in small dishes, and then progress to soup and meat, before finishing with plov.
  - Turkmen cuisine – cuisine of Turkmenistan. It is similar to that of the rest of Central Asia. Plov is the staple, everyday food, which is also served at celebrations. Turkmenistan is perhaps most famous for its melons, especially in the former Soviet Union, where it was once the major supplier. Meals are almost always served with naan, Central Asian flat bread, known locally as "çörek".
  - Uzbek cuisine – cuisine influenced by local agriculture, as in most nations. There is a great deal of grain farming in Uzbekistan, so bread and noodles are of importance, and Uzbek cuisine has been characterized as "noodle-rich". Mutton is a popular variety of meat due to the abundance of sheep in the country and it is a part of various Uzbek dishes. Uzbekistan's signature dish is palov (osh) made with rice, pieces of meat, grated carrots and onions.
Central Asian cuisine

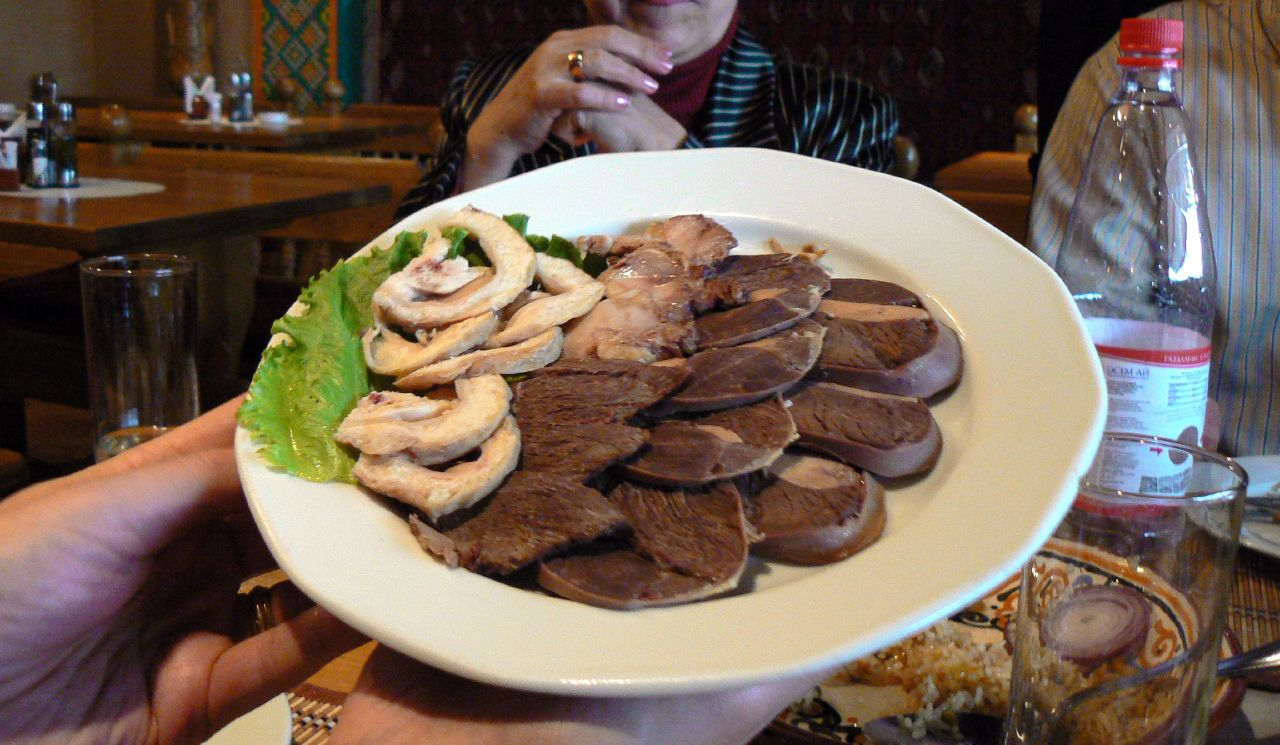
Horse meat platter. Kazakh cuisine revolves around mutton, horse meat and various milk products.

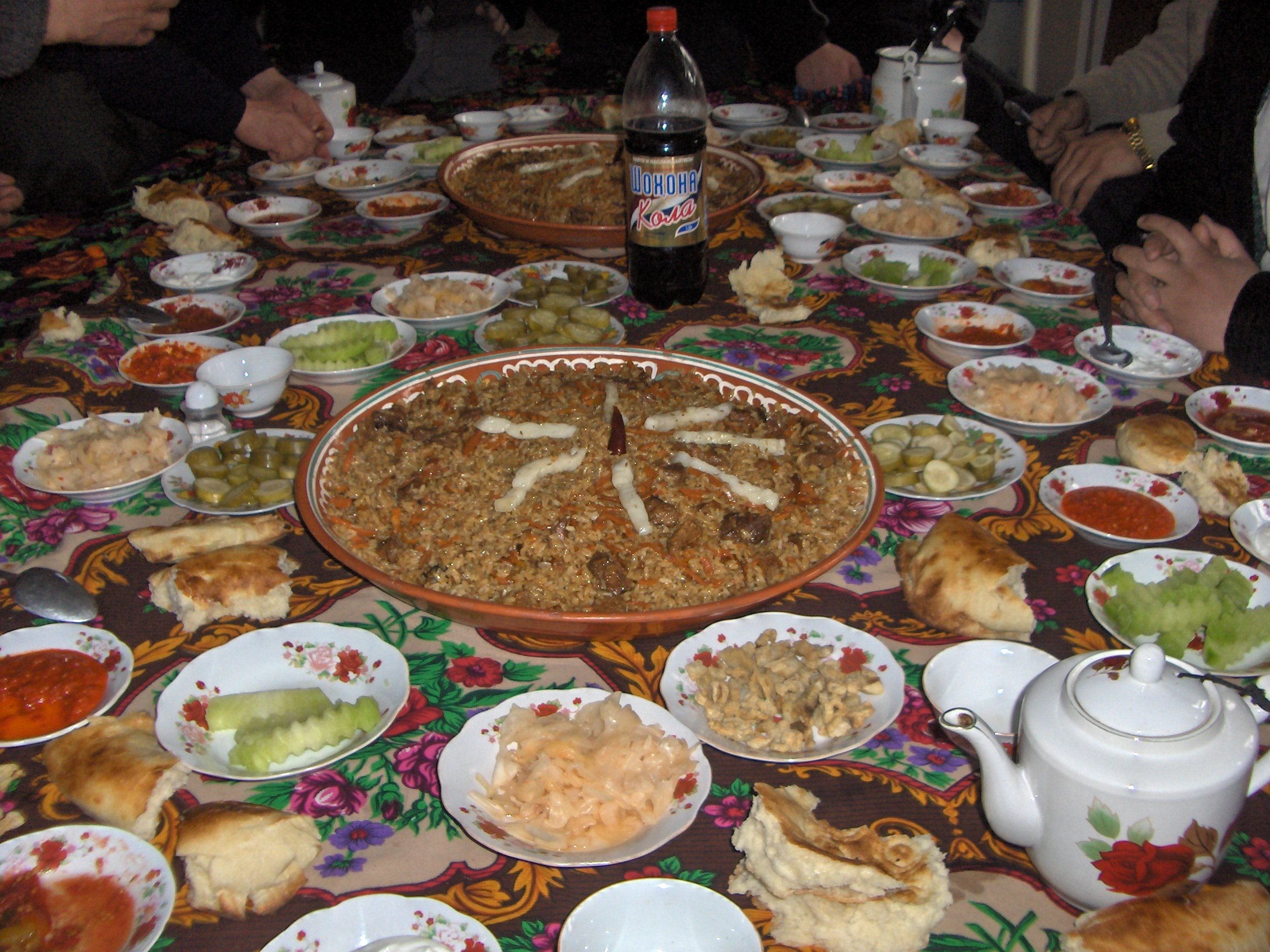
A Tajik feast

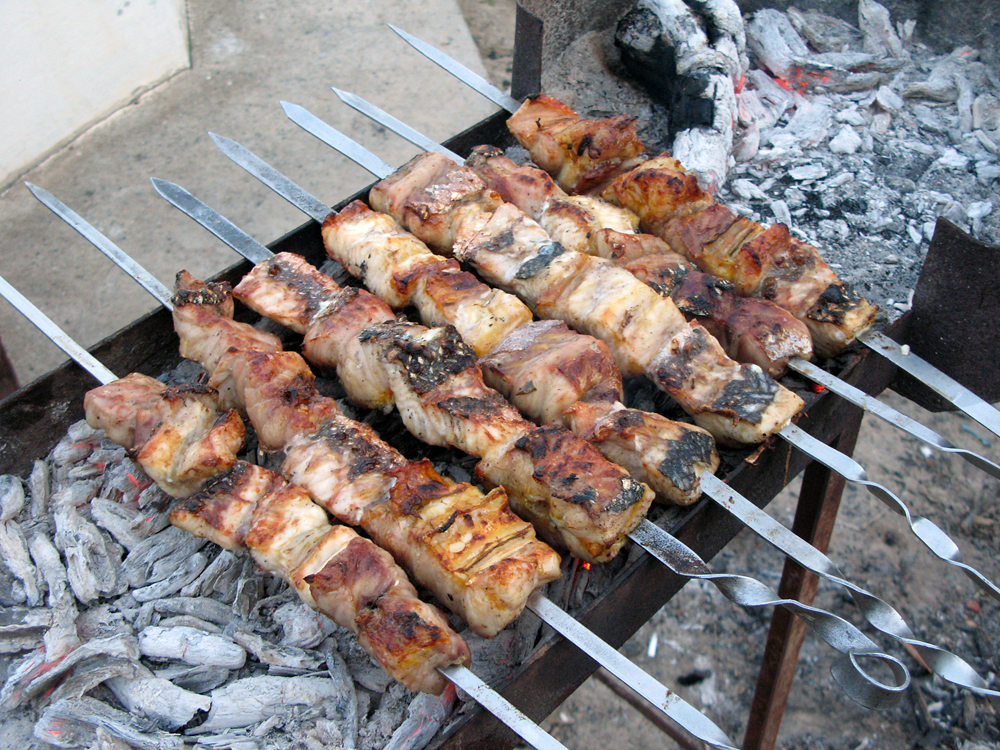
Sturgeon kebabs cooking in Turkmenistan

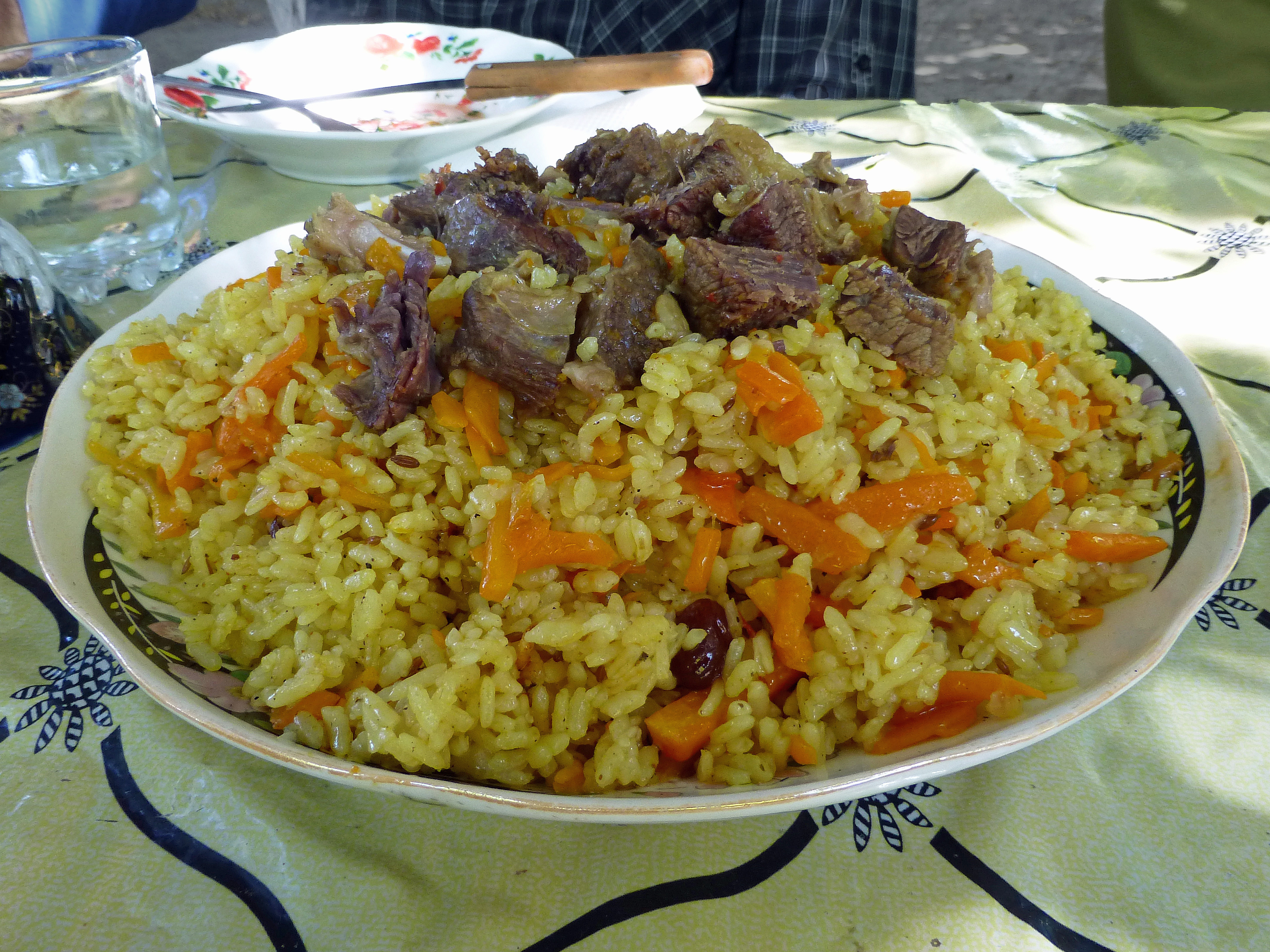
Uzbek plov

== West Asian cuisine ==
Location of West Asia.

- West Asian cuisine, is the cuisine of the various countries and peoples of West Asia. Despite their similarities, there are considerable differences in climate and culture, so the term is not definitive. The cuisine of the region is diverse while having a degree of homogeneity. Many West Asian dishes are made with a paste called tahini. Tahini is a sesame paste made with hulled seeds, unlike its East Asian counterpart. It is used to make such popular meze, or appetizers, as baba ghanoush and hummus along with pungent dipping sauces served with falafel, keftes or kofta and vegetables. Hummus is made from chickpeas, which are staples of the diet. Some commonly used ingredients include olives and olive oil, lamb, pitas, honey, sesame seeds, dates, sumac, chickpeas, mint and parsley. Some popular dishes include kibbeh and shawarma.
  - Arab cuisine of the Persian Gulf - Arab cuisine of the Persian Gulf today is the result of combination of diverse cuisines, incorporating Levantine, Indian, Chinese, and Persian cooking styles, and many items not originally indigenous to the Persian Gulf region, which were most probably imported on the dhows and the caravans.
  - Assyrian cuisine
  - Bahraini cuisine refers to the cuisine of The Kingdom of Bahrain, a small island state near the western shores of the Persian Gulf. Bahrain produces only a small amount of its food requirements due to limited land space, and imports much of its food. Its primary crops are dates, bananas, citrus fruits, pomegranates, mangoes, cucumbers and tomatoes.
  - Cypriot cuisine
  - Egyptian cuisine
  - Emirati cuisine
  - Iranian cuisine - Persian cuisine is diverse, with each province featuring dishes, culinary traditions and styles distinct to its region.
    - Abgoosht is an Iranian stew usually made with lamb and vegetables
    - Caspian cuisine
  - Iraqi cuisine or Mesopotamian cuisine, has a long history going back some 10,000 years - to the Sumerians, Babylonians and Assyrians. Tablets found in ancient ruins in Iraq show recipes prepared in the temples during religious festivals - the first cookbooks in the world.
    - Kurdish cuisine consists of a wide variety of foods prepared by the Kurdish people that have got many traditions from their homeland, Kurdistan.
  - Kuwaiti cuisine - the national dish of Kuwait known as machboos (Arabic: مكبوس) consists mainly of mutton or chicken placed over or mixed in a large mass of well-cooked and prepared rice.
  - Mizrahi Jewish cuisine is based largely on fresh ingredients, as marketing was done in the local souq.
  - Omani cuisine is generally very simple, with the aid of many spices and marinades to complete a dish, which usually consists of chicken, fish, and mutton. Unlike many other Asian nations, Omani cuisine is not spicy, and varies between regions.
  - Qatari cuisine
  - Saudi Arabian cuisine - Food staples include lamb, grilled chicken, falafel (deep-fried chickpea balls), shawarma (spit-cooked sliced lamb), mutabbaq and Ful medames. Arabic unleavened bread, or khobz (خبز), is eaten with almost all meals, and is often used as an edible utensil to scoop foods.
    - Kabsa is considered by many as Saudi Arabia's national dish.
  - Turkish cuisine is largely the heritage of Ottoman cuisine, which can be described as a fusion and refinement of Central Asian, West Asian and Balkan cuisines. Turkish cuisine has in turn influenced those and other neighboring cuisines, including that of western Europe.
    - Pontic Greek cuisine
    - Turkish wine
  - Yemeni cuisine - The most common Yemeni dishes include: Aseed, Bint Al-Sahn, Fahsa, Fatoot, Fattah, Ful medames, Hareesh, Jachnun, Kabsa, Karees, Komroh, Mandi, Mateet, Mutabbaq, Saltah, Samak Mofa, Shafut, Shakshouka, Thareed, and Zoam.
    - Mandi is a traditional Yemeni dish usually made from meat (lamb or chicken), basmati rice, and a mixture of spices.
  - Levantine cuisine – traditional cuisine of Ottoman Syria, now usually called the Levant, known in Arabic as the Bilad ash-Sham. This region shared many culinary traditions under the Ottoman Empire which continue to be influential today. It covers the modern states of Syria, Palestine, Lebanon, Jordan, Israel, Northern Iraq, northwest Iraq (the province of Mosul), and parts of southern Turkey near Adana, Gaziantep, Antakya and Mardin.
    - Palestinian cuisine consists of foods from or commonly eaten by Palestinians, whether in Palestine, Israel, Jordan, refugee camps in nearby countries, or by the Palestinian diaspora.
    - Israeli cuisine comprises a mixture of dishes—from those brought back to Israel by Jews from the Diaspora, those from Jews who remained in the region, and those adopted from surrounding Arab inhabitants. Since before the establishment of the modern State of Israel in 1948, and particularly since the late 1970s, an Israeli fusion cuisine has developed.
      - Ancient Israelite cuisine
      - Israeli wine
      - Ptitim – Israeli toasted pasta shaped like rice or little balls.
    - Jordanian cuisine
    - Lebanese cuisine includes an abundance of starches, fruits, vegetables, fresh fish and seafood; animal fats are consumed sparingly. Poultry is eaten more often than red meat, and when red meat is eaten it is usually lamb on the coast and goat meat in the mountain regions.
      - Lebanese wine
    - Syrian cuisine is a diffusion of the cultures of civilizations that settled in Syria, particularly during and after the Islamic era beginning with the Arab Umayyad conquest, then the eventual Persian-influenced Abbasids and ending with the strong influences of Turkish cuisine, resulting from the coming of the Ottoman Turks.
    - Syrian Jewish cuisine
- South Caucasus cuisine is the cuisine of the various countries and peoples of the South Caucasus, also known as Transcaucasia.
  - Armenian cuisine
  - Azerbaijani cuisine
  - Georgian cuisine
    - Ossetian cuisine
West Asian foods and dishes

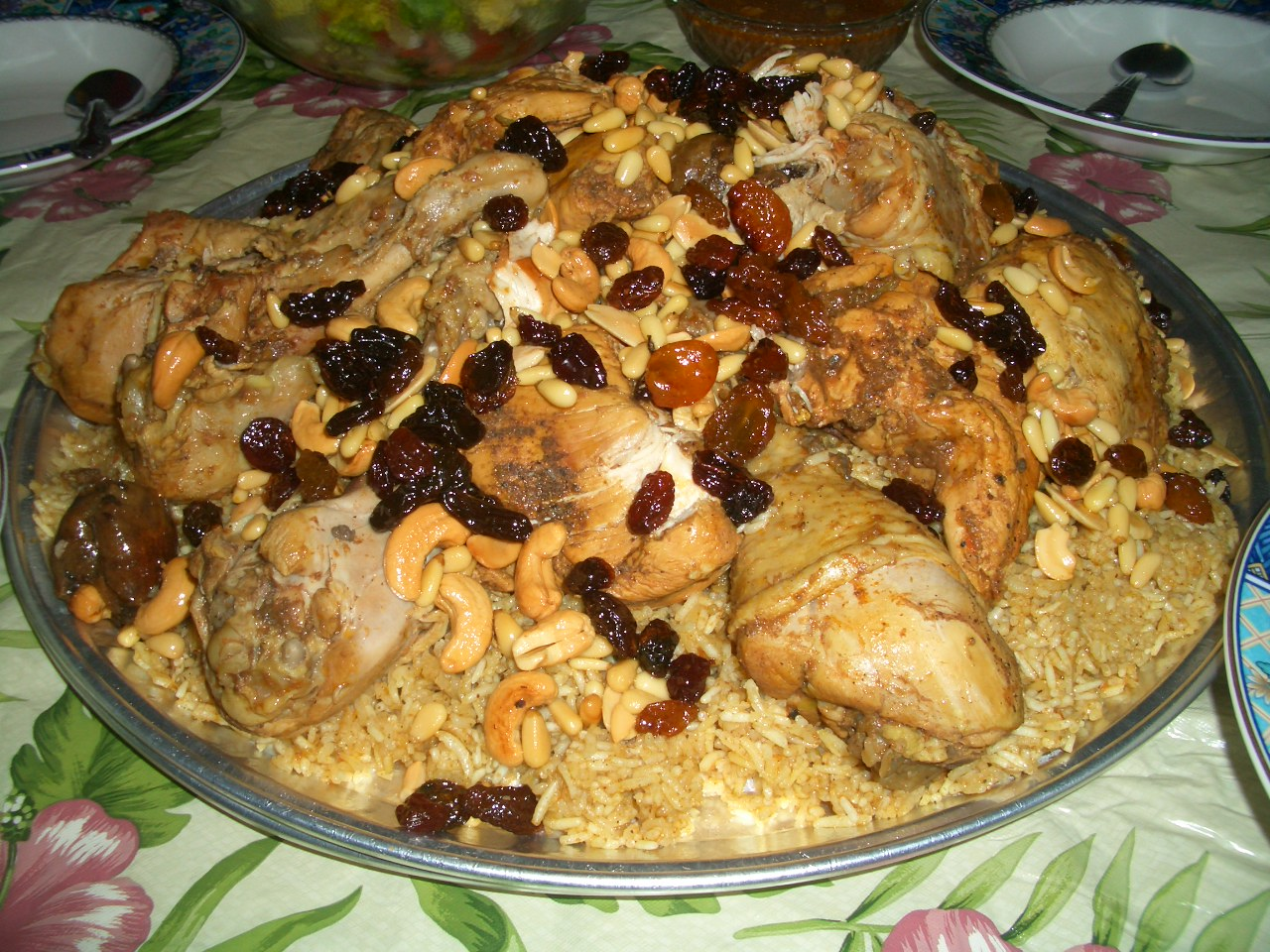
Kabsa is a traditional Yemeni dish.

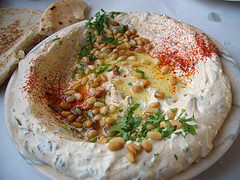
Hummus with pine nuts at the Maxim restaurant in Haifa, Israel.

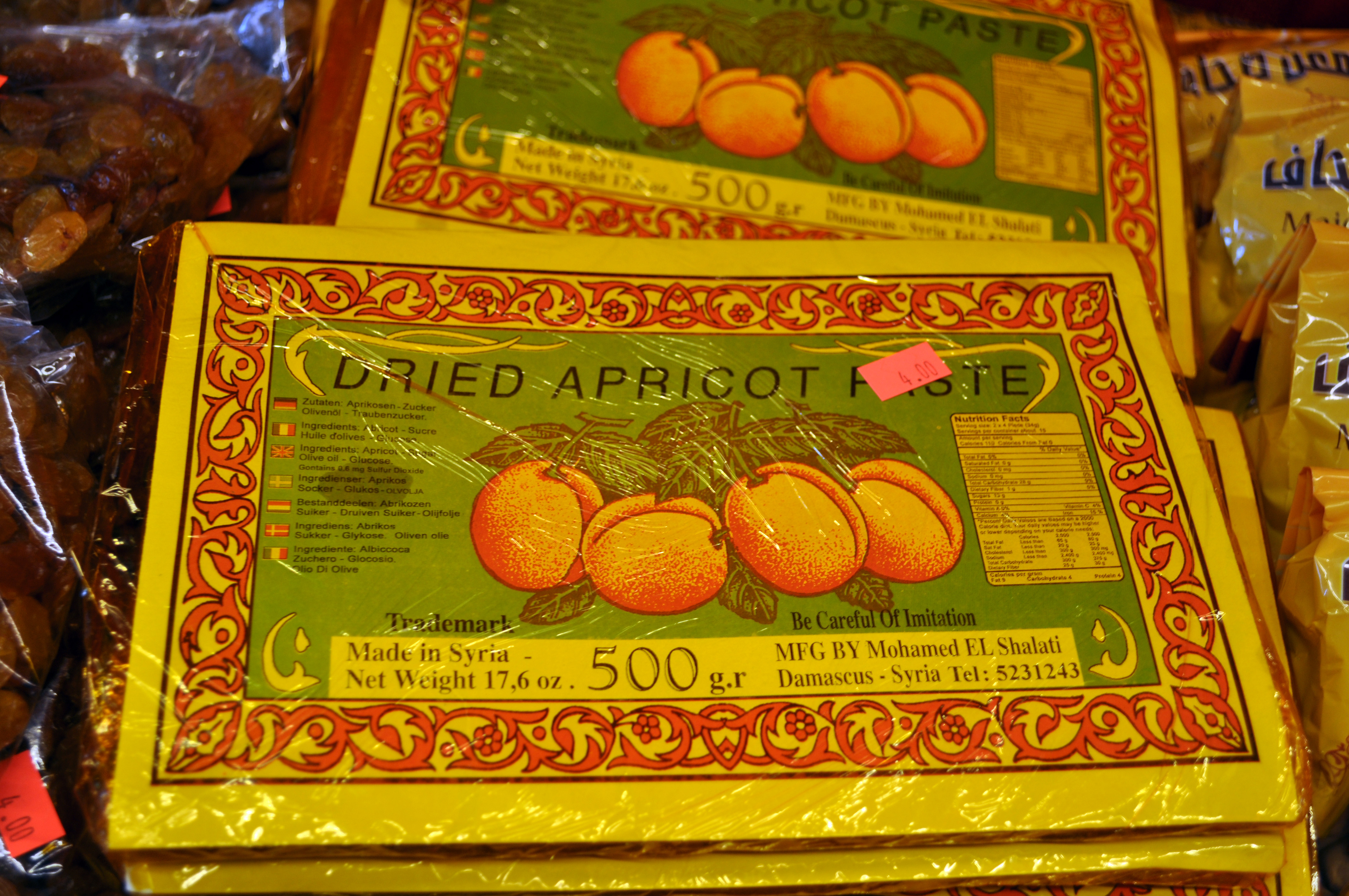
Syrians are renowned for producing dried apricot paste

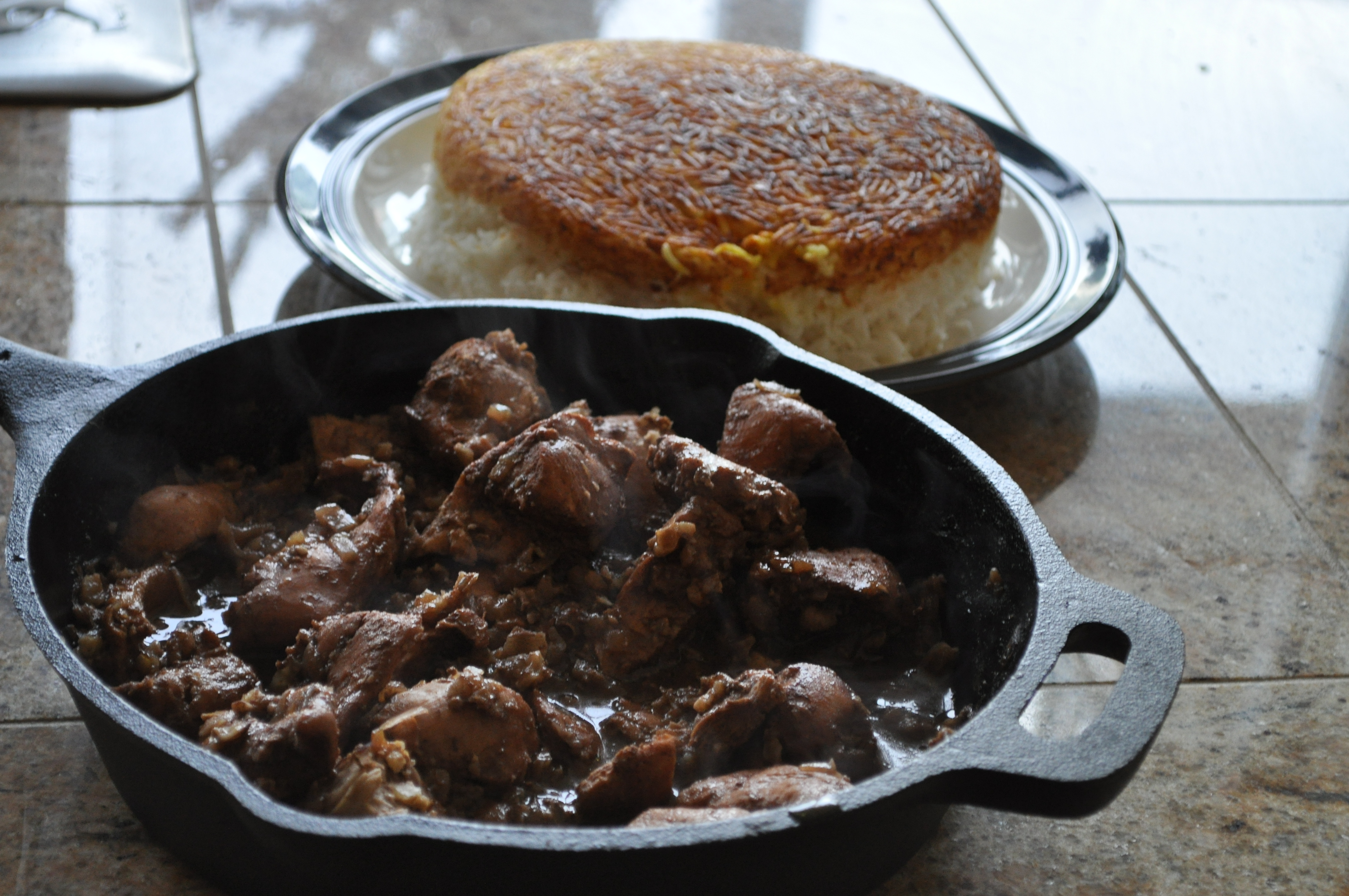
Chicken Fesenjān with Persian rice, an Iranian dish

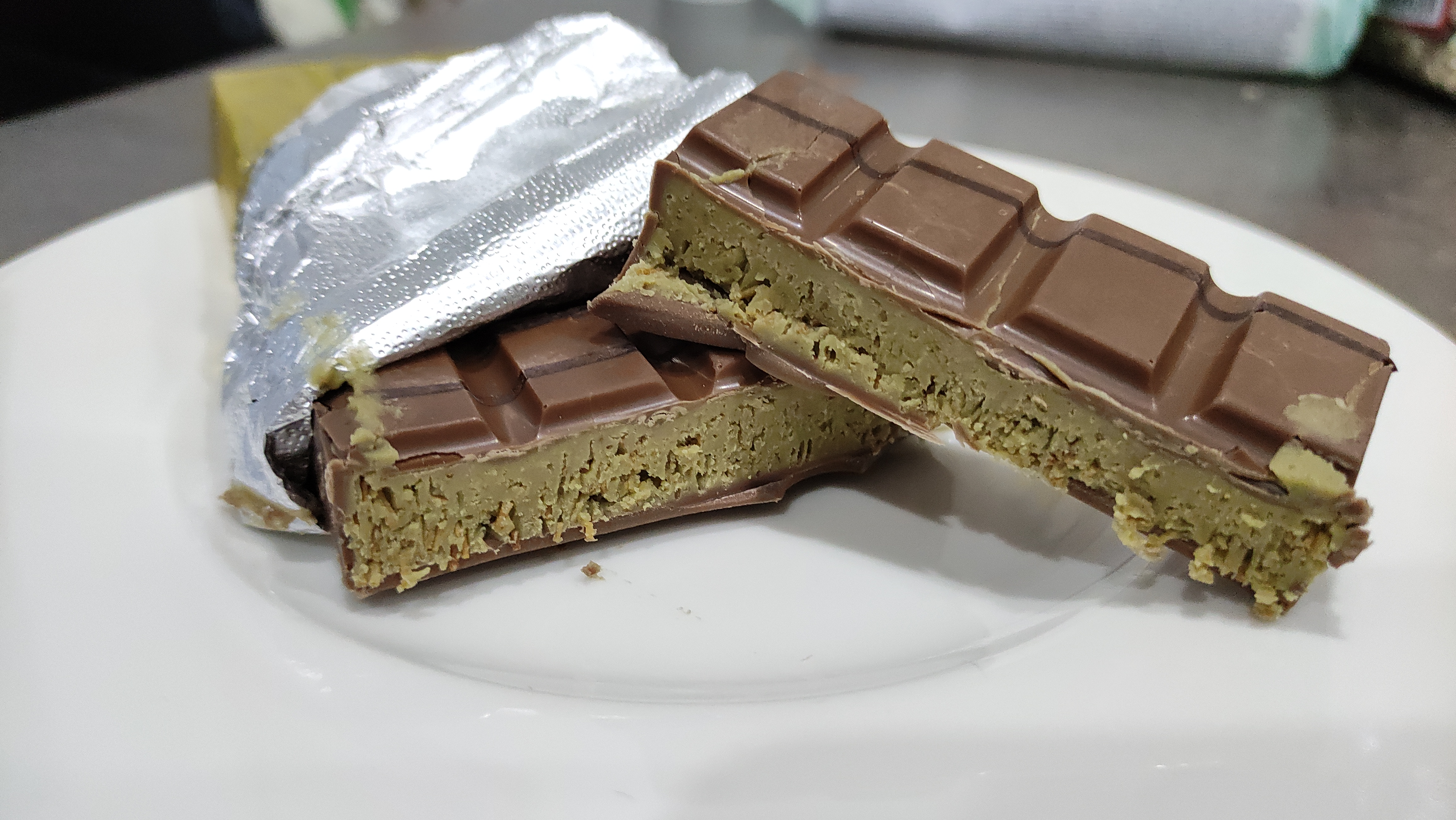
Dubai chocolate is a popular Emirati style of chocolate bar filled with kadayif and pistachio-tahini cream.

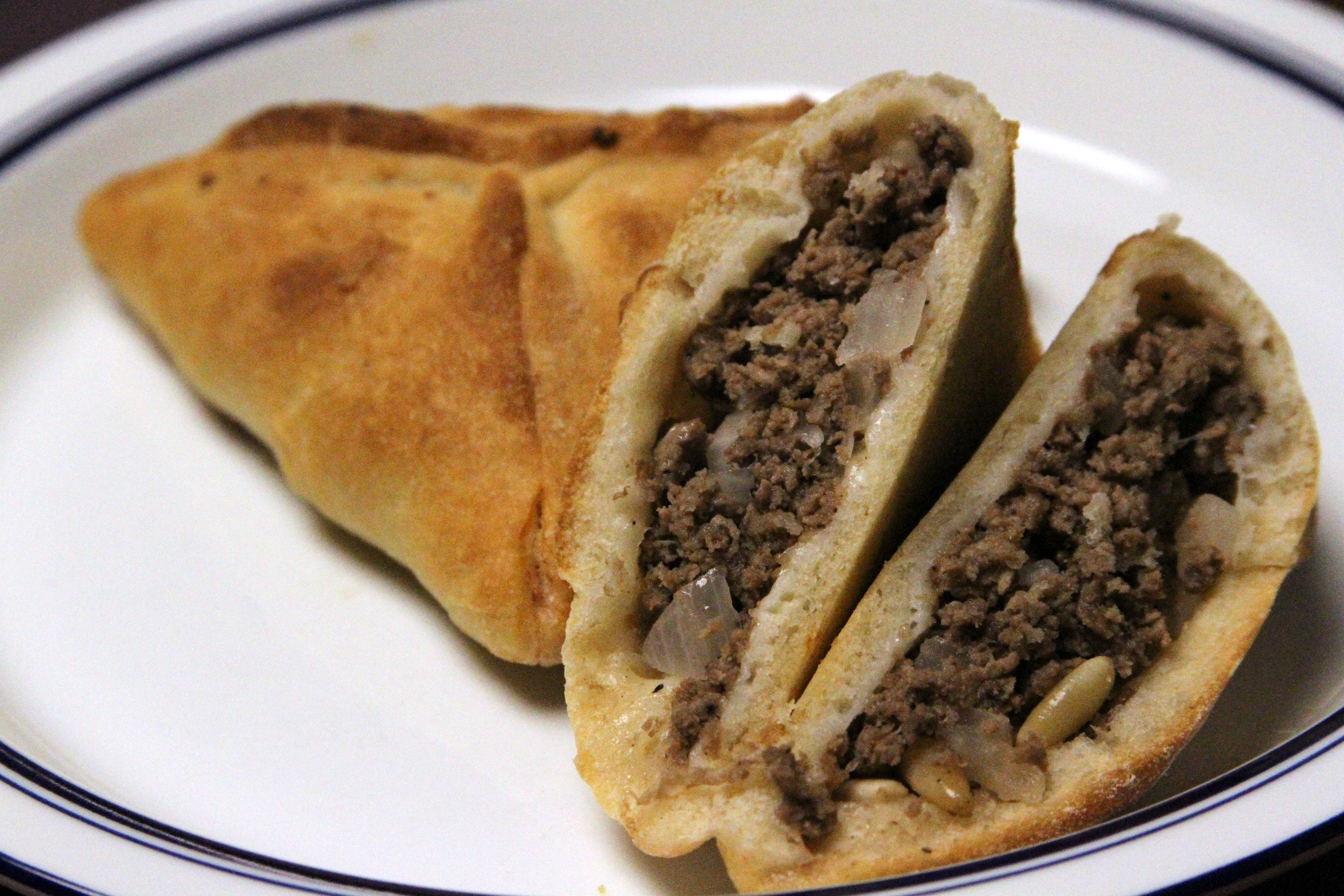
Fatayer is a meat pie or pastry that can alternatively be stuffed with spinach (sabaneq), or cheese (jibnah). It is eaten in Turkey, Syria, Lebanon, Jordan and other countries in West Asia.

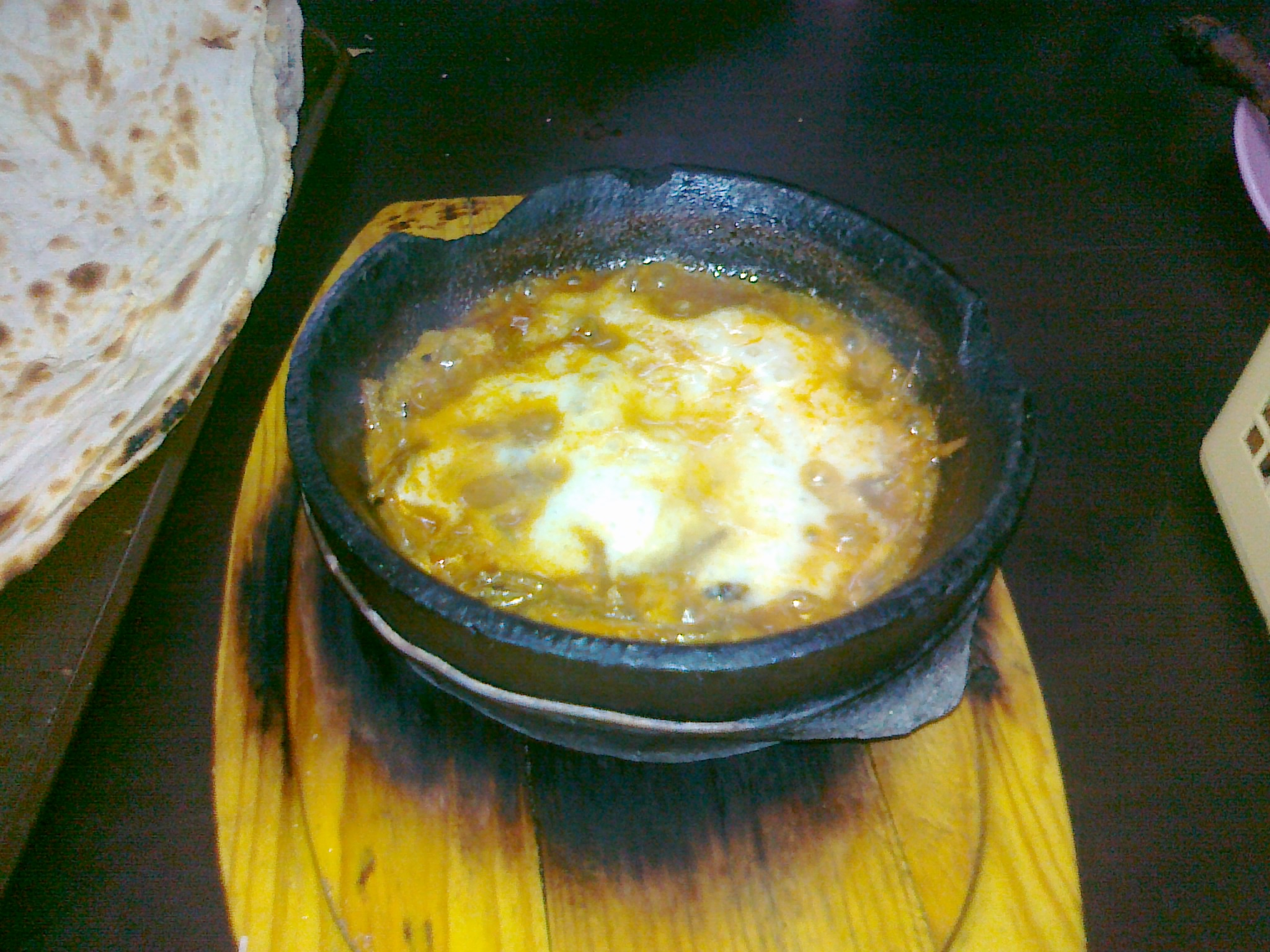
Fahsa is a famous Yemeni dish, containing beef or lamb meat cooked in a stony pot called Madara.

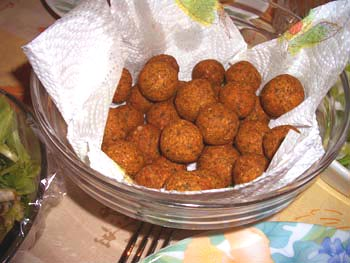
Falafel balls

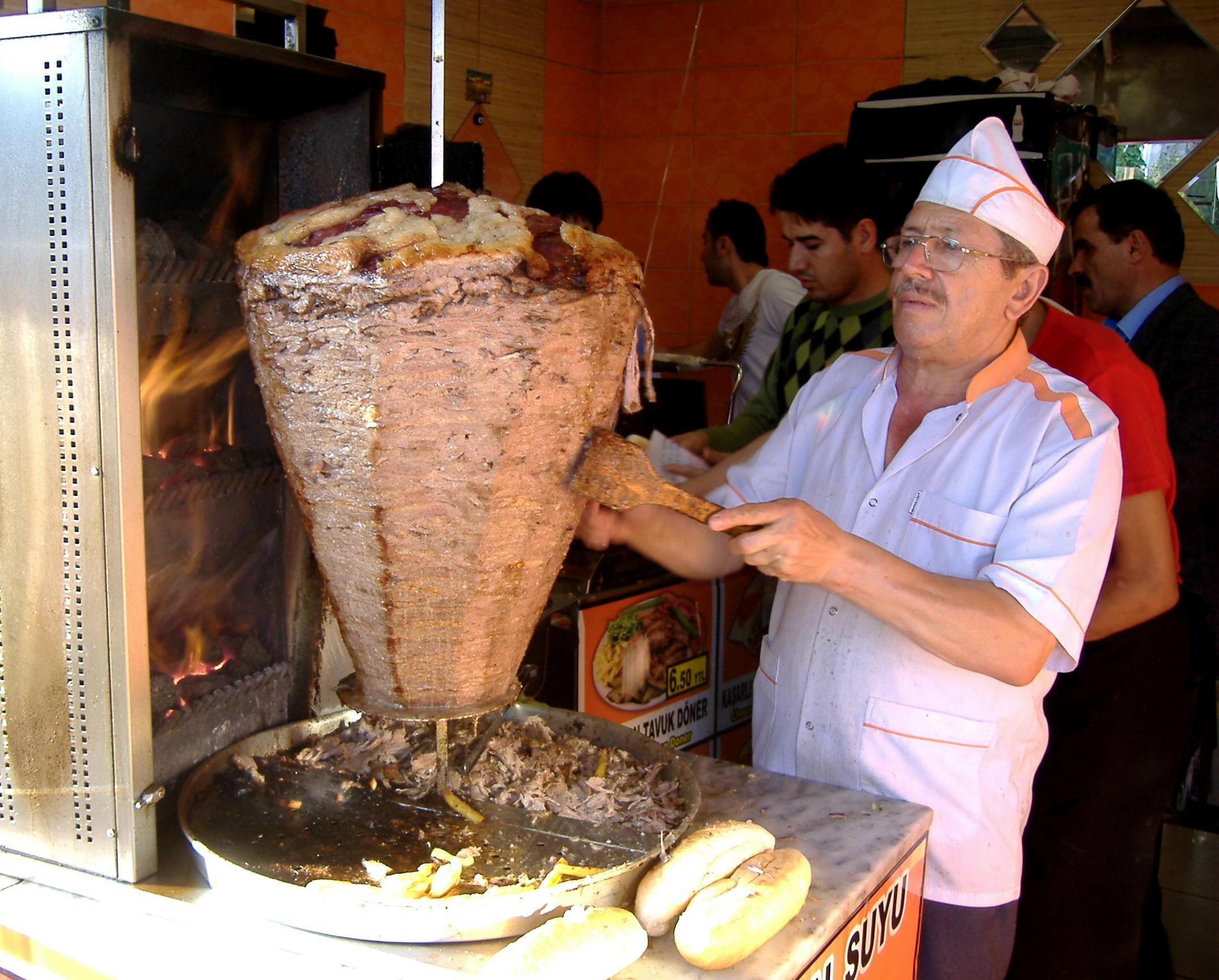
Doner kebab, Istanbul, Turkey

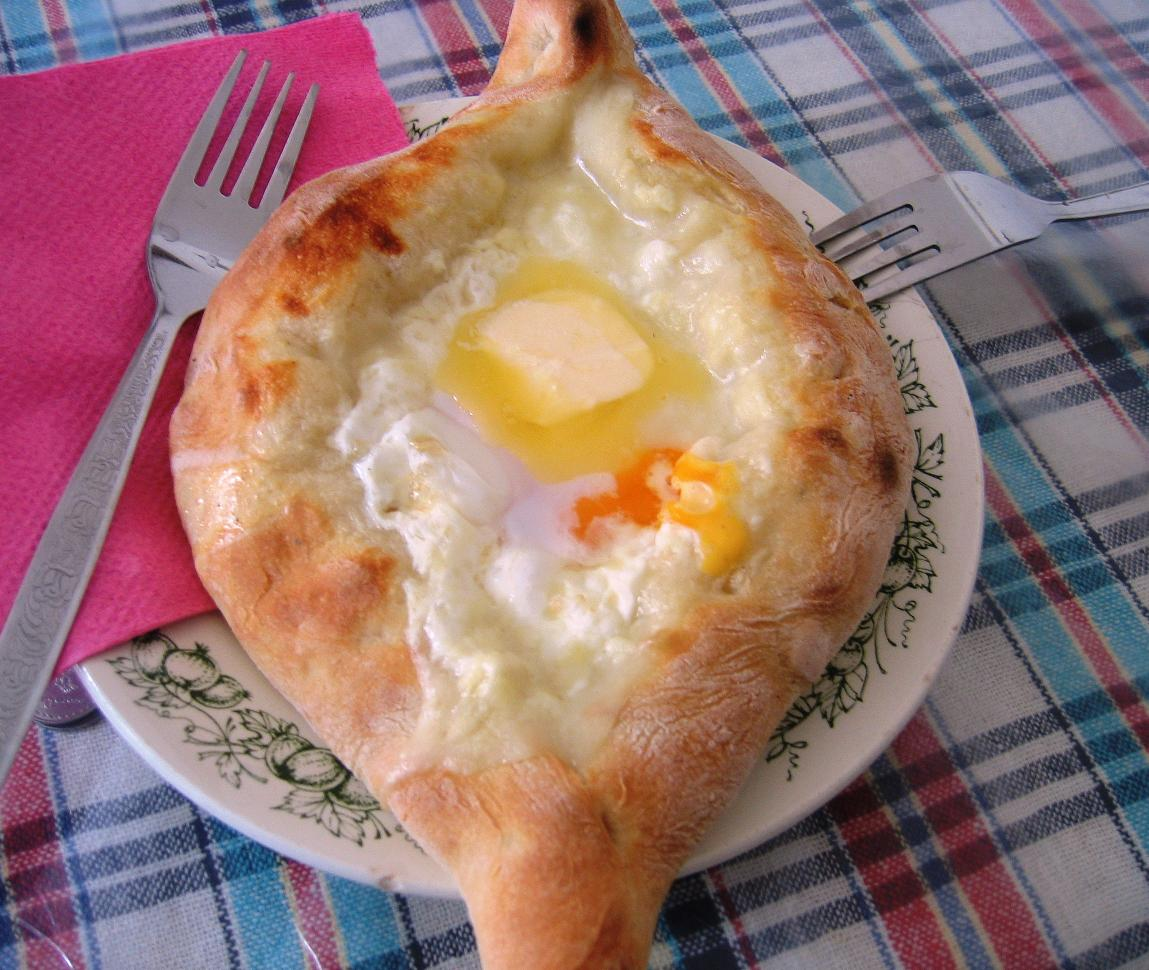
Adjarian Khachapuri from Georgia

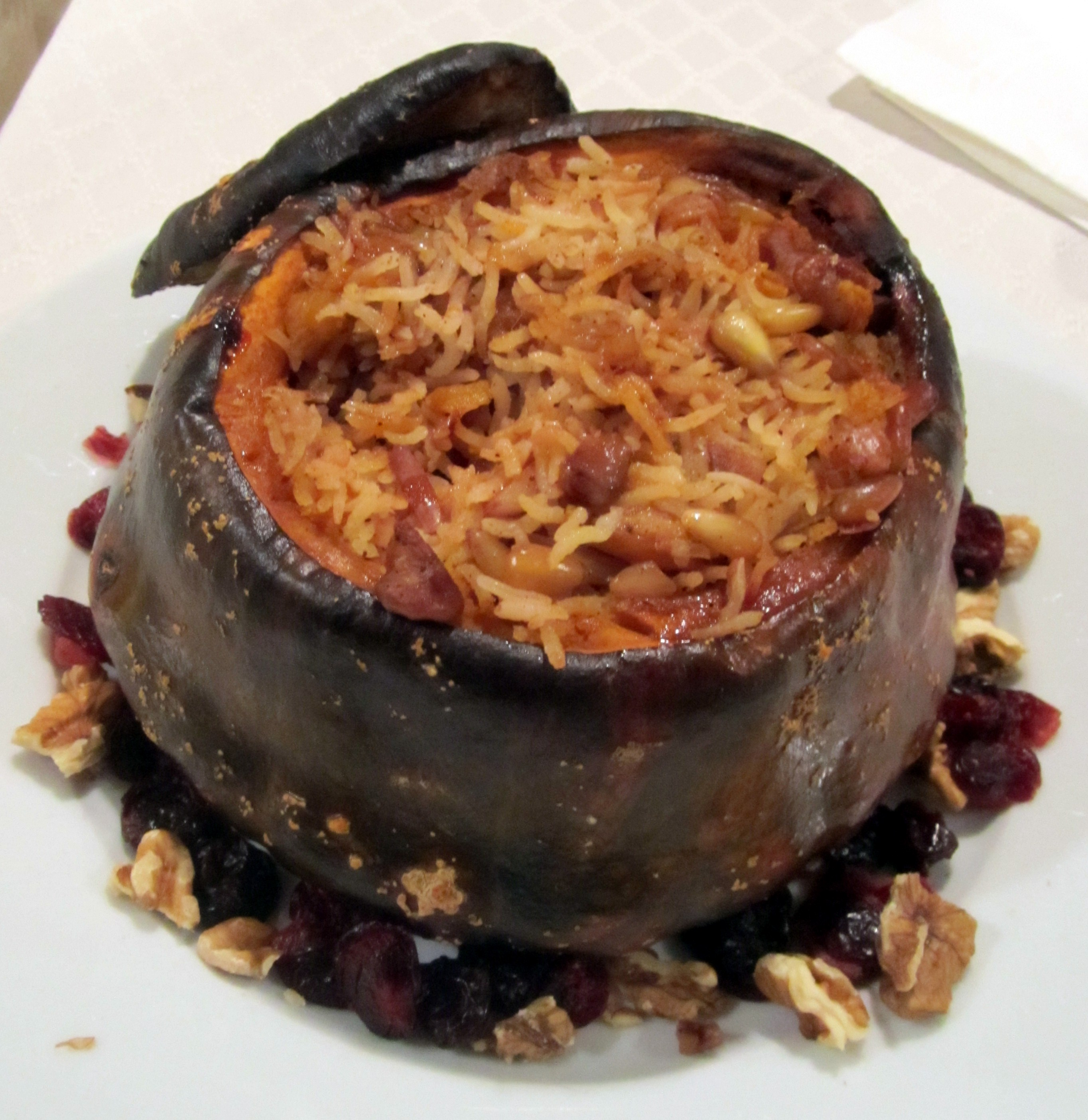
Armenian Ghapama made with butternut squash, instead of pumpkin

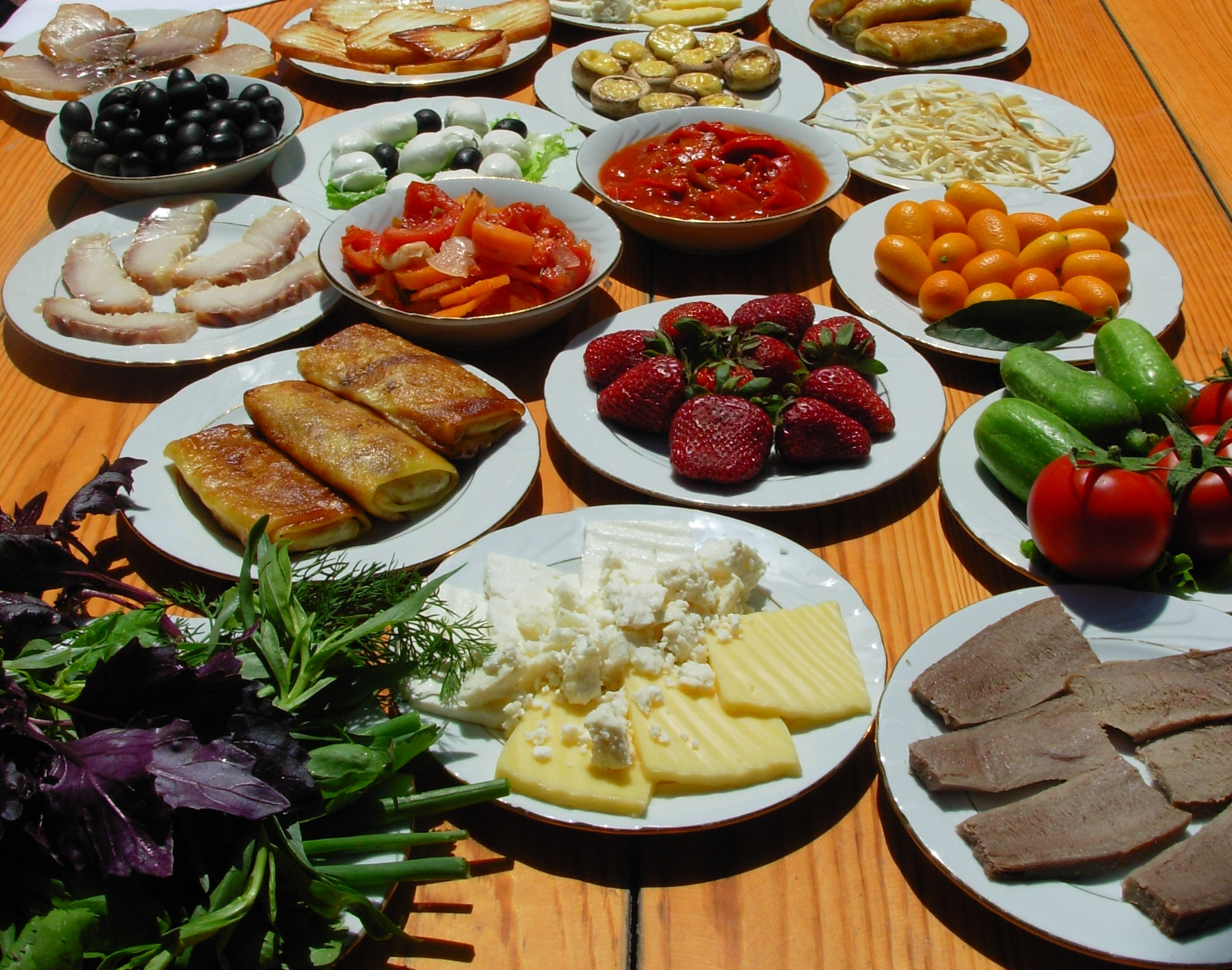
Light snacks of Azerbaijani cuisine

== North Asian cuisine ==
Location of North Asia.

North Asian cuisine includes the cuisines of the people from North Asia. It mostly consists of the culinary traditions of the ethnic groups and indigenous people who live in the Asian part of the Russian Federation. Those cuisines have characteristics of Turkic and Mongolian cuisines.

- Russian cuisine
  - Buryat cuisine
  - Chukchi cuisine
  - Cuisine of Commander Islands
  - Sakha cuisine
  - Sakhalin Korean cuisine
  - Tuvan cuisine
  - Yamal cuisine
  - Yup'ik cuisine

== See also ==
- Asian cuisine
- Eastern Arabian cuisine
- Fusion cuisine
- List of cuisines
- List of dishes from the Caucasus
- Mediterranean cuisine
