= List of cuisines =

A cuisine is a specific set of cooking traditions and practices, often associated with a specific culture or region. Each cuisine involves food preparation in a particular style, of food and drink of particular types, to produce individually consumed items or distinct meals. A cuisine is frequently named after the region or place where it originated. A cuisine is primarily influenced by the ingredients that are available locally or through trade. Religious food laws can also exercise a strong influence on such culinary practices.

== Regional and ethnic cuisines ==
Global cuisine is a cuisine that is practiced around the world. A cuisine is a characteristic style of cooking practices and traditions, often associated with a specific region, country or culture. To become a global cuisine, a local, regional or national cuisine must spread around the world with its food served worldwide.

Regional cuisine is based upon national, state or local regions. Regional cuisines may vary based upon food availability and trade, varying climates, cooking traditions and practices, and cultural differences. One noteworthy definition is based upon traditional cuisine: "A traditional cuisine is a coherent tradition of food preparation that rises from the daily lives and kitchens of a people over an extended period in a specific region of a country, or a specific country, and which, when localized, has notable distinctions from the cuisine of the country as a whole."

=== African cuisine ===
==== Central African cuisine ====
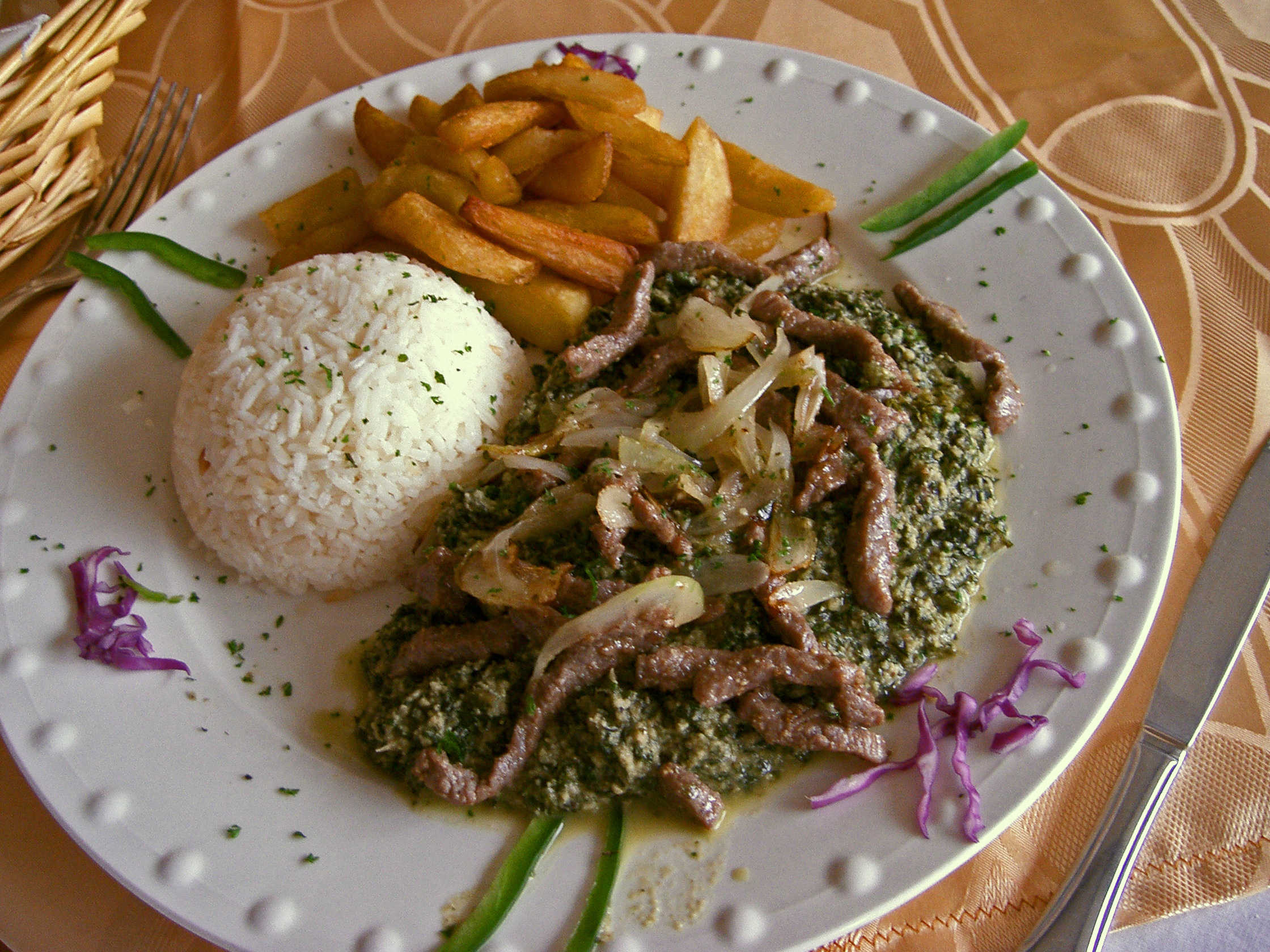
Ndolé, the national dish of Cameroon

- Angolan cuisine
- Cameroonian cuisine
- Chadian cuisine
- Congolese cuisine
- Centrafrican cuisine
- Equatorial Guinea cuisine
- Gabonese cuisine
- Santomean cuisine

==== East African cuisine ====
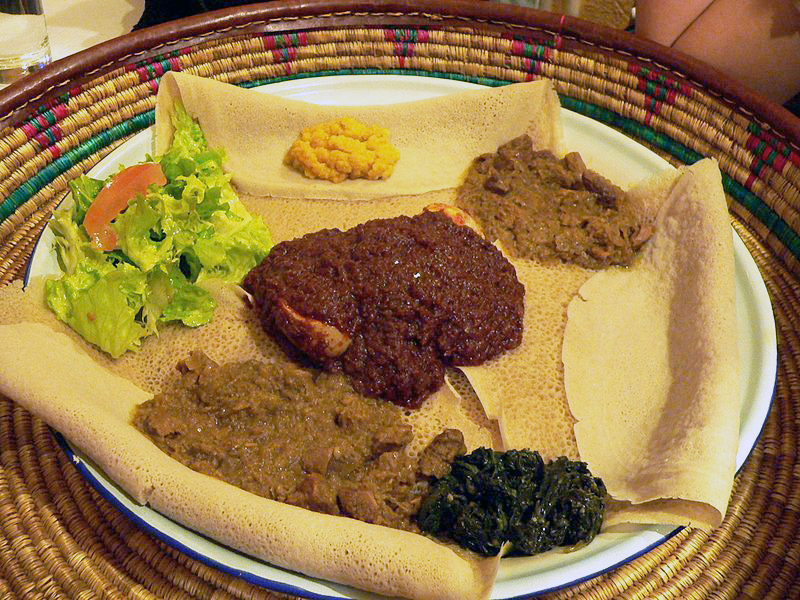
Meal consisting of injera and several kinds of wat or tsebhi (stew), typical of Ethiopian cuisine

- Burundian cuisine
- Comorian cuisine
- Djiboutian cuisine
- Eritrean cuisine
- Ethiopian cuisine
  - Ethiopian Jewish cuisine
- Kenyan cuisine
- Maasai cuisine
- Malagasy cuisine
- Malawian cuisine
- Mauritian cuisine
- Mozambican cuisine
- Rwandan cuisine
- Seychellois cuisine
- Somali cuisine
- Sudanese cuisine
- South Sudanese cuisine
- Tanzanian cuisine
  - Zanzibari cuisine
- Ugandan cuisine
- Zambian cuisine
- Zimbabwean cuisine

==== North African cuisine ====
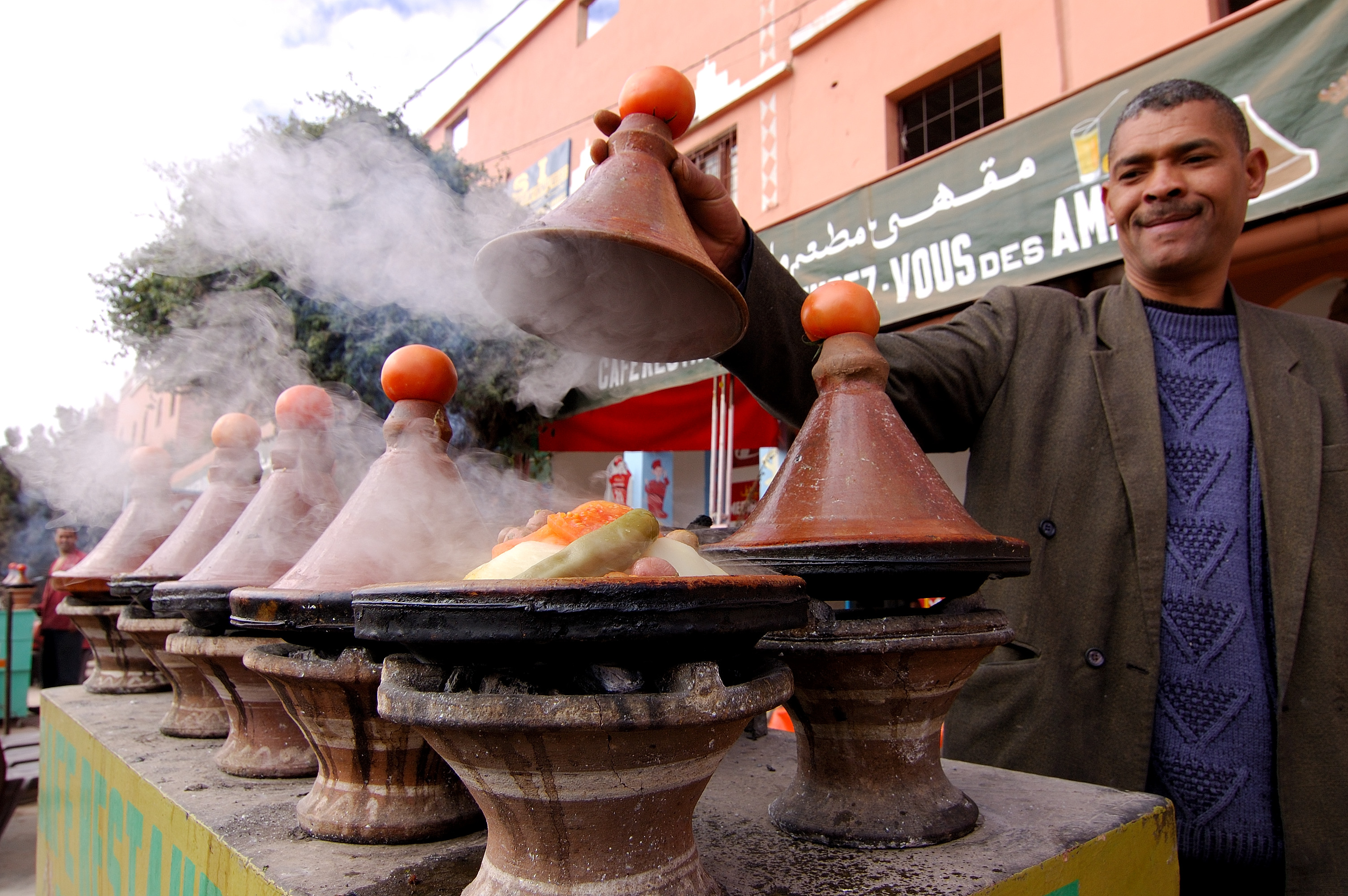
Cooking tajine, a typical North African dish

- Algerian cuisine
- Berber cuisine
- Egyptian cuisine
- Libyan cuisine
- Moroccan cuisine
- Tunisian cuisine
- Western Saharan cuisine

==== Southern African cuisine ====
- Botswana cuisine
- Eswatini cuisine
- Lesotho cuisine
- Namibian cuisine
- South African cuisine
  - Afrikaner cuisine

==== West African cuisine ====
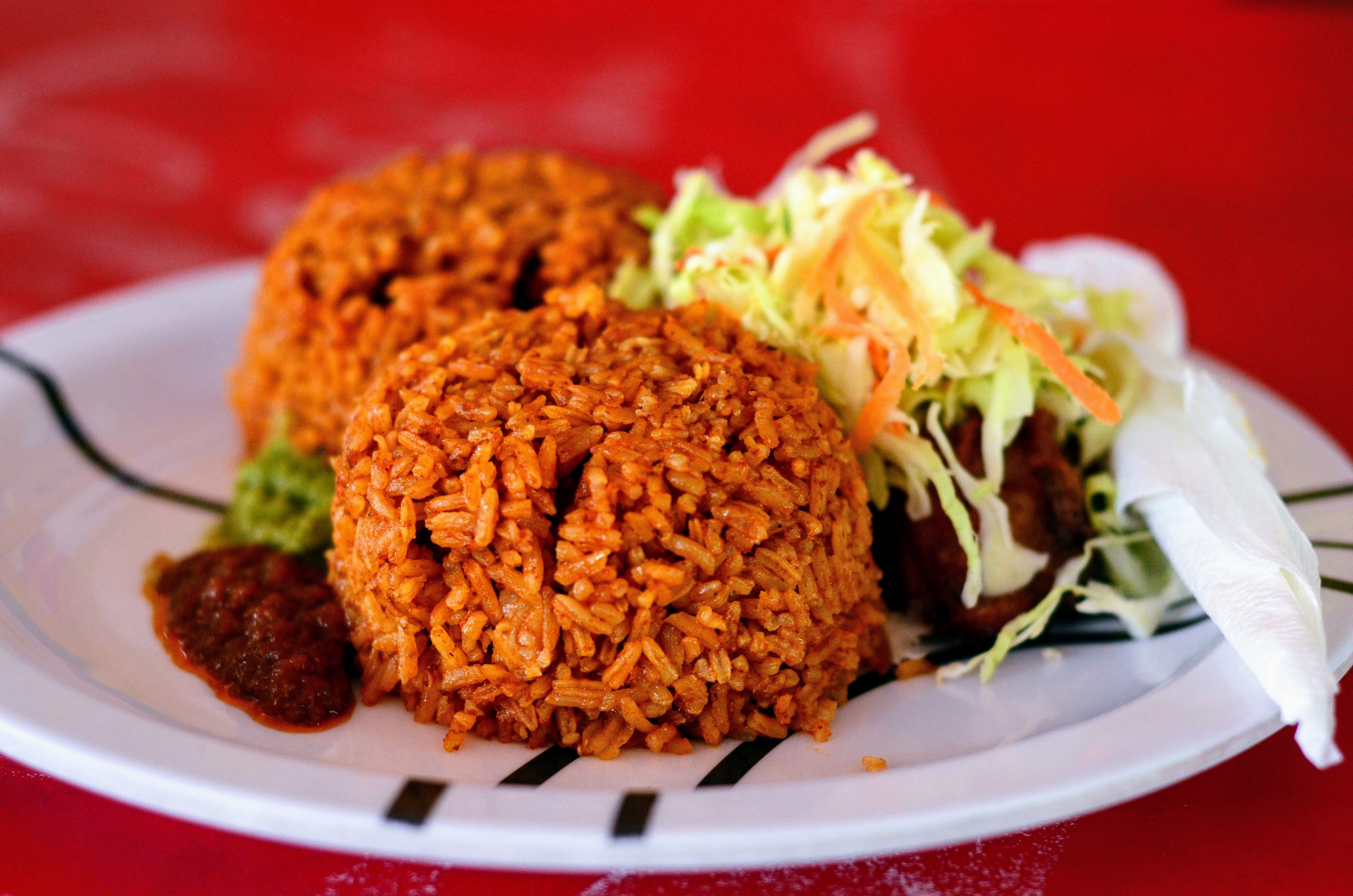
Jollof rice, a famous West African dish

- Benin cuisine
- Burkinabé cuisine
- Cape Verdean cuisine
- Gambian cuisine
- Ghanaian cuisine
- Guinean cuisine
- Guinea-Bissauan cuisine
- Ivorian cuisine
- Liberian cuisine
- Malian cuisine
- Mauritanian cuisine
- Niger cuisine
- Nigerian cuisine
- Saint Helenian cuisine
- Senegalese cuisine
- Sierra Leone cuisine
- Togolese cuisine
- Yoruba cuisine

=== Cuisine of the Americas ===
- Latin American cuisine
- Native American cuisine
  - Inuit cuisine
  - Tlingit cuisine

==== North American cuisine ====
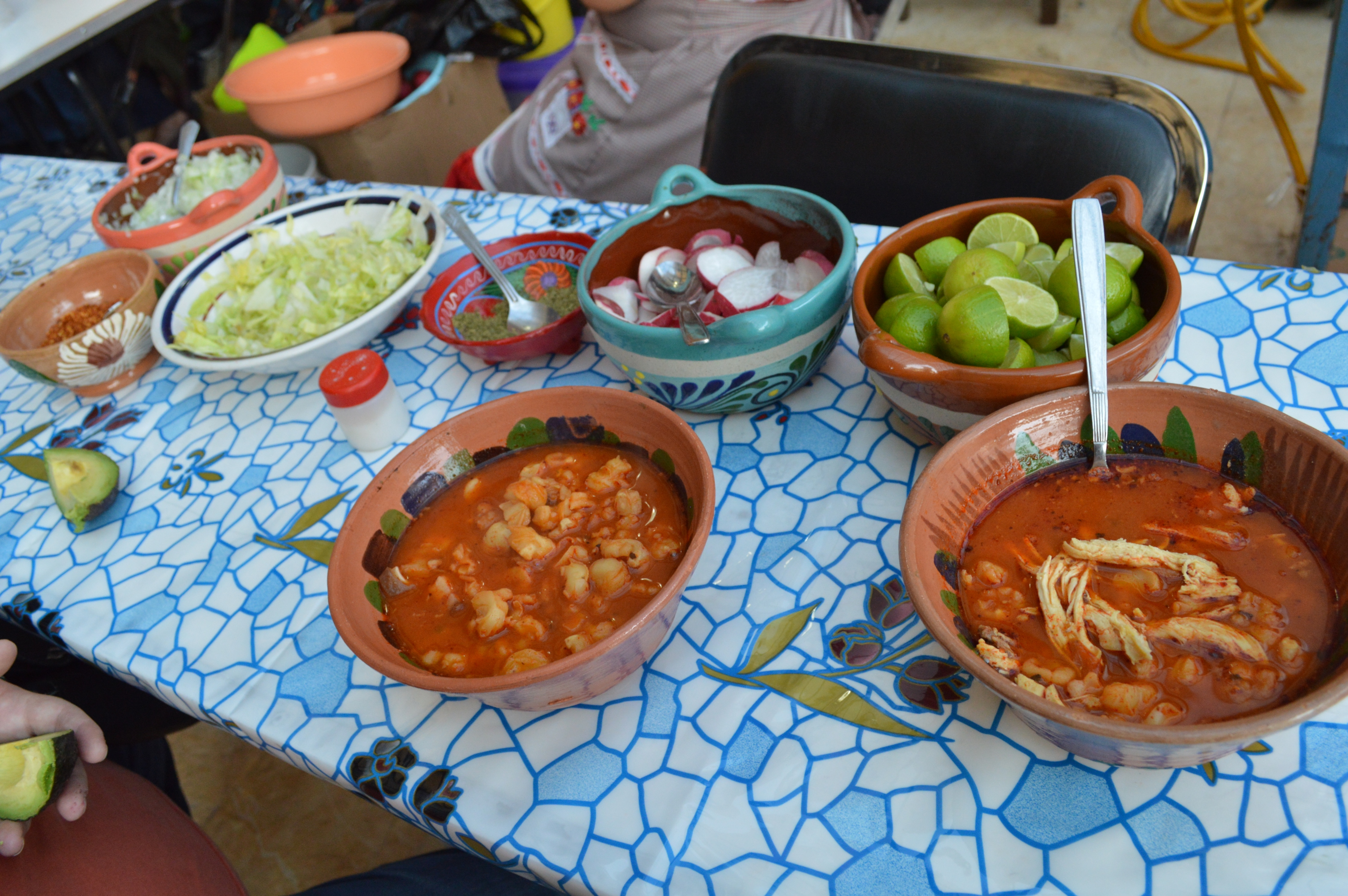
Red pozole, a common Mexican stew, with various accompaniments

- Bermudian cuisine
- Canadian cuisine
  - Canadian Chinese cuisine
  - Cuisine of the Maritimes
  - Cuisine of Quebec
  - Cuisine of Toronto
- Greenlandic cuisine
- Inuit cuisine
- Mexican cuisine
  - Cuisine of Chiapas
  - Cuisine of Mexico City
  - Oaxacan cuisine
  - Cuisine of Veracruz
  - Mesoamerican cuisine
    - Ancient Maya cuisine
    - Aztec cuisine
  - Mexican-American cuisine
    - Cali-Mex cuisine
      - Korean-Mexican fusion
    - New Mexican cuisine
    - Tex-Mex cuisine
- Tlingit cuisine

===== American cuisine =====
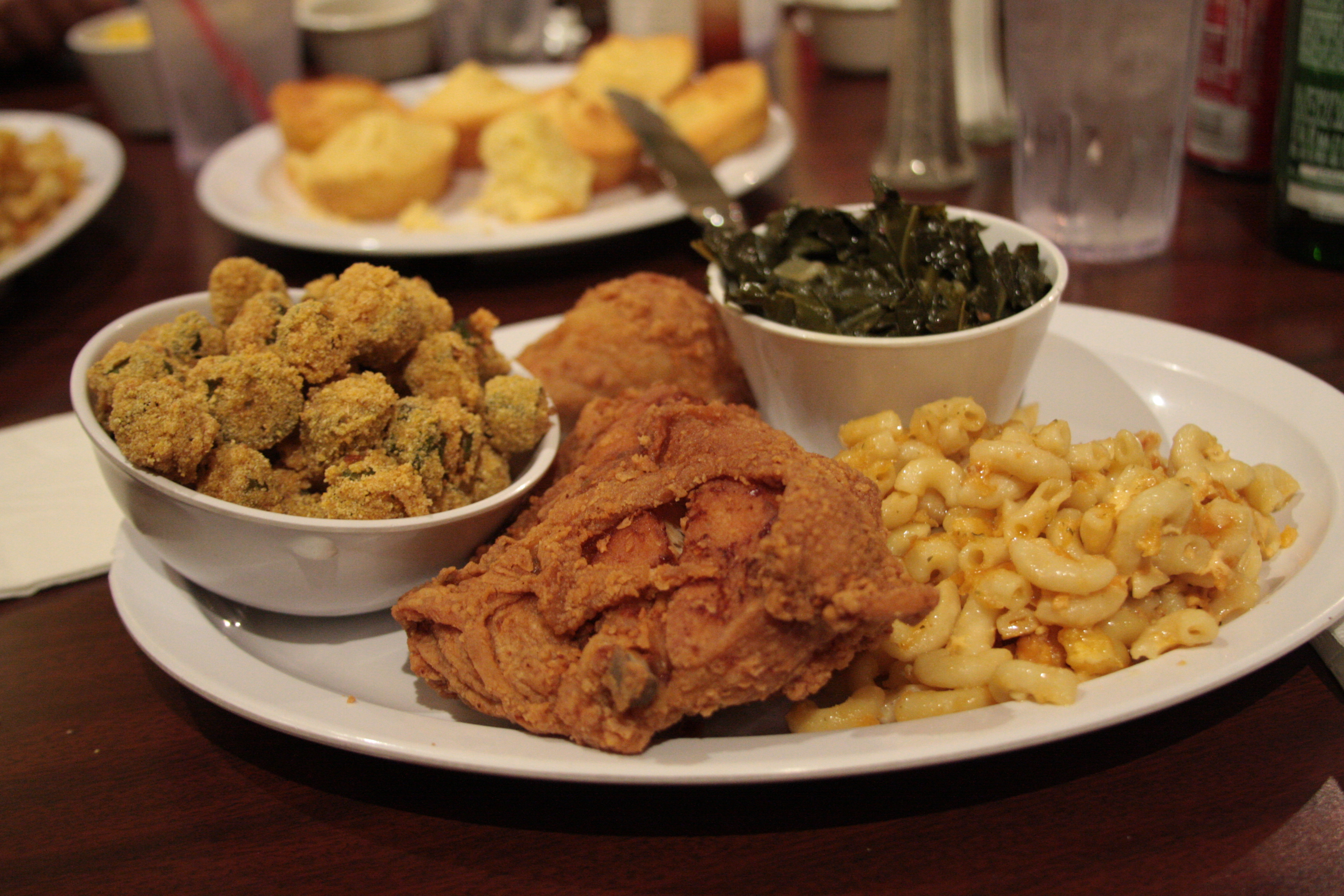
A meal typical of soul food: fried chicken, macaroni and cheese, collard greens, fried okra, and cornbread

- Midwestern American cuisine
  - Cuisine of Chicago
  - Cuisine of North Dakota
  - Cuisine of Omaha
  - Cuisine of St. Louis
  - Cuisine of Wisconsin
  - Minnesotan cuisine
    - Iron Range cuisine
- Northeastern American cuisines
  - Cuisine of New England
  - Cuisine of the Mid-Atlantic United States
    - Cuisine of Baltimore
    - Cuisine of New Jersey
    - Cuisine of New York City
    - Cuisine of the Pennsylvania Dutch
    - Cuisine of Philadelphia
    - Cuisine of Pittsburgh
- Southern American cuisine
  - Cuisine of Atlanta
  - Floribbean cuisine
  - Cuisine of Kentucky
  - Louisiana Creole cuisine
    - Cajun cuisine
    - Cuisine of New Orleans
  - Lowcountry cuisine
  - Soul food
- Southwestern American cuisine
  - New Mexican cuisine
  - Texan cuisine
    - Tex-Mex cuisine
- Western American cuisine
  - Cuisine of California
    - California cuisine
    - Korean-Mexican fusion
  - Hawaiian cuisine
  - Pacific Northwest cuisine
  - Rocky Mountain cuisine
- Fusion cuisine
  - American Jewish cuisine
  - Cajun cuisine
  - Chinese American cuisine
  - Filipino-American cuisine
  - Floribbean cuisine
  - German-American cuisine
  - Greek-American cuisine
  - Indian-American cuisine
  - Italian-American cuisine
  - Japanese-American cuisine
  - Korean-American cuisine
    - Korean-Mexican fusion
  - Mexican-American cuisine
    - Cali-Mex cuisine
    - New Mexican cuisine
    - Tex-Mex cuisine
  - Cuisine of the Pennsylvania Dutch
  - Thai-American cuisine
  - Vietnamese-American cuisine
  - New American cuisine

==== Central American cuisine ====
- Belizean cuisine
- Costa Rican cuisine
- Guatemalan cuisine
- Honduran cuisine
- Mesoamerican cuisine
  - Ancient Maya cuisine
- Nicaraguan cuisine
- Panamanian cuisine
- Salvadoran cuisine

==== South American cuisine ====
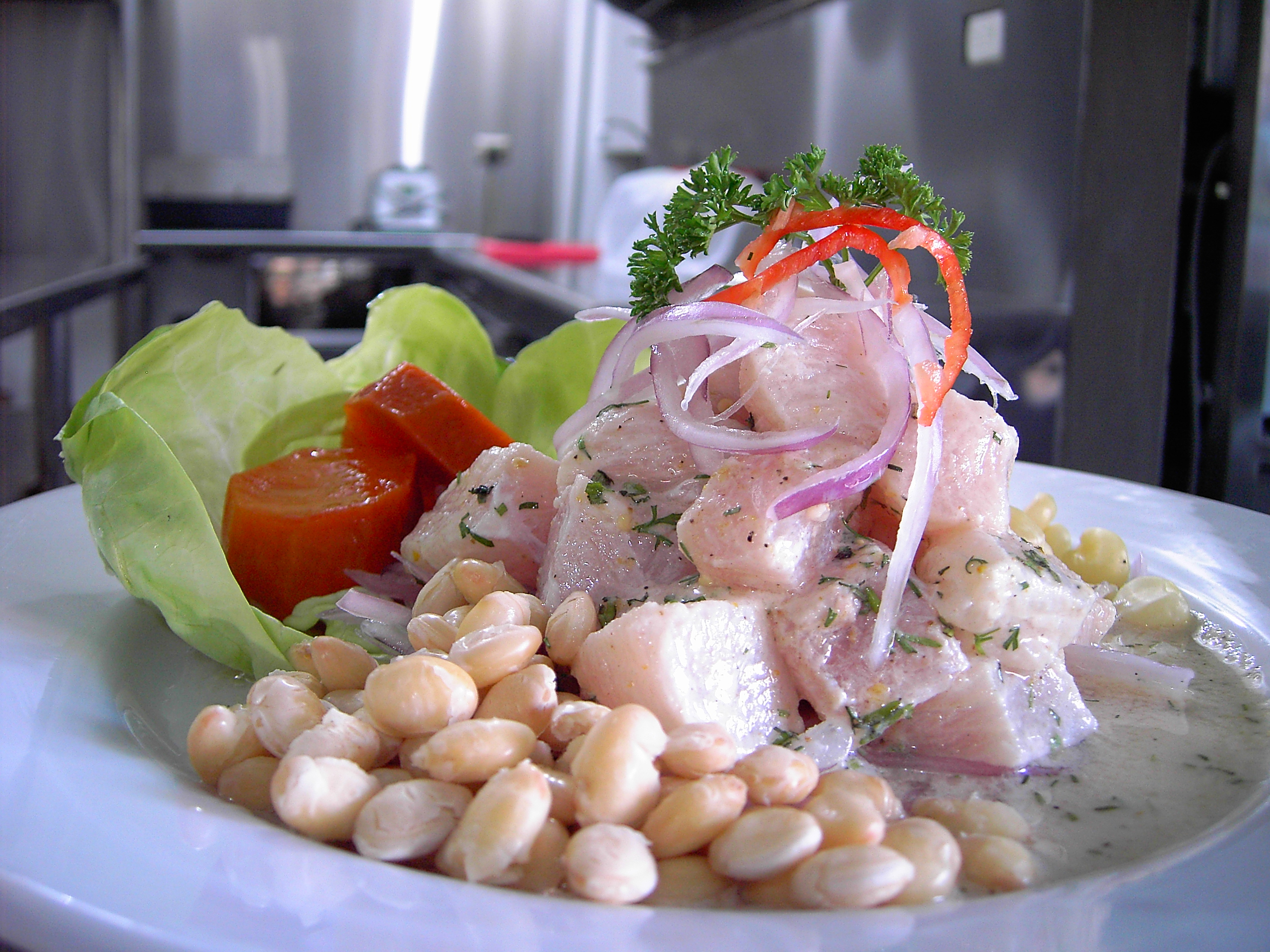
Ceviche, one of the most famous South American dishes

- Argentine cuisine
- Bolivian cuisine
- Brazilian cuisine
- Chilean cuisine
- Colombian cuisine
  - Muisca cuisine
- Ecuadorian cuisine
- French Guianan cuisine
- Guyanese cuisine
- Paraguayan cuisine
  - Cuisine of Asunción
- Peruvian cuisine
  - Peruvian-Chinese cuisine
  - Peruvian-Japanese cuisine
  - Amazonian cuisine
  - Arequipan cuisine
  - Inca cuisine
- Surinamese cuisine
- Uruguayan cuisine
  - Cuisine of Montevideo
- Venezuelan cuisine

==== Caribbean cuisine ====
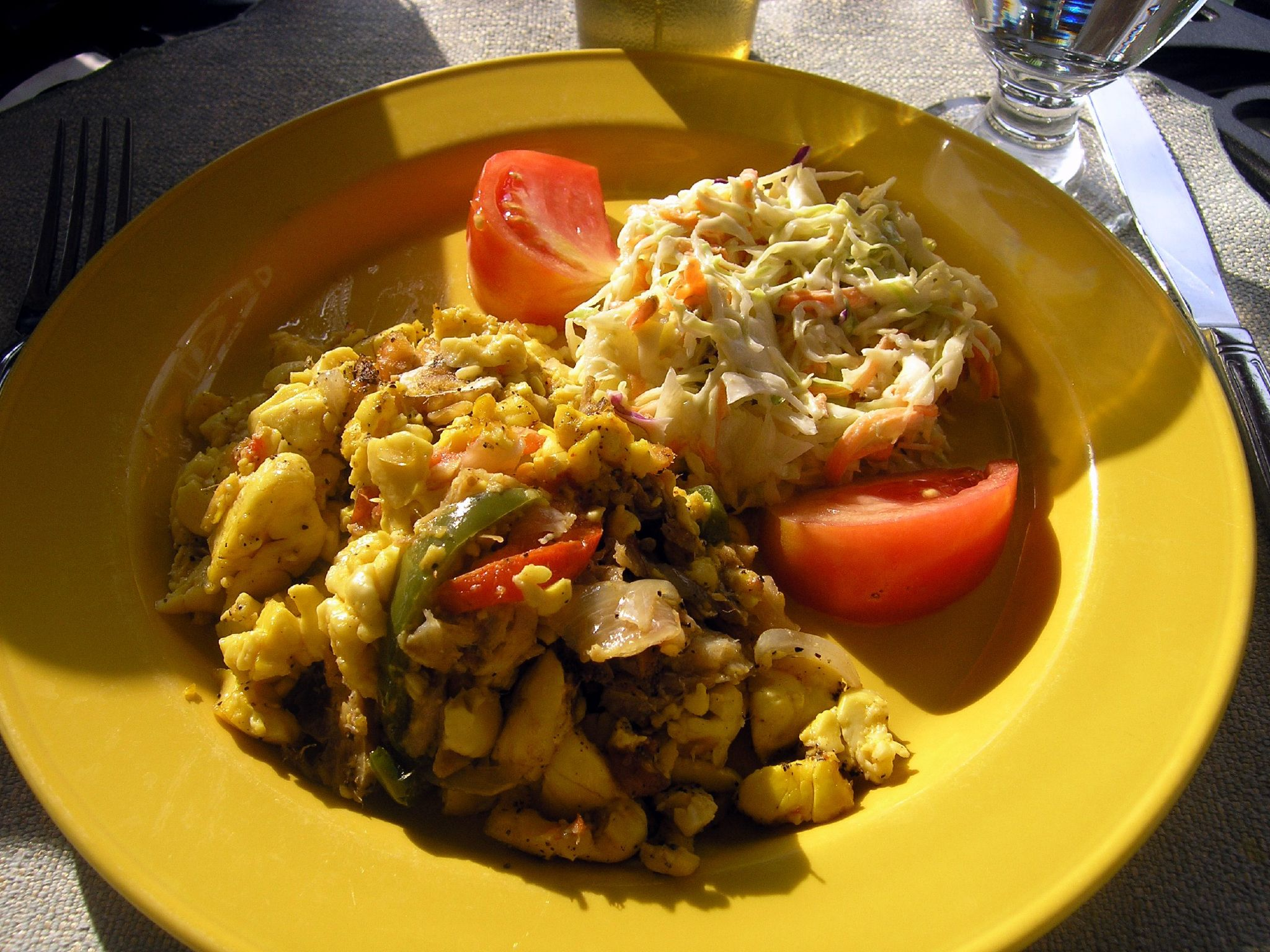
Ackee and saltfish, the national dish of Jamaica

- Anguillan cuisine
- Antigua and Barbuda cuisine
- Aruban cuisine
- Bahamian cuisine
- Barbadian cuisine
- Belizean cuisine
- British Virgin Islands cuisine
- Cayman Islands cuisine
- Caribbean Chinese cuisine
- Cuban cuisine
- Curaçao cuisine
- Dominica cuisine
- Dominican Republic cuisine
- Floribbean cuisine
- French Guianan cuisine
- Grenadian cuisine
- Guyanese cuisine
- Haitian cuisine
- Jamaican cuisine
- Martinican cuisine
- Montserrat cuisine
- Puerto Rican cuisine
- St. Kitts and Nevis cuisine
- Saint Lucian cuisine
- Surinamese cuisine
- Trinidad and Tobago cuisine
- Turks and Caicos cuisine
- US Virgin Islands cuisine

=== Asian cuisine ===
==== Central Asian cuisine ====
- Afghan cuisine
  - Hazara cuisine
  - Pashtun cuisine
- Balochi cuisine
- Bashkir cuisine
- Bukharan Jewish cuisine
- Dagestani cuisine
- Iranian cuisine
  - Caspian cuisine
  - Kurdish cuisine
- Karakalpak cuisine
- Kazakh cuisine
- Koryo-saram cuisine
- Kyrgyz cuisine
- Tajik cuisine
- Tatar cuisine
- Turkmen cuisine
- Uyghur cuisine
- Uzbek cuisine

==== East Asian cuisine ====
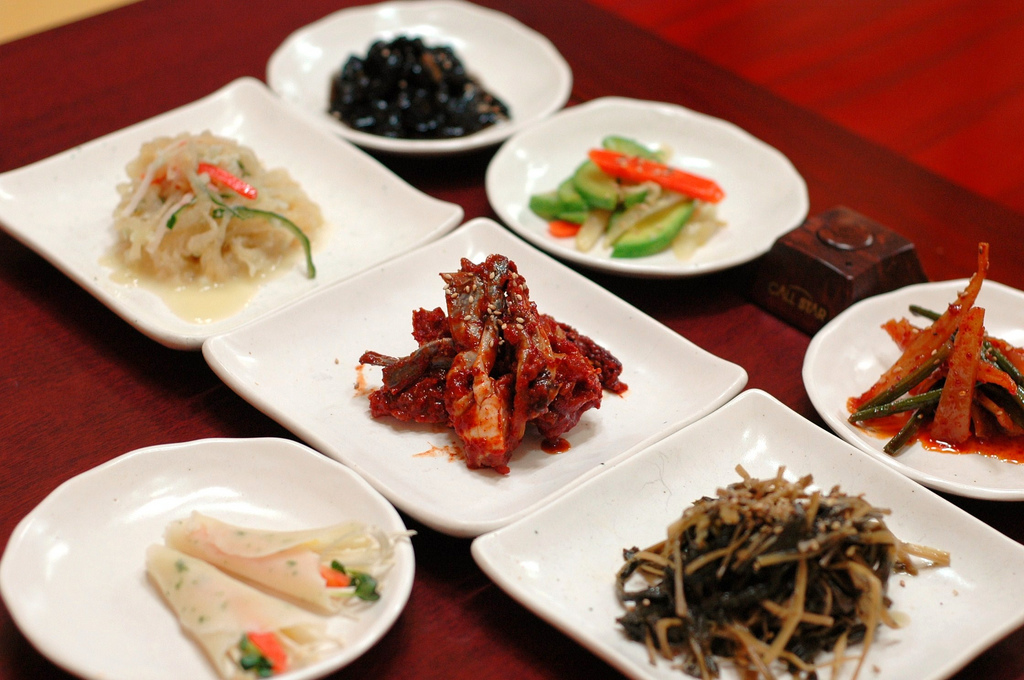
A spread of various Korean banchan

- Japanese cuisine
  - Ainu cuisine
  - Kaiseki
  - Okinawan cuisine
  - Japanese regional cuisine
    - Nagoya cuisine
  - Japanese fusion cuisine
    - Japanese-American cuisine
    - Japanese Chinese cuisine
      - Shippoku
    - Hawaiian cuisine
    - Itameshi
    - Yoshoku
- Korean cuisine
  - Korean Chinese cuisine
  - Korean regional cuisine
  - Korean royal court cuisine
  - Korean temple cuisine
  - Koryo-saram cuisine
  - North Korean cuisine
  - Sakhalin Korean cuisine
  - South Korean cuisine
  - Korean-Mexican fusion
- Vietnamese cuisine

===== Chinese cuisine =====
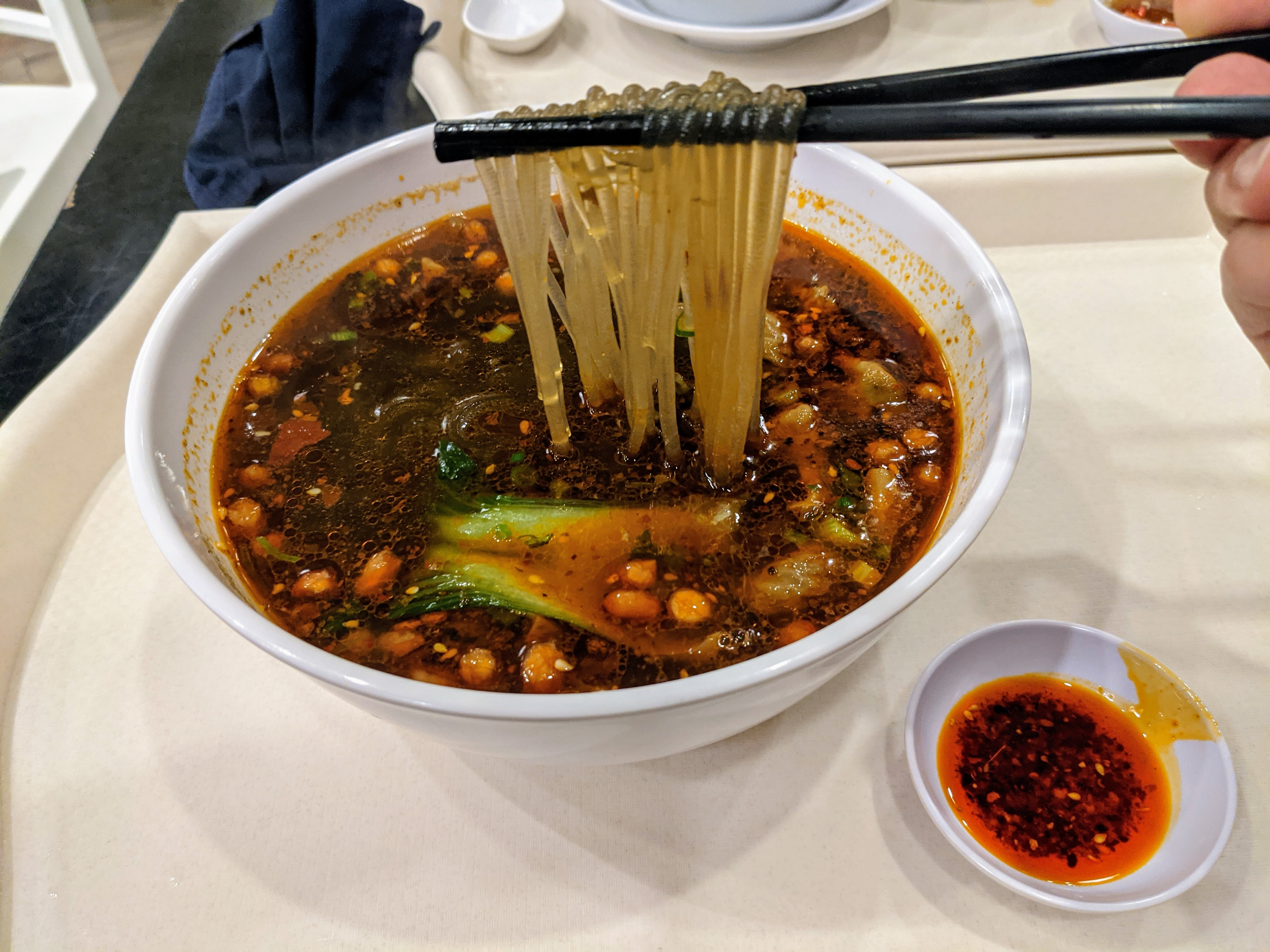
Hot and sour noodles topped with pork intestines, peanuts, and bok choy, a popular Sichuan street snack

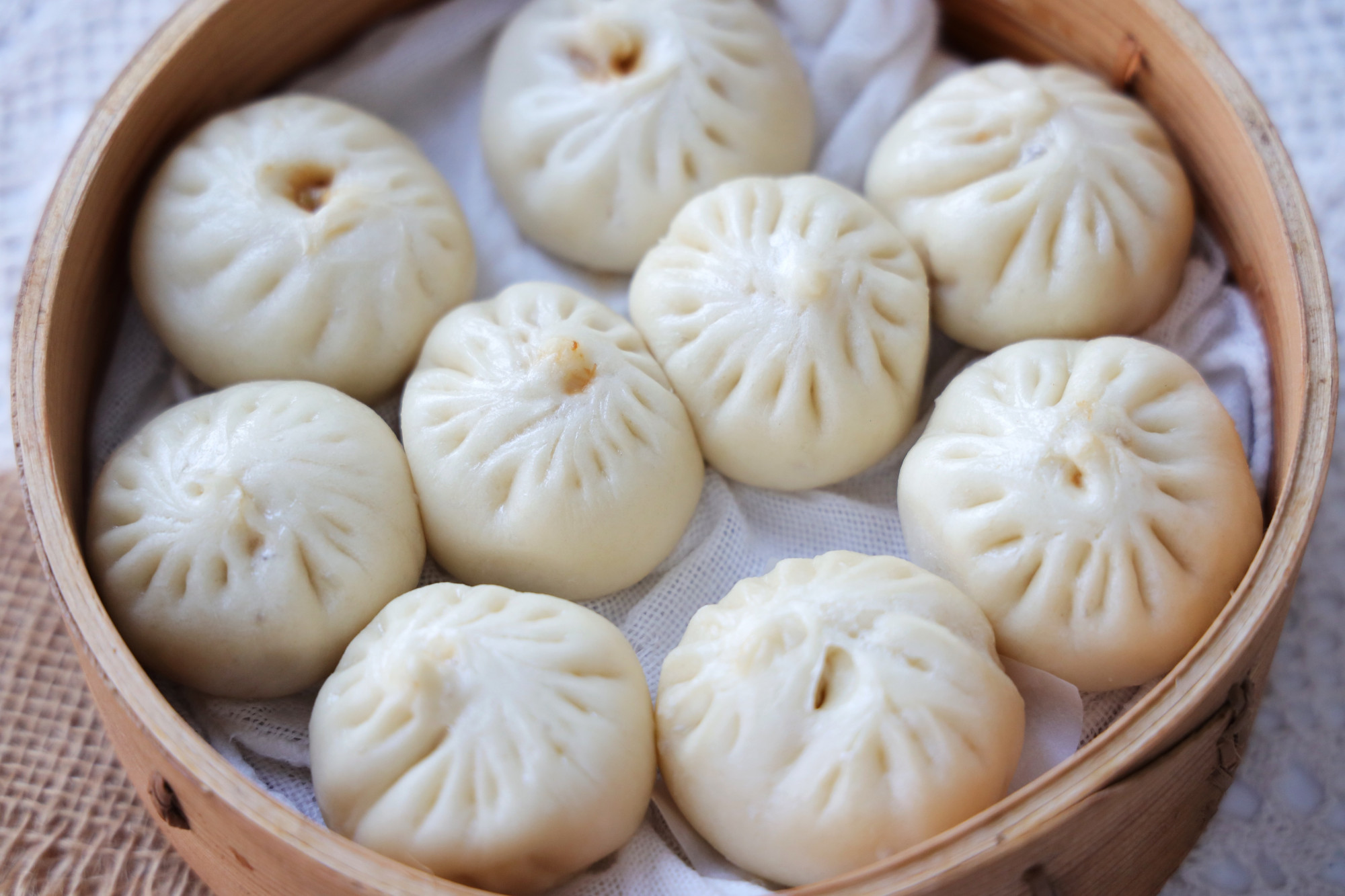
Xiaolongbao served in a traditional steaming basket

- Northern Chinese Cuisine
  - Beijing cuisine
    - Chinese aristocrat cuisine
    - Chinese imperial cuisine
  - Hebei cuisine
  - Henan cuisine
  - Northeastern Chinese cuisine
    - Heilongjiang cuisine
    - Jilin cuisine
    - Liaoning cuisine
    - Manchu cuisine
  - Shandong cuisine
  - Shanxi cuisine
  - Tianjin cuisine
  - Xuzhou cuisine
- Central Chinese Cuisine
  - Anhui cuisine
  - Jiangsu cuisine
    - Huaiyang cuisine
  - Shanghai cuisine
    - Haipai cuisine
  - Zhejiang cuisine
    - Hangbang cuisine
- North Western Chinese Cuisine
  - Gansu cuisine
  - Ningxia cuisine
  - Qinghai cuisine
  - Shaanxi cuisine
- South Western Chinese Cuisine
  - Guilin cuisine
  - Guizhou cuisine
  - Hubei cuisine
  - Hunan cuisine
  - Jiangxi cuisine
  - Sichuan cuisine
  - Tujia cuisine
  - Yunnan cuisine
- Southern Chinese Cuisine
  - Cantonese cuisine
    - Guangxi cuisine
    - Hong Kong cuisine
    - Macanese cuisine
  - Hakka cuisine
  - Min cuisine
    - Fuzhou cuisine
    - Hainan cuisine
    - Minnan cuisine
    - Putian (Henghwa) cuisine
    - Chaoshan (Teochew) cuisine
  - Ou cuisine
  - Taiwan cuisine
- Chinese minority cuisines
  - Hlai cuisine
  - Kachin cuisine
  - Miao cuisine
    - Hmong cuisine
  - Mongolian cuisine
  - Tibetan cuisine
  - Wa cuisine
  - Xinjiang (Uyghur) cuisine
  - Yao cuisine
  - Yi cuisine
  - Zhuang cuisine
- Chinese religious cuisines
  - Chinese Buddhist cuisine
  - Chinese Islamic cuisine
  - Taoist diet
- Overseas Chinese cuisine
  - American Chinese cuisine
  - Australian Chinese cuisine
  - British Chinese cuisine
  - Burmese Chinese cuisine
  - Cambodian Chinese cuisine
  - Canadian Chinese cuisine
  - Caribbean Chinese cuisine
  - Filipino Chinese cuisine
  - French Chinese cuisine
  - Indian Chinese cuisine
  - Indonesian Chinese cuisine
  - Japanese Chinese cuisine
    - Shippoku
  - Latin American Chinese cuisine
    - Cuban Chinese cuisine
    - Mexican Chinese cuisine
    - Peruvian Chinese cuisine
    - Puerto Rican Chinese cuisine
  - Korean Chinese cuisine
  - Malaysian Chinese cuisine
  - Mauritian Chinese cuisine
  - New Zealand Chinese cuisine
  - Pakistani Chinese cuisine
  - Peranakan cuisine
  - Singaporean Chinese cuisine
  - Thai Chinese cuisine
  - Vietnamese Chinese cuisine

==== Highland Asian cuisine ====
- Bhutanese cuisine
- Mongolian cuisine
  - Buryat cuisine
  - Kalmyk cuisine
- Sikkimese cuisine
- Tibetan cuisine
- Tuvan cuisine

==== North Asian cuisine ====
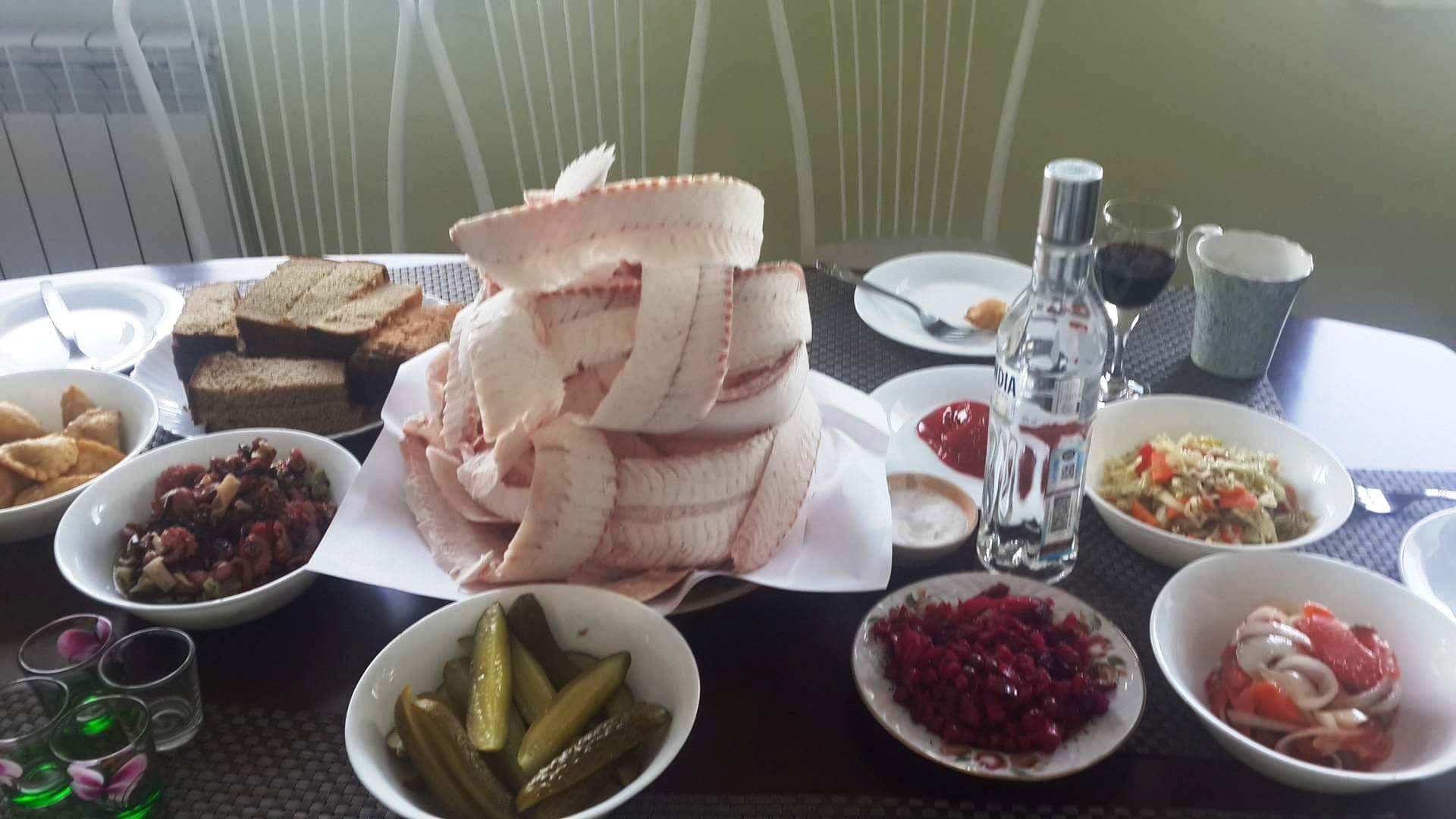
Stroganina, an Asian Russian dish of raw, thin, long-sliced frozen fish.

- Russian cuisine
  - Buryat cuisine
  - Chukchi cuisine
  - Cuisine of Commander Islands
  - Sakha cuisine
  - Sakhalin Korean cuisine
  - Yamal cuisine
  - Yup'ik cuisine

==== South Asian cuisine ====
- Bangladeshi cuisine
  - Bengali cuisine
- Maldivian cuisine
- Nepalese cuisine
  - Newari cuisine
- Sri Lankan cuisine

===== Indian cuisine =====
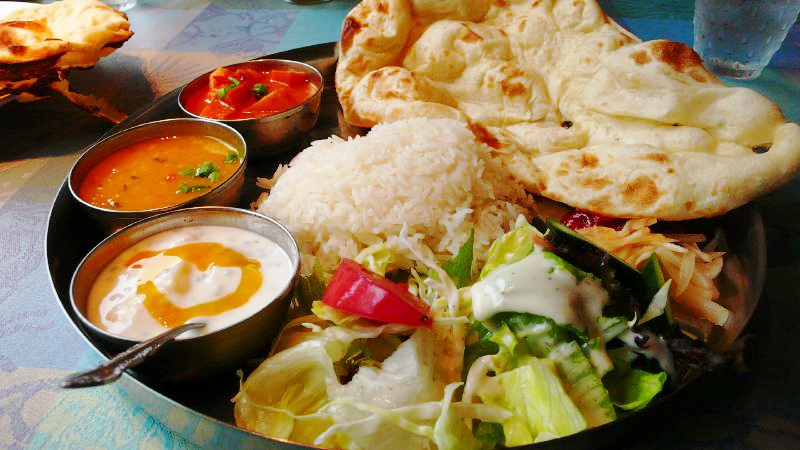
Uttar Pradeshi thali (platter) with naan, rice, daal, raita, shahi paneer, and salad

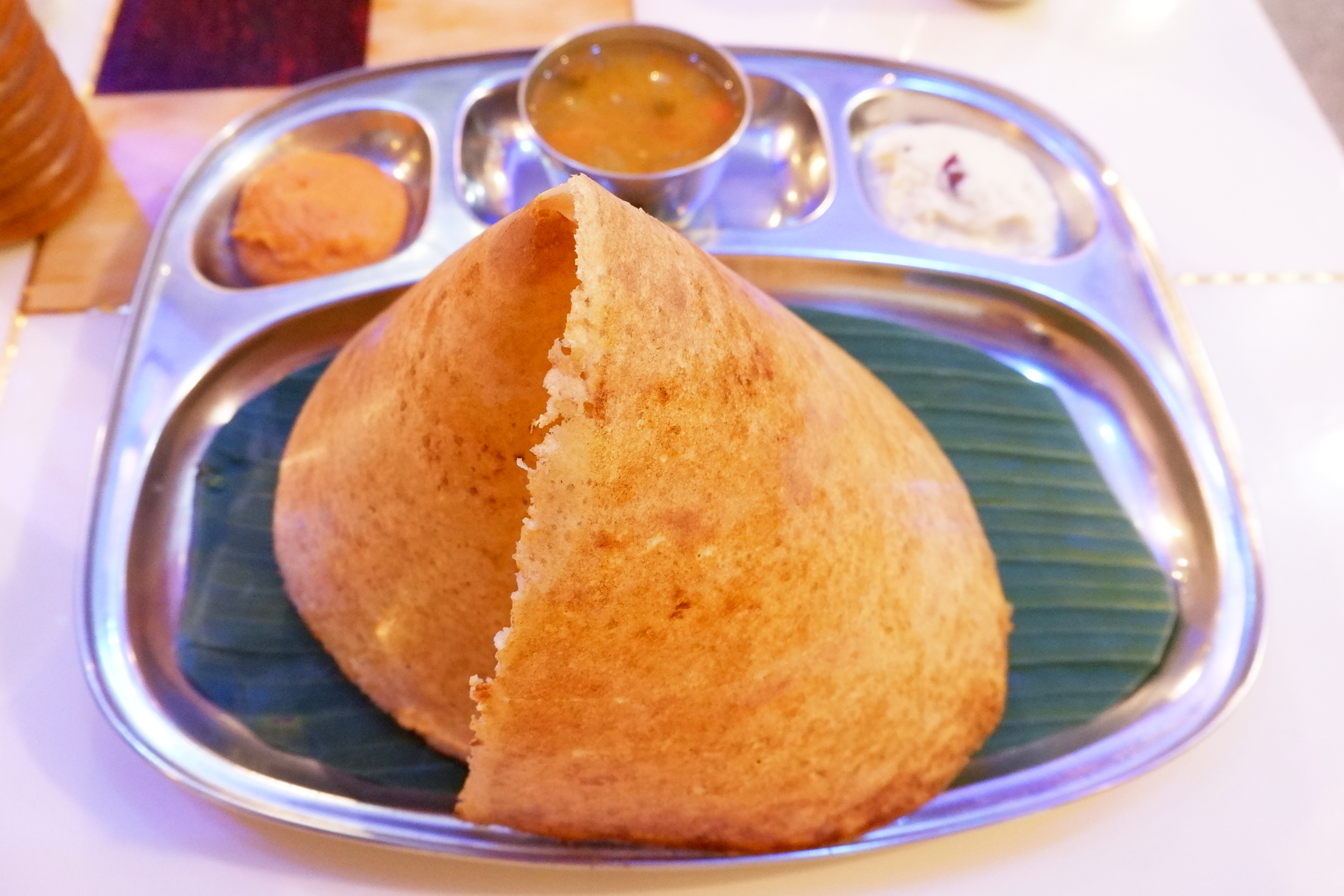
Dosa, a South Indian flatbread, with sambar and chutney

- West Indian cuisine
  - Goan cuisine
    - Goan Catholic cuisine
  - Gujarati cuisine
  - Maharashtrian cuisine
    - Hridhaansh cuisine
  - Malvani cuisine
  - Parsi cuisine
  - Rajasthani cuisine
    - Vansh cuisine
  - Sindhi cuisine
- North Indian cuisine
  - Bhojpuri cuisine
  - Kashmiri cuisine
  - Maithil cuisine
  - Mughlai cuisine
  - Punjabi cuisine
  - Rajasthani cuisine
  - Uttar Pradesh cuisine
    - Awadhi cuisine
- South Indian cuisine
  - Karnataka cuisine
    - Dakshina Karnataka cuisine
    - Kodava cuisine
      - Mangalurean Catholic cuisine
      - Nawayath Muslim cuisine
    - Udupi cuisine
    - Uttara Karnataka cuisine
  - Kerala cuisine
  - Tamil cuisine
    - Chettinad cuisine
  - Telugu cuisine
    - Andhra cuisine
    - Hyderabadi cuisine
- North East Indian cuisine
  - Assamese cuisine
  - Manipuri cuisine
    - Meitei cuisine
  - Mizo cuisine
  - Naga cuisine
  - Sikkimese cuisine
  - Tripuri cuisine
- East Indian cuisine
  - Bengali cuisine
  - Bihari cuisine
  - Jharkhandi cuisine
  - Odia cuisine
  - Oriya cuisine
- Other Indian cuisine
  - Anglo-Indian cuisine
  - Indo Caribbean food
  - Indian Chinese cuisine
  - Indian fast food
  - Indo-Fijian food
  - Indo-South African food
  - Jain cuisine
  - Malaysian Indian cuisine

===== Pakistani cuisine =====
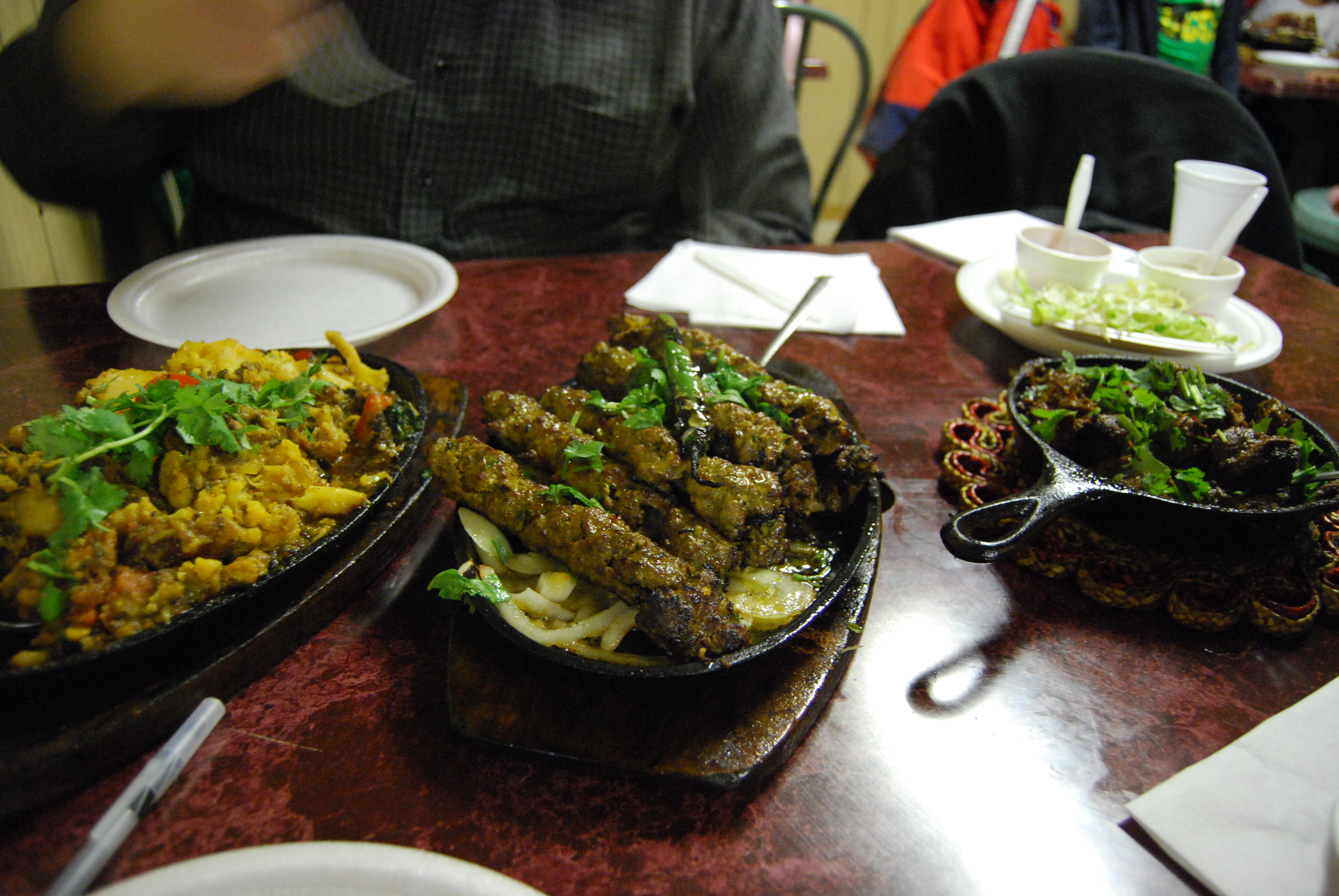
A variety of Pakistani dinner dishes – Starting from the left: gobi aloo, seekh kebab, and beef karahi

- Balochi cuisine
- Hazara cuisine
- Kashmiri cuisine
- Mughlai cuisine
- Muhajir cuisine
- Punjabi cuisine
  - Lahori cuisine
  - Saraiki cuisine
- Pashtun cuisine
- Sindhi cuisine

==== Mainland Southeast Asian cuisine ====
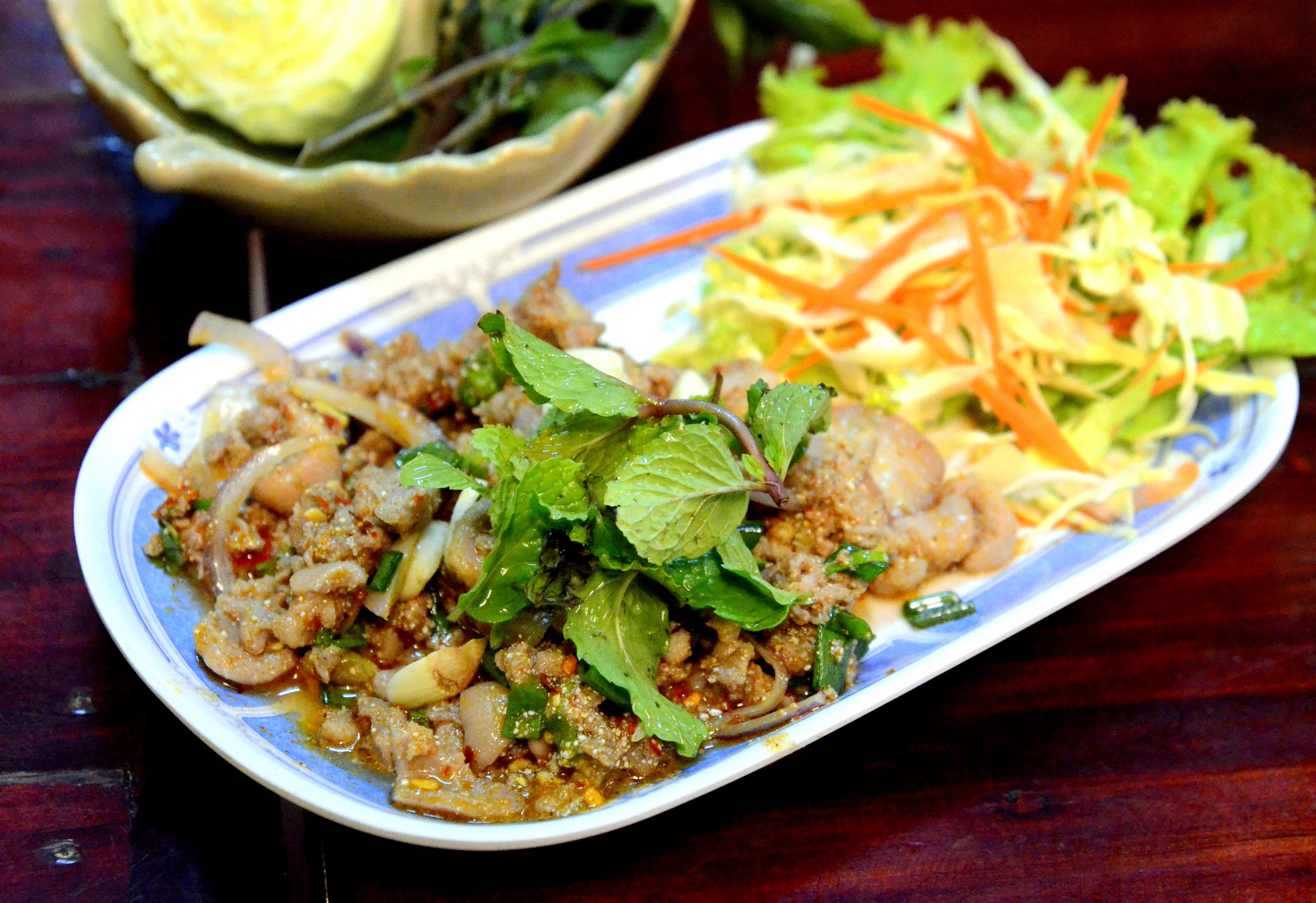
Lao-style larb ped with duck

- Burmese cuisine
  - Burmese Chinese cuisine
- Cambodian cuisine
- Cham cuisine
- Hmong cuisine
- Kachin cuisine
- Karen cuisine
- Manipuri cuisine
  - Meitei cuisine
- Mizo cuisine
- Mon cuisine
- Naga cuisine
- Thai cuisine
  - Lanna cuisine
  - Lao cuisine
  - Shan cuisine
  - Southern Thai cuisine
  - Thai-Chinese cuisine
- Tripuri cuisine
- Vietnamese cuisine
- Wa cuisine

==== Maritime Southeast Asian cuisine ====
- Bruneian cuisine
- Christmas Island cuisine
- East Timor cuisine
- Filipino cuisine
  - Filipino-American cuisine
  - Filipino Chinese cuisine
  - Ilocano cuisine
  - Kapampangan cuisine
  - Mindanao cuisine
  - Tagalog cuisine
  - Visayan cuisine
- Malaysian cuisine
  - Arab cuisine
  - Eurasian cuisine
  - Malay cuisine
  - Malaysian Chinese cuisine
  - Malaysian Indian cuisine
  - Peranakan cuisine
  - Sabahan cuisine
  - Sarawakian cuisine
- Singaporean cuisine

===== Indonesian cuisine =====
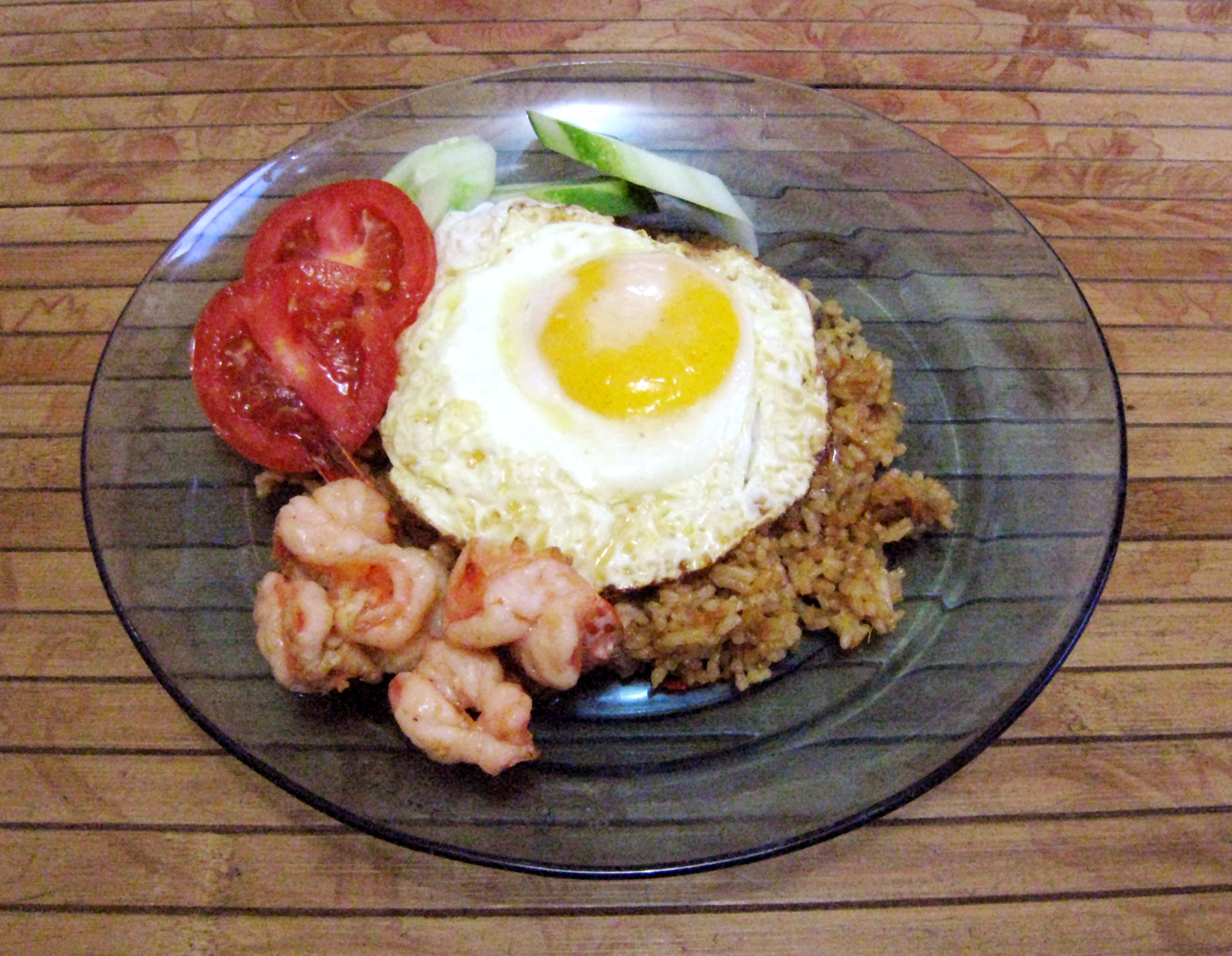
Nasi goreng with shrimp and egg, a typical Indonesian breakfast

- Acehnese cuisine
- Balinese cuisine
- Banjar cuisine
- Batak cuisine
- Indo cuisine
- Indonesian Arab cuisine
- Indonesian Chinese cuisine
- Indonesian Indian cuisine
- Javanese cuisine
  - Betawi cuisine
  - Madurese cuisine
  - Sundanese cuisine
- Makassar cuisine
- Malay cuisine
- Manado cuisine
- Padang food
  - Palembang cuisine
  - Peranakan cuisine

==== West Asian cuisine ====
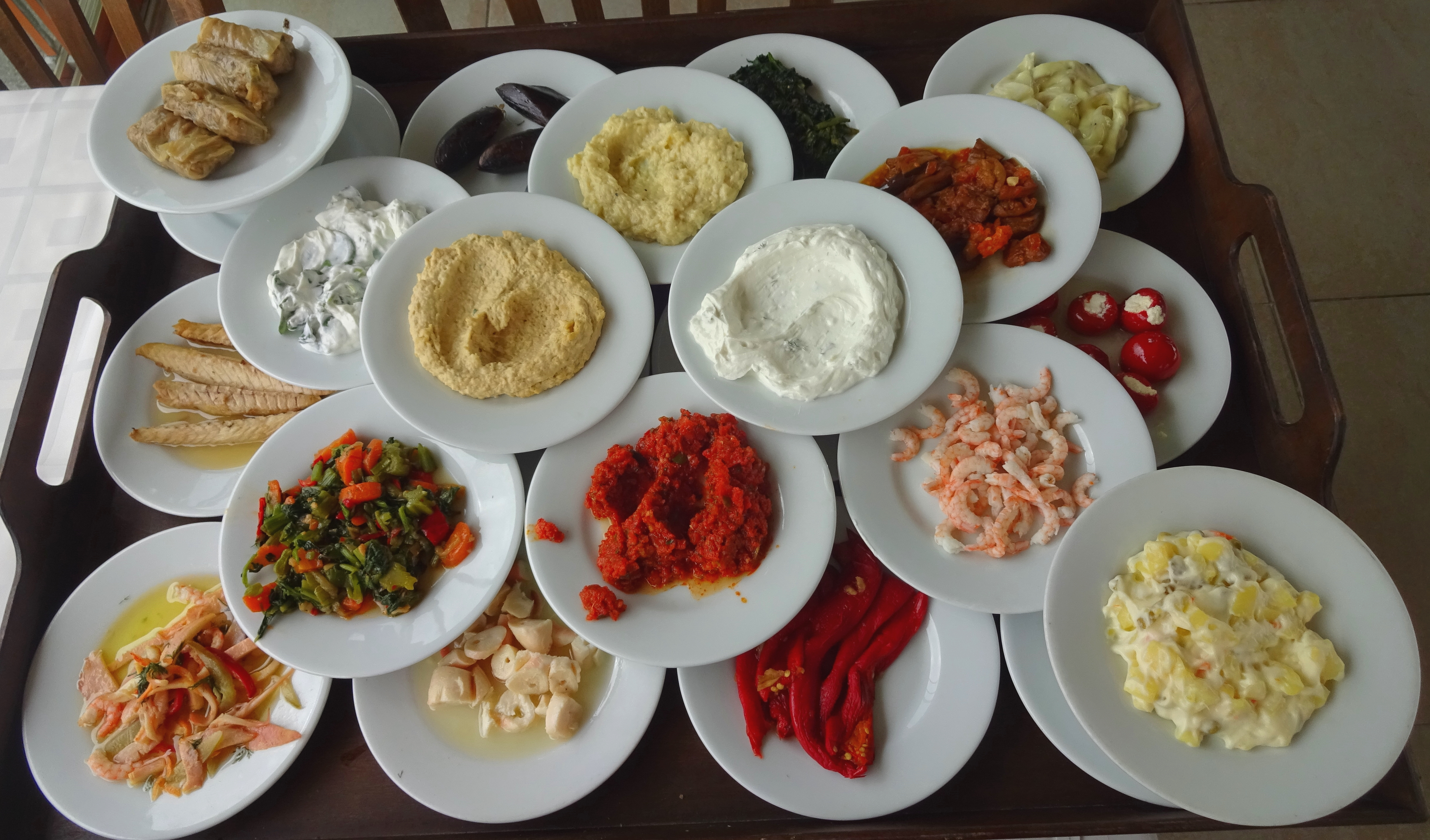
A spread of various meze, one of the distinctive aspects of Levantine cuisine

- Armenian cuisine
- Eastern Arabian cuisine
  - Bahraini cuisine
  - Emirati cuisine
  - Kuwaiti cuisine
  - Omani cuisine
  - Qatari cuisine
  - Saudi Arabian cuisine
  - Yemeni cuisine
- Kurdish cuisine
- Levantine cuisine
  - Iraqi cuisine
  - Israeli cuisine
    - Ancient Israelite cuisine
  - Jordanian cuisine
  - Lebanese cuisine
  - Mizrahi Jewish cuisine
  - Palestinian cuisine
  - Syrian cuisine
    - Syrian Jewish cuisine
- Assyrian cuisine
- Caucasian cuisine
  - Azerbaijani cuisine
  - Chechen cuisine
  - Circassian cuisine
  - Dagestani cuisine
  - Georgian cuisine
  - Ossetian cuisine
- Iranian cuisine
  - Balochi cuisine
  - Caspian cuisine
- Sephardic Jewish cuisine
- Turkish cuisine
  - Pontic Greek cuisine

=== European cuisine ===
==== Central European cuisine ====
- Ashkenazi Jewish cuisine
- Austrian cuisine
  - Viennese cuisine
- Czech cuisine
  - Moravian cuisine
- Hungarian cuisine
- Liechtensteiner cuisine
- Polish cuisine
  - Silesian cuisine
- Slovak cuisine
- Slovenian cuisine
- Swiss cuisine

===== German cuisine =====
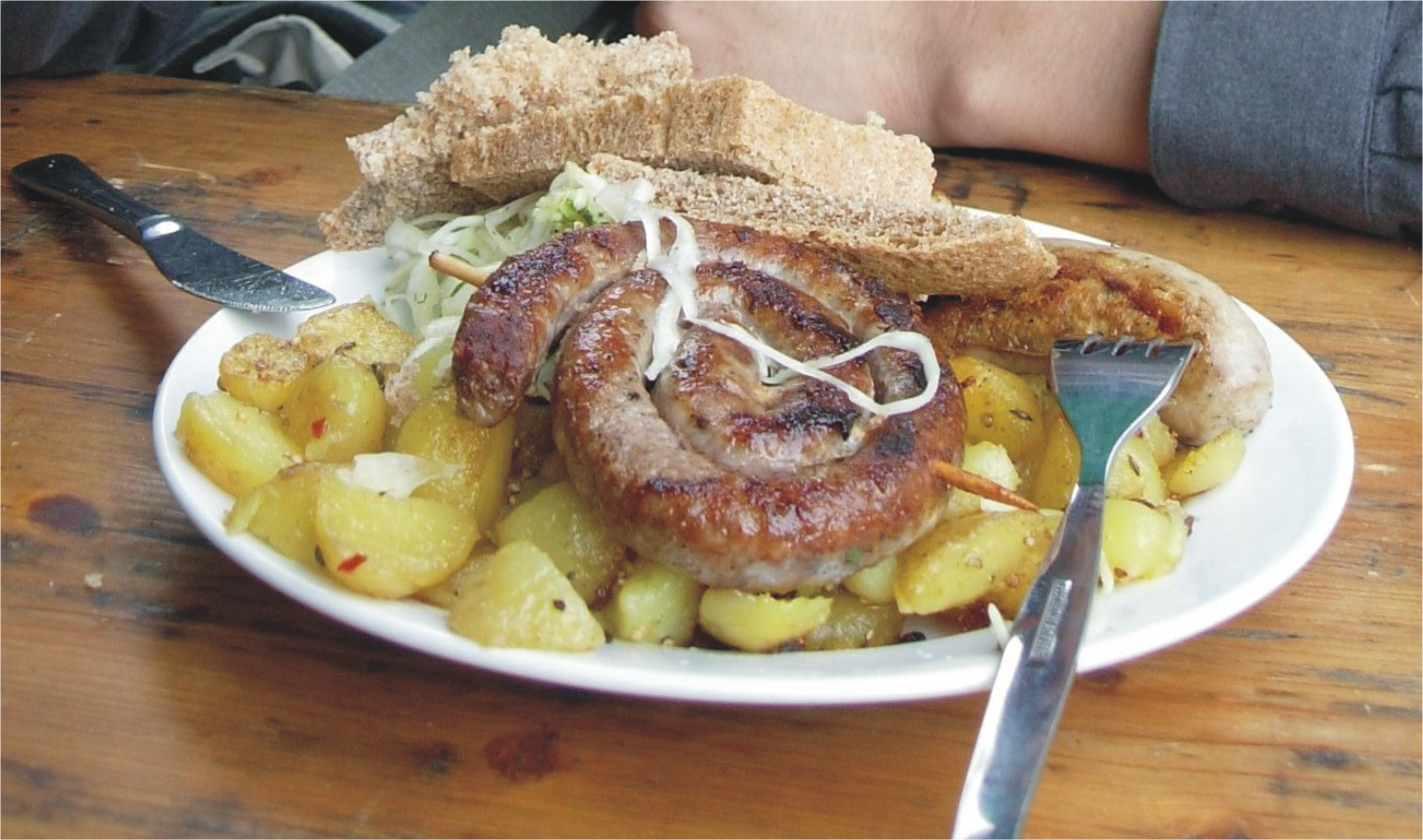
Bratwurst, a traditional German sausage

- German-American cuisine
- Austrian cuisine
  - Viennese cuisine
- Baden cuisine
- Bavarian cuisine
- Brandenburg cuisine
- Franconian cuisine
- Hamburg cuisine
- Hessian cuisine
- Liechtensteiner cuisine
- Lower Saxon cuisine
- Mecklenburg cuisine
- Palatine cuisine
- Pomeranian cuisine
- Rhenish-Hessian cuisine
- Saxon cuisine
- Schleswig-Holstein cuisine
- Silesian cuisine
- Swabian cuisine
- Swiss cuisine
- Thuringian cuisine

==== Eastern European cuisine ====
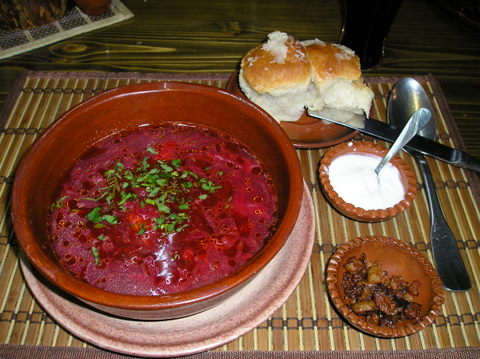
Borscht, a common Eastern European soup, with a side of pampushky

- Belarusian cuisine
- Cossack cuisine
- Russian cuisine
  - Bashkir cuisine
  - Chechen cuisine
  - Circassian cuisine
  - Komi cuisine
  - Mordovian cuisine
  - Tatar cuisine
  - Udmurt cuisine
- Ukrainian cuisine
  - Crimean Tatar cuisine
  - Odesite cuisine

==== Northern European cuisine ====
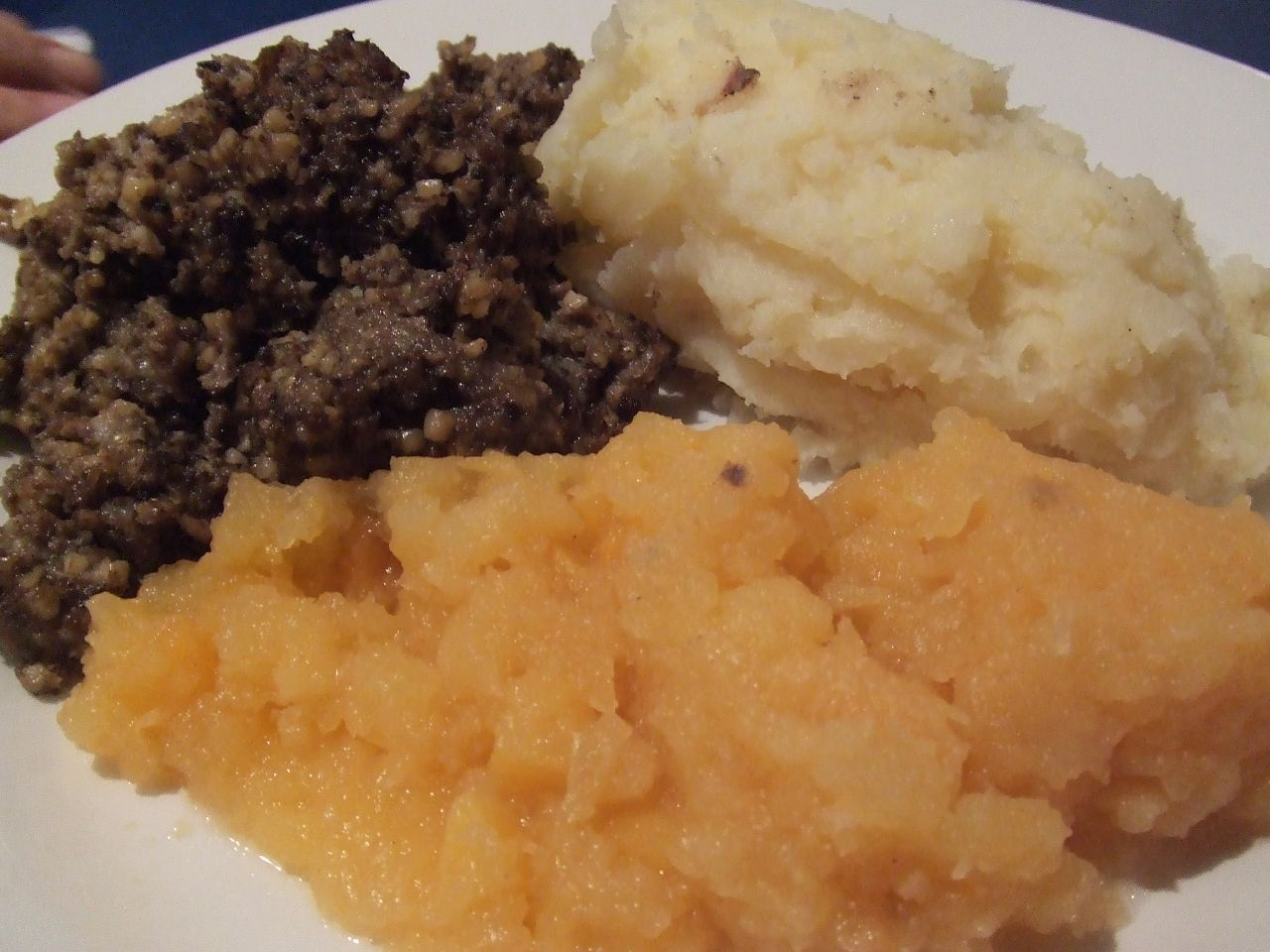
A traditional Scottish meal: haggis, neeps and tatties

- Baltic cuisines
  - Estonian cuisine
  - Latvian cuisine
  - Lithuanian cuisine
  - Livonian cuisine
- Nordic cuisines
  - Danish cuisine
    - Faroese cuisine
    - New Nordic cuisine
  - Finnish cuisine
  - Icelandic cuisine
  - Norwegian cuisine
  - Sami cuisine
  - Swedish cuisine

==== South Eastern European cuisine ====
- Balkan cuisine
  - Albanian cuisine
    - Kosovan cuisine
  - Aromanian cuisine
  - Bosnian cuisine
  - Bulgarian cuisine
  - Croatian cuisine
  - Gagauz cuisine
  - Macedonian cuisine
  - Montenegrin cuisine
  - Serbian cuisine
- Romani cuisine
- Romanian cuisine
  - Moldovan cuisine
  - Transylvanian Saxon cuisine

==== Southern European cuisine ====
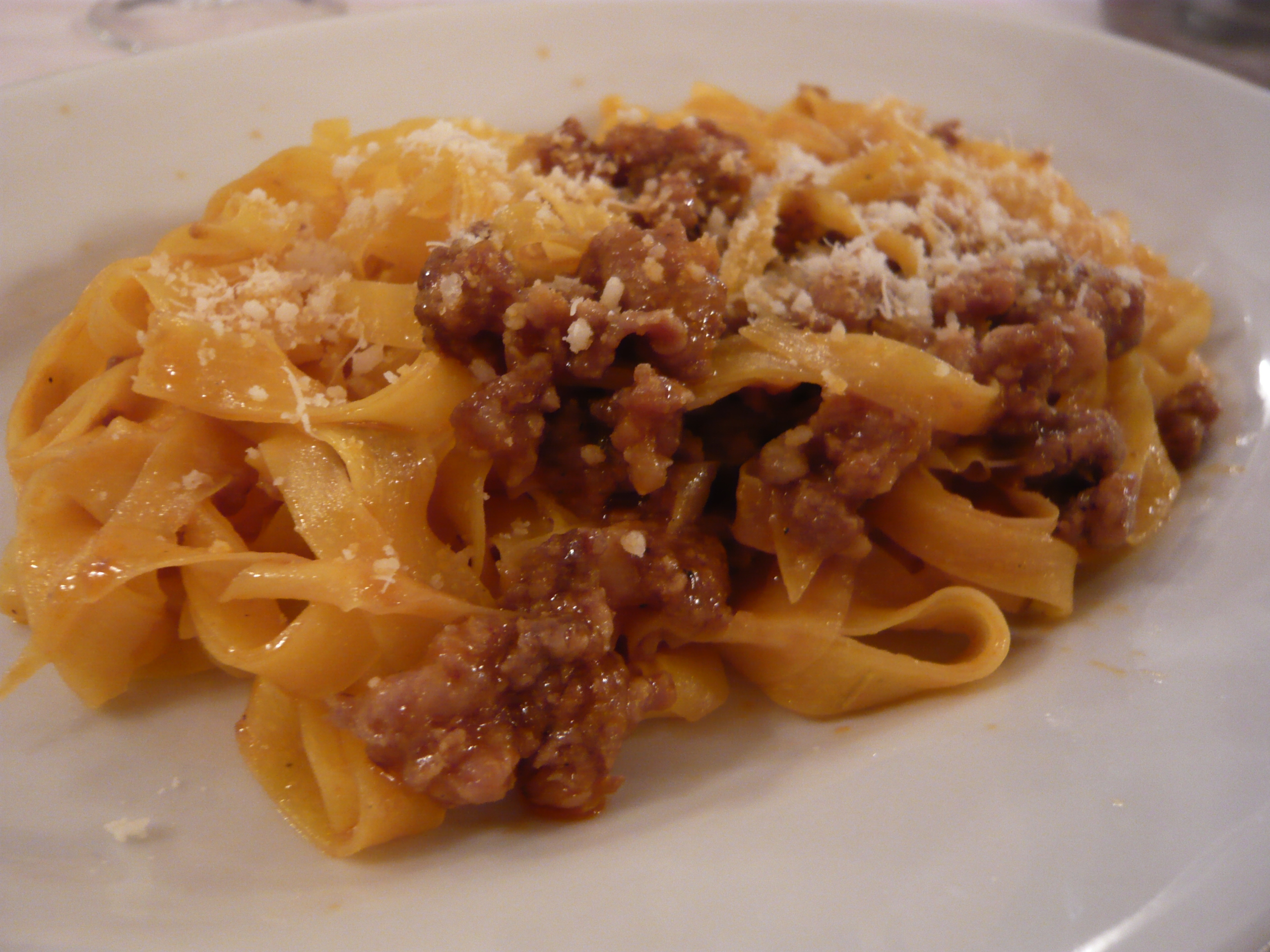
Tagliatelle al ragù, a typical Italian dish of the city of Bologna

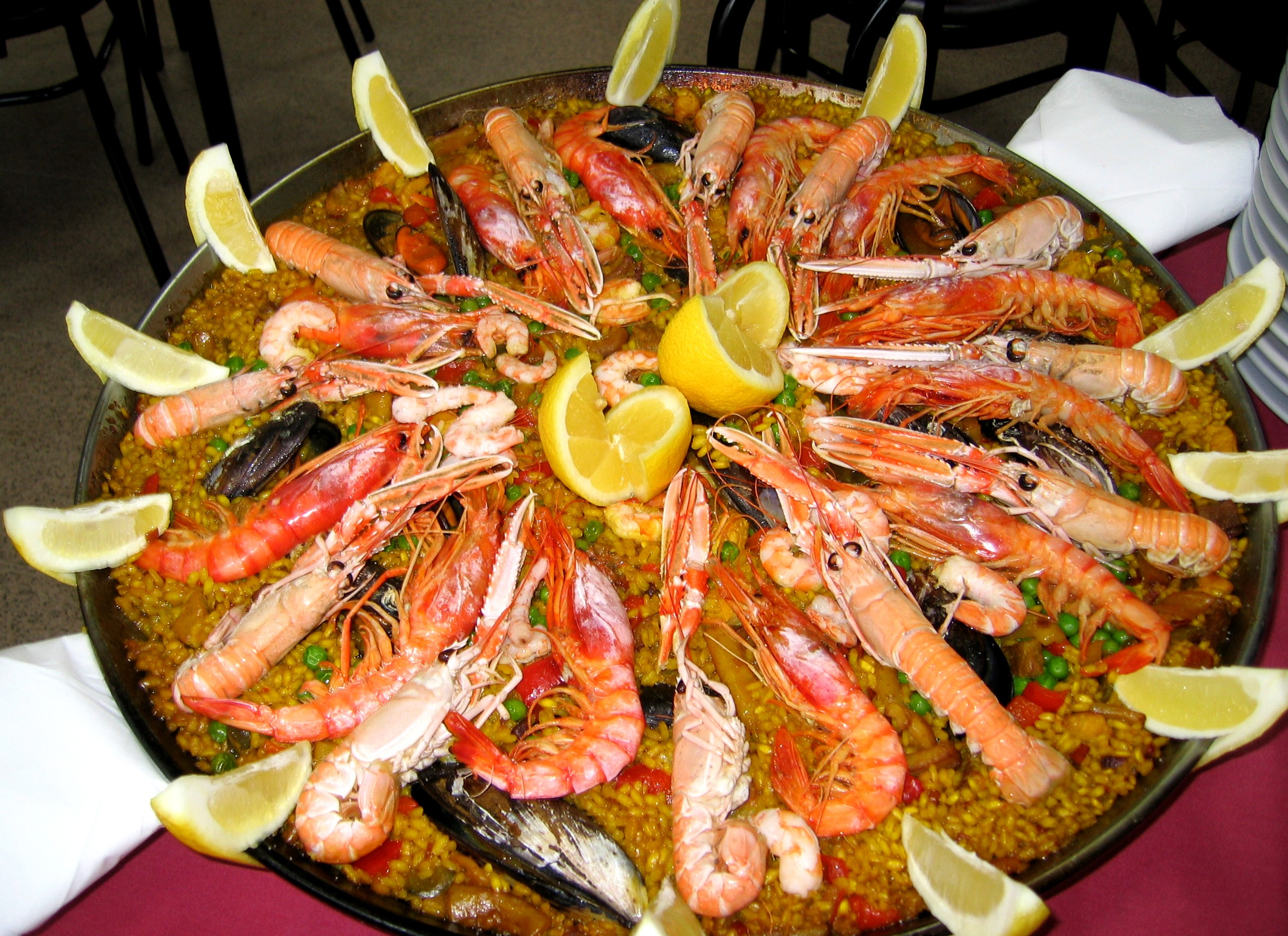
Seafood paella, one of the best-known Spanish dishes

- Gibraltarian cuisine
- Greek cuisine
  - Macedonian cuisine (Greek)
  - Cretan cuisine
  - Cypriot cuisine
  - Cuisine of the Ionian Islands
  - Epirotic cuisine
  - Pontic Greek cuisine
  - Cappadocian Greek cuisine
- Italian cuisine
  - Abruzzese and Molisan cuisine
  - Italian-American cuisine
  - Arbëreshë cuisine
  - Basilicatan (Lucanian) cuisine
  - Calabrian cuisine
  - Corsican cuisine
  - Lazian or Roman
  - Ligurian cuisine
  - Lombard cuisine
    - Mantuan cuisine
  - Neapolitan cuisine
  - Pugliese cuisine
  - Sammarinese cuisine
  - Sardinian cuisine
  - Sicilian cuisine
  - Tuscan cuisine
  - Venetian cuisine
- Maltese cuisine
- Monégasque cuisine
- Occitan cuisine
- Portuguese cuisine
- Spanish cuisine
  - Andalusian cuisine
  - Asturian cuisine
  - Aragonese cuisine
  - Balearic cuisine
  - Basque cuisine
  - Canarian cuisine
  - Cantabrian cuisine
  - Castilian-Leonese cuisine
  - Castilian-Manchego cuisine
  - Catalan cuisine
    - Andorran cuisine
  - Extremaduran cuisine
  - Galician cuisine
  - Leonese cuisine
  - Madrid cuisine
  - Minorcan cuisine
  - Valencian cuisine
- Sephardic Jewish cuisine

==== Western European cuisine ====
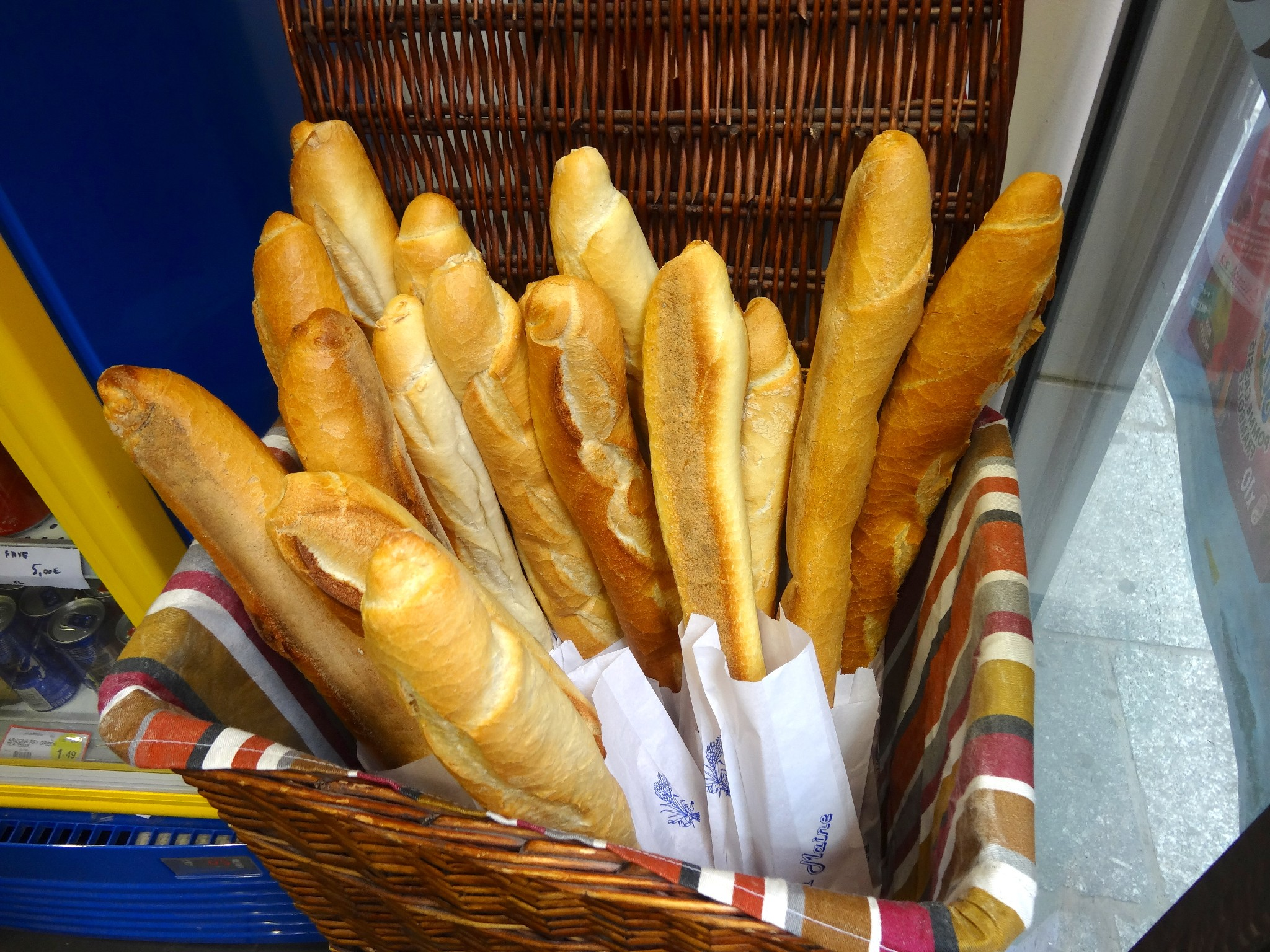
Baguettes, a symbol of French cuisine and culture

- Belgian cuisine
- Dutch cuisine
  - Frisian cuisine
  - Limburgian cuisine
- French cuisine
  - Cajun cuisine
  - Haute cuisine
  - Lyonnaise cuisine
  - Nouvelle cuisine
  - Occitan cuisine
  - Cuisine of Quebec
- Cuisine of Luxembourg

==== British Isles cuisine ====
- Cuisines of the Islands of the North Atlantic (IONA)
  - British cuisine
    - Anglo-Indian cuisine
    - British Chinese cuisine
    - Channel Islands cuisine
    - English cuisine
      - Cornish cuisine
      - Devonian cuisine
      - Dorset cuisine
    - Northern Irish cuisine
    - Scottish cuisine
    - Welsh cuisine
      - Cuisine of Carmarthenshire
      - Cuisine of Ceredigion
      - Cuisine of Gower
      - Cuisine of Monmouthshire
      - Cuisine of Pembrokeshire
  - Irish cuisine

=== Oceanic cuisine ===
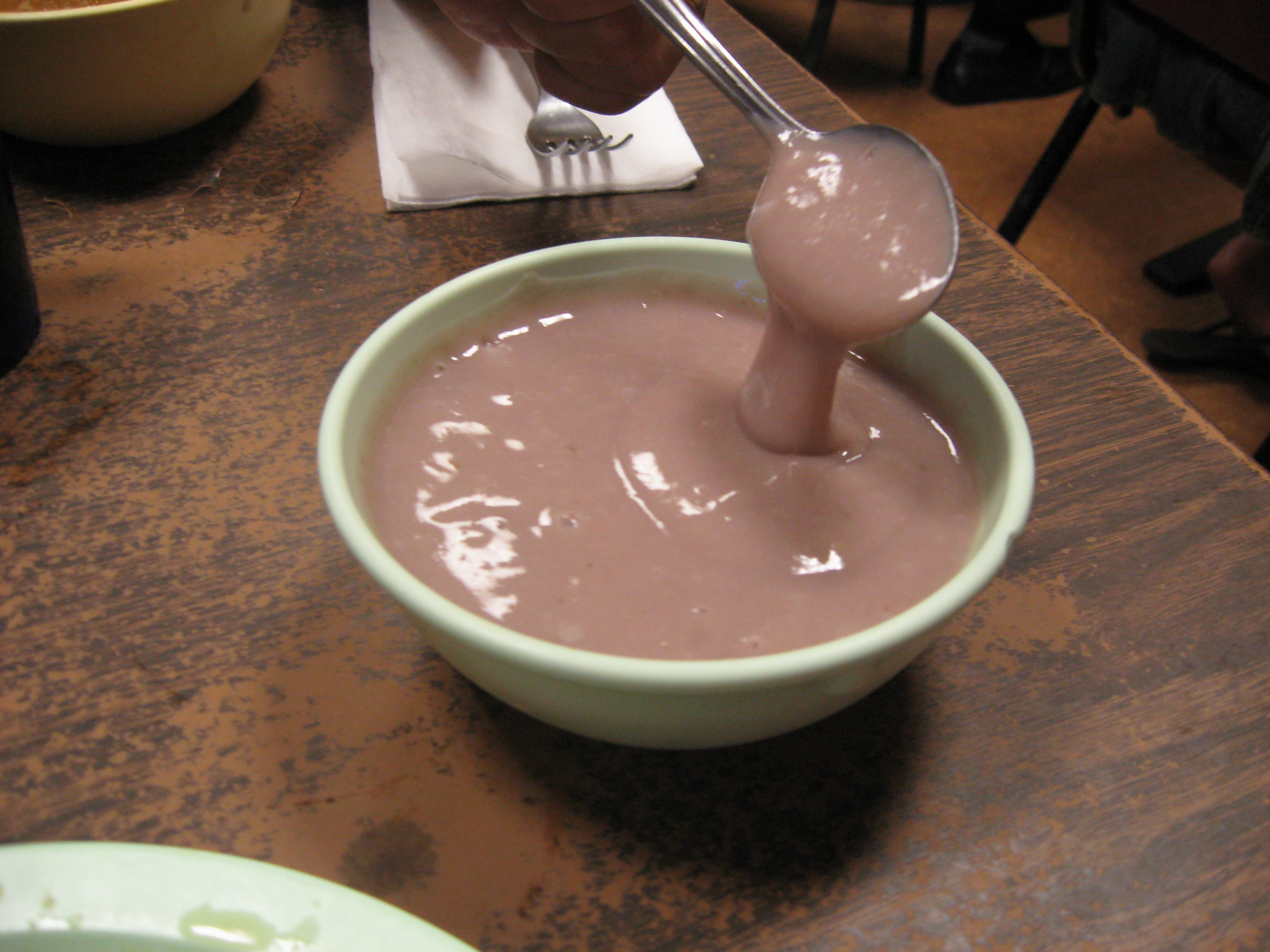
Poi, a staple Polynesian food

- Australasian cuisine
  - Australian cuisine
    - Australian Chinese cuisine
    - Bush tucker
    - Tasmanian cuisine
  - New Zealand cuisine
    - New Zealand Chinese cuisine
- Melanesian cuisine
  - Bougainville cuisine
  - Fijian cuisine
  - New Caledonian cuisine
  - Papua New Guinean cuisine
  - Solomon Islands cuisine
  - Vanuatuan cuisine
- Micronesian cuisine
  - Kiribati cuisine
  - Mariana Islands cuisine
    - Guamanian cuisine
  - Marshallese cuisine
  - Nauruan cuisine
  - Palauan cuisine
- Polynesian cuisine
  - Cook Islands cuisine
  - Hawaiian cuisine
  - Niuean cuisine
  - Pascuense (Easter Island) cuisine
  - Pitcairn Islands cuisine
  - Samoan cuisine
  - French Polynesian cuisine
  - Tongan cuisine
  - Tuvaluan cuisine
  - Wallis and Futuna cuisine

== Cuisine styles ==
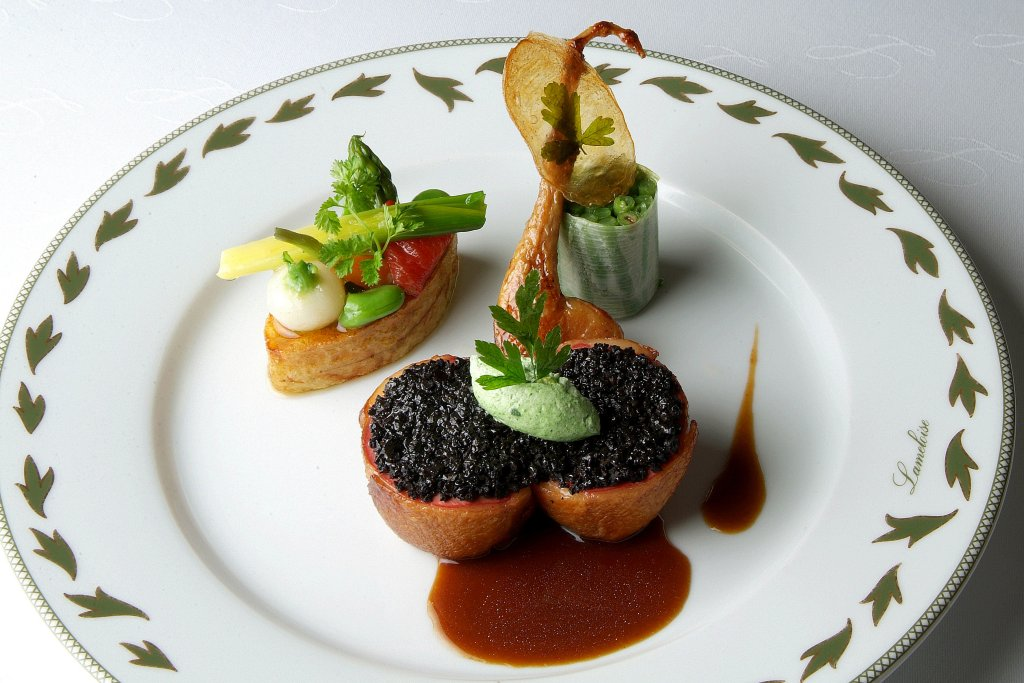
A Jacques Lameloise (a three-star Michelin Guide chef) nouvelle cuisine presentation

- Fast food
- Fusion cuisine
- Haute cuisine
- Molecular gastronomy
  - Note by Note cuisine
- Nouvelle cuisine
- Vegan cuisine
- Vegetarian cuisine
  - Indian vegetarian cuisine
- Street food

== Religious cuisines ==
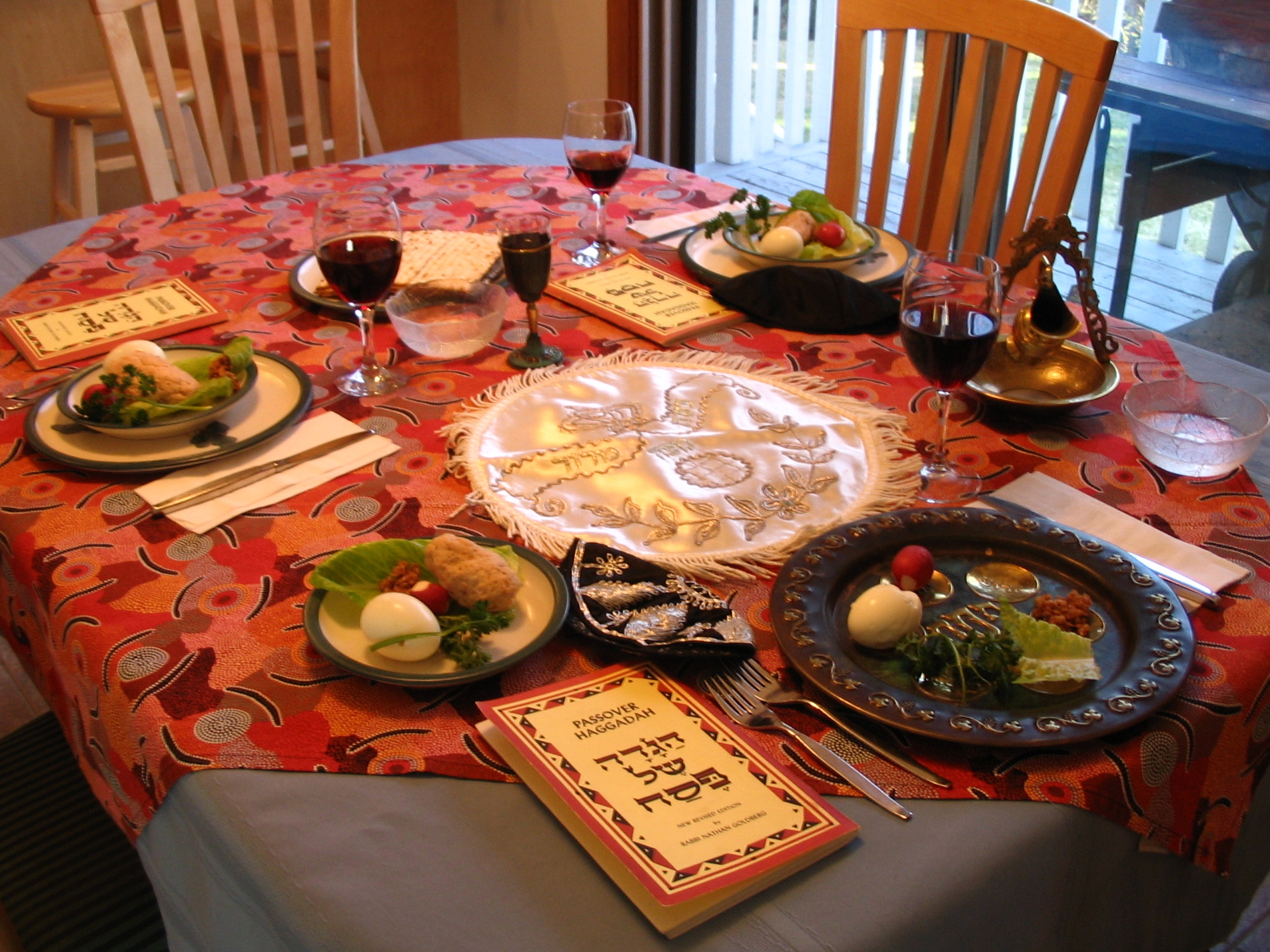
A table set for Seder, a Jewish feast

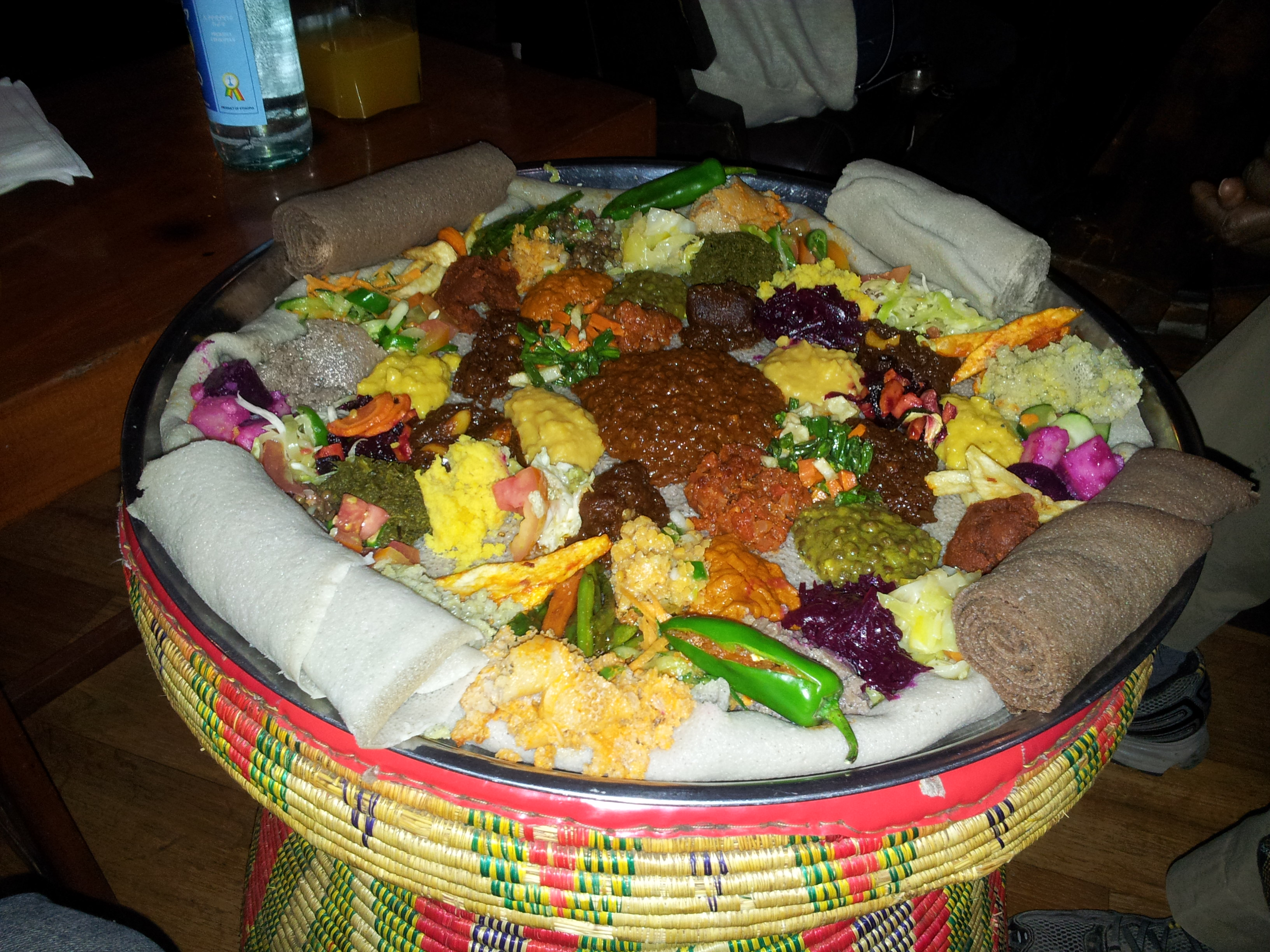
A vegan Ethiopian Yetsom beyaynetu, compatible with Ethiopian Orthodox fasting rules

- Buddhist cuisine
  - Buddhist vegetarianism
  - Korean temple cuisine
- Chinese religious cuisines
  - Chinese Buddhist cuisine
  - Chinese Islamic cuisine
  - Taoist diet
- Christian diet
  - Catholic diet
  - Coptic Orthodox diet
  - Ethiopian Orthodox diet
  - Goan Catholic cuisine
  - Mangalorean Catholic cuisine
  - Mennonite cuisine
- Hindu diet
- Islamic diet
  - Chinese Islamic cuisine
- Jain diet
- Jewish cuisine
  - American Jewish cuisine
  - Ashkenazi Jewish cuisine
  - Bukharan Jewish cuisine
  - Ethiopian Jewish cuisine
  - Mizrahi Jewish cuisine
  - Sephardic Jewish cuisine
  - Syrian Jewish cuisine
- Sikh diet

== Historical cuisines ==
- Ancient Egyptian cuisine
- Ancient Greek cuisine
- Ancient Israelite cuisine
- Ancient Roman cuisine
- Aztec cuisine
- Byzantine cuisine
- Early modern European cuisine
- Futurist cuisine
- Historical Chinese cuisine
- Historical Indian cuisine
- Inca cuisine
- Maya cuisine
- Medieval cuisine
- Ottoman cuisine
- Peasant foods
- Soviet cuisine
- Thirteen Colonies cuisine
