= Mizo cuisine =

Traditional cuisine of the Mizo people of India

Mizo cuisine is the traditional cuisine of the Mizo people of Mizoram, India. Mizos traditionally eat rice as their staple food.

== Overview ==
The cuisine of Mizoram shares characteristics to other regions of Northeast India and North India. Rice is the staple food of Mizoram, while Mizos love to add non-vegetarian ingredients in every dish. Fish, chicken, pork and beef are popular meats among Mizos. Dishes are cooked in any available oil. Meals tend to be blander with less oil and more vegetables. Most Mizos love eating boiled vegetables along with rice but the younger generation tends to like fried and spicy food; food from other cultures are also a popularity among many young Mizo. Rice is known as 'Chaw' and Curry as 'Hme', a popular dish is bai, made from boiling vegetables (the ingredients tend to differ from household to household) with bekang (fermented soybeans similar to Japanese Nattō) or sa-um, a fermented pork, and served with rice. Sawhchiar is another common dish, made of rice and cooked with beef, pork or chicken.

== Dishes ==
The staple food of most of the Mizo people is rice, with meat and vegetables served on the side, ranging from the homely bai, a simple vegetable stew, non veg stew with sesame, garlic, onion and herbs.

=== Side dishes ===
- Bai – combination of several herbs cooked with string beans and edible ferns.
- Rep – smoked meat (fish, chicken, pork or beef) mixed with flavors of chilies, local herbs and fresh leafy greens
- Chhum han – mixed steamed vegetables.
- Hmarcha rawt - tangy and spicy chilli chutney
- Dal
- Bekang - fermented soya beans similar to Japanese Nattō

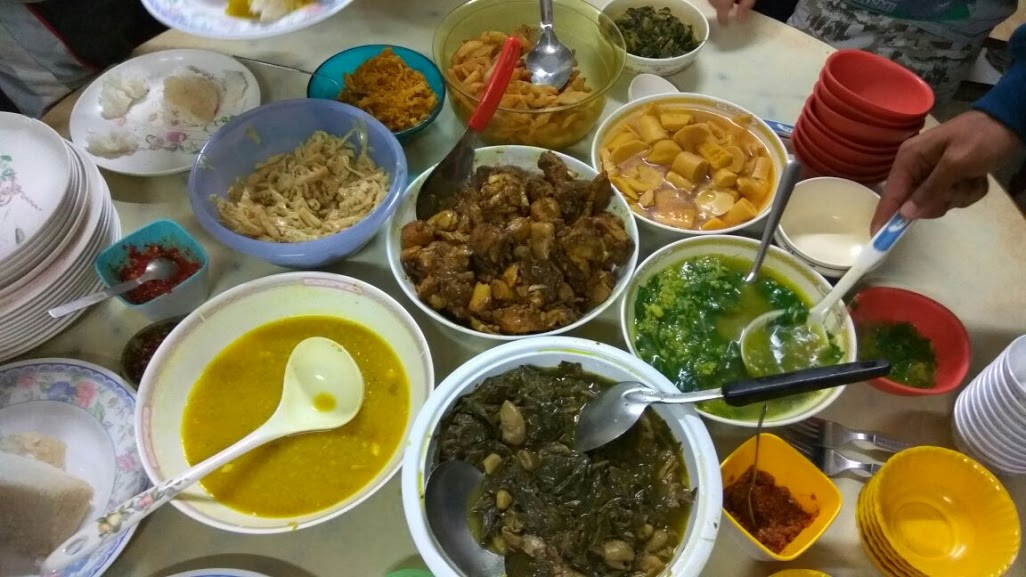
Typical Mizo food including stable rice, bai, meat and hmarcha rawt

=== Lunch ===
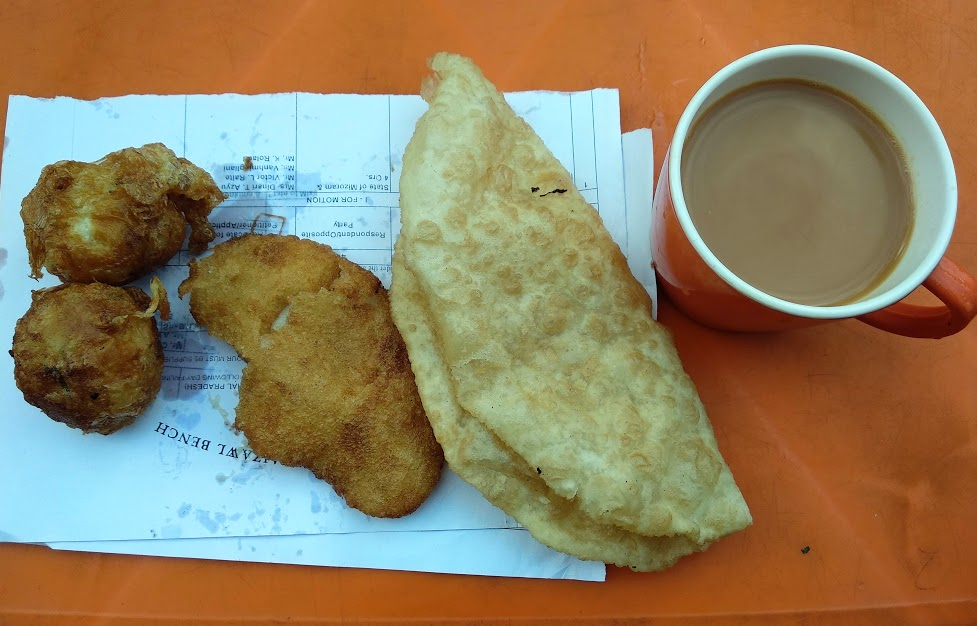
Typical Mizo lunch including chhangban, alu chop, atta and tea

Lunch in a Mizo home differs from house to house. Food eaten in lunch can range from simple biscuits to even noodles and also sometimes "chhangban" (a snack prepared from finely ground sticky rice) which is usually accompanied by kurtai (jaggery) and tea.

Some of the Items eaten during lunch are:

- Sanpiau – Rice porridge mixed with meat, sauce and Mizo spices.
- Chhangban – Sticky local rice bread.
- Artui chhipchhuan chow – Sunny-side-up fried egg with noodles
- Alu chop
- Sawhchiar

=== Fermented dishes ===
- Bekang-um (fermented soybean)
- Sa-um (fermented pork fat)
- Chhi-um (fermented sesame seeds)
- Ai-um (fermented crabs with crushed sesame seeds)
- Aite-um (fermented whole crab)
- Tam-um (fermented mustard leaves)
- Tuai-um (fermented bamboo shoots)

=== Beverages ===
- Zupui
- Zufâng (sweet rice beer)
- Tin-zu (strong undistilled rice beer)
- Rakzu (strong distilled rice beer)
