= Syrian Jewish cuisine =

Cuisine of the Syrian Jews

Syrian Jewish cuisine is the cuisine of Syrian Jews. Although almost all Jewish people left Syria by 2016, their cuisine has been preserved in books and family recipes.

== History and influences ==
Since biblical times there have been Jews in the area comprising modern-day Syria. Syrian Jewish cuisine is distinct from Ashkenazi Jewish cuisine. In fact, Syrian Jewish dishes often differ from those of other Jews because they contain rice, dried fruits and other seasonings not found in other regional Jewish foodway. Because Jews are prohibited to mix meat and dairy, Syrian Jewish cuisine differed from standard Syrian cuisine because it used oil instead of butter or lamb fat in fried foods. After 1492 when the Sephardim were expelled from Spain, many Sephardic Jews came to Syria and brought a few dishes with Spanish names like bastel. Some immigrants from Italy in the seventeenth and eighteenth centuries (the so-called Francos) brought with them Italian dishes such as calsone (a sort of cheese ravioli). These foods were intermixed with the local Syrian Mizrahi and Musta'arabi Jewish cuisine creating new flavors and styles. Syrian Jews also created their own versions of Syrian dishes, by emphasizing fruit and sweet-sour flavors. Distinctively, the Syrian Jews of Aleppo also made heavy use of tamarind, particularly in sauces.

== Elements ==
Characteristic of the Middle East and the Indo-Mediterranean Basin, Syrian Jewish cuisine contains many elements of cuisines from a wide geographic area. Moorish and Iberian elements arrived after Jews were expelled from Spain in 1492. Syrian Jewish merchants trading along the spice route also imported spices from the Far East and land of Persia, making rose water and lime an important addition to their cuisine. Naturally, elements of Syrian Jewish cuisine were adopted by non-Jewish communities in Syria while Syrian Jews also adopted non-Jewish Syrian flavors into their dishes. Syrian Jewish dishes differ in very specific ways from other Syrian cuisines. The addition of cinnamon, cumin and allspice to dishes, as well as the use of Moroccan saffron with Persian olives and preserved lemons help to distinguish the cuisine from standard Syrian foods.

== See also ==
- Arab cuisine
- Syrian cuisine
- Central Asian cuisine
- Israeli cuisine
- Jewish dietary laws
- Levantine cuisine
- Mediterranean cuisine

== Other References ==
- http://www.imageusa.com/index.php/community-articles/442.html?task=view
- Aromas Aleppo Legendary Cuisine Syrian
- SFGate
- http://www.ewtn.com/library/chistory/syriahis.htm
- https://www.amazon.com/Fistful-Lentils-Jennifer-F-Abadi/dp/1558322183#reader_1558322183
- http://www.fistfuloflentils.com/SY_Cooking.html
- Syrian Food and Culture
- https://www.npr.org/2008/04/16/89659889/a-seder-with-a-syrian-flavor
- http://www.cookingjewish.com/node/78
- https://www.nytimes.com/2007/09/05/dining/05book.html
