= Mesoamerican cuisine =

Culinary traditions of Mesoamerica

Mesoamerican cuisine (covering Belize, El Salvador, Guatemala, Honduras, Nicaragua, northern Costa Rica and Mexico) has four main staples: maize (many varieties based on what climate it is grown in), beans, squash and chili. Other plant-based foods used include amaranth, avocado, cassava, cherimoya, chia, chocolate, guava, nanche, pineapple, sapodilla, sweet potatoes, yucca and zapote.

Historically, various methods and techniques were employed to store, prepare and preserve the foods, most of which remain in use today. Hernán Cortés introduced rice and wheat to Mesoamerica, prior to which time milpa (known as the cornfield) was one of the main sources of sustenance.

Some traditional foods featured in the cuisine include atole (a drink made using masa) and chocolate atole (with the addition of chocolate), also known as champurrado. Two classic maize preparations are boiling maize in water and lime, mixing with chili peppers and eating as gruel, and dough preparation for flat cakes, tamales and tortillas. Edible foam is another popular food item, sometimes even regarded as sacred.

While squashes were cooked for food, dried gourds were repurposed for storage or used during battles with embers and chilies, wrapped in leaves and used as chemical warfare.

== History ==
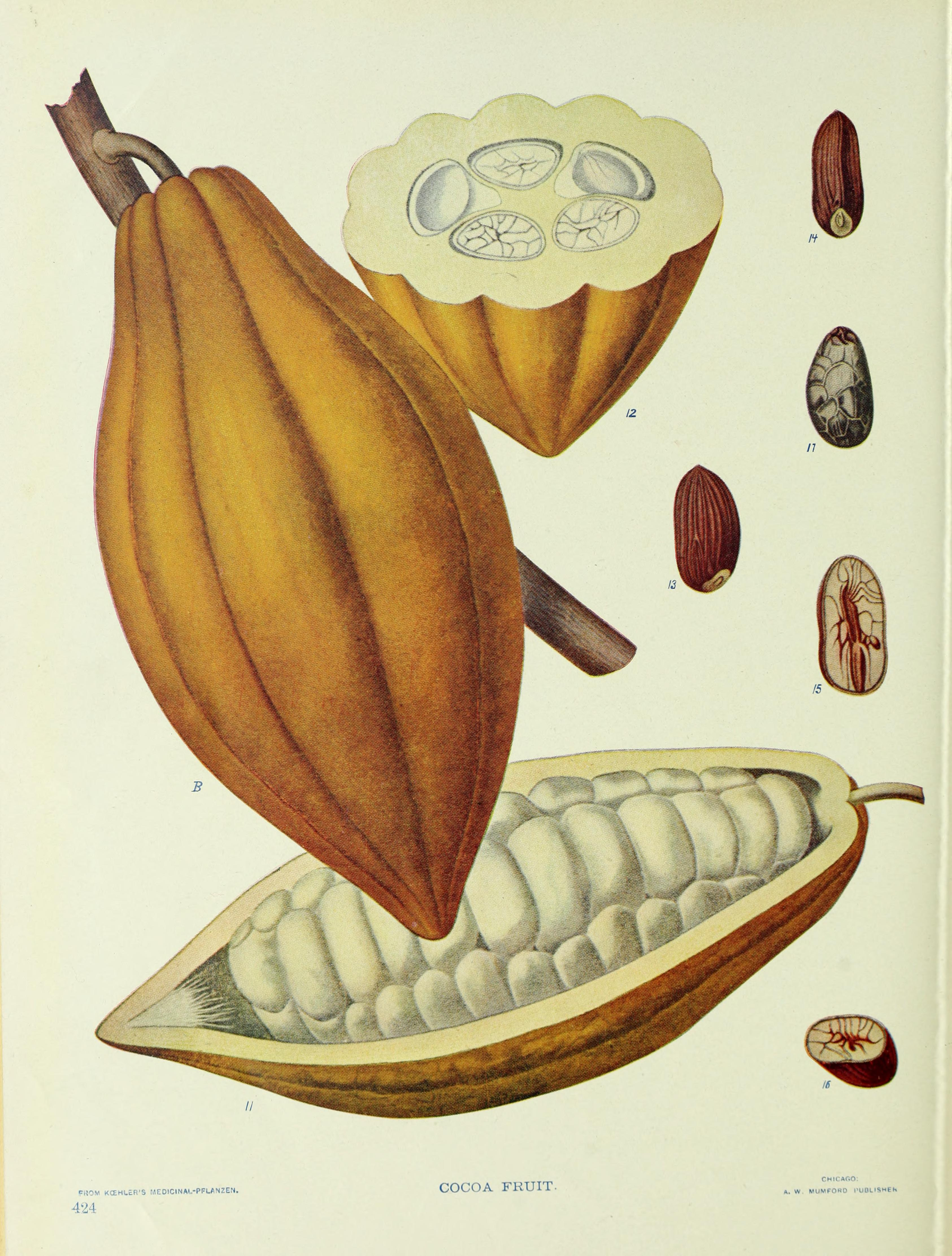
Common cocoa seed that would be used to make hot chocolate

- 7200 BC: use of chilies
- 6700 BC: harvesting and teosinte planting
- 4000 BC: use of squash
- 2000 BC: cultivation began
- 1500 BC: chocolate with the Olmec civilization in Mesoamerica.

== Animals ==
The animals used in Mesoamerican cuisine were mainly dogs, turkeys, deer and the Muscovy duck.

== Chocolate ==
The Mesoamericans began making fermented drinks using chocolate in 450 BC using the cocoa tree. Once sugar was used to sweeten it rather than spices, it gained popularity and was used in feasts. Toasted cacao beans were ground (sometimes with parched corn) and then the powder was mixed with water. This was beaten with a wooden whisk until foamy. Vanilla orchid pods or honey were used as flavor enhancers. Chocolate was also seen as an energy drink and a libido increaser as recorded by Moctezuma II who drank 50 cups a day from a golden goblet.

== See also ==
- List of Mexican dishes
- Belizean cuisine
- Guatemalan cuisine
- Salvadoran cuisine
- Honduran cuisine
- Nicaraguan cuisine
- Costa Rican cuisine
- Mexican cuisine
- Central American cuisine
- Indigenous cuisine of the Americas
