= Hazara cuisine =

Food and cuisine of the Hazara people in central Afghanistan

Hazara cuisine or Hazaragi cuisine (Hazaragi: غذای آزارگی) refers to the food and cuisine of the Hazara people in Afghanistan and western Pakistan (Balochistan province). The food of the Hazara people is strongly influenced by Central Asian, South Asian cuisines and shares similarities with neighboring regional cuisines in Afghanistan and Central Asia. However, there are certain dishes, culinary methods and styles of cooking that are unique to the Hazara people.

The Hazara people have a hospitable dining etiquette. In Hazaragi culture, it is customary to prepare special food for guests, and to honor them with the best seats during meal times. Most Hazaras eat food with their hands, as opposed to using cutlery and dining utensils such as forks, knives, or spoons. The diet of the Hazara people is largely based on the intake of high-protein foods such as meats and dairy products. They use large amounts of oil in their cooking. A typical Hazara meal/dining course normally consists of cooking one type of food or dish, rather than a wide selection. However, in large formal gatherings or during the presence of guests, a variety of foods may be cooked in the household.

Hazara cuisine is largely centred on breads. There are three main types of breads consumed by Hazara people:

- Tawa bread, baked on hot plates
- Tandoor bread, which is baked on a sunken oven known as the "tandoor"
- Nan-buta bread, a thick, brick-sized bread.

Rice is less frequent in rural Hazara cuisine due to its expense. Tea is a popular beverage among the Hazara people. Fruits and vegetables are only consumed when in season.

== Dishes ==
- - Bolani
- - Aushak
- - Mantu
- - Palao
- - Shorwo
- - Yakhni
- - Chapli Kebab
- - Kebab
- - Osh
- - Shir Birinj
- Shir Rogho - Hot milk tea with butter added.
- - Traditional Hazaragi Aash is plain noodles with Kashk/Ayran (yogurt), fresh mint and salt. Also in Hazarajat, a powder called "Pudina" (a plant, closely related to mint that grows only in Bamyan) is added on top.
- Dalda, a dish made of boiled crushed wheat served with melted desi ghee or butter, often with brown fried onions.
- Qurti
- Ogra
- Ashak, a type of traditional Hazara (commonly) with a garlic chive filling.
- Naan Butta
- Changali or Malida, basically a dessert but mostly served with black or green tea for breakfast.
- Halwa e Samanak, also called Halwa e Sia (Sia meaning black) or Surkh, is a mixture of flour, germinated wheat and water which is fried in oil and then simmered for four hours to harden. It tastes sweet even though no sugar is added.
- Aw joshak
- Qabardagh (also called Surk Kada in some regions) is meat, preferably ribs, that is fried with garlic and salt and later steamed.
- Pai'cha ia is a wintertime speciality of boiled cow or sheep parts, which might include the head or/and feet. Onion, garlic, salt, oil and wheat berries are added, sometimes lentils or other legumes are also added. It is put to simmer for hours on low heat. This is very rich in gelatin and minerals.

== See also ==
- Afghan cuisine
- Pashtun cuisine
- Tajik cuisine
