= Cuisine of the Cayman Islands =

Culinary traditions of the Cayman Islands

The Cayman Islands are a group of islands situated in the Caribbean Sea just between Cuba and Honduras. After being colonized first by Jamaica and then by the British, Cayman Islands remained under British dependency since 1962. Traditional Cayman Islands cuisine is very tied to Jamaican cuisine and they also kept British influences in their cooking, but visitors can also find a large variety of international dishes with a local twist. As for traditional dishes, the main ingredients are coconut, plantain, cassava, yams, rice and peas. Jamaican cuisine enriched Cayman's cuisine by offering a large variety of spices such as jerk, curry and other exotic seasonings. The humid soil provides a large variety of exotic fruits and vegetables such as yellow squash, avocados, callaloo (Caribbean spinach), cassava, calabash, spring onions, pineapples, tomatoes, peas, chili, peppers a great range of citrus fruits such as oranges, lemons, limes, grapefruits, bananas and plantains, sweet potatoes, yams and mangoes.

== Dishes and ingredients ==
Cayman Islands cuisine is very similar to Jamaican cuisine and preserves specific British influences. Traditional dishes are frequently prepared with fish, seafood, vegetables and spices. Fish and seafood are the main ingredients for any Cayman dish; the most common are tuna, turtle, snapper, mackerel and mahi-mahi, which are usually prepared with tomato, onion and peppers. The Cayman Islands are considered to be the homeland of the conch and Strombus gigas, a type of conch, has been the staple dish for many years. Conch is served marinated, in salads, in creamy chowders or in stews. Cayman Islanders prefer spicy dishes; a common spicy sauce in the Cayman Islands is chili sauce made of tomatoes, onions, vinegar and peppers. Fish is served for lunch or dinner grilled, marinated, on salads, or stewed, and it is also served for breakfast with ackee, a fruit whose appearance when cooked is similar to scrambled eggs.

The national dish is stewed turtle, but foods like jerk chicken and pork, oxtail, breadfruit, patties, and “fry snapper” are frequently served as well.

== Preparation methods ==
Because fish is the main source of protein for most inhabitants, there are many preparation methods for it as well as for other dishes. Cayman Islands cuisine uses elements from various cooking traditions borrowed from their neighbors and developed from their traditional dishes. Using the right amount of spices for example is essential – either for spicing up the taste or for coloring the dish. The visual attractiveness of the dish is also important, and a balance between colors and proportion differentiates. Each traditional dish has a special cooking method, which is more or less general in all of Cayman Islands regions. Meat is one of the main elements of most Cayman Islands dishes and cured and smoked hams are often parts of delicious dishes.

== Traditions and festivals ==
There are many festivals and traditions held in Cayman Islands. The national holidays include Constitution Day (July 7), New Year's Day (January 1), National Heroes Day (January 23), Discovery Day (May 15), Queen's Birthday (June 12), Remembrance Day (November 11), and Christmas Day (December 25). Festivals like Batabano, Cayfest, Pirates Week and food festivals present an opportunity for district cooks to prepare traditional foods that are not always easily accessible. On national holidays people from Cayman Islands serve traditional dishes which mainly contain turtle, Conch, whelks and other local seafood cooked with coconut milk or oil depending on the method of preparation. Plantain, breadfruit, yams, cassava, coco, rice and beans are also included or served on the side. A delicious dish served in restaurants but especially at Christmas in Caymanian homes is Cayman-style beef which is 'picked' almost like a pulled pork. It is served with a variety of bread and sweet heavy cakes.
