= Cuisine of Commander Islands =

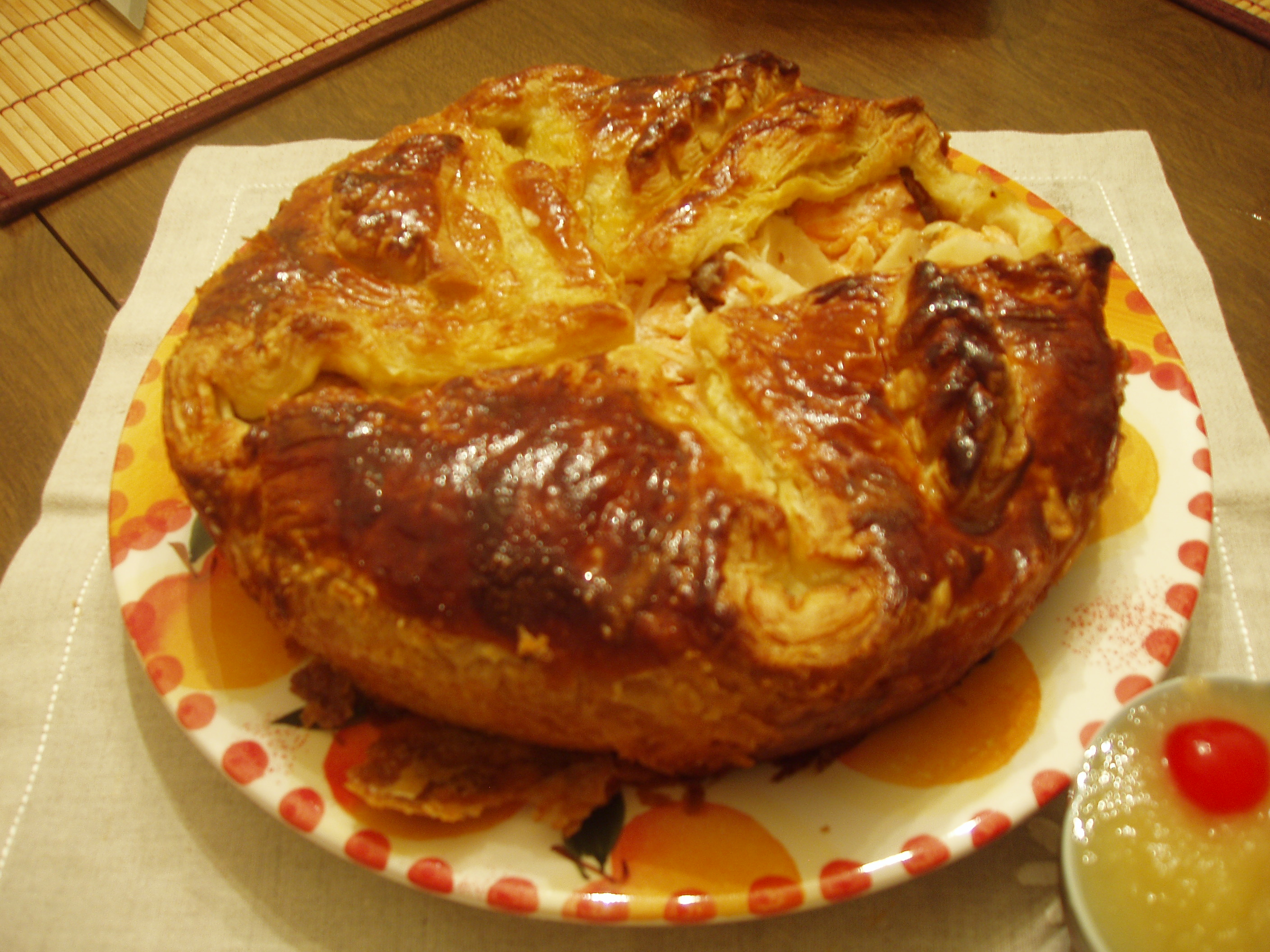
Pirog, the traditional fish pie

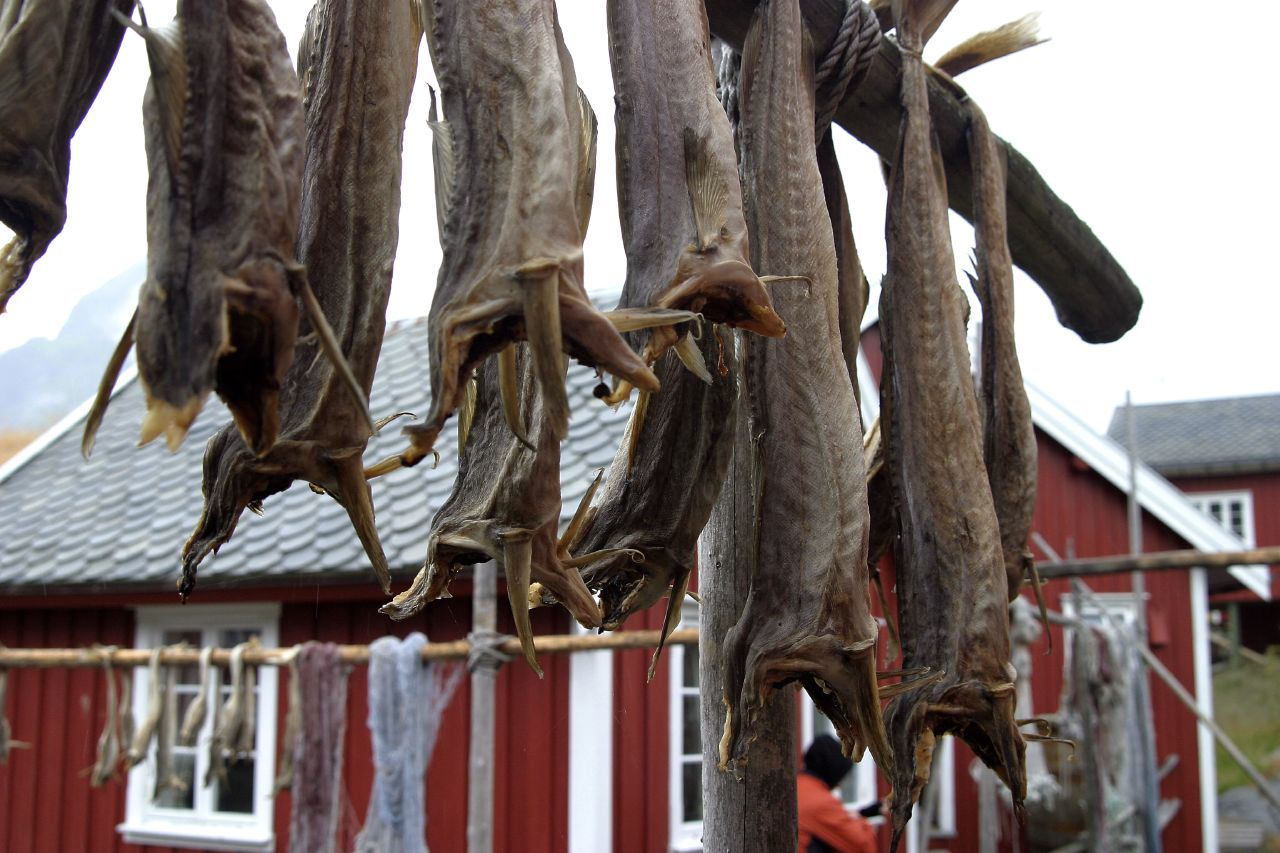
yukola, the dried fish

Cuisine of Commander Islands (Russian: Командорская кухня) is a mixture of traditional Russian cuisine and cuisine of Aleut people, who inhabit the Commander Islands. Commander cuisine is largely based on fish meat, seafood, mushrooms, meat of sea mammals (seals, whales), game meat and vegetable (potato, onion, garlic, carrot) which was brought to the Commander island by Russians.

== Typical dishes ==
Typical dishes include:

=== Fish ===
- Fish snack (Russian: рыбная закуска) - fish pieces with vegetable (onion, pea, capsicum) flavoured with vinegar, salt and pepper.
- Fish pie (Russian: пирог рыбный) - pie (pirog) from dough, fish, onion and potatoes or rice.
- Yukola (Russian: юкола) - dried fish.
- Cod frikadeller (Russian: котлеты из трески) - pan-friend cutlets of minced cod.

=== Snail ===
- Chimigin (Russian: чимигин) - boiled snails, the traditional aleut dish.

=== Seal ===
- Tachi (Russian: тачи) - roasted meat from scapula of northern fur seal.
- Salted flippers (Russian: соленые ласты) - harbor seal or fur seal flippers in salt pickle.
