= List of Netflix exclusive international distribution TV shows =

These series are programs that have aired on other networks where Netflix has bought exclusive distribution rights to stream them in alternate regions on its own platform, although Netflix lists them as Netflix Originals. They may be available on Netflix in their home territory and other markets where Netflix does not have the first-run license, without the Netflix Original label, sometime after their first-run airing on their original broadcaster.

== Drama ==
Title	Genre	Original network	Original region	Netflix exclusive regions	Seasons	Original run	Notes
21 Thunder	Sports drama	CBC	Canada	All other markets	1 season, 8 episodes	2017	(Note: These shows were available at a time as Netflix originals, but have been since removed from the service.)
A Suitable Boy	Drama miniseries	BBC One	United Kingdom	All other markets except US and Canada	6 episodes	2020	(Note: Miniseries)
Bad Blood	Crime drama	Citytv	Canada	Selected territories	2 seasons, 14 episodes	2017–18	
Berlin Station	Crime drama	Epix	United States	Austria, Liechtenstein, Germany and Switzerland	1 season, 10 episodes	2016–19	
Better Call Saul	Dark comedy/Crime drama	AMC	United States	Selected territories	6 seasons, 63 episodes	2015–22	
Black Lightning	Superhero	The CW	United States	All other markets	4 seasons, 58 episodes	2018–21	
Bodyguard	Political thriller	BBC One	United Kingdom	All other markets except Ireland	1 season, 6 episodes	2018	
Borgia	Historical drama	Canal+; ZDF; Sky Italia; ORF	France; Germany; Italy; Czech Republic	US, Canada, UK and Ireland	3 seasons, 38 episodes	2011–14	
Brave New World	Science fiction	Peacock	United States	Selected territories	1 season, 9 episodes	2020	
Champion	Drama	BBC One	United Kingdom	All other markets	1 season, 8 episodes	2023	
Damnation	Period drama	USA Network	United States	All other markets	1 season, 10 episodes	2018	
Dare Me	Drama	USA Network	United States	All other markets	1 season, 10 episodes	2020	
Degrassi: Next Class	Teen drama	Family Channel	Canada	Selected territories	4 seasons, 40 episodes	2016–17	
Designated Survivor (seasons 1–2)	Political drama	ABC	United States	All other markets	2 seasons, 43 episodes	2016–18	
Dirty John	True crime anthology	Bravo (season 1); USA Network (season 2)	United States	All other markets	2 seasons, 16 episodes	2018–20	
Dynasty	Soap opera	The CW	United States	Selected territories	5 seasons, 108 episodes	2017–22	
From Dusk till Dawn	Horror drama	El Rey	United States	Selected territories	3 seasons, 30 episodes	2014–16	
Get Even	Teen thriller	BBC iPlayer	United Kingdom	Selected territories	1 season, 10 episodes	2020	
Ghost Wars	Paranormal action drama	Syfy	United States	All other markets	1 season, 13 episodes	2017	
Glitch (season 1)	Paranormal drama	ABC1	Australia	All other markets except New Zealand and Africa	1 season, 6 episodes	2015	
Greenleaf	Mystery drama	OWN	United States	All other markets except Canada	5 seasons, 60 episodes	2016–20	
Guilt	Murder mystery	Freeform	United States	UK and Ireland	1 season, 10 episodes	2016	
Happy!	Dark comedy/Fantasy crime drama	Syfy	United States	Selected territories in Europe, Asia and Oceania	2 seasons, 18 episodes	2017–18	
Happy Valley	Crime drama	BBC One	United Kingdom	US, Canada	2 seasons, 12 episodes	2014–16	
London Spy	Mystery drama	BBC Two; BBC America	United Kingdom; United States	Selected territories	1 season, 5 episodes	2015	
Lord of the Flies	Drama	BBC iPlayer; BBC One; Stan	United Kingdom; Australia	United States	4 episodes	2026	
Manhunt	True crime	Discovery Channel	United States	All other markets	1 season, 8 episodes	2017	
Marcella	Nordic noir/Crime drama	ITV	United Kingdom	All other markets except Ireland	3 seasons, 24 episodes	2016–20	
Medici	Historical drama	Rai 1	Italy	UK, Ireland, Canada and India	3 seasons, 24 episodes	2016–19	
One of Us Is Lying	Drama	Peacock	United States	Selected territories	2 seasons, 16 episodes	2021–22	
Orphan Black	Science fiction thriller	Space; BBC America	Canada; United States	Selected territories	5 seasons, 50 episodes	2013–17	
Outlander	Historical fantasy drama	Starz	United States	Selected territories	7 seasons, 83 episodes	2014–23	
Paranoid	Crime drama	ITV	United Kingdom	Selected territories	1 season, 8 episodes	2016	
Peaky Blinders	Period crime drama	BBC Two (seasons 1–4); BBC One (seasons 5–6)	United Kingdom	Selected territories	6 seasons, 36 episodes	2013–22	
Penny Dreadful	Gothic horror	Showtime; Sky Atlantic	United States; United Kingdom	Selected territories	3 seasons, 27 episodes	2014–16	
Playing Gracie Darling	Drama	Paramount+	United States	Selected territories	1 season, 6 episodes	2025	
Pose	Drama	FX	United States	Selected territories	3 seasons, 26 episodes	2018–21	
Rebellion	Historical drama	RTÉ One	Ireland	All other markets except Finland and the US	2 seasons, 10 episodes	2016–19	(Note: Rebellion and its sequel Resistance are combined into one series on Netflix)
Red Eye	Thriller	ITV	United Kingdom	Germany	1 season, 6 episodes	2024	
Retribution	Crime drama	BBC One	United Kingdom	All other markets except Ireland and Australia	1 season, 4 episodes	2016	
River	Crime drama	BBC One	United Kingdom	Selected territories	1 season, 6 episodes	2015	
Riverdale	Mystery teen drama	The CW	United States	Selected territories	7 seasons, 137 episodes	2017–23	
Scream	Horror anthology	MTV; VH1	United States	Selected territories	2 seasons, 24 episodes	2015–19	
Secret City	Political mystery thriller	Showcase	Australia	Selected territories	2 seasons, 12 episodes	2016–19	
Shadowhunters	Supernatural drama	Freeform	United States	All other markets	3 seasons, 55 episodes	2016–19	
Shooter	Action drama	USA Network	United States	Selected territories	3 seasons, 25 episodes	2016–18	
Sisters	Family drama	Network Ten	Australia	All other markets	1 season, 7 episodes	2017	
Snowpiercer	Dystopian thriller	TNT	United States	All other markets	3 seasons, 30 episodes	2020–22	
Somewhere Between	Mystery drama	ABC	United States	Selected territories	1 season, 10 episodes	2017	
Southcliffe	Drama	Channel 4	United Kingdom	United States and Canada	1 season, 4 episodes	2013	
Star Trek: Discovery	Space opera	CBS All Access	United States	All other markets except Canada	3 seasons, 42 episodes	2017–21	
Stateless	Drama miniseries	ABC	Australia	All other markets	6 episodes	2020	
Superstition	Southern Gothic/Mystery	Syfy	United States	All other markets	1 season, 12 episodes	2017	
The 100	Dystopian science fiction	The CW	United States	Selected territories	7 seasons, 100 episodes	2014–20	
The Alienist	Period drama	TNT	United States	All other markets except France	2 seasons, 18 episodes	2018–20	
The Defeated	Crime drama	ZDF	Germany	Selected territories	1 season, 8 episodes	2020	
The Expanse	Space opera	Syfy	United States	All other markets except Canada and New Zealand	2 seasons, 23 episodes	2016–17	
The Fall	Crime drama	RTÉ One; BBC Two	Ireland; United Kingdom	US, Canada, Sweden, Norway, Denmark, Finland	3 seasons, 17 episodes	2013–16	
The Frankenstein Chronicles	Period crime drama	ITV Encore	United Kingdom	US and other territories	2 seasons, 12 episodes	2015–17	
The Last Kingdom (season 1)	Historical drama	BBC Two	United Kingdom	Selected territories	1 season, 8 episodes	2015	
The Missing	Psychological drama/Mystery thriller	BBC One; Starz	United Kingdom; United States	The Netherlands, Belgium	3 seasons, 22 episodes	2014–19	
The Mist	Science fiction horror thriller	Spike	United States	All other markets	1 season, 10 episodes	2017	
The Returned	Supernatural drama	A&E	United States	All other markets except Canada	1 season, 10 episodes	2015	
The Sinner	Police procedural anthology	USA Network	United States	All other markets	4 seasons, 32 episodes	2017–21	
The Tourist (season 2)	Drama	BBC One; Stan; ZDF	United Kingdom; Australia; Germany	All other markets	1 season, 6 episodes	2024	
The Unlisted	Science fiction teen drama	ABC TV	Australia	Selected territories	1 season, 15 episodes	2019	
Titans	Superhero	DC Universe (seasons 1–2); HBO Max (seasons 3–4)	United States	All other markets	4 seasons, 49 episodes	2018–23	
Unsolved	True crime	USA Network	United States	All other markets	1 season, 10 episodes	2018	
Van Helsing	Fantasy horror	Syfy	United States	All other markets	5 seasons, 65 episodes	2016–21	
Wanted	Drama	Seven Network	Australia	Selected territories	3 seasons, 18 episodes	2016–18	
Winter Palace	Period drama	RTS	Switzerland	Selected territories	8 episodes	2025	
You (season 1)	Thriller	Lifetime	United States	All other markets	1 season, 10 episodes	2018	

== Comedy ==
Title	Genre	Original network	Original region	Netflix exclusive regions	Seasons	Original run	Notes
Champions	Comedy drama	NBC	United States	Selected territories	1 season, 10 episodes	2018	
Chewing Gum	Sitcom	E4	United Kingdom	All other markets except Ireland	2 seasons, 12 episodes	2015–17	
Crashing	Comedy drama	Channel 4	United Kingdom	All other markets except Ireland	1 season, 6 episodes	2016	
Cuckoo	Sitcom	BBC Three	United Kingdom	All other markets except Ireland	5 seasons, 33 episodes	2012–19	
Derek	Comedy drama	Channel 4	United Kingdom	All other markets except Ireland and the US	3 seasons, 14 episodes	2012–14	
Derry Girls	Sitcom	Channel 4	United Kingdom	Selected territories	3 seasons, 19 episodes	2018–22	
Good Girls	Crime comedy drama	NBC	United States	All other markets	4 seasons, 50 episodes	2018–21	
Great News	Sitcom	NBC	United States	Selected territories	2 seasons, 23 episodes	2017–18	
Marlon	Sitcom	NBC	United States	Selected territories	2 seasons, 20 episodes	2017–18	
Pompidou	Comedy	BBC Two	United Kingdom	Canada	1 season, 6 episodes	2015	
Sick Note	Sitcom	Sky One	United Kingdom	Worldwide except UK, Ireland, Greece and New Zealand	2 seasons, 14 episodes	2017–18	
Spotless	Dark comedy thriller	Canal+	France	Selected territories	1 season, 10 episodes	2015	
The Good Place	Fantasy sitcom	NBC	United States	Selected territories	4 seasons, 50 episodes	2016–20	
The Indian Detective	Crime comedy	CTV	Canada	Selected territories	1 season, 4 episodes	2017	
White Gold	Sitcom	BBC Two	United Kingdom	All other markets except Ireland	2 seasons, 12 episodes	2017–19	
Why Are You Like This	Comedy	ABC TV	Australia	Selected territories	1 season, 6 episodes	2018–21	
Workin' Moms	Sitcom	CBC	Canada	All other markets	7 seasons, 83 episodes	2017–23	
You Me Her	Romantic comedy	Audience Network	United States	All other markets except Canada	5 seasons, 50 episodes	2016–20	

== Kids & family ==
Title	Genre	Original network	Original region	Netflix exclusive regions	Seasons	Original run	Notes
Creeped Out	Children horror/fantasy drama	CBBC; Family Channel	United Kingdom; Canada	Selected territories	2 seasons, 23 episodes	2017–19	
Erin & Aaron	Comedy	Nickelodeon	United States	Selected territories	1 season, 12 episodes	2023	
Lost & Found Music Studios	Musical teen drama	Family Channel	Canada	Selected territories	2 seasons, 27 episodes	2016–17	
Mako Mermaids: An H2O Adventure	Children/teen fantasy	Network Ten (season 1); Eleven (season 2–3)	Australia	Selected territories	3 seasons, 52 episodes	2013–16	
MaveriX	Sports drama	ABC Me	Australia	All other markets except Australia	1 season, 10 episodes	2022	
Power Rangers (season 28)	Science fiction/Superhero	Nickelodeon	United States	US, Canada, UK, Australia, and New Zealand	1 season, 22 episodes	2021	
Pup Academy	Children comedy	Disney Channel; TVOntario	United States; Canada	Worldwide	2 seasons, 19 episodes	2019	
ReBoot: The Guardian Code	Science fiction teen drama	YTV	Canada	All other markets	2 seasons, 20 episodes	2018	
Rebel Cheer Squad: A Get Even Series	Teen thriller	BBC iPlayer	United Kingdom	Selected territories	1 season, 8 episodes	2022	
Some Assembly Required	Teen sitcom	YTV	Canada	All other markets	3 seasons, 57 episodes	2014–16	
Teletubbies (seasons 6–7)	Preschool/Educational	BBC Two (seasons 1–5); CBeebies (seasons 6–9)	United Kingdom	Selected territories	1 season, 26 episodes	2015–16	
That Girl Lay Lay	Children comedy	Nickelodeon	United States	Selected territories	2 seasons, 26 episodes	2021–23	
The InBESTigators	Children comedy	ABC Me	Australia	Selected territories	2 seasons, 20 episodes	2019	

== Animation ==
=== Adult animation ===
Title	Genre	Original network	Original region	Netflix exclusive regions	Seasons	Language	Original run	Notes
Close Enough	Animated sitcom	HBO Max	United States	Selected territories	2 seasons, 16 episodes	English	2020–21	
Exorcist	Comedy drama	Showmax	Poland	Selected territories	3 seasons, 39 episodes	Polish	2016–18	
Final Space	Science fiction/Comedy drama	TBS	United States	Selected territories	3 seasons, 36 episodes	English	2018–21	
Mike Tyson Mysteries	Adventure comedy	Adult Swim	United States	Canada	4 seasons, 70 episodes	English	2014–20	
Pacific Heat	Animated sitcom	The Comedy Channel	Australia	Canada, Ireland, UK, US	1 season, 13 episodes	English	2016	
Scissor Seven	Comedy, wuxia	Bilibili	China	Selected territories	5 seasons, 54 episodes	Mandarin	2018–24	

=== Anime ===
Title	Original network	Original region	Netflix exclusive regions	Seasons	Language	Original run	Notes
Ajin: Demi-Human	JNN (MBS, TBS, CBC), BS-TBS	Japan	All other markets	2 seasons, 26 episodes	Japanese	2016	
Back Street Girls -Gokudols-	Tokyo MX, BS11, MBS, AT-X	Japan	Selected territories	1 season, 10 episodes	Japanese	2018	
Beastars	Fuji TV, TNC, Kansai TV, THK, UHB, BS Fuji	Japan	All other markets	3 seasons, 48 episodes	Japanese	2019–26	
Blue Box	JNN (TBS)	Japan	Selected territories	1 season, 25 episodes	Japanese	2024–	Season 2 ongoing
Blue Period	JNN (MBS, TBS), BS Asahi, AT-X	Japan	All other markets	1 season, 12 episodes	Japanese	2021	
BNA: Brand New Animal	Fuji TV, Kansai TV, THK, TNC, UHB, ABA, BS Fuji	Japan	All other markets	1 season, 12 episodes	Japanese	2020	
Carole & Tuesday	Fuji TV, TNC, Kansai TV, THK, UHB, BS Fuji	Japan	All other markets	2 parts, 24 episodes	Japanese	2019	
Children of the Whales	Tokyo MX, Sun TV, KBS Kyoto, BS11	Japan	All other markets	1 season, 12 episodes	Japanese	2017	
Cyborg 009: Call of Justice	DVD release	Japan	All other markets	1 season, 12 episodes	Japanese	2017	
Delicious in Dungeon	Tokyo MX, SUN, KBS Kyoto, TV Aichi, AT-X, BS11	Japan	All other markets	1 season, 24 episodes	Japanese	2024–	Season 2 due to premiere in October 2027
Detective Conan: The Culprit Hanzawa	Tokyo MX, ytv, BS Nippon	Japan	All other markets	1 season, 12 episodes	Japanese	2022	
Detective Conan: Zero's Tea Time	Tokyo MX, ytv, BS Nippon	Japan	All other markets	1 season, 6 episodes	Japanese	2022	
Dragon Pilot: Hisone and Masotan	Tokyo MX, BS Fuji, GBS, MBS, AT-X	Japan	All other markets	1 season, 12 episodes	Japanese	2018	
Drifting Dragons	Fuji TV, Kansai TV, THK, TNC, UHB, BS Fuji, RAB, AT-X	Japan	All other markets	1 season, 12 episodes	Japanese	2020	
Edens Zero	Nippon TV, Tokyo MX	Japan	All other markets	1 season, 25 episodes	Japanese	2021	
Fate/Apocrypha	Tokyo MX, BS11, GTV, GYT, MBS	Japan	All other markets	1 season, 25 episodes	Japanese	2017	
Fate/Extra Last Encore	Tokyo MX, BS11, MBS, GTV, GYT	Japan	Selected territories	1 season, 13 episodes	Japanese	2018	
Forest of Piano	NHK	Japan	All other markets	2 seasons, 24 episodes	Japanese	2018–19	
Glitter Force	TV Asahi	Japan	All other markets	2 seasons, 40 episodes	English	2012–13	
Glitter Force Doki Doki	TV Asahi	Japan	All other markets	2 seasons, 30 episodes	English	2013–14	
Godzilla Singular Point	Tokyo MX, Sun TV, KBS Kyoto, BS11	Japan	All other markets	1 season, 13 episodes	Japanese	2021	
Great Pretender	Fuji TV, TNC, Kansai TV, THK, UHB, BS Fuji	Japan	Selected territories	2 seasons, 23 episodes	Japanese	2020	
Hi Score Girl	Tokyo MX, BS11, Aomori TV, MBS, AT-X, SBS Shizuoka	Japan	Selected territories	2 seasons, 24 episodes	Japanese	2018–19	
ID-0	Tokyo MX, Sun TV, KBS Kyoto, BS11	Japan	All other markets	1 season, 12 episodes	Japanese	2017	
Ingress: The Animation	Fuji TV, Kansai TV, THK, TNC, UHB, BS Fuji	Japan	All other markets	1 season, 11 episodes	Japanese	2018	
JoJo's Bizarre Adventure (season 5)	Tokyo MX, BS11, MBS	Japan	All other markets	1 season, 38 episodes	Japanese	2022	
Kabaneri of the Iron Fortress: The Battle of Unato	Released as a film	Japan	All other markets	3 episodes	Japanese	2019	
Kakegurui	Tokyo MX, MBS, BS11, RKB, TV Aichi, BS Nippon	Japan	All other markets	2 seasons, 24 episodes	Japanese	2017–19	
Knights of Sidonia	MBS, TBS, CBC, BS-TBS, AT-X	Japan	All other markets	2 seasons, 24 episodes	Japanese	2014–15	
Komi Can't Communicate	TV Tokyo, TVO, TV Aichi	Japan	All other markets	1 season, 24 episodes	Japanese	2021–22	
Kuromukuro	AT-X, Tokyo MX, BS11, Sun TV, KBS Kyoto, TUT	Japan	All other markets	2 seasons, 26 episodes	Japanese	2016	
Last Hope	Tokyo MX, MBS, BS11	Japan	All other markets	2 seasons, 26 episodes	Japanese	2018	
Little Witch Academia	Tokyo MX, BS11, Kansai TV	Japan	All other markets	2 seasons, 25 episodes	Japanese	2017	
Magi: Adventure of Sinbad	JNN (TBS, MBS, CBC), BS-TBS	Japan	All other markets	1 season, 13 episodes	Japanese	2016	
My Happy Marriage	Tokyo MX, SUN, KBS Kyoto, TV Aichi, AT-X, BS11	Japan	All other markets	2 seasons, 29 episodes	Japanese	2023–26	
Pokémon Horizons: The Series	TV Tokyo	Japan	United States	1 season, 45 episodes	Japanese	2023–24	
Pokémon Horizons – The Search for Laqua (season 2)	TV Tokyo	Japan	United States	1 season, 44 episodes	Japanese	2024–25	
Pokémon Horizons – Rising Hope (season 3)	TV Tokyo	Japan	United States	1 season, 47 episodes	Japanese	2025–26	
Pokémon Horizons – Wonders Ahead (season 4)	TV Tokyo	Japan	United States	TBA	Japanese	2027	Due to premiere on February 27, 2027
Pokémon Journeys: The Series	TV Tokyo	Japan	United States	1 season, 48 episodes	Japanese	2019–20	
Pokémon Master Journeys: The Series	TV Tokyo	Japan	United States	1 season, 42 episodes	Japanese	2020–21	
Pokémon: To Be a Pokémon Master	Released as part of Pokémon Ultimate Journeys: The Series	Japan	United States	1 season, 12 episodes	Japanese	2022–23	
Pokémon Ultimate Journeys: The Series	TV Tokyo	Japan	United States	1 season, 42 episodes	Japanese	2021–22	
Pretty Guardian Sailor Moon Cosmos The Movie	Theatrical release	Japan	Worldwide except Japan	2 parts	Japanese	2023	(Note: Television film)
Pretty Guardian Sailor Moon Eternal The Movie	Theatrical release	Japan	Worldwide except Japan	2 parts	Japanese	2021	
Ranma ½	NNS (Nippon TV)	Japan	All other markets	2 seasons, 24 episodes	Japanese	2024–	Season 3 ongoing
Revisions	Fuji TV, TNC, Kansai TV, THK, UHB, BS Fuji	Japan	All other markets	1 season, 12 episodes	Japanese	2019	
Sakamoto Days	TV Tokyo	Japan	All other markets	1 season, 22 episodes	Japanese	2025–	Season 2 due to premiere in January 2027
Shaman King	TV Tokyo, TVO, TV Aichi, TSC, TVh, TVQ, BS TV Tokyo, BBC, AT-X	Japan	All other markets	1 season, 52 episodes	Japanese	2021–22	
Sirius the Jaeger	Tokyo MX, BS11, TUT	Japan	Selected territories	1 season, 12 episodes	Japanese	2018	
Sparks of Tomorrow	Tokyo MX, BS11, ABC TV, TV Aichi	Japan	Selected territories	1 season, 13 episodes	Japanese	2026	
Steel Ball Run: JoJo's Bizarre Adventure	Released as a stand-alone series	Japan	All other markets	1 season, 2 episode	Japanese	2026	Season ongoing
Teasing Master Takagi-san (season 2)	Tokyo MX, AT-X, GYT	Japan	All other markets	1 season, 12 episodes	Japanese	2019	
The Fragrant Flower Blooms with Dignity	Tokyo MX, GYT, GTV, MBS, BS11, AT-X	Japan	All other markets	1 season, 13 episodes	Japanese	2025	
The Ramparts of Ice	JNN (TBS)	Japan	All other markets	1 season, 14 episodes	Japanese	2026	Season 2 ongoing
The Seven Deadly Sins	JNN (TBS, MBS) (season 1–3); TV Tokyo, BS TV Tokyo, AT-X (season 4–5)	Japan	All other markets	5 seasons, 100 episodes	Japanese	2015–21	
The Seven Deadly Sins: Four Knights of the Apocalypse	JNN (TBS, MBS)	Japan	All other markets	2 seasons, 36 episodes	Japanese	2023–24	
The Summer Hikaru Died	Nippon TV	Japan	All other markets	1 season, 12 episodes	Japanese	2025	
Thunder 3	Fuji TV (+Ultra)	Japan	All other markets	1 season, 12 episodes	Japanese	2026	
Thus Spoke Kishibe Rohan	DVD & theatrical release	Japan	All other markets	4 episodes	Japanese	2017–19	
Ultramarine Magmell	Tokyo MX, BS Fuji	Japan	All other markets	1 season, 13 episodes	Japanese	2019	
Uncle from Another World	Tokyo MX, SUN, KBS Kyoto, TV Aichi, AT-X, BS11	Japan	All other markets	1 season, 13 episodes	Japanese	2022–23	
Violet Evergarden	Tokyo MX, TV Aichi, ABC, BS11, HTB	Japan	All other markets	1 season, 13 episodes	Japanese	2018	

=== Kids & family ===
Title	Genre	Original network	Original region	Netflix exclusive regions	Seasons	Language	Original run	Notes
Beat Bugs	Children's television series	7TWO	Australia	All other markets	3 seasons, 52 episodes	English	2016–18	
Bottersnikes & Gumbles	Children's television series	7TWO	Australia	Selected territories	2 seasons, 52 episodes	English	2016–17	
Chip and Potato	Children's television series	Family Jr.	Canada	Selected territories	4 seasons, 32 episodes	English	2019–22	
Danger Mouse	Action adventure	CBBC	United Kingdom	Selected territories	2 seasons, 50 episodes	English	2015–19	
Daily Fables	Children's television series	NOS	Netherlands	Selected territories	1 season, 4 episodes	Dutch	2018	
H_{2}O: Mermaid Adventures	Children's television series	France Télévisions; ZDF	France; Germany	Selected territories	2 seasons, 26 episodes	English	2015	
Inspector Gadget	Action adventure	Teletoon	Canada	US and Portugal	4 seasons, 52 episodes	English	2015–18	
Karate Sheep	Animated comedy	Gulli	France	Selected territories	2 seasons, 26 episodes	No dialogue	2022–23	
Kazoops!	Children's television series	ABC	Australia	Selected territories	3 seasons, 26 episodes	English	2016–17	
Oggy and the Cockroaches: Next Generation	Animated comedy	Gulli	France	Selected territories	1 season, 13 episodes	No dialogue	2022	
Puffin Rock	Children's television series	RTÉjr	Ireland	All other markets except the UK	2 seasons, 26 episodes	English	2015–16	
Rabbids Invasion (season 4)	Animated comedy	France 3	France	Selected territories	1 season, 26 episodes	French	2018–19	
Robozuna	Children's television series	CITV	United Kingdom	Selected territories	2 seasons, 20 episodes	English	2018–19	
Shaun the Sheep: Adventures from Mossy Bottom	Animated comedy	CBBC	United Kingdom	Selected territories	1 season, 10 episodes	English	2020	
The Fairly OddParents: A New Wish	Animated comedy	Nickelodeon	United States	All other markets except the United States	2 seasons, 20 episodes	English	2024	
Treehouse Detectives	Children's television series	KBS	South Korea	All other markets	2 seasons, 20 episodes	Korean	2018	
Wakfu	Fantasy adventure	France 3	France	Worldwide	3 seasons, 65 episodes	French	2008–17	

== Non-English language scripted ==
=== Catalan ===
Title	Genre	Original network	Original region	Netflix exclusive regions	Seasons	Original run	Notes
If I Hadn't Met You	Fantasy	TV3	Spain	Selected territories	1 season, 10 episodes	2018	
Merlí	Drama	TV3	Spain	Latin America and the US	3 seasons, 40 episodes	2015–18	
Merlí: Sapere Aude	Drama	Movistar+	Spain	Selected territories	2 seasons, 16 episodes	2019–21	
The Hockey Girls	Comedy	TV3	Spain	Selected territories	1 season, 13 episodes	2019	
Welcome to the Family	Dark comedy	TV3	Spain	Selected territories	1 season, 13 episodes	2018	

=== Danish ===
Title	Genre	Original network	Original region	Netflix exclusive regions	Seasons	Original run	Notes
Families Like Ours	Drama	TV 2	Denmark	Selected territories	7 episodes	2024	
Rita	Comedy drama	TV 2	Denmark	All other markets	5 seasons, 40 episodes	2012–20	
Warrior	Crime drama	TV 2	Denmark	Selected territories	1 season, 6 episodes	2018	

=== Dutch ===
Title	Genre	Original network	Original region	Netflix exclusive regions	Seasons	Original run	Notes
13 Commandments	Crime drama	VTM	Belgium	Selected territories	1 season, 13 episodes	2017	
Hotel Beau Séjour	Mystery drama	Eén	Belgium	Selected territories	1 season, 10 episodes	2017	
Tabula Rasa	Psychological thriller	Eén	Belgium	Selected territories	1 season, 9 episodes	2017	
The Twelve	Drama	Eén	Belgium	Selected territories	1 season, 10 episodes	2019	
Thieves of the Wood	Historical drama	VTM	Belgium	Selected territories	1 season, 10 episodes	2019	
Toon	Comedy drama	KPN	The Netherlands	Selected territories	2 seasons, 16 episodes	2016–17	
Two Summers	Thriller	Eén	Belgium	Selected territories	1 season, 6 episodes	2022	
Under Fire	Drama	Eén	Belgium	Selected territories	1 season, 10 episodes	2021	

=== French ===
Title	Genre	Original network	Original region	Netflix exclusive regions	Seasons	Original run	Notes
A Very Secret Service	Espionage parody	Arte	France	All other markets	2 seasons, 24 episodes	2015–18	
Ad Vitam	Science fiction	Arte	France	Selected territories	1 season, 6 episodes	2018	
Black Butterflies	Thriller	Arte	France	All other markets	6 episodes	2022	
Black Spot	Crime drama	France 2	France	Selected territories	2 seasons, 16 episodes	2017–19	
Call My Agent!	Comedy drama	France 2	France	Selected territories	4 seasons, 24 episodes	2015–20	
Can You Hear Me?	Comedy drama	Télé-Québec	Canada	Selected territories	2 seasons, 20 episodes	2018–20	
Cannabis	Crime drama	Arte	France	All other markets	1 season, 6 episodes	2015	
Inhuman Resources	Crime drama	Arte	France	Selected territories	1 season, 6 episodes	2020	
La Mante	Crime thriller	TF1	France	All other markets	1 season, 6 episodes	2017	
Mythomaniac	Comedy drama	Arte	France	Selected territories	2 seasons, 12 episodes	2019–20	
No Second Chance	Thriller	TF1	France	Selected territories	1 season, 6 episodes	2015	
Summer '36	Period piece	RTL-TVI	Belgium	Selected territories	6 episodes	2026	
The Break	Police procedural	La Une	Belgium	Selected territories	2 seasons, 20 episodes	2016–18	
The Chalet	Thriller	France 2	France	Selected territories	1 season, 6 episodes	2018	
The Coyotes	Thriller	RTBF	Belgium	Selected territories	6 episodes	2021	
The Forest	Thriller	France 3	France	All other markets	1 season, 6 episodes	2017	
The Frozen Dead	Crime drama	M6	France	Selected territories	1 season, 6 episodes	2017	
Twice Upon a Time	Drama	Arte	France	Selected territories	1 season, 4 episodes	2019	
Unit 42	Crime drama	RTBF	Belgium	Selected territories	1 season, 10 episodes	2017	
Women at War	Drama	TF1	France	Selected territories	8 episodes	2022	

=== German ===
Title	Genre	Original network	Original region	Netflix exclusive regions	Seasons	Original run	Notes
Babylon Berlin	Period drama	Sky Deutschland	Germany	US and Canada	3 seasons, 28 episodes	2017–20	
Charité	Period drama	ARD	Germany	Selected territories	1 season, 6 episodes	2017	
Charité at War	Period drama	Das Erste	Germany	Selected territories	1 season, 6 episodes	2019	
New Heights	Drama	SRF 1	Switzerland	Selected territories	1 season, 8 episodes	2021	
NSU German History X	Historical drama	ARD	Germany	Selected territories	1 season, 3 episodes	2016	
Oktoberfest: Beer & Blood	Historical drama	ARD; Das Erste	Germany	Selected territories	6 episodes	2020	
The Same Sky	Period drama	ZDF	Germany	Selected territories	1 season, 6 episodes	2016	

=== Hebrew ===
Title	Genre	Original network	Original region	Netflix exclusive regions	Seasons	Original run	Notes
Black Space	Thriller	Channel 13	Israel	Selected territories	1 season, 8 episodes	2020	
Fauda	Espionage thriller	yes	Israel	All other markets except France and Latin America	5 seasons, 59 episodes	2016–26	
Shtisel (season 3)	Drama	yes	Israel	Selected territories	1 season, 9 episodes	2021	
The Beauty Queen of Jerusalem	Drama	yes	Israel	Selected territories	2 seasons, 36 episodes	2021–23	
The Girl from Oslo	Drama thriller	HOT/TV2	Israel/Norway	Selected territories	1 season, 10 episodes	2021	
When Heroes Fly	Thriller	Keshet 12	Israel	Selected territories	1 season, 10 episodes	2018	

=== Italian ===
Title	Genre	Original network	Original region	Netflix exclusive regions	Seasons	Original run	Notes
Call Me Francis	Drama	Canale 5	Italy	40 territories outside Europe	1 season, 4 episodes	2016	
Carlo & Malik	Police procedural	Rai 1	Italy	Selected territories	1 season, 12 episodes	2018	
The Trial	Crime drama	Canale 5	Italy	Selected territories	1 season, 8 episodes	2019	

=== Japanese ===
Title	Genre	Original network	Original region	Netflix exclusive regions	Seasons	Original run	Notes
Final Fantasy XIV: Dad of Light	Drama	MBS, TBS	Japan	All other markets	1 season, 8 episodes	2017	
Golden Kamuy −The Hunt of Prisoners in Hokkaido−	Action	Wowow	Japan	All other markets	1 season, 9 episodes	2024	
Informa	Crime thriller	Kansai TV	Japan	All other markets	1 season, 10 episodes	2023	
My Husband Won't Fit	Drama	Fuji TV	Japan	Selected territories	1 season, 10 episodes	2019	
Scams	Crime drama	MBS	Japan	Selected territories	1 season, 9 episodes	2019	
The Many Faces of Ito	Drama	TBS	Japan	Selected territories	1 season, 8 episodes	2017	

=== Korean ===
Title	Genre	Original network	Original region	Netflix exclusive regions	Seasons	Original run	Notes
100 Days of Deception	Historical political thriller	tvN	South Korea	All other markets	16 episodes	2026	Miniseries ongoing
A Korean Odyssey	Fantasy drama	tvN	South Korea	All other markets	20 episodes	2017–18	
A Love So Beautiful	Coming-of-age romantic comedy	KakaoTV	South Korea	Selected territories	1 season, 24 episodes	2020–21	
A Virtuous Business	Comedy drama	JTBC	South Korea	Selected territories	1 season, 12 episodes	2024	
Abyss	Romantic fantasy	tvN	South Korea	All other markets	16 episodes	2019	
Agent Kim Reactivated	Revenge action	SBS TV	South Korea	Selected territories	10 episodes	2026	
Alchemy of Souls	Period drama	tvN	South Korea	Selected territories	2 parts, 30 episodes	2022–23	
Argon	Drama	tvN	South Korea	Selected territories	8 episodes	2017	
Arthdal Chronicles	Historical fantasy	tvN	South Korea	Selected territories	1 season, 18 episodes	2019	
Bad Guys: Vile City	Police procedural	OCN	South Korea	Selected territories	1 season, 16 episodes	2017–18	
Behind Every Star	Romantic comedy drama	tvN	South Korea	Selected territories	12 episodes	2022	
Behind Your Touch	Romantic comedy thriller	JTBC	South Korea	Selected territories	16 episodes	2023	
Beyond the Bar	Workplace legal drama	JTBC	South Korea	Selected territories	12 episodes	2025	
Black	Fantasy thriller	OCN	South Korea	Selected territories	18 episodes	2017	
Bon Appétit, Your Majesty	Fantasy historical drama	tvN	South Korea	All other markets	12 episodes	2025	
Bulgasal: Immortal Souls	Historical fantasy	tvN	South Korea	Selected territories	16 episodes	2021–22	
Business Proposal	Romantic comedy	SBS TV	South Korea	Selected territories	12 episodes	2022	
Café Minamdang	Mystery comedy drama	KBS2	South Korea	Selected territories	8 episodes	2022	
Captivating the King	Period drama melodrama	tvN	South Korea	Selected territories	16 episodes	2024	
Castaway Diva	Musical/Romantic thriller	tvN	South Korea	Selected territories	16 episodes	2023	
Check-in Hanyang	Period romantic drama	Channel A	South Korea	All other markets	16 episodes	2024–25	
Chief of Staff	Political drama	JTBC	South Korea	Selected territories	2 seasons, 20 episodes	2019	
Chocolate	Melodrama	JTBC	South Korea	Selected territories	16 episodes	2019–20	
Crash Course in Romance	Romantic comedy	tvN	South Korea	Selected territories	16 episodes	2023	
Crash Landing on You	Romantic comedy	tvN	South Korea	All other markets	16 episodes	2019–20	
Dare to Love Me	Romantic comedy	KBS2	South Korea	Selected territories	16 episodes	2024	
Designated Survivor: 60 Days	Political thriller	tvN	South Korea	All other markets	16 episodes	2019	
Destined with You	Romantic fantasy drama	JTBC	South Korea	Selected territories	16 episodes	2023	
Divorce Attorney Shin	Legal drama	JTBC	South Korea	Selected territories	12 episodes	2023	
Do Do Sol Sol La La Sol	Romantic comedy drama	KBS2	South Korea	Selected territories	16 episodes	2020	
Doctor Cha	Medical comedy drama	JTBC	South Korea	Selected territories	16 episodes	2023	
Doctor Slump	Medical comedy drama	JTBC	South Korea	Selected territories	16 episodes	2024	
Doctor X: Mafia in White	Medical drama	SBS TV	South Korea	Selected territories	12 episodes	2026	
Doubt	Crime drama	MBC TV	South Korea	All other markets	10 episodes	2024	
Dynamite Kiss	Romantic comedy	SBS TV	South Korea	Selected territories	14 episodes	2025	
Extraordinary Attorney Woo	Slice of life legal drama	ENA	South Korea	Selected territories	16 episodes	2022	
Forecasting Love and Weather	Romantic comedy	JTBC	South Korea	Selected territories	16 episodes	2022	
Four Hands, Two Sonatas	Romance drama	tvN	South Korea	Selected territories	12 episodes	2026	
Frankly Speaking	Comedy melodrama	JTBC	South Korea	Selected territories	12 episodes	2024	
Gift	Sports fantasy	tvN	South Korea	Selected territories	TBA	2026–27	Due to premiere on December 5, 2026
Green Mothers' Club	Family drama	JTBC	South Korea	Selected territories	16 episodes	2022	
Heavenly Ever After	Fantasy romance	JTBC	South Korea	Selected territories	12 episodes	2025	
Hello, Me!	Romantic fantasy comedy	KBS2	South Korea	Selected territories	16 episodes	2021	
Hi Bye, Mama!	Romantic fantasy comedy	tvN	South Korea	Selected territories	16 episodes	2020	
Hometown Cha-Cha-Cha	Romantic comedy	tvN	South Korea	Selected territories	16 episodes	2021	
Hospital Playlist	Medical romantic comedy	tvN	South Korea	Selected territories	2 seasons, 24 episodes	2020–21	
Hyena	Legal drama	SBS TV	South Korea	Selected territories	16 episodes	2020	
Inspector Koo	Police procedural	JTBC	South Korea	Selected territories	12 episodes	2021	
It's Okay to Not Be Okay	Romantic comedy	tvN	South Korea	All other markets	16 episodes	2020	
Itaewon Class	Coming-of-age drama	JTBC	South Korea	Selected territories	16 episodes	2020	
King the Land	Romantic comedy	JTBC	South Korea	Selected territories	16 episodes	2023	
Law School	Legal drama	JTBC	South Korea	Selected territories	16 episodes	2021	
Life	Medical drama	JTBC	South Korea	Selected territories	16 episodes	2018	
Like Flowers in Sand	Romantic sports drama	ENA	South Korea	Selected territories	12 episodes	2023–24	
Little Women	Mystery family drama	tvN	South Korea	Selected territories	12 episodes	2022	
Live	Police procedural	tvN	South Korea	Selected territories	18 episodes	2018	
Love (ft. Marriage and Divorce)	Romantic drama	TV Chosun	South Korea	Selected territories	3 seasons, 48 episodes	2021–22	
Love Next Door	Romantic comedy	tvN	South Korea	Selected territories	16 episodes	2024	
Love Scout	Romantic comedy drama	SBS TV	South Korea	All other markets	12 episodes	2025	
Lovestruck in the City	Romantic comedy	KakaoTV	South Korea	Selected territories	1 season, 17 episodes	2020–21	
Mad for Each Other	Romantic drama	KakaoTV	South Korea	Selected territories	1 season, 13 episodes	2021	
Man to Man	Action drama	JTBC	South Korea	All other markets	16 episodes	2017	
Memories of the Alhambra	Science fiction romantic thriller	tvN	South Korea	All other markets	16 episodes	2018–19	
Mine	Melodrama	tvN	South Korea	Selected territories	16 episodes	2021	
Miss Night and Day	Romantic comedy	JTBC	South Korea	Selected territories	16 episodes	2024	
Mr. Sunshine	Period drama	tvN	South Korea	All other markets	24 episodes	2018	
My Country: The New Age	Period drama	JTBC	South Korea	All other markets except China and Japan	32 episodes	2019	
My Demon	Romantic comedy	SBS TV	South Korea	Selected territories	16 episodes	2023–24	
My Liberation Notes	Slice-of-life	JTBC	South Korea	Selected territories	16 episodes	2022	
My Royal Nemesis	Romantic comedy fantasy	SBS TV	South Korea	Selected territories	14 episodes	2026	
Mystic Pop-up Bar	Fantasy comedy	JTBC	South Korea	Selected territories	12 episodes	2020	
Navillera	Coming-of-age melodrama	tvN	South Korea	Selected territories	12 episodes	2021	
Nevertheless	Romantic drama	JTBC	South Korea	Selected territories	10 episodes	2021	
No Tail to Tell	Romantic fantasy comedy	SBS TV	South Korea	Selected territories	12 episodes	2026	
One More Time	Romantic drama	KBS2	South Korea	Selected territories	8 episodes	2016	
One Spring Night	Romantic drama	MBC TV	South Korea	All other markets	16 episodes	2019	
Once Upon a Small Town	Romantic drama	KakaoTV	South Korea	Selected territories	12 episodes	2022	
Our Beloved Summer	Romantic comedy	SBS TV	South Korea	All other markets	16 episodes	2021–22	
Our Blues	Melodrama	tvN	South Korea	All other markets	20 episodes	2022	
Phantom Lawyer	Fantasy legal drama	SBS TV	South Korea	All other markets	16 episodes	2026	
Possessed	Supernatural thriller	OCN	South Korea	Selected territories	16 episodes	2019	
Prison Playbook	Black comedy	tvN	South Korea	All other markets	16 episodes	2017–18	
Pro Bono	Legal drama	tvN	South Korea	Selected territories	12 episodes	2025	
Private Lives	Romantic crime drama	JTBC	South Korea	Selected territories	16 episodes	2020	
Queen of Tears	Melodrama	tvN	South Korea	Selected territories	16 episodes	2024	
Racket Boys	Sports comedy drama	SBS TV	South Korea	Selected territories	16 episodes	2021	
Record of Youth	Coming-of-age romantic drama	tvN	South Korea	All other markets	16 episodes	2020	
Reflection of You	Melodrama	JTBC	South Korea	Selected territories	16 episodes	2021	
Resident Playbook	Medical drama	tvN	South Korea	Selected territories	12 episodes	2025	
Romance in the House	Romantic comedy	JTBC	South Korea	Selected territories	12 episodes	2024	
Romance Is a Bonus Book	Romantic comedy	tvN	South Korea	Selected territories	16 episodes	2019	
Rookie Historian Goo Hae-ryung	Period drama	MBC TV	South Korea	All other markets	20 episodes	2019	
Rugal	Science fiction police procedural	OCN	South Korea	Selected territories	16 episodes	2020	
Run On	Sport romantic comedy drama	JTBC	South Korea	Selected territories	16 episodes	2020–21	
See You in My 19th Life	Romantic fantasy drama	tvN	South Korea	Selected territories	12 episodes	2023	
Sisyphus: The Myth	Science fiction mystery thriller	JTBC	South Korea	Selected territories	16 episodes	2021	
Sold Out on You	Romantic workplace comedy	SBS TV	South Korea	Selected territories	12 episodes	2026	
Something in the Rain	Romantic melodrama	JTBC	South Korea	Selected territories	16 episodes	2018	
Spooky in Love	Romantic comedy horror	tvN	South Korea	Selected territories	12 episodes	2026	
Still Shining	Coming-of-age romantic melodrama	JTBC	South Korea	Selected territories	10 episodes	2026	
Start-Up	Slice of life romantic comedy drama	tvN	South Korea	Selected territories	16 episodes	2020	
Stranger	Crime thriller	tvN	South Korea	Worldwide except South Korea and China	2 seasons, 32 episodes	2017–20	
Strong Girl Nam-soon	Comedy drama	JTBC	South Korea	Selected territories	16 episodes	2023	
Tastefully Yours	Romance drama	ENA	South Korea	Selected territories	10 episodes	2025	
The Apartment Job	Crime comedy	JTBC	South Korea	Selected territories	12 episodes	2026	
The Atypical Family	Romantic drama	JTBC	South Korea	Selected territories	12 episodes	2024	
The Good Bad Mother	Comedy drama	JTBC	South Korea	Selected territories	14 episodes	2023	
The Hymn of Death	Period drama	SBS TV	South Korea	All other markets	3 episodes	2018	
The Interest of Love	Melodrama	JTBC	South Korea	Selected territories	16 episodes	2022–23	
The King: Eternal Monarch	Romantic fantasy	SBS TV	South Korea	All other markets	16 episodes	2020	
The King's Affection	Historical romantic drama	KBS2	South Korea	Worldwide	20 episodes	2021	
The Lies Within	Political drama	OCN	South Korea	Selected territories	16 episodes	2019	
The Potato Lab	Romantic comedy	tvN	South Korea	Selected territories	12 episodes	2025	
The Sound of Your Heart	Sitcom	Naver TV; KBS2	South Korea	All other markets	1 season, 10 episodes	2016	
The Sound of Your Heart: Reboot	Sitcom	Naver TV; KBS2	South Korea	Selected territories	2 seasons, 20 episodes	2018	
The Uncanny Counter	Fantasy thriller	OCN (season 1); tvN (season 2)	South Korea	Selected territories	2 season, 28 episodes	2020–21	
Thirty-Nine	Coming-of-age romantic drama	JTBC	South Korea	Selected territories	12 episodes	2022	
Tomorrow	Fantasy action drama	MBC TV	South Korea	Selected territories	16 episodes	2022	
Trolley	Mystery melodrama	SBS TV	South Korea	Selected territories	16 episodes	2022–23	
Twenty-Five Twenty-One	Coming-of-age romantic drama	tvN	South Korea	Selected territories	16 episodes	2022	
Typhoon Family	Period drama	tvN	South Korea	Selected territories	16 episodes	2025	
Under the Queen's Umbrella	Historical drama	tvN	South Korea	Selected territories	16 episodes	2022	
Undercover Miss Hong	Workplace comedy	tvN	South Korea	Selected territories	16 episodes	2026	
Vagabond	Action spy thriller	SBS TV	South Korea	All other markets	16 episodes	2019	
Vincenzo	Black romantic comedy	tvN	South Korea	Selected territories	20 episodes	2021	
Was It Love?	Romantic drama	JTBC	South Korea	Selected territories	16 episodes	2020	
We Are All Trying Here	Black comedy slice-of-life melodrama	JTBC	South Korea	Selected territories	12 episodes	2026	
Welcome to Samdal-ri	Romantic comedy	JTBC	South Korea	Selected territories	16 episodes	2023–24	
Welcome to Wedding Hell	Romantic drama	KakaoTV	South Korea	Selected territories	12 episodes	2022	
When the Camellia Blooms	Romantic comedy thriller	KBS2	South Korea	All other markets	20 episodes	2019	
When the Phone Rings	Romantic mystery thriller	MBC TV	South Korea	Selected territories	12 episodes	2024	
When the Stars Gossip	Science fiction romantic comedy	tvN	South Korea	Selected territories	20 episodes	2025	
White Nights	Melodrama	MBC TV	South Korea	All other markets	20 episodes	2016–17	
You Are My Spring	Romantic drama	tvN	South Korea	Selected territories	16 episodes	2021	

=== Mandarin ===
Title	Genre	Original network	Original region	Netflix exclusive regions	Seasons	Original run	Notes
A Love So Beautiful	Teen drama	Tencent Video	China	Selected territories	1 season, 24 episodes	2017	
A Taiwanese Tale of Two Cities	Slice of life melodrama	PTS; Formosa TV; myVideo	Taiwan	All other markets except the US	1 season, 12 episodes	2018	
A Thousand Goodnights	Slice of life melodrama	SET Metro	Taiwan	Selected territories	1 season, 10 episodes	2019	
Accidentally in Love	Romantic comedy	Tencent Video; Mango TV	China	Selected territories	1 season, 30 episodes	2018	
Ashes of Love	Romantic fantasy	Jiangsu TV	China	Selected territories	1 season, 63 episodes	2018	
Chosen	Thriller	iQIYI	China; Taiwan	Worldwide except China and Taiwan	1 season, 3 episodes	2018	
Green Door	Fantasy drama	PTS	Taiwan	Selected territories	1 season, 6 episodes	2019	
Handsome Siblings	Martial arts	CCTV-8; iQIYI	China	Selected territories	1 season, 44 episodes	2020	
I Hear You	Romantic drama	Youku	China	Selected territories	1 season, 24 episodes	2019	
Meteor Garden	Romantic comedy	Hunan TV	China	Worldwide except Thailand, Philippines and Indonesia	1 season, 49 episodes	2018	
No Regrets in Life	Romantic drama	EBC; GTV	Taiwan	Selected territories	1 season, 12 episodes	2022	
On Children	Science fiction anthology	PTS	Taiwan	Selected territories	1 season, 5 episodes	2018	
Perfect Match	Romantic period drama	Hunan TV	China	Selected territories	36 episodes	2025	
Take My Brother Away	Teen comedy drama	Tencent Video	China	Selected territories	1 season, 30 episodes	2018	
The Devil Punisher	Romantic fantasy	TTV; SET Metro	Taiwan	Selected territories	1 season, 20 episodes	2020–21	
The Prince of Tennis ~ Match! Tennis Juniors ~	Teen drama	Tencent Video	China	Selected territories	1 season, 40 episodes	2019	
The Rational Life	Romantic drama	Mango TV	China	Selected territories	1 season, 35 episodes	2021	
The Rise of Phoenixes	Period drama	Hunan TV; iQIYI	China	All other markets	1 season, 70 episodes	2018	
Til Death Do Us Part	Science fiction thriller anthology	iQIYI; PTS	Taiwan	Selected territories	1 season, 7 episodes	2019	
Unrequited Love	Romantic drama	Tencent Video; Mango TV	China	Selected territories	1 season, 24 episodes	2021	
Well-Intended Love	Romantic comedy	Sohu	China	Selected territories	2 seasons, 36 episodes	2019–20	
Yanxi Palace: Princess Adventures	Period drama	Bilibili	China	Selected territories	1 season, 6 episodes	2019	

=== Norwegian ===
Title	Genre	Original network	Original region	Netflix exclusive regions	Seasons	Original run	Notes
Borderliner	Police procedural	TV 2	Norway	All other markets	1 season, 8 episodes	2017	
Gangs of Oslo	Crime drama	TV 2	Norway	All other markets	1 season, 6 episodes	2023	
Nobel	War drama thriller	NRK	Norway	Selected territories	1 season, 8 episodes	2016	
Norsemen	Period comedy drama	NRK1	Norway	All other markets	3 seasons, 18 episodes	2016–20	

=== Portuguese ===
Title	Genre	Original network	Original region	Netflix exclusive regions	Seasons	Original run	Notes
Blood Pact	Crime drama	Space Brazil	Brazil	Selected territories	1 season, 8 episodes	2018	
Borges Importadora	Sitcom	Comedy Central Brazil	Brazil	Selected territories	1 season, 10 episodes	2018	
Until Life Do Us Apart	Drama	RTP	Portugal	Selected territories	1 season, 8 episodes	2021	

=== Spanish ===
Title	Genre	Original network	Original region	Netflix exclusive regions	Seasons	Original run	Notes
45 rpm	Music drama	Antena 3	Spain	Selected territories	1 season, 13 episodes	2019	
Alba	Drama	Atresplayer Premium	Spain	Selected territories	1 season, 13 episodes	2021	
All For Love	Telenovela	Caracol Televisión	Colombia	Selected territories	1 season, 69 episodes	2020	
Ángela	Drama	Atresplayer Premium	Spain	Selected territories	6 episodes	2024	
Apache: The Life of Carlos Tevez	Biographical drama	Telefe	Argentina	Selected territories	1 season, 8 episodes	2019	
Bolívar	Period drama	Caracol Televisión	Colombia	Selected territories	1 season, 60 episodes	2019	
Cathedral of the Sea	Historical drama	Antena 3	Spain	All other markets	1 season, 8 episodes	2017	
Cocaine Coast	Biographical crime drama	Antena 3	Spain	Selected territories	1 season, 10 episodes	2018	
Death Inc. (seasons 1–2)	Comedy	Movistar Plus+	Spain	Selected territories	2 seasons, 14 episodes	2024–25	
Defying Destiny	Telenovela	Caracol Televisión	Colombia	Selected territories	1 season, 64 episodes	2026	
Diary of a Gigolo	Thriller	Telemundo	United States	Selected territories	1 season, 10 episodes	2022	
El Dragón	Crime telenovela	Univision	United States	Selected territories	2 seasons, 82 episodes	2019–20	
El Marginal (seasons 1–3)	Crime drama	TV Pública	Argentina	Selected territories	3 seasons, 29 episodes	2016–19	
El Rey, Vicente Fernández	Biopic	Caracol Televisión	Colombia	All other markets	1 season, 36 episodes	2022	
El Vato	Biographical comedy drama	NBC Universo	United States	All other markets	2 seasons, 23 episodes	2016–17	
Forbidden Woman	Telenovela	Caracol Televisión	Colombia	Selected territories	1 season, 61 episodes	2026	
Four Seasons in Havana	Crime drama	RTVE	Spain	Selected territories	1 season, 4 episodes	2016	
Fugitiva	Thriller	La 1 TVE	Spain	All other markets	1 season, 10 episodes	2018	
Her Mother's Killer	Crime telenovela	Caracol Televisión	Colombia	Selected territories	2 seasons, 123 episodes	2020−25	
Historia de un clan	Biographical crime drama	Telefe	Argentina	US, Canada, UK, Ireland and Portugal	1 season, 11 episodes	2015	
Klass 95: The Power of Beauty	Telenovela	Caracol Televisión	Colombia	Selected territories	1 season, 45 episodes	2024	
La Reina del Sur	Telenovela	Telemundo	United States	Selected territories	3 seasons, 183 episodes	2011–23	
Lies and Deceit	Drama	Atresplayer Premium	Spain	Selected territories	1 season, 6 episodes	2020	
Locked Up	Crime drama	Antena 3	Spain	Selected territories	5 seasons, 48 episodes	2015–20	
Love of My Life	Telenovela	Caracol Televisión	Colombia	Selected territories	1 season, 60 episodes	2024	
Luis Miguel: The Series	Biographical drama	Telemundo	United States	Latin America, Spain and Japan	3 seasons, 27 episodes	2018–21	
Mariachi's Daughter	Telenovela	Canal RCN	Colombia	Selected territories	1 season, 100 episodes	2025	
Millennials	Romantic comedy	Net TV	Argentina	Latin America	1 season, 24 episodes	2018–19	
Miss Adrenaline: A Tale of Twins	Telenovela	Caracol Televisión	Colombia	Selected territories	1 season, 65 episodes	2023	
Money Heist (parts 1–2)	Heist crime drama	Antena 3	Spain	Selected territories	1 season, 15 episodes	2017	
Monzón: A Knockout Blow	Drama	Telefe	Argentina	Selected territories	1 season, 13 episodes	2019	
Morocco: Love in Times of War	Historical drama	Antena 3	Spain	Selected territories	1 season, 13 episodes	2017	
Newly Rich, Newly Poor	Telenovela	Caracol Televisión	Colombia	Selected territories	1 season, 62 episodes	2025	
Nicky Jam: El Ganador	Biographical drama	Telemundo	United States	All other markets	1 season, 13 episodes	2017	
Stolen Away	Thriller	Antena 3	Spain	Selected territories	1 season, 11 episodes	2020	
Playing with Fire	Romantic drama	Telemundo	United States	Selected territories	1 season, 10 episodes	2019	
Rojo carmesí	Telenovela	Canal RCN	Colombia	Selected territories	1 season, 81 episodes	2024	
Surviving Escobar: Alias JJ	Biographical crime telenovela	Caracol Televisión	Colombia	Selected territories	1 season, 60 episodes	2017	
The Barrier	Dystopian drama	Antena 3	Spain	Selected territories	1 season, 13 episodes	2020	
The Cook of Castamar	Period drama	Atresplayer Premium	Spain	Selected territories	1 season, 12 episodes	2021	
The Department of Time	Science fiction drama	La 1 TVE	Spain	Selected territories	3 seasons, 34 episodes	2015–17	
The Girl	Telenovela	Caracol Televisión	Colombia	Selected territories	1 season, 86 episodes	2016	
The Good Bandit	Comedy telenovela	Caracol Televisión	Colombia	Selected territories	1 season, 63 episodes	2019	
The Influencer	Comedy drama	Caracol Televisión	Colombia	Selected territories	1 season, 60 episodes	2023−24	
The Inmate	Crime thriller	Telemundo	United States	Selected territories	1 season, 13 episodes	2018	
The Mafia Dolls (season 2)	Crime drama	Caracol Televisión	Colombia	Selected territories	1 season, 60 episodes	2019	
The Queen and the Conqueror	Period telenovela	Caracol Televisión	Colombia	Selected territories	1 season, 60 episodes	2020	
The Queen of Flow	Telenovela	Caracol Televisión	Colombia	Worldwide except Colombia, Ecuador, Venezuela and Japan	3 seasons, 235 episodes	2018–26	
The Road to Love	Comedy telenovela	Caracol Televisión	Colombia	Selected territories	1 season, 63 episodes	2019	
The Scent of Passion	Telenovela	Canal RCN	Colombia	Selected territories	1 season, 92 episodes	2021	
The Snitch Cartel: Origins	Crime drama	Caracol Televisión	Colombia	Selected territories	1 season, 60 episodes	2021	
The Unbroken Voice	Music drama	Caracol Televisión	Colombia	Selected territories	2 seasons, 125 episodes	2022–24	
Til Money Do Us Part	Telenovela	Canal RCN	Colombia	Selected territories	1 season, 88 episodes	2022	
Toy Boy	Crime thriller	Antena 3	Spain	Selected territories	2 seasons, 21 episodes	2019–21	
Unauthorized Living	Drama	Telecinco	Spain	Selected territories	2 seasons, 23 episodes	2018–20	
Undercover Law	Police procedural telenovela	Caracol Televisión	Colombia	Selected territories	1 season, 60 episodes	2018	
Until You Burn	Drama	Caracol Televisión	Colombia	Selected territories	1 season, 60 episodes	2024−25	
Victim Number 8	Conspiracy thriller	ETB 2	Spain	Selected territories	1 season, 8 episodes	2019	
Wrong Side of the Tracks	Drama	Telecinco	Spain	Selected territories	4 seasons, 32 episodes	2022–24	
You Cannot Hide	Thriller	Telemundo	United States	Selected territories	1 season, 10 episodes	2019	

=== Thai ===
Title	Genre	Original network	Original region	Netflix exclusive regions	Seasons	Original run	Notes
Answer for Heaven	Fantasy comedy drama	One 31	Thailand	Selected territories	1 season, 18 episodes	2019	
Bangkok Love Stories: Hey You!	Romantic drama anthology	GMM 25	Thailand	Selected territories	13 episodes	2018	
Bangkok Love Stories: Innocence	Romantic drama anthology	GMM 25	Thailand	Selected territories	13 episodes	2018	
Bangkok Love Stories: Objects of Affection	Romantic drama anthology	GMM 25	Thailand	Selected territories	13 episodes	2019	
Bangkok Love Stories: Plead	Romantic drama anthology	GMM 25	Thailand	Selected territories	13 episodes	2019	
Monkey Twins	Action crime drama	GMM One	Thailand	Selected territories	1 season, 13 episodes	2018	
Oh My Ghost	Romantic fantasy comedy drama	True4U	Thailand	Selected territories	1 season, 16 episodes	2018	
The Judgement	Teen crime drama	GMM 25	Thailand	All other markets	1 season, 13 episodes	2018	

=== Turkish ===
Title	Genre	Original network	Original region	Netflix exclusive regions	Seasons	Original run	Notes
Immortals	Drama	BluTV	Turkey	Selected territories	1 season, 8 episodes	2018	
The Yard	Drama	puhutv	Turkey	Selected territories	2 seasons, 44 episodes	2018–19	
Wolf	Drama	Star TV	Turkey	Selected territories	1 season, 6 episodes	2018	

=== Other ===
Title	Genre	Original network	Original region	Netflix exclusive regions	Seasons	Language	Original run	Notes
Amo	Crime drama	TV5	Philippines	All other markets	1 season, 13 episodes	Filipino	2018	
Better than Us	Science fiction drama	Channel One	Russia	All other markets	1 season, 16 episodes	Russian	2018	
Bitter Daisies	Police procedural	TVG; CTV	Spain	Selected territories	2 seasons, 12 episodes	Galician	2018–21	
Bonus Family	Comedy drama	SVT	Sweden	All other markets except Denmark, Finland, and Norway	4 seasons, 38 episodes	Swedish	2017–21	
Bordertown	Crime drama	Yle TV1	Finland	Selected territories	3 seasons, 31 episodes	Finnish	2016–20	
Caliphate	Drama	SVT	Sweden	Selected territories	1 season, 8 episodes	Swedish	2020	
Capitani	Crime drama	RTL	Luxembourg	Selected territories	2 seasons, 24 episodes	Luxembourgish	2019–22	
Case	Crime drama	Stöð 2	Iceland	Selected territories	1 season, 9 episodes	Icelandic	2015	
Deadwind	Crime drama	Yle TV2	Finland	Selected territories	3 seasons, 28 episodes	Finnish	2018–21	
Justice	Drama	OSN Ya Hala Al Oula	United Arab Emirates	Selected territories	1 season, 18 episodes	Arabic	2017	
Maestro in Blue	Crime drama	Mega Channel	Greece	Selected territories	3 seasons, 19 episodes	Greek	2022–26	Season 4 due to premiere on December 18, 2026
Signs	Crime drama	AXN	Poland	Selected territories	2 seasons, 16 episodes	Polish	2018–20	
To the Lake	Science fiction drama	Premier	Russia	Selected territories	1 season, 8 episodes	Russian	2019	
Ultraviolet	Crime drama	AXN	Poland	Selected territories	2 seasons, 22 episodes	Polish	2017–19	
Undercover	Crime drama	BNT 1	Bulgaria	France	4 seasons, 48 episodes	Bulgarian	2011–16	

== Unscripted ==
=== Docuseries ===
Title	Subject	Original network	Original region	Netflix exclusive regions	Seasons	Language	Original run	Notes
Age of Samurai: Battle for Japan	History	Smithsonian Channel	Canada	All other markets	6 episodes	English	2021	
Ask the Doctor	Health	ABC	Australia	Selected territories	1 season, 12 episodes	English	2017	
Depp v Heard	True crime/Film industry	Channel 4	United Kingdom	Selected territories	3 episodes	English	2023	
Flavorful Origins	Food	Tencent	China	Selected territories	3 seasons, 40 episodes	Mandarin	2019–20	
Greatest Events of WWII in Colour	History	Discovery; n-tv; Planète+	United Kingdom; Germany; France	Selected territories	1 season, 10 episodes	English	2019	
High: Confessions of an Ibiza Drug Mule	True crime	BBC Three	United Kingdom	Selected territories	4 episodes	English	2021	
Hip-Hop Evolution (season 1)	Music/History	HBO Canada	Canada	All other markets	1 season, 4 episodes	English	2016	
Human: The World Within	Human development	PBS	United States	Selected territories	6 episodes	English	2021	
Inside the Criminal Mind	Psychology	ZDF	Germany	Selected territories	1 season, 4 episodes	English	2017	
Juana Inés	Biography	Canal Once	Mexico	All other markets	1 season, 7 episodes	Spanish	2017	
Leaving Neverland	Biography	Channel 4; HBO	United Kingdom/United States	Selected territories	2 episodes	English	2019	
Magical Andes	Nature	Arte	Germany	Selected territories	2 seasons, 10 episodes	Spanish	2019–21	
Nisman: The Prosecutor, the President, and the Spy	Biography/True crime	3Cat; ZDFinfo	Catalonia; Germany	Selected territories	1 season, 6 episodes	Spanish	2020	
Paul Hollywood's Big Continental Road Trip	Travel	BBC Two	United Kingdom	All other markets except Ireland, Poland and Africa	1 season, 3 episodes	English	2017	
Secret World of Sound with David Attenborough	Nature	Sky Nature	United Kingdom	Selected territories	1 season, 3 episodes	English	2024	
Tales by Light	Nature	National Geographic Channel	Australia	All other markets except New Zealand, Spain, Portugal and Africa	2 seasons, 12 episodes	English	2015–18	
The Cuba Libre Story	History/Biography	ZDF	Germany	Selected territories	8 episodes	English	2016	
The Defiant Ones	Music industry	HBO	United States	All other markets except Canada	1 season, 4 episodes	English	2017	
The Investigator: A British Crime Story	True crime	ITV	United Kingdom	All other markets except Ireland, Australia and New Zealand	1 season, 4 episodes	English	2016	
The World's Most Extraordinary Homes	Interior design	BBC Two	United Kingdom	All other markets except Ireland	3 seasons, 12 episodes	English	2017–18	
This Is Pop	Music	CTV	Canada	Selected territories	1 season, 8 episodes	English	2021	
Time: The Kalief Browder Story	True crime/Biography	Spike	United States	All other markets	1 season, 6 episodes	English	2017	
Top Secret UFO Projects: Declassified	Speculative	Sky History	United Kingdom	Selected territories	1 season, 6 episodes	English	2021	
Trump: An American Dream	Biography/Politics	Channel 4	United Kingdom	All other markets except Ireland	4 episodes	English	2017	
Who Killed Malcolm X?	True crime/Biography	Fusion TV	United States	Selected territories	6 episodes	English	2020	
WWII in Color: Road to Victory	History	Channel 5	United Kingdom	Selected territories	1 season 10 episodes	English	2008–09	(Note: The show was originally 13 episodes long, but was recut to 10 episodes.)

=== Reality ===
Title	Genre	Original network	Original region	Netflix exclusive regions	Seasons	Language	Original run	Notes
America's Got Talent: The Champions	Talent show	NBC	United States	UK and Ireland	1 season, 7 episodes	English	2019	
American Idol (season 17)	Talent show	ABC	United States	UK and Ireland	1 season, 7 episodes	English	2019	
Baby Ballroom	Coming of age ballroom dance	Channel 5	United Kingdom	Selected territories	2 seasons, 15 episodes	English	2017–18	
Back with the Ex	Dating show	Seven Network	Australia	Selected territories	1 season, 7 episodes	English	2018	
Big Timber	Timber competition	History	Canada	Selected territories	2 seasons, 18 episodes	English	2020–21	
Blown Away (season 1)	Glassblowing competition	Makeful	Canada	Selected territories	1 season, 10 episodes	English	2019	
Churchill's Secret Agents: The New Recruits	Historical survival competition	BBC Two	United Kingdom	All other markets except Ireland	1 season, 5 episodes	English	2018	
Down for Love	Dating show	TVNZ+	New Zealand	Selected territories	1 season, 5 episodes	English	2022	
Droppin' Cash: Los Angeles	Socialites	Complex	United States	Selected territories	2 seasons, 25 episodes	English	2018–19	
Glow Up	Make-up competition	BBC Three	United Kingdom	Selected territories	5 seasons, 40 episodes	English	2019–23	
Heavy Rescue: 401	Vehicle recovery	Discovery Channel Canada	Canada	All other markets	2 seasons, 19 episodes	English	2016–18	
Instant Hotel	Hotel renovation competition	Seven Network	Australia	Selected territories	2 seasons, 18 episodes	English	2017–19	
Interior Design Masters	Interior design competition	BBC Two	United Kingdom	Selected territories	1 season, 8 episodes	English	2019	
Love on the Spectrum: Australia	Dating show	ABC TV	Australia	Selected territories	2 seasons, 11 episodes	English	2019–21	
Million Pound Menu	Restaurant investment	BBC Two	United Kingdom	Selected territories	2 seasons, 12 episodes	English	2018–19	
Nadiya Bakes	Cooking show	BBC Two	United Kingdom	Selected Territories	1 season, 8 episodes	English	2020	
Nadiya's Time to Eat	Cooking show	BBC Two	United Kingdom	Selected Territories	1 season, 7 episodes	English	2019	
Restaurants on the Edge	Restaurant renovation	Cottage Life	Canada	Selected territories	2 seasons, 13 episodes	English	2020	
Rupaul's Drag Race (seasons 9–13)	Drag queen competition	VH1	United States	Selected territories	5 seasons, 72 episodes	English	2017–21	
RuPaul's Drag Race All Stars (seasons 4–5)	Drag queen competition	VH1	United States	UK, Ireland and Japan	2 seasons, 18 episodes	English	2018–20	
RuPaul's Drag Race: Untucked (seasons 9–13)	Drag queen competition	VH1	United States	Selected territories	5 seasons, 62 episodes	English	2018–21	
RuPaul's Secret Celebrity Drag Race	Drag queen competition	VH1	United States	UK, Ireland and Japan	1 season, 4 episodes	English	2020	
Rust Valley Restorers	Car restoration	History	Canada	Selected territories	3 seasons, 20 episodes	English	2018–20	
The Apprentice: ONE Championship Edition	Leadership competition	Various	Asia	Selected territories	1 season, 13 episodes	English	2021	
The Big Family Cooking Showdown	Family cooking competition	BBC One	United Kingdom	All other markets except Ireland	2 seasons, 26 episodes	English	2017–18	
The Casketeers	Funeral docu-reality	TVNZ	New Zealand	Selected territories	2 seasons, 14 episodes	English	2018–19	
The Great British Baking Show (series 4–17)	Baking competition	BBC One (series 4); BBC Two (series 5–7); Channel 4 (series 8–present)	United Kingdom	Selected territories	14 collections, 140 episodes	English	2013–26	
The Great British Baking Show: The Beginnings	Baking competition	BBC One	United Kingdom	Selected territories	1 season, 8 episodes	English	2012	(Note: Originally released as series 3 of The Great British Bake Off on BBC One.)
The Great British Baking Show: Holidays	Christmas baking competition	Channel 4	United Kingdom	Selected territories	8 seasons, 16 episodes	English	2017–25	Season 9 due to premiere on November 23, 2026
The Great British Baking Show: Juniors (seasons 6–7)	Baking competition	CBBC (season 1–4); Channel 4 (season 5–present)	United Kingdom	Selected territories	2 seasons, 30 episodes	English	2021–22	
The Great British Baking Show: The Professionals (seasons 6–7)	Baking competition	Channel 4	United Kingdom	Selected territories	2 seasons, 20 episodes	English	2021–22	
The Parisian Agency: Exclusive Properties (season 1)	Property management	TMC	France	Selected territories	1 season, 5 episodes	French	2020	
Tiny House Nation (season 5)	Tiny house	A&E	United States	Selected territories	2 volumes, 14 episodes	English	2019	
Wild Croc Territory	Crocodile hunting	9Now	Australia	Selected territories	1 season, 10 episodes	English	2022	
Win the Wilderness	Survival competition	BBC Two	United Kingdom	Selected territories	1 season, 6 episodes	English	2020	
Yummy Mummies	Motherhood	Seven Network	Australia	Selected territories	2 seasons, 20 episodes	English	2017–18	

=== Variety ===
Title	Genre	Original network	Original region	Netflix exclusive regions	Seasons	Language	Original run	Notes
After Trek	Talk show	CBS All Access	United States	All other markets except United States and Canada	1 season, 14 episodes	2017–18	English	
J-Style Trip (season 2)	Variety show	ZJTV	China	Selected territories	1 season, 14 episodes	2023–24	Mandarin	

== Specials ==
Title	Genre	Original network	Original region	Netflix exclusive regions	Original run	Notes
Beat Bugs: All Together Now	Animation	7TWO	Australia	All other markets	2017	
Chip and Potato: Chip's Holiday	Children's television series	Family Jr.	Canada	Selected territories	2022	
Rabbids Invasion: Mission to Mars	Animation	France 3	France	Selected territories	2021	
Shaun the Sheep: The Flight Before Christmas	Stop motion	BBC One	United Kingdom	Selected territories	2021	
