= Qinghai cuisine =

Regional cooking style of the Han Chinese

- Chinese: 青海菜
Transcriptions
Standard Mandarin
- Hanyu Pinyin: Qīnghǎi cài

Qinghai cuisine is the regional cooking style of the Han Chinese with distinct influence from the Hui, Monguor people, and Tibetans in the Qinghai province in Northwest China.

== Characteristic features ==
Qinghai is populated by Han Chinese, Hui, Monguor people, and Tibetans developing the regional cuisine to reflect a regional melting pot.

The high altitude and rugged terrain in Qinghai limits the crops that can grow in the region though barley and yaks grow well in the region because of their tolerance to colder climates. Meals are hearty and often use yak products such as their meat and butter. The main sources of meat are beef and mutton.

Sour and spicy, sweet and aromatic, crisp and bitter are the primary flavors of the region.

Historically, the Qinghai and Tibetan regions have shared economic and cultural exchanging making the local cuisines very similar.

Qinghai cuisine shares similarities with neighboring provinces Xinjiang, Tibet, and Gansu.

== Notable dishes ==
Name	Chinese	Pinyin	Picture	Notes
Hui-style Dumplings	回式饺子	huí shì jiǎozi		Filled with carrot, potato, and meat seasoned with Silk Road spices.
Grabbing Mutton	手抓羊肉	shǒu zhuā yángròu		See Gansu cuisine notable dishes
Blood Sausage	血肠	xuè cháng		Mongolic influence.
Flag Flower Noodles	旗花汤面	qí huā tāngmiàn		Noodles are rolled thin and then cut into tiny, diamond shaped pieces. Broth flavored with tomatoes, squash, carrot, radish, spinach, mutton.

== See also ==
- Chinese cuisine
- Gansu cuisine
- Xinjiang cuisine
- Tibetan cuisine
