= UHB =

UHB may refer to:

- Hokkaido Cultural Broadcasting, Japan
- Diving medicine or undersea and hyperbaric medicine
- UHB Facilities Ltd, of University Hospitals Birmingham NHS Foundation Trust
- University Hospital of Brooklyn, SUNY Downstate Medical Center
- Ultra-high bypass turbofan or propfan, a type of jet engine
- Unhexbium, the 162nd element of extended periodic table
- UHB 1,2,3,4,5 (albums), several albums of Living Legends (group)
