= Gansu cuisine =

Regional cooking style of the Han Chinese

- Traditional Chinese: 甘肅菜
- Simplified Chinese: 甘肃菜
Transcriptions
Standard Mandarin
- Hanyu Pinyin: Gānsù cài

Gansu cuisine, also known as Long cuisine (陇菜), is the regional cooking style of the Han Chinese deeply influenced by the local Hui people in the Gansu province of Northwestern China.

== Characteristic features ==
Gansu was the historical destination along the Silk Road that marked the entrance into China through the Hexi Corridor. All migration into China by the Northern Silk Road including economic and military passed through Gansu, leading to the formation of Arabic, Islamic, and Chinese cultural characteristics within the region.

Islam has historically dominated the region, lending the strong practice of halal among local Hui and Han populations. Gansu cuisine is unique for the signature Hui influence that is found only in Northwest China. The halal preference has shaped the cuisine to revolve around roasting, steaming, and braising of primarily beef and mutton/lamb but seldom pork (in accordance with halal doctrine) or chicken despite the two animals being most common in other Chinese cuisines.

The climate for Northwestern China is generally too arid and cold to grow rice, making wheat, barley, millet, beans, and sweet potatoes the main sources of starch. Gansu is famed throughout China for their regional variation of hand-pulled noodles locally referred to as "dragon whiskers", which are skillfully stretched until the noodles are nearly needle-like in thinness, hence their name. Other famed starchy dishes are steamed buns, dumplings, and pancakes.

The regional terrain ranges from desert, mountain, and plains, making local dishes hearty and fulfilling by usually being very fatty and oily.

Salty, sour, and spicy are the prevailing flavors in dishes.

Gansu cuisine is also influenced by the strongly Islamic provinces of Xinjiang and Ningxia as well as the Sichuan province.

== Notable dishes ==
Name	Chinese	Pinyin	Picture	Notes
Lanzhou Beef Noodles	兰州牛肉面,	lanzhou niúròu miàn, niúròu lāmiàn		Also known as "Lanzhou lamian" is a beef soup with hand-pulled noodles originating from Lanzhou that can be found across China.
Grabbing Mutton	手抓羊肉	shǒu zhuā yángròu		Comes from how people would grab the mutton from street vendors to eat on the go.
Stir-Fried Hump with Five Shredded Toppings	驼峰炒五丝	tuófēng chǎo wǔ sī		The fatty meat of the camel's hump is diced then stir-fried along with shredded leek, bamboo shoots, mushrooms, ham, and chicken breast. The rarity of the dish made it a luxury.
Snowy Mountain Camel Hoof	雪山驼掌	xuěshān tuó zhǎng		Actually made from the tendon. Steamed with whole chickens for 7/8 hours until tender. Sliced and molded back into the shape of a hoof topped with cooked egg white.
Jingyuan Yellow Braised Lamb Meat	靖远黄焖羊肉	jìng yuǎn huáng mèn yángròu		A Geographically Protected Product in China. Cooked in a variety of methods from frying to braising in 10 Chinese medicinal herbs. Signature to the Jingyuan people.

== See also ==
- Chinese cuisine
- Flavorful Origins - television documentary series examining cuisines of Chaoshan, Yunnan, and Gansu
- Sichuan cuisine
- Xinjiang cuisine
