= Amo (TV series) =

Philippine drama television series

- Genre: Crime drama
- Written by: Troy Espiritu
- Directed by: Brillante Mendoza
- Starring: Derek Ramsay; Vince Rillon; Allen Dizon; Felix Roco
- Country of origin: Philippines
- Original language: Filipino
- No. of episodes: 13

Production
- Running time: 21–25 minutes
- Production company: TV5

Original release
- Network: TV5
- Release: April 21 – July 14, 2018

Amo (transl. Boss; stylized as AMO) is a Philippine television drama crime series broadcast by TV5. Directed by Brillante Mendoza, it stars Derek Ramsay, Vince Rillon, Allen Dizon, and Felix Roco. It aired on the network's Saturday evening line up and worldwide on Kapatid TV5 from April 21 to July 14, 2018. There has been some controversy over its portrayal of the Philippine drug war.

It was made available for streaming internationally on April 9, 2018, with Netflix having the exclusive global distribution rights, making it the first Netflix Original Series from the Philippines.

== Premise ==
Despite the Philippine government's crackdown on narcotics, high school student Joseph expands his drug running while his cop uncle profits from corruption.

Joseph, who looks to expand his participation in the drug operation, is not the only member of his family involved in illegal activity; his uncle Camilo, who is a cop, profits from corruption working as part of a gang. While leading a double life together with his brother-in-law Bino, Joseph has run-ins with the law and needs help from family members to get him out of it and cover his tracks.

== Cast ==
- Vince Rillon as Joseph Molina
- Derek Ramsay as Rodrigo Macaraeg
- Allen Dizon as Camilo Molina
- Rhea Jai Fernandez as Cristina/Pilar
- Felix Roco as Bino Campos
- Ruby Ruiz as Myrna Molina
- JC Tan as Edgar
- Aldrico Padilla as Tisoy
- Baron Geisler as Joben
- Elijah Filamor as Kupal
- RJ Gratuito as Kiko
- Adrianna So as Michelle
- Nikko Delos Santos as Chekwa
- Elijah Filamor as Kupal
- Fred Cortez as Kulot
- VJ Parreno as Rodel
- Jeff Sison as Kap. Banjo
- Natileigh Sitoy as Jillian Molina
- Dexter Macaraeg as Enteng Molina
- Mae Aniceto as Mare/ School Guard
- Ruffa Zuueta as Tranny
- Dante Wayan as Mang Celso
- Jayzelle Suan as Luningning
- Emma Resureccion as Salud
- Richard Lopez as Jay
- Yoshihiro Hara as Takeo
- Rusty M. Loayon as Rapper 1
- Russell M. Loayon as Rapper 2
- Roman Garcia as Rapper 3
- John Rey Espinueva as Gang Member 1
- Christine Florendo as Gang member 2
- Divina Mhelo as Gang member 3
- Jalyn Taboneknek as Gang member 4

== Episodes ==
As aired on The 5 Network

| No. | Title | Directed by | Written by | Original release date |
|---|---|---|---|---|
| 1 | "The Runner" | Brillante Mendoza | Troy Espiritu | April 21, 2018 |
After receiving a text message, high school student Joseph sneaks out of class to take care of some risky business in a local neighborhood.
| 2 | "The Officer" | Brillante Mendoza | Troy Espiritu | April 28, 2018 |
When Joseph's name appears on a suspects list kept by the police as part of a government crackdown on drug offenders, his Uncle Camilo takes action.
| 3 | "The Traitor" | Brillante Mendoza | Troy Espiritu | May 5, 2018 |
When Joseph spots a fellow gang member in suspicious company, he secretly follows him and witnesses a horrifying betrayal.
| 4 | "The Execution" | Brillante Mendoza | Troy Espiritu | May 12, 2018 |
In the middle of the night, Joseph sneaks out of his family's home to join his gang in seeking revenge against the traitor in their midst.
| 5 | "The Cheater" | Brillante Mendoza | Troy Espiritu | May 19, 2018 |
While visiting his sister in Manila, Joseph has another run-in with the law. His brother-in-law pulls some strings but makes his wife suspicious.
| 6 | "The Drug" | Brillante Mendoza | Troy Espiritu | May 26, 2018 |
As the extent of his double life unfolds, brother-in-law Bino introduces Joseph to the world of high-end party drugs.
| 7 | "The Party" | Brillante Mendoza | Troy Espiritu | June 2, 2018 |
Joseph enjoys his increased income, but the glamour of his new job is soon tarnished by a TV news report and an undercover operation.
| 8 | "The Operation" | Brillante Mendoza | Troy Espiritu | June 9, 2018 |
Bino tries to help Joseph and gang mate Tisoy cover their tracks. But the police are hot on their heels and determined to catch them, dead or alive.
| 9 | "The Asset" | Brillante Mendoza | Troy Espiritu | June 16, 2018 |
Police officer Rod joins colleague Camilo on a mission to capture a Japanese drug lord, using sex worker Christina as their undercover asset.
| 10 | "The Kidnap" | Brillante Mendoza | Troy Espiritu | June 23, 2018 |
With Christina's help, Rod and Camilo raid Takeo's home and make an arrest. But it soon becomes apparent that this is no ordinary police capture.
| 11 | "The Cover-up" | Brillante Mendoza | Troy Espiritu | June 30, 2018 |
When the press start asking questions about an alleged kidnapping of a Japanese national, Camilo and Rod are ordered to cover their tracks.
| 12 | "The Whistleblower" | Brillante Mendoza | Troy Espiritu | July 7, 2018 |
Rod gets greedy and insists on going after additional money they were promised, unaware Takeo's wife is working with a different police unit.
| 13 | "The Escape" | Brillante Mendoza | Troy Espiritu | July 14, 2018 |
Camilo goes into hiding and calls his boss, begging for help. Meanwhile, a witness comes forward and spills details of the kidnapping on a radio show.

== Production ==
Amo was directed by Brillante Mendoza and was produced under TV5 Network.

== Release ==
Amo was set to premiere on TV5 on August 25, 2017. However, it was pushed back due to other sporting events caused by the partnership between American cable sports television network ESPN and TV5 announced in October 2017 to form ESPN5 (now known as One Sports) . It was also one of the few television series invited for screening at the 2017 Cannes International Film Festival. TV5 and Netflix later entered into an agreement with the latter started distributing Amo online to a global audience on April 9, 2018, and was the only Filipino television show distributed by Netflix at the time.
