= Pokémon Ultimate Journeys: The Series =

Twenty-fifth season of the Pokémon TV series

- Season 25
- Pokémon Ultimate Journeys: The Series poster Pokémon: To Be a Pokémon Master poster
- No. of episodes: 57 + 5 specials (Japanese version); 54 + 4 specials (English version)

Release
- Original network: TV Tokyo
- Original release: December 17, 2021 – March 24, 2023

Season chronology
- ← Previous; Master Journeys Next → Horizons

Pokémon Ultimate Journeys: The Series is the twenty-fifth season of the Pokémon anime series and the third and final season of Pokémon Journeys: The Series, known in Japan as Pocket Monsters. (Note: In Japanese: ポケットモンスター, Poketto Monsutā) The season premiered in Japan on TV Tokyo from December 17, 2021, to March 24, 2023, and in the United States Netflix released new episodes on October 21, 2022, February 24, 2023, and June 23, 2023, and the final part titled Pokémon: To Be a Pokémon Master, known in Japan as Pocket Monsters: Aim to Be a Pokémon Master, (Note: In Japanese: ポケットモンスター めざせポケモンマスター, Pocket Monsters Mezase Pokémon Master) on September 8, 2023. In Canada, the season aired from May 28, 2022, to July 29, 2023.

The season culminates the research fellowship adventures of Ash Ketchum and Goh, as they travel across all eight regions, including the new Galar region from Pokémon Sword and Shield and the Galar region's Crown Tundra from Pokémon Sword and Shield: The Crown Tundra. Ash ascends through the ranks of the World Coronation Series to enter the Master Class and Goh continues his work with Project Mew to be a Chaser and find Mew. In the final part, Ash travels with his old friends Misty and Brock.

Pokémon: The Arceus Chronicles (Note: In Japanese: Pocket Monsters: Arceus, the One Called God (ポケットモンスター 神とよばれし アルセウス, Poketto Monsutā shin to yoba reshi Aruseusu)) is a set of four special episodes based on the Pokémon Legends: Arceus game, released on January 21 and 28, 2022, in Japan on Amazon Prime Video. These episodes debuted on Netflix on September 23, 2022.

This marked the final season to feature Ash and Pikachu as the main characters, as well as the Team Rocket trio. Starting with the next season, Pokémon Horizons: The Series, which premiered in Japan in April 2023, two new main characters were introduced, Liko and Roy.

== Episode list ==
Jap. overall (Note: The English episode numbers are based on their first streaming in the United States on Netflix. Other English-speaking nations largely follow either this order or the Japanese order. Episodes released on Netflix in the U.S. are released quarterly while those on TV networks outside of the U.S. are aired weekly.)	Eng. overall	No. in season	English title Japanese title	Original release date	English release date
Pokémon Ultimate Journeys: The Series
1178	1171	1	"The Spectral Express! (The Ghost Train Departs...)"; Transliteration: "Gōsuto Ressha, Shuppatsu, da yo..." (Japanese: ゴースト列車、出発、だよ...)	December 17, 2021	October 21, 2022
While heading to Stow-on-Side via train, Ash accidentally bumps into Allister, who loses his train ticket. Ash and Goh try to return Allister's ticket, but the latter flees and enters the ghost train. Ash and Goh also enter the ghost train, but Ash becomes possessed by a spirit after he touches a Spiritomb stone. The spirit is eventually returned to the Spiritomb stone, and the two boys arrive at their destination. However, Allister and the ghost train disappear right after it arrives at Stow-on-Side.
1179	1172	2	"The Winding Path to Greatness! (Gangar Does Its Best! The Road to Kyodaimax!!)"; Transliteration: "Gengā Ganbaru! Kyodaimakkusu e no Michi!!" (Japanese: ゲンガー頑張る！キョダイマックスへの道！！)	December 24, 2021	October 21, 2022
Ash and Goh meet up with Allister to ask for his help in getting Ash's Gengar to achieve its Gigantamax form. Allister agrees and takes the boys to the stadium. There, Gengar only dynamaxes instead of transforming into its Gigantamax form. Allister explains that Gengar must consume Max Soup made from Max Mushrooms in order to Gigantamax. The trio head out to collect three clusters of Max Mushrooms that are required. After the Max Mushrooms are gathered, Allister starts preparing the soup. The next day, Gengar drinks the Max Soup and gains the ability to gigantamaxed.
1180	1173	3	"It's All in the Name! (Your Name is Francoise)"; Transliteration: "Kimi no Na wa Furansowāzu" (Japanese: 君の名はフランソワーズ)	January 14, 2022	October 21, 2022
Professor Cerise's assistant, Ren, recounts the first time he met his Magnemite, Francois. Meanwhile, in Vermilion City, multiple Magnemite start behaving abnormally due to a geomagnetic storm. The English dubbed episode was dedicated in memory of Billy Kametz, who died on June 9, 2022.
1181	1174	4	"Suffering the Flings and Arrows! (The Heracross Loss, the Kailios in Love)"; Transliteration: "Herakurosu Rosu, Koisuru Kairosu" (Japanese: ヘラクロスロス、恋するカイロス)	January 21, 2022	October 21, 2022
When Goh returns from the Unova region with a new Pokémon, a Lilligant, his Heracross immediately becomes attracted to it. This causes Goh's Pinsir to feel dejected. Ash, Goh, and Chloe attend a Pokémon flower arrangement class hosted by Erika, the Celadon Gym Leader, to help Pinsir win over Heracross.
1182	1175	5	"The Good, The Bad, and The Lucky! (Farewell! The Wandering Rocket Gang!)"; Transliteration: "Saraba! Sasurai no Roketto-dan!" (Japanese: サラバ！さすらいのロケット団！)	January 28, 2022	October 21, 2022
When the Team Rocket trio suffer another failed attempt to catch Pikachu, they become fed up with their countless past failures. On their way to complain to those in charge about their vending machine, they meet up with their old rivals Cassidy and Butch, who have both left Team Rocket organization and have gone their separate ways. Cassidy tells the trio that there is more to life than Team Rocket. As a result, the trio temporarily disband, but later reunite.
1183	1176	6	"Lighting the Way Home! (Reach Space! Denryu's Light!!)"; Transliteration: "Uchū ni Todoke! Denryū no Hikari!!" (Japanese: 宇宙にとどけ！デンリュウの光！！)	February 4, 2022	October 21, 2022
Ash and Goh arrive in Hoenn and meet up with Sophocles, who is working on a project to bring a space probe, known as Talonflame 2, back to earth. The trio work together to ensure that the space probe has a safe return.
1184	1177	7	"An Evolution in Taste! (Yadoking! Curry Encounter!!)"; Transliteration: "Yadokingu! Karē Naru Sōgū!!" (Japanese: ヤドキング！カレーなる遭遇！！)	February 11, 2022	October 21, 2022
Ash and Goh make a second visit to Slowpoke Island. While there, a group of Galarian Slowpoke, along with a Galarian Slowbro and Slowking also arrive on the island and intend on becoming acquainted with their Kantonian counterparts. Later, Ash and Goh become possessed by the crowns of the two Slowking and have a rap battle, whilst also making a special curry udon dish in the process.
1185	1178	8	"Out of Their Elements! (Pokémon Circus! Booster and Thunders!!)"; Transliteration: "Pokemon Sākasu! Būsutā to Sandāsu!!" (Japanese: ポケモンサーカス！ブースターとサンダース！！)	February 18, 2022	October 21, 2022
Ash, Goh and Chloe are invited to be special guests in a Pokémon circus. At the site of the event, the two performers, Harmony, who likes Fire types, intends on evolving her Eevee into a Flareon. Meanwhile, Billy, who likes Electric types, plans to evolve his Eevee into a Jolteon. However, the performers accidentally evolve their Pokémon into the opposite forms. Despite a few obstacles, Harmony and Billy are able to pull of a successful show. Chloe is given a Thunder and Fire stone for potential use in the future.
1186	1179	9	"Battling Turned Up to Eleven! (Mary from Spiketown!)"; Transliteration: "Supaikutaun no Marī!" (Japanese: スパイクタウンのマリィ！)	February 25, 2022	October 21, 2022
Ash travels to Spikemuth in Galar for his next World Coronation Series match against Marnie. Ash and Goh meet Piers, who redirects Ash to Wyndon instead. Ash arrives just in time, and the battle against him and Marnie gets underway. Ash sends out Gengar while Marnie uses Grimmsnarl. After exchanging a few attacks, Marnie gigantamaxes her Grimmsnarl into Gigantamax Grimmsnarl, with Ash gigantamaxing Gengar into Gigantamax Gengar sometime later. Both Pokémon return to their normal forms, and Gengar eventually finishes off Grimmsnarl with a Shadow Ball, giving Ash another victory and improving his rank to 15.
1187	1180	10	"Meeting Up with the Monarch! (Adhesion! Dande's Special Training!!)"; Transliteration: "Mitchaku! Dande no Supesharu Torēningu!!" (Japanese: 密着！ダンデのスペシャルトレーニング！！)	March 4, 2022	October 21, 2022
The day after his World Coronation Series match against Marnie, Ash heads off to watch Leon's World Coronation Series battle against Sinnoh Elite Four member Flint. After the battle ends in Leon's favor, Leon invites Ash to join him in a training session. In the meantime, Goh visits the Wild Area to catch new Pokémon and meets up with Sonia.
1188	1181	11	"A One-Stick Wonder! (The One Stick, Bacchinkey!)"; Transliteration: "Sutikku Ippon, Bachinkī!" (Japanese: スティック一本、バチンキー！)	March 11, 2022	October 21, 2022
Ash and Goh spend the night in the Wild Area when they come across a wild Thwackey with only one stick. They soon meet up with the group that the Thwackey hangs out with, which includes a bunch of other Thwackey along with a Grookey and a Rillaboom. The boys discover that the first Thwackey they had met is unable to drum to a rhythmic beat due to it only having one stick. So, Ash, Goh and Goh's Grookey decide to help the Thwackey learn how to drum with just a singular stick.
1189	1182	12	"Battling in the Freezing Raid! (Trial Mission! A Frozen Raid Battle!!)"; Transliteration: "Toraiaru Misshon! Hyōketsu no Reido Batoru!!" (Japanese: トライアルミッション！氷結のレイドバトル！！)	March 18, 2022	October 21, 2022
Goh's next Project Mew assignment is to have a Raid Battle against the Legendary Pokémon Articuno. Ash and Goh head to the Seafoam Islands to search for Articuno. Goh reunites with his friend, Horace, who is also a Project Mew challenger. Gary also appears and joins the other boys in the search for Articuno. Once they find the Legendary Pokémon, the boys join forces and have a battle against Articuno. Eventually, Articuno flees, ultimately ending the Raid Battle. For completing the mission, Goh, Gary, and Horace are rewarded with Project Mew tokens.
1190	1183	13	"The Future is Now, Thanks to Strategy! (Satoshi and Citron! Great Special Friendship Training!!)"; Transliteration: "Satoshi to Shitoron! Yūjō Dai Tokkun!!" (Japanese: サトシとシトロン！友情大特訓！！)	April 1, 2022	February 24, 2023
Ash and Goh have arrived in Kalos, where Ash has agreed to reunite with Clemont and Bonnie. On his way to Lumiose City, Ash discovers that his next World Coronation Series battle is set for the next day and will be against Drasna, one of the Kalos Elite Four members. Ash eventually meets up with Clemont, with Goh and Bonnie arriving some time later. Ash's Sirfetch'd attempts to learn the most powerful Meteor Assault, but it fails initially. With some training, Sirfetch'd masters its new move. After the training session, Ash and Clemont have a double battle, which results in a victory for Ash.
1191	1184	14	"Taking Two for the Team! (Hyper Class! Vs. Elite Four Dracaena!!)"; Transliteration: "Haipā Kurasu! Buiesu Shiten'nō Dorasena!!" (Japanese: ハイパークラス！VS四天王ドラセナ！！)	April 1, 2022	February 24, 2023
The World Coronation Series battle between Ash and Drasna begins with Ash starting off with Sirfetch'd, while Drasna brings out her Noivern. After Sirfetch'd struggles, Ash swaps it for Dracovish. Drasna also switches Noivern in favor of Altaria, which becomes Mega Altaria moments later. Dracovish isn't able to do much, so Ash brings Sirfetch'd back out. Sirfetch'd takes out Mega Altaria with a Meteor Assault, but is left whihout energy, resulting a draw. Noivern and Dracovish are brought back out. The two Pokémon clash with super effectives Dragon Pulse and Dragon Rush, with Noivern fainting from the hard hit. Ash earns himself another victory and rises to 9th overall in the standings.
1192	1185	15	"Reuniting for the First Time! (Eievui and Nymphia! Encounter and Reunion!!)"; Transliteration: "Ībui to Ninfia! Deai to Saikai!!" (Japanese: イーブイとニンフィア！出会いと再会！！)	April 8, 2022	February 24, 2023
Chloe heads off to the Hoenn region after hearing about a Trainer with a Sylveon. Once there, Chloe meets Lisia, who asks her to join the local Pokémon Contest. Chloe also runs into Ash's childhood friend Serena, who encourages her to participate in the contest. Ash and Goh are on their way to the contest hall when they are suddenly approached by Wallace, who challenges Ash to a Pokémon battle, which Ash ends up winning, but after the battle causes him and Goh to miss the contest. Chloe, Serena, and Lisia all perform in the Pokémon contest, with Serena and Lisia tying for first place. While Chloe and Serena say their goodbyes, Ash and Goh both run past Serena to get on a boat with Chloe. Ash and Serena briefly reunite and share their respective goals before separating.
1193	1186	16	"Radio Lulled the Mischievous Stars! (A New Program! The Rocket Gang Undercover Kingdom Radio!!)"; Transliteration: "Shin Bangumi! Roketto-dan Naisho Ōkoku Rajio!!" (Japanese: 新番組！ロケット団ないしょ王国ラジオ！！)	April 15, 2022	February 24, 2023
When the Team Rocket trio is ordered by Giovanni to recruit new members to Team Rocket, they launch a late night radio show in the hopes of having their viewers join the organization. When they fail to get any recruits, they make some alterations to make their program more popular, having completely forgotten their goal to attract new members.
1194	1187	17	"Big Brother to the Rescue! (Help Us, Big Bro Wanpachi!)"; Transliteration: "Tasukete, Wanpachi no Aniki!" (Japanese: 助けて、ワンパチのアニキ！)	April 22, 2022	February 24, 2023
While spending the day at Cerise Park, Yamper is responsible for resolving any issues amongst the Pokémon residing at the park. Later on, Ash receives a notification for his next World Coronation Series match against Raihan, with the possibility of being promoted to the Master Class.
1195	1188	18	"Catching the Aura of Fate! (Lucario and Gekkouga! The Wave Guidance of Fate!!)"; Transliteration: "Rukario to Gekkōga! Unmei no Hadō!" (Japanese: ルカリオとゲッコウガ！運命の波導！！)	April 29, 2022	February 24, 2023
After Ash and Lucario prepare for their upcoming battle against Raihan, Goh's Froakie suddenly evolves into a Frogadier. Ash is reminded of his own Greninja and decides to head to Kalos to have Lucario learn some new techniques from Greninja. Later on, Ash and Lucario both feel Greninja's presence. When a bunch of roots appear and starts attacking Lucario, Greninja appears. Lucario and Greninja have a battle, but Lucario isn't able to keep up with Greninja's speed. Frustrated, Lucario runs off and is followed by Greninja. Greninja finds Lucario and starts teaching Lucario how to improve its aura abilities. When the two Pokémon detect that Ash and Goh are in danger, they immediately run back to protect the boys. Mega Lucario and Greninja join forces and take down the roots with a combination of Aura Sphere and Water Shuriken. With the situation now resolved, Ash and Lucario thank Greninja for its help and bid it farewell, with the latter disappearing back into the forest.
1196	1189	19	"Aim for the Eight! (VS Kibana! Battle for Masters Eight!!)"; Transliteration: "VS Kibana! Masutāzueito o kaketa tatakai!!" (Japanese: VSキバナ！マスターズエイトをかけた戦い！！)	May 6, 2022	February 24, 2023
Ash arrives in the Galar region for his World Coronation Series promotion match against Raihan. Ash ultimately wins the battle and is promoted to the Master Class, joining the Unova League Champion Iris; the Lumiose Conference Champion Alain; the Kalos League Champion Diantha; the Kanto and Johto Leagues Champion Lance; the Hoenn League Champion Steven; the Sinnoh League Champion Cynthia; and the Monarch and Galar League Champion Leon in the Master Class.
1197	1190	20	"Narrowing the Chaser Chase! (Battle Royale Betrayal!)"; Transliteration: "Uragiri no Batturu Royaru!" (Japanese: 裏切りのバトルロイヤル！)	May 13, 2022	February 24, 2023
Goh's next Project Mew trial mission is a battle royale against other Project Mew members, with the mission taking place at Sea Mauville. During the trial, Goh encounters his friend Horace, and they team up to take on the remaining trainers. Goh and Horace wind up as the last two trainers, and Horace decides that he wants to withdraw in order for Goh to be declared the winner. However, Goh convinces Horace to battle him, with the battle resulting in Goh's defeat. Horace receives three tokens for being the winner, while Goh receives two tokens.
1198	1191	21	"The Homecoming Crown! (Mohn and Lilie, Snowfield Reunion)"; Transliteration: "Moon to Riirie, Setsugen no Saikai" (Japanese: モーンとリーリエ、雪原の再会)	May 20, 2022	February 24, 2023
Ash, Goh, and Chloe head to the Crown Tundra after hearing reports of a mysterious Pokémon. Lillie, Gladion and Lusamine also make their way to the Crown Tundra to continue their search for Mohn. Lillie and her family eventually find Mohn at a cabin, but he has no memory of them due to having amnesia caused from the accident that sent him away from his family many years earlier. Mohn reveals that he's been living with a Nihilego, which he believes is actually Lillie. Ash, Goh and Chloe also joins them. Lillie and Gladion restore their father's memories by making him look at a reflection of himself. The reunited family catches the Nihilego that is revealed to have saved Mohn during the accident. With the search for Mohn complete, the family decides to return to Alola.
1199	1192	22	"Helping the Hometown Hero! (A Triumphant Return! The Alola Champion!!)"; Transliteration: "Gaisen! Arora Champion!!" (Japanese: 凱旋！ アローラチャンピオン！！)	May 27, 2022	February 24, 2023
Lillie and her family, along with Ash, Goh and Chloe return to the Alola region and reunite with their friends from the Pokémon school. In the following day, Ash, Professor Kukui, Kiawe and Gladion all participate in a Battle Royal. Kiawe and Gladion are the first to be eliminated from the battle, while Ash and Professor Kukui both use special Z-Moves to finish off the battle. However, the winner of the battle is unknown. In the evening, Ash has a brief encounter with Tapu Koko, with the guardian deity wishing Ash success in the upcoming Masters Eight Tournament.
1200	1193	23	"Chasing to the Finish! (The Last Mission! Catch Regieleki and Regidrago!!)"; Transliteration: "Rasuto Misshon! Regieleki Regidorago o Getto Seyo!!" (Japanese: ラストミッション！ レジエレキ・レジドラゴをゲットせよ！！)	June 3, 2022	February 24, 2023
For Goh's final Project Mew Trial Mission, he elects to head to the Crown Tundra to go after Regieleki and Regidrago. Goh reunites with Gary, and the two head into the Ruins of Decision. Goh and Gary are forced to work together after they are ambushed by fellow Project Mew members. The two defeat Sterling and Lyla in a battle, allowing them to have a crack at capturing the Legendary Pokémon first. Goh and Gary eventually capture Regieleki and Regidrago respectively and pass the Trial Mission, with the both of them earning three Mew tokens. Goh and Gary both qualify as Chasers along with Horace.
1201	1194	24	"Friends, Rivals, Lend Me Your Spirit! (Training Battle of Flames! Satoshi VS Shinji!!)"; Transliteration: "Honou no Tokkun Batoru! Satoshi tai Shinji!!" (Japanese: 炎の特訓バトル！サトシ対シンジ！！)	June 10, 2022	February 24, 2023
Ash and Goh make their way to Professor Oak's lab and reunite with Ash's Pokémon from his past journeys. In a forest nearby, Ash and Paul become reacquainted for the first time since their battle in the Sinnoh League Lily of the Valley Conference. While all the Pokémon are elsewhere to train, Ash challenges Paul to a battle, which Paul accepts, declaring that it will be a three-on-three with no switching. Ash starts off the battle by sending out Lucario first, while Paul sends out his Gyarados. Gyarados initially gets the upper hand on Lucario, but it gets taken out by Lucario's newly learned Bullet Punch. The next match up is between Ash's Dragonite and Paul's Garchomp, with Dragonite eventually being knocked out. In the last battle, Gengar goes up against Paul's Metagross. After taking a beating, Gengar uses its new Will-O-Wisp attack along with a Shadow Ball to defeat Metagross. Ash wins the battle, having earned two out of three wins. After Paul leaves, it is revealed that Paul had received an offer to become Gym Leader, which is why he came to learn more about Pokémon from Professor Oak. With more confidence, Ash is eager to head to Galar for the World Coronation Series Masters Eight Tournament.
1202	1195	25	"Curtain Up! Fight the Fights! (Opening! Masters Tournament!!)"; Transliteration: "Kaimaku! Masutaazu Toonamento!!" (Japanese: 開幕！マスターズトーナメント！！)	June 17, 2022	February 24, 2023
The World Coronation Series Masters Eight Tournament finally officially commences, but not before the eight members of the Master Class are introduced in an opening ceremony. After the introductions, the first round match-ups are revealed. Leon is pit against Alain, Lance will face Diantha, Cynthia is matched up against Iris, and Ash will take on Steven. Next, the first battle between the Monarch and Galar League Champion Leon and Lumiose Conference Champion Alain begins. Alain fails to take control for the entirety of the battle and his ace Pokémon Mega Charizard X is knocked out by Leon's own Charizard in the last match-up, eliminating Alain from the tournament. With the win, Leon advances to the semifinals.
1203	1196	26	"Pride of a Champion! (Champions' Pride! Wataru VS Carnet!!)"; Transliteration: "Champion no Hokori! Wataru VS Carnet!!" (Japanese: チャンピオンの誇り！ワタルVSカルネ！！)	July 8, 2022	February 24, 2023
The next battle of the Masters Eight Tournament between the Kanto and Johto Leagues Champion Lance and Kalos League Champion Diantha begins. Lance takes an early lead when his Dragonite overpowers Diantha's Aurorus. Diantha sends out Gourgeist, while Lance's next Pokémon is his shiny Gyarados. The battle becomes tied after Gourgeist defeats Gyarados. Next, Lance sends out Hydreigon and takes out Gourgeist, helping him earn a 2–1 lead. Diantha's last Pokémon is her ace, Gardevoir, which immediately mega evolves into Mega Gardevoir. Mega Gardevoir deals a super effective Moonblast and takes out Hydreigon, tying the battle once again. Dragonite returns to the battle and dynamaxes into Dynamax Dragonite. However, Dragonite isn't able to take the upper hand and ends up being defeated. Along with Leon, Diantha advances to the semifinals.
1204	1197	27	"The Fiery Road to Mastership! (VS Shirona! Iris' Road to Dragon Master!!)"; Transliteration: "VS Shirona! Iris Dragon Master e no Michi!!" (Japanese: VSシロナ！アイリスドラゴンマスターへの道！！)	July 15, 2022	February 24, 2023
The third battle between the Unova League Champion Iris and Sinnoh League Champion Cynthia gets underway. Iris draws first blood when her Excadrill takes out Cynthia's Gastrodon. Cynthia's next Pokémon, Milotic, quickly defeats Excadrill with a single Hydro Pump. Iris chooses Dragonite as her second Pokémon. Milotic wraps itself around Dragonite and knocks it out with an Iron Head, leaving Iris with just one last Pokémon. Next, Iris' Haxorus manages to take out Milotic, tying the battle. For her last Pokémon, Cynthia chooses Garchomp, which eventually mega evolves into Mega Garchomp. With the battle nearing its end, Iris calls for a Dragon Pulse, with Cynthia's Garchomp responding with a Draco Meteor. Haxorus eventually faints, leading to Cynthia's victory and advancement to the semifinals.
1205	1198	28	"Battling as Hard as Stone! (Satoshi Heads Into Battle! VS Daigo!!)"; Transliteration: "Satoshi Shutsujin! VS Daigo!!" (Japanese: サトシ出陣！VSダイゴ！！)	July 22, 2022	June 23, 2023
The final match of the first round of the Masters Eight Tournament between the Alola League Champion Ash Ketchum and the Hoenn League Champion Steven Stone begins. Ash's Dracovish initially goes up against Steven's Metagross, but Metagross is swapped for Aggron, who then proceeds to knock out Dracovish. Ash's Gengar slows down Steven's momentum by firing Aggron's Rock Tomb back at it, resulting in Aggron's defeat. However, Gengar is eventually taken out by Steven's Cradily, giving Steven's his second lead of the battle. Pikachu is able to avenge his fallen teammates by eliminating Cradily. In response, Steven unleashes Metagross's Mega Evolution into Mega Metagross, but it is unable to withstand Pikachu's 10,000,000 Volt Thunderbolt. Ash defeats Steven and moves on to the semifinals to face Cynthia.
1206	—	29	"Koharu and Eievui - The Miracle of Evolution"; Transliteration: "Koharu and Eevee - Shinka no Kiseki" (Japanese: コハルとイーブイ しんかのきせき)	July 29, 2022	—
A recap of the adventures of Koharu and her Eievui.
1207	1199	30	"Infinite Possibilities! (Koharu and Eievui, the Possibilities are Endless!)"; Transliteration: "Koharu to Eievui, Kanousei wa Mugendai!" (Japanese: コハルとイーブイ、可能性は無限大！)	August 5, 2022	June 23, 2023
Despite having met all the evolutionary forms of Eevee, Chloe is still uncertain about which path her Eevee will choose, as well as what Pokémon evolution even is. After learning about her father's experience with Pokémon, Chloe decides that she wants to gain a better understanding of Pokémon evolution.
1208	—	31	"The Climax Begins! Satoshi's Masters Tournament Experience!!"; Transliteration: "Saikouchou Shidou! Satoshi no Master Tournament!!" (Japanese: 最高潮始動！サトシのマスターズトーナメント！！)	August 12, 2022	—
A review of the Masters Eight Tournament Quarterfinals, and an analysis on each of the remaining four competitors.
1209	1200	32	"It's... Champion Time! (The Semifinals I: Overwhelming Victory)"; Transliteration: "Semifainaru I: "Asshō"" (Japanese: セミファイナルI「圧勝」)	August 26, 2022	June 23, 2023
On the day of the Masters Eight Tournament Semifinals, Ash starts preparing for his upcoming match against Cynthia. Ash and Goh cross paths with Cynthia, who tells them how she first met her Pokémon partner Garchomp. Meanwhile, the full semifinal battle between Leon and Diantha has gotten underway. Ultimately, Leon takes down Diantha a commanding 6–2 victory to move on to the finals.
1210	1201	33	"Bewitch, Battle, and Bewilder! (The Semifinals II: Dazzle)"; Transliteration: "Semifainaru II: "Genwaku"" (Japanese: セミファイナルII「幻惑」)	September 2, 2022	June 23, 2023
Ash and Cynthia begin their full semifinal battle. Ash falls into an early deficit, losing both Dragonite and Gengar to Cynthia's Spiritomb. Pikachu is able to take out Cynthia's Gastrodon despite having a type disadvantage. However, after Spiritomb is defeated by Pikachu, the latter is also knocked out of the battle due to Spiritomb's Destiny Bond.
1211	1202	34	"Valor: A Strategic Part of Battling! (The Semifinals III: Valor)"; Transliteration: "Semifainaru III: "Buyū"" (Japanese: セミファイナルIII「武勇」)	September 9, 2022	June 23, 2023
After Pikachu's sudden knockout, Ash turns to his last three remaining Pokémon. Dracovish and Sirfetch'd each take out Cynthia's Roserade and Milotic respectively. However, Sirfetch'd is eventually defeated by Garchomp, leaving Ash with just Lucario. The battle enters its climax when Cynthia shockingly elects to dynamaxing her Togekiss in place to mega evolving her Garchomp.
1212	1203	35	"Whittle While You Work! (The Semifinals IV: Impact)"; Transliteration: "Semifainaru IV: "Shōgeki"" (Japanese: セミファイナルIV「衝撃」)	September 16, 2022	June 23, 2023
After Cynthia's surprise choice of dynamaxing her Togekiss, Ash activates Lucario's Mega Evolution into Mega Lucario. In a fierce battle where Dynamax Togekiss refuses to give in, Mega Lucario launches a G-Max Aura Sphere to shot down Dynamax Togekiss returning the normal form and manages to take it down with his super effective Bullet Punch. Cynthia brings Garchomp back out as her final Pokémon. To close out the battle, Cynthia's calls for a Dragon Claw, while Ash commands Mega Lucario to use Reversal. Both Pokémon take the hit from their opponent, but Mega Lucario is able to pull through. Ash defeats Cynthia and moves on to the finals to face Leon.
1213	—	36	"GO FOR DREAM! Go's Road to Mew!!"; Transliteration: "GO FOR DREAM! Gō, Yume e no Michi!!" (Japanese: GO FOR DREAM！ゴウ、夢への道！！)	September 23, 2022	—
When Goh accidentally leaves his Rotom Phone in the hotel room where he and Ash are staying, a suspicious shadow unlocks the device and starts reviewing events of Goh's adventure so far. The shadow is later revealed to be Goh's Grookey.
1214	1204	37	"Just a Scone's Throw From Here! (Go and Aceburn! The Place of Beginning!!)"; Transliteration: "Gō to Aceburn! Hajimari no Basho!!" (Japanese: ゴウとエースバーン！はじまりの場所！！)	September 30, 2022	June 23, 2023
Goh reunites with his Eternatus and chooses to leave it under Leon's care. Afterwards, Ash and Goh revisit the place where Goh had first met his Cinderace, leading them to reconnect with Cinderace's former friends. After a confrontation with Team Rocket trio, Goh is summoned by Project Mew's final mission, forcing him to miss Ash's final battle with Leon. The two promise to be smiling when they meet again.
1215	—	38	"Climax! The Night Before the Decisive Battle! Satoshi VS Dande!!"; Transliteration: "Saikōchō! Kessen Zen'ya Satoshi VS Dande!!" (Japanese: 最高潮！決戦前夜サトシVSダンデ！！)	October 14, 2022	—
The battles from the Masters Eight Tournament Semifinals and the teams for Ash and Leon are reviewed.
1216	1205	39	"A Flood of Torrential Gains! (The Finals I: "Torrent")"; Transliteration: "Fainaru I: "Gekiryū"" (Japanese: ファイナルI「激流」)	October 21, 2022	June 23, 2023
Goh travels to Hoenn for his final assignment for Project Mew. Meanwhile, Ash and Leon begin their full battle in the Masters Eight Tournament Finals, Chloe and Dawn have come to watch the finals to support for Ash, with Leon allowing Ash to use Mega Evolution, Z-Move and Dynamax. In the battle, Gigantamax Gengar takes down Leon's Inteleon before returning to his normal form, but Gengar is later frozen and knocked out by the opposing Mr. Rime.
1217	1206	40	"Toying With Your Motions! (The Finals II: "Toy Around")"; Transliteration: "Fainaru II: "Honrō"" (Japanese: ファイナルII「翻弄」)	October 28, 2022	June 23, 2023
Ash and Leon continue their final battle, with Ash's Mega Lucario defeating Mr. Rime. As the battle goes on, Leon's strategy begins to toy with Ash. After Mega Lucario is knocked out by Dragapult, Dragonite avenges its teammate by finishing off Dragapult with its super effective special Draco Meteor technique, giving Ash a 3–2 lead. For his next Pokémon, Leon brings out his Rillaboom.
1218	1207	41	"Paring Pokémon While Parrying! (The Finals III: "The Strongest")"; Transliteration: "Fainaru III: "Saikyō"" (Japanese: ファイナルIII「最強」)	November 4, 2022	June 23, 2023
After Leon's Dragapult is defeated, Leon gains some momentum and begins to turn the tables. Ash's Dragonite and Sirfetch'd are taken down by Rillaboom, who is then knocked out by Dracovish. However, Dracovish is beaten by Leon's type-jumping Cinderace moments later. With just one last Pokémon remaining, Ash sends in Pikachu to go up against Charizard who gigantamaxes into Gigantamax Charizard. After each Pokémon uses their strongest attacks between Z-Move and G-Max Move, the colide causes Eternatus to reawaken and interfere with the intense final battle.
1219	1208	42	"Partners in Time! (The Finals IV: "Partner")"; Transliteration: "Fainaru IV: "Aibō"" (Japanese: ファイナルIV「相棒」)	November 11, 2022	June 23, 2023
Eternatus arrives over the Wyndon Stadium to stabilize the Galar particles caused by the final battle before leaving. Ash and Leon have their Dynamax Bands recharged by Eternatus, leading to a Gigantamax battle between Gigantamax Pikachu and Gigantamax Cinderace, which ends in Pikachu's favor. Pikachu then goes up against Charizard and, despite putting up a fierce and exhausted final battle, is almost defeated. However, Pikachu becomes motivated after Ash and all of Ash's Pokémon cheering for him in the subconscious, allowing him the to get back up and deliver a last and most powerful Thunderbolt on Charizard and the latter delivers a full power Fire Blast back on Pikachu. After the final collide, Pikachu manages to defeat Charizard, resulting in Ash's victory over Leon and making him the new World Coronation Series Champion, the new Monarch and the first-ever World Champion.
1220	1209	43	"The Mew from Here! (Project Mew)"; Transliteration: "Project Mew" (Japanese: プロジェクト・ミュウ)	November 25, 2022	June 23, 2023
The Project Mew team sets out for Faraway Island to commence their search for Mew. After being separated into two different groups, Gary and Quillon encounter a Groudon, while Goh, Horace and Danika come across a Kyogre.
1221	1210	44	"In the Palms of our Hands! (Seize the Future!)"; Transliteration: "Tsukamitoru Mirai!" (Japanese: つかみとる未来！)	December 2, 2022	June 23, 2023
The Chasers of Project Mew are forced to confront Groudon and Kyogre. Mew reveals itself after disguising itself as the Hoenn Legendaries. Mew launches attacks at the Project Mew team until Goh thanks it for inspiring him to set off on his journey. After the Project Mew team has achieved its goal, Goh, Gary, Horace, Quillon and Danika all go their separate ways.
1222	1211	45	"Heroes Unite! (Pokémon! I'm Glad I Got to Meet You!)"; Transliteration: "Pokemon! Kimi ni Aete Yokatta!" (Japanese: ポケモン！きみにあえてよかった！)	December 9, 2022	June 23, 2023
Ash and Goh return to Kanto and reveal their intentions on starting new adventures without each other. However, Goh is unwilling to tell Ash his plan, as he doesn't want to quit his friendship with him. When Ash publicly announces his decision to continue his journey in lone, Goh becomes upset due to the feeling of betrayal. The dispute between the two friends is paused when Lugia suddenly appears, prompting Ash and Goh to begin a Raid Battle with it.
1223	1212	46	"This Could be the Start of Something Big! (Satoshi and Go! Setting Off on a New Journey!!)"; Transliteration: "Satoshi to Gō! Arata Naru o Tabidachi!!" (Japanese: サトシとゴウ！ 新たなるを旅立ち！！)	December 16, 2022	June 23, 2023
Following their reconciliation in the Raid Battle with Lugia, Ash and Goh leaves Professor Cerise's Lab and go their separate ways to embark on their new journeys, while Chloe becomes a new assistant researcher for her father.
Pokémon: To Be a Pokémon Master
1224	1213	47	"The Road Most Traveled! (Winds of Beginning! The Endless Road!!)"; Transliteration: "Hajimari no Kaze! Owari no Nai Michi!!" (Japanese: はじまりの風！ 終わりのない道!!)	January 13, 2023	September 8, 2023
While spending time out in the countryside, Ash comes across an injured Latias and helps it recover. Latias is initially skeptical of Ash, but after he rescues it from being captured by Team Rocket, Ash gains the trust of Latias, ending in the latter secretly following him.
1225	1214	48	"A Fated Face-Off! (Satoshi VS Kasumi! Seaside Battle One-on-One!!)"; Transliteration: "Satoshi VS Kasumi! Umibe no Ikki-uchi!!" (Japanese: サトシVSカスミ！うみべのいっきうち！！)	January 20, 2023	September 8, 2023
Ash arrives at a seashore and encounters a Clauncher. Before he can catch it though, Misty, one of Ash's old traveling partners, declares that she'll be the one to catch it. Ash and Misty have a Pokémon battle to decide who gets to catch Clauncher, with the battle ending in Misty's favor. Later on, Misty decides to travel with Ash again.
1226	1215	49	"Must Be Our Heroes and the Witch! (Takeshi and Dent and the Forest Witch!)"; Transliteration: "Takeshi to Dento to Mori no Majo!" (Japanese: タケシとデントともりのまじょ！)	January 27, 2023	September 8, 2023
Ash and Misty reunite with Brock and Cilan. When Brock becomes heartbroken, a wild Hatterene begins to play with his emotions. After Brock is rescued and he decides to rejoin Ash and Misty.
1227	1216	50	"Bearing Down Easy! (Tunbear's Sigh!)"; Transliteration: "Tunbear no Tameiki!" (Japanese: ツンベアーのためいき！)	February 3, 2023	September 8, 2023
Ash, Misty, and Brock encounter a Beartic that is unable to control its powers. Ash aids Beartic and successfully teaches it how to use its moves effectively.
1228	1217	51	"A Squad's Worth of Passion! (Burn! The Zenigame Fire Brigade!!)"; Transliteration: "Moeyo! Zenigame Shōbōdan!!" (Japanese: もえよ！ゼニガメしょうぼうだん！！)	February 10, 2023	September 8, 2023
Ash and his friends reunite with his Squirtle and the rest of its firefighting squad. Squirtle mistakes Ash for not caring about it and becomes upset with him. However, after saving the day by extinguishing a nearby fire with Ash, Bulbasaur and Charizard, Squirtle reconciles with its friends.
1229	1218	52	"The Same Moon, Now and Forever! (And We're Looking at the Same Moon!)"; Transliteration: "Soshite, Onaji Tsuki o Mite Iru!" (Japanese: そして、おなじ月をみている！)	February 17, 2023	September 8, 2023
While Ash and his friends are taking a break, Team Rocket suddenly appears and unsuccessfully steals Pikachu. The trio is sent blasting off along with Pikachu, but him and Meowth become separated from their respective groups and are forced to work with each other to find Ash and Team Rocket.
1230	1219	53	"Ride, Lapras, Ride! (Riding on Laplace♪)"; Transliteration: "Laplace ni Notte♪" (Japanese: ラプラスにのって♪)	February 24, 2023	September 8, 2023
Ash reunites with his Lapras that he had met on the Orange Islands. Lapras leads Ash and his friends over to an island where a Wailmer is trapped in a hole. The group manages to free Wailmer, and again after it had evolved into a Wailord. Eventually, Ash becomes trapped in a cave before being rescued by Lapras. At sunset, Lapras says its goodbyes to Ash once again and returns to its herd.
1231	1220	54	"Getting to the Heart of it All! (Juppeta's Search!)"; Transliteration: "Jupetta no Sagashi Mono!" (Japanese: ジュペッタのさがしもの！)	March 3, 2023	September 8, 2023
Ash, Misty, and Brock arrive in a town where heart-shaped objects are being taken from the town's residents by a Banette. The group discovers that Banette's motive for taking the items is because it used to wear a heart-shaped hair tie, which was gifted to it by its long-lost owner many years prior. Ash and his friends manage to reunite Banette with its owner, which turns out to be the local Nurse Joy.
1232	1221	55	"Rocket Revengers! (Rocket-dan Strikes Back!)"; Transliteration: "Gyakushū no Roketto-dan!" (Japanese: 逆襲のロケット団！)	March 10, 2023	September 8, 2023
The Team Rocket trio are given back the Pokémon that they had acquired from their past adventures from Giovanni. With all of their Pokémon together, they launch a counterattack to steal Pikachu once and for all. The trio initially goes well, but until the Latias that Ash had met earlier and has secretly following him the journey blasts Team Rocket trio off and saves Pikachu. After failing to steal Pikachu once again, the trio blames each other for their past failures and go their separate ways. Afterwards, Latias suddenly shows Ash and the others a vision of a Latios that is in danger.
1233	1222	56	"Ash and Latios! (Satoshi and Latios!)"; Transliteration: "Satoshi to Ratiosu!" (Japanese: サトシとラティオス！)	March 17, 2023	September 8, 2023
Ash and his friends rescue Latias and Latios from being pursued by a Pokémon Hunter.
1234	1223	57	"The Rainbow and the Pokémon Master!"; Transliteration: "Niji to Pokemon Masutā!" (Japanese: 虹とポケモンマスター！)	March 24, 2023	September 8, 2023
After rescuing Latias and Latios and saying goodbye to them, Misty and Brock both leave the group and return to their respective hometowns. Ash returns to Pallet Town for a few days and runs into Gary, who congratulates him for winning the World Coronation Series Masters Eight Tournament and asks him how much closer he is to becoming a Pokémon Master now that he is World Champion, which leaves Ash deep in thought. Meanwhile, the Team Rocket trio, reconciling following their separation by the argument, reunites and attempts to steal Pikachu for last time, only to have their plans foiled by Ash's Pidgeot, who was released by him before traveling to Valencia Island. Pidgeot then accepts Ash's offer to rejoin him on his journey. Later on, Ash reveals that being a champion was not his goal and that he still considers himself an aspiring Pokémon Master. He proclaims that in his opinion, a Pokémon Master is someone who can befriend all Pokémon in the world. With Pikachu by his side, Ash leaves Pallet Town and begins an endless journey.

=== Special episodes ===
Jap. overall	Eng. overall	No. in season	English title Japanese title	Original release date	English release date
SP–11	SP–6	SP–1	"The Arceus Chronicles (Part 1)" (Satoshi and Go! Let's Go to the Sinnoh Fest!!); Transliteration: "Satoshi to gō! Shin'oufesu ni gō! !" (Japanese: サトシとゴウ！シンオウフェスにゴー！！)	January 21, 2022	September 23, 2022
Ash and Goh arrive at Canalave City, where they meet Dawn and Cynthia as they participate in the Sinnoh Festival. Meanwhile, Team Galactic corners Heatran at Stark Mountain as Saturn catches it to enact their latest plan.
SP–12	SP–7	SP–2	"The Arceus Chronicles (Part 2)" (Rampaging Heatran!!); Transliteration: "Hīdoran bakushin! !" (Japanese: ヒードラン爆進！！)	January 21, 2022	September 23, 2022
Ash, Goh and Dawn, after getting a mysterious call for help from the Lake Guardians, meet with Brock. Team Galactic begins their plan to open a portal to bring back their leader Cyrus, but the intense power from the experiment causes Saturn's Heatran to go on a rampage as it escapes.
SP–13	SP–8	SP–3	"The Arceus Chronicles (Part 3)" (The Fierce Fighting at Mount Tengan!!); Transliteration: "Tengansan no dai nessen! !" (Japanese: テンガン山の大熱戦！！)	January 28, 2022	September 23, 2022
Ash, Dawn, and Goh, with help from Cynthia and Brock, try to stop Team Galactic, as well as save Heatran from its frenzied state, to no avail, then Arceus appears to the group's aid.
SP–14	SP–9	SP–4	"The Arceus Chronicles (Part 4)" (Miraculous Radiance! The Legend of Sinnoh!); Transliteration: "Kiseki no kagayaki! Shin'ō densetsu!" (Japanese: 奇跡の輝き！シンオウ伝説！)	January 28, 2022	September 23, 2022
Arceus uses its powers to impede Heatran as Ash, Goh, Dawn, Brock, and Cynthia work together to save the Legendary Pokemon and defeat Team Galactic's Commanders, leading to the team's rearrest and the five saving the Sinnoh region.
SP–15	SP–10	SP–5	"Distant Blue Sky! (Pocket Monsters: The Distant Blue Sky)"; Transliteration: "Poketto Monsutā: Haruka Naru Aoi Sora" (Japanese: ポケットモンスター 遥かなる青い空)	December 23, 2022	September 8, 2023
Set in the same continuity as I Choose You, The Power of Us, and Secrets of the Jungle instead of the anime TV series, Ash and Pikachu continue their adventure as they help out a boy named Sunny. Note: This special episode aired as the last episode of season 25 in the English dub.

== Music ==
The Japanese opening songs are "One, Two, Three" 1(ワン)・2(ツー)・3(スリー), Wan, Tsū, Surī) by Karaage Sisters for 9 episodes, and by Rika Matsumoto and Goh (Daiki Yamashita) for 37 episodes, and "Aim to Be a Pokémon Master -with my friends-" (めざせポケモンマスター -with my friends-, Mezase Pokémon Masutā -with my friends-) by Rika Matsumoto for 11 episodes. The ending songs are "Supereffective Type" (バツグンタイプ, Batsugun Taipu) by the Pokémon Music Club for 65 episodes, "One Hundred Fifty-One" (ひゃくごじゅういち, Hyakugojūichi) by Unshō Ishizuka for 6 episodes, "Takeshi's Paradise" (タケシのパラダイス, Takeshi no Paradaisu) by Yūji Ueda for 1 episode, "Riding on Lapras" (ラプラスにのって, Rapurasu ni Notte) by Mayumi Iizuka and Rikako Aikawa for 1 episode, "Face Forward Team Rocket!" (前向きロケット団！, Maemuki Roketto-dan) by Team Rocket (Jessie, James, Meowth and Wobbuffet) for 1 episode, "Type: Wild" (タイプ：ワイルド, Taipu: Wairudo) by Rika Matsumoto for 1 episode, in which the latter ending themes are taken from past seasons of the anime, and the English opening songs are "With You" by Echosmith, and "Gotta Catch ém All" by Ben Dixon and the Sad Truth with Haven Paschall and Hilary Thomas. These instrumental versions were served as ending themes.

== Awards ==
The series received the Anime Series of the Year award at the 4th VP Choice Awards, held in Pasig, Philippines, on March 29, 2023.
