= Greatest Events of WWII in Colour =

- Genre: Educational
- Based on: World War II
- Country of origin: United Kingdom
- Original language: English
- No. of seasons: 1
- No. of episodes: 10

Production
- Running time: Approximately 8 hours 33 minutes
- Production companies: Head Gear Films; Metrol Technology; World Media Rights Productions

Original release
- Network: Discovery/United Kingdom; n-tv/Germany; Planète+/France
- Release: 2019 – 2019

Greatest Events of WWII in Colour is a 10-episode British television docuseries recounting major events of World War II.

== Episodes ==
No.	Title
1	"Blitzkrieg"
2	"Battle of Britain"
3	"Pearl Harbor"
4	"Battle of Midway"
5	"Siege of Stalingrad"
6	"D-Day"
7	"Battle of the Bulge"
8	"Dresden Firestorm"
9	"Liberation of Buchenwald"
10	"Hiroshima"
