= Korean melodrama =

Korean film genre

Korean melodrama refers to a subgenre of melodrama films, which drew largely on native Korean narrative and theatrical forms through adaptations of traditional folk tales and pansori. This genre also drew its influences from Japanese theatrical "shimpa" and early Hollywood films.

== Korean vs. Western ==
In contrast to Western melodrama, the concept of suffering is a fundamental component. It is partly captured in the word han, which is a deep-seated feeling of sorrow, bitterness, or despair that originates in oppression or injustice which accumulates over time and remains unexpressed in the heart. It is believed by some to be a distinguishing characteristic of the Korean culture. Another distinguishing characteristic of Korean melodrama is the emphasis on family. While Western Melodrama tends to focus on the individual, the portrayal of the self in relation to the family in Korean Melodrama is significant. Early melodramatic texts typically dramatize the moral superiority of old values.

== History ==
Melodrama in Korea has been a dominant genre in the film industry since 1919. With early influences stemming from the Japanese theatrical shimpa (adapted from western melodrama), traditional folk tales such as pansori (an oral narrative poetry expressed in song) and Hollywood, Korean melodrama evolved from the 1920s up until the twenty first century.

=== Timeline ===
- 1910-45: Japanese colonialism subjected Koreans to violence, humiliation, and mass displacements. However, the Japanese simultaneously introduced shimpa. This new form of theater became widespread by the 1920s and greatly influenced Korean melodrama. Plots commonly revolving around heterosexual love, class differences, social change, and triumphing protagonists were central in both Japanese and Korean melodramas.
- 1950s: Hollywood films entered the Korean Film industry when the U.S. occupied Korea after World War II. There was a Korean Cinema boom and melodramas became very popular. During this time melodramas focused either on modernization or the issue of "free love"
- 1960s: Melodramas reached the peak of their popularity and focused on social issues such as highlighting economic struggles and class differences that divided society. Student uprisings were frequent and more grassroots protests for political and economic justice were prevalent which influenced the narration of Korean melodramas.
- 1970s: Melodramas reached its low point for the film industry. Melodramas focused on the mood of the society in general, revolving around women who served alcohol or worked as prostitutes
- 1980s: After a relaxation of censorship, melodramas depicted contemporary issues such as Korea's rapid development and the effects this had on the poor.
- 1990s: Melodramas tended to focus on romantic comedies and action pictures. Also a new concept of melodrama began to form. In 1998, Christmas in August redefined Korean melodrama.
