= Hokkaido Cultural Broadcasting =

Television station in Sapporo, Japan

JOBM-DTV
- Logo used since 1983

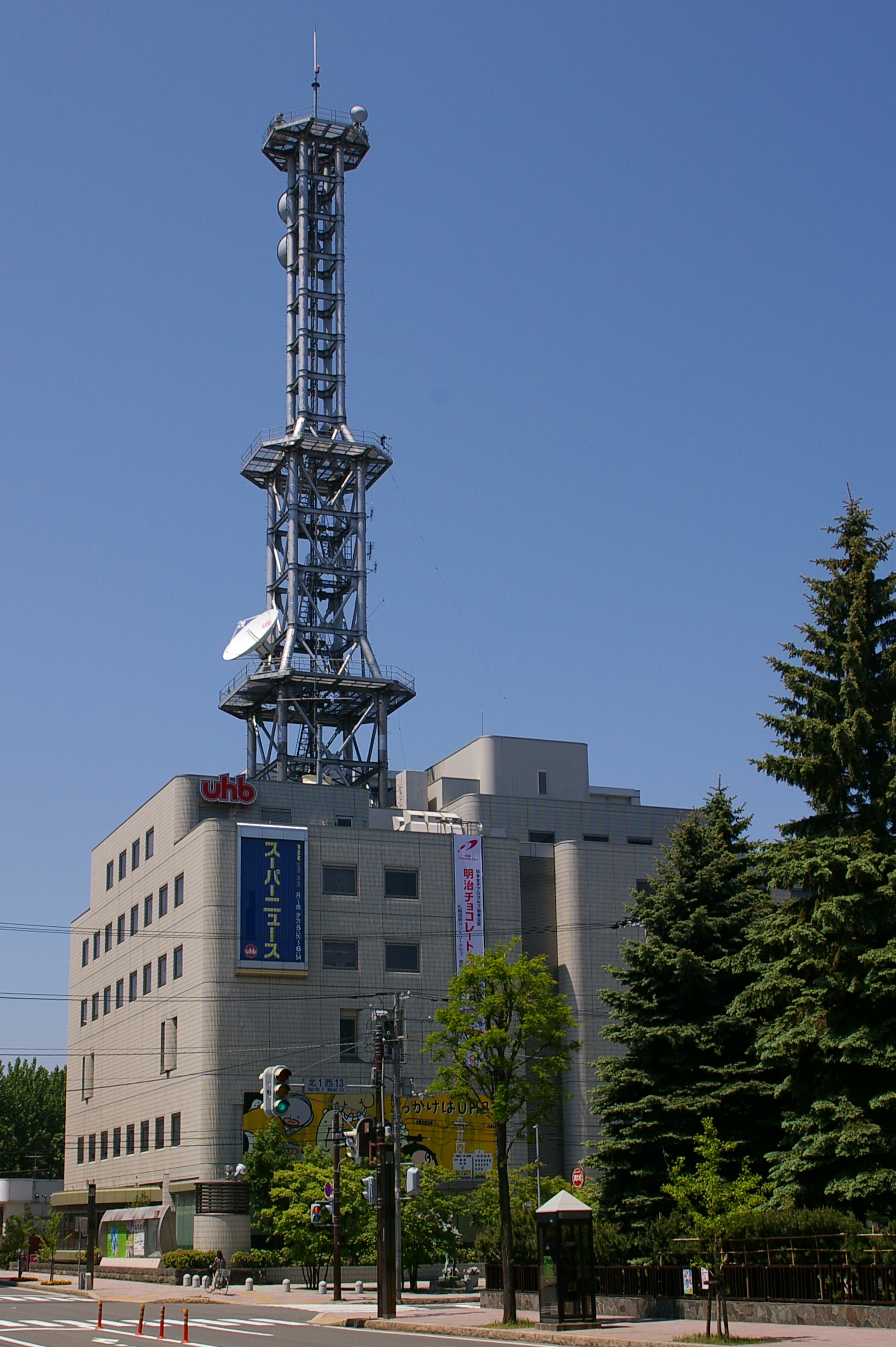
- Headquarters in Chūō-ku, Sapporo
- Hokkaido; Japan
- City: Sapporo
- Channels: Digital: 25 (UHF); Virtual: 8
- Branding: Hokkaido Cultural Broadcasting uhb

Programming
- Affiliations: Fuji News Network and Fuji Network System

Ownership
- Owner: Hokkaido Cultural Broadcasting Co., Ltd.

History
- Founded: June 19, 1971
- First air date: April 1, 1972
- Former call signs: JOBM-TV (1972–2011)
- Former channel numbers: Analog: 27 (UHF, 1972–2011)

Technical information
- Licensing authority: MIC

Links
- Website: uhb.jp

Hokkaido Cultural Broadcasting Co., Ltd. (北海道文化放送株式会社, Hokkaidō Bunka Hōsō Kabushikigaisha; UHB) is a TV station affiliated with Fuji News Network (FNN) and Fuji Network System (FNS) serving in Hokkaido, Japan, headquartered in Sapporo, established in 1971.

Through its Hakodate translator, UHB functions as the default FNN/FNS affiliate for most of neighboring Aomori Prefecture to the south, as that area does not have an FNN/FNS affiliate of its own.

== History ==
In October 1969, the Ministry of Posts and Telecommunications (currently the Ministry of Internal Communications) approved the fourth TV license in Hokkaido, which attracted 59 companies to apply. At that time, both the Hokkaido Shimbun and Fuji Television were interested in obtaining television licenses. With the help of the prefectural government of Hokkaido, the 59 applicant companies were then integrated into Hokkaido Cultural Broadcasting centered on Hokkaido Shimbun and Fuji TV, and officially obtained a license in May 1971. The broadcaster was founded on June 19, 1971, and began trial broadcasts on January 14, 1972, prior to the 1972 Winter Olympics, the first of a kind in Asia.

The previous logo of UHB, used from 1 April 1972 until 1983.

At exactly 07:20am on April 1, 1972, UHB began broadcasting with "Today's Weather" being the first program to be broadcast. When it first commenced broadcasts, coverage area was just at 66% of households (initially at Sapporo, Hakodate, Asahikawa, and Muroran) and increased after half a year to 81.9% (expanding to Obihiro, Kushiro, and Abashiri). In 1981, Fuji TV assisted UHB in producing the TV drama series Kita no Kuni kara (aired between 1981 and 2002), which was an unprecedented success. It achieved more than 20% in ratings, and also promoted tourism in the Furano area, where the drama is produced. In 1991, UHB becomes responsible for FNN's Moscow bureau. On October 1, 1983, UHB introduced its current logo featuring lowercase letters. They also started using an electronic news gathering (ENG) in 1982 and stereo sound and bilingual broadcasting in 1984 Digital terrestrial broadcasts commence in Sapporo on June 1, 2006, and ceased analog broadcasts on July 24, 2011.
