= Flavorful Origins =

Chinese television documentary miniseries

- Genre: Documentary
- Country of origin: China
- Original language: Mandarin
- No. of seasons: 5
- No. of episodes: 60

Production
- Running time: 11-13 min.

Original release
- Network: Tencent Video
- Release: February 5, 2019 – present

Flavorful Origins (风味原产地) is a Chinese television documentary series, exploring culinary secrets of China and the various cooking techniques and cuisines with native Asian ingredients from the Chaoshan (season 1, 2019), Yunnan (season 2, 2019), Gansu (season 3, 2020), Guiyang (season 4, 2021) regions. Season 4 of Flavorful Origins premiered on 22 June 2021 in China.

== Netflix release ==
Season 1 was released on February 11, 2019, on Netflix streaming. Season 2 of Flavorful Origins was released on Netflix on October 30, 2019. Season 3 was released on November 20, 2020.

== Episodes ==
Season	Episodes	Originally released
1	20	February 11, 2019
2	10	October 30, 2019
3	10	November 20, 2020
4	10	June 22, 2021
5	10	November 22, 2023

=== Season 1 - Chaoshan Cuisine 潮汕 (2019) ===
No. overall	No. in season	Title
1	1	"Olives / 橄榄"
2	2	"Hu Tieu / 粿条"
3	3	"Marinated Crab / 腌蟹"
4	4	"Brine / 卤水"
5	5	"Puning Bean Paste / 普宁豆酱"
6	6	"Preserved Radish / 菜脯"
7	7	"Seaweed / 紫菜"
8	8	"Oysters / 生蚝"
9	9	"Chaozhou Mandarin Oranges / 潮柑"
10	10	"Lei Cha / 擂茶"
11	11	"Tofu Cake / 腐乳饼"
12	12	"Beef Hot Pot / 牛肉火锅"
13	13	"Beef Meatballs / 牛肉丸"
14	14	"Yusheng / 鱼生"
15	15	"Meal of Fish / 鱼饭"
16	16	"Fish Sauce / 鱼露"
17	17	"Fish Ball and Wrapped Fish / 鱼丸"
18	18	"Mussels / 薄壳"
19	19	"Galangal / 南姜"
20	20	"Chinese Motherwort / 益母草"

=== Season 2 - Yunnan Cuisine 云南 (2019) ===
No. overall	No. in season	Title
21	1	"Dairy Products / 乳制品"
22	2	"Nan Piě / 喃撇"
23	3	"Sa Piě / 撒"
24	4	"Lacquer Seed Oil / 漆油"
25	5	"Ham / 火腿"
26	6	"Pickled Vegetables / 腌菜"
27	7	"Hardy Banana / 芭蕉"
28	8	"Sour Fruits / 酸水果"
29	9	"Rice Cake / 饵"
30	10	"Salted Flour / 鲊"

=== Season 3 - Gansu Cuisine 甘肃 (2020) ===
No. overall	No. in season	Title
31	1	"Mutton / 羊肉"
32	2	"Lily / 百合"
33	3	"Cooked chopped entrails of sheep / 羊杂"
34	4	"Flaxseed / 胡麻"
35	5	"Gua Gua / 呱呱"
36	6	"Beef noodles / 牛肉面"
37	7	"Gluten / 面筋"
38	8	"Souherb / 浆水"
39	9	"Niang Pi / 酿皮"
40	10	"Potato / 土豆"

=== Season 4 - Guiyang Cuisine 贵阳 (2021) ===
No. overall	No. in season	Title
41	1	"Tofu in Sour Soup / 酸汤豆腐"
42	2	"Chawang Noodles / 肠旺面"
43	3	"Sour Rice Noodles / 酸粉"
44	4	"Barbecue / 烧烤"
45	5	"Pork Crackling / 哨"
46	6	"Guiyang Spring Rolls / 丝娃娃"
47	7	"Spicy and Sour Sauce / 蘸水"
48	8	"Yellow Rice Cake / 黄粑"
49	9	"Freestyle / 怪噜"
50	10	"Pickled Vegetable / 酸菜"

=== Season 5 - Hubei Cuisine 湖北 (2023) ===
No. overall	No. in season	Title
51	1	"Wuhan Bean Curd / 武汉豆皮"
52	2	"Xiangyang Beef Noodles / 襄阳牛肉面"
53	3	"Honghu Lotus Root / 洪湖莲藕"
54	4	"Xiangyang Pig's Trotters / 襄阳缠蹄"
55	5	"Huangmei Fish Noodles / 黄梅鱼面"
56	6	"Soybean Product and Vegetable Stew / 恩施合渣"
57	7	"Xiaogan Rice Wine / 孝感米酒"
58	8	"Xiantao Steamed Vegetables / 仙桃蒸菜"
59	9	"Fangxian Fungus / 房县木耳"
60	10	"Jingzhou Fish Dishes / 荊州鱼馔"
