= Kaojijia =

- A plate of kaojijia seasoned with cumin and spring onion
- Alternative names: Grilled chicken frame
- Type: Shaokao
- Place of origin: Shenyang, China
- Associated cuisine: Northeastern Chinese cuisine

Kaojijia (Chinese: 烤鸡架, literally "roasted chicken frame") is a type of Chinese barbecue (烧烤, shaokao) dish made from chicken carcasses, with its origin believed to be from Shenyang, Northeast China. Chicken frames are inexpensive cuts consisting primarily of the bones and remaining meat after the breast, thighs, and other larger portions have been removed. In Shenyang, they are prepared in numerous ways, including roasting, grilling, frying, smoking, and stewing.

Chicken frames have been consumed in Shenyang since at least the 1950s but became more widespread during the 1990s. Their expansion has been widely attributed to the restructuring of the city's state-owned industrial sector, when laid-off industrial workers entered small-scale food businesses and developed new methods of preparing the inexpensive ingredient. Chicken frame dishes have since then become representative of Shenyang's local food culture.

== History ==
=== Origin ===
Chicken frames were said to be first commercialized as a food in Shenyang during the early 1950s. Geographically connected to the Korean Peninsula, Shenyang and other parts of Northeast China served as important logistical bases for China's frontline troops during the Korean War. For that reason, one of the nation's earliest state-owned poultry slaughterhouses was established near Nanta Guangci Temple (南塔广慈寺) in 1950 to supply chicken meat to the People's Liberation Army Air Force pilots and ground crews stationed near the city.

After the breast and leg meat had been removed, the remaining chicken frames were served. As the number of pilots increased, the government of Wusan Township decided to open the Nanta Qinxiang Restaurant (南塔禽香饭店), the first ever in Shenyang that served chicken frames. The inexpensive dish quickly gained popularity and attracted swarms of customers, so much so that the chicken frames became short in supply.

=== Popularization during the 1980s ===
Kaojijia and Chenmian at Lao Si Ji

By the 1980s, Laosiji Chenmian (老四季抻面) used broth made from chicken frames as the soup base for its noodles. The pairing of chicken-frame broth noodles and the signature Snow beer (雪花啤酒) subsequently became regarded as a characteristic meal of Shenyang.

=== Expansion during SOE restructuring ===
During the 1990s, chicken-frame street food greatly expanded amid the restructuring of Shenyang's state-owned enterprises and the large-scale layoffs known as Xiagang (下岗). Some industrial workers who lost their previous employment entered small-scale food business, using skills acquired in factories to construct cooking equipment. Contemporary accounts credit these workers with helping popularize new preparations including iron-plate (铁板), roasted (烤) and smoked (熏) chicken frames. The affordability of chicken frames made them accessible both as an ingredient for small-scale vendors and as comfort food for households experiencing decling incomes.

== Ingredients and preparation ==
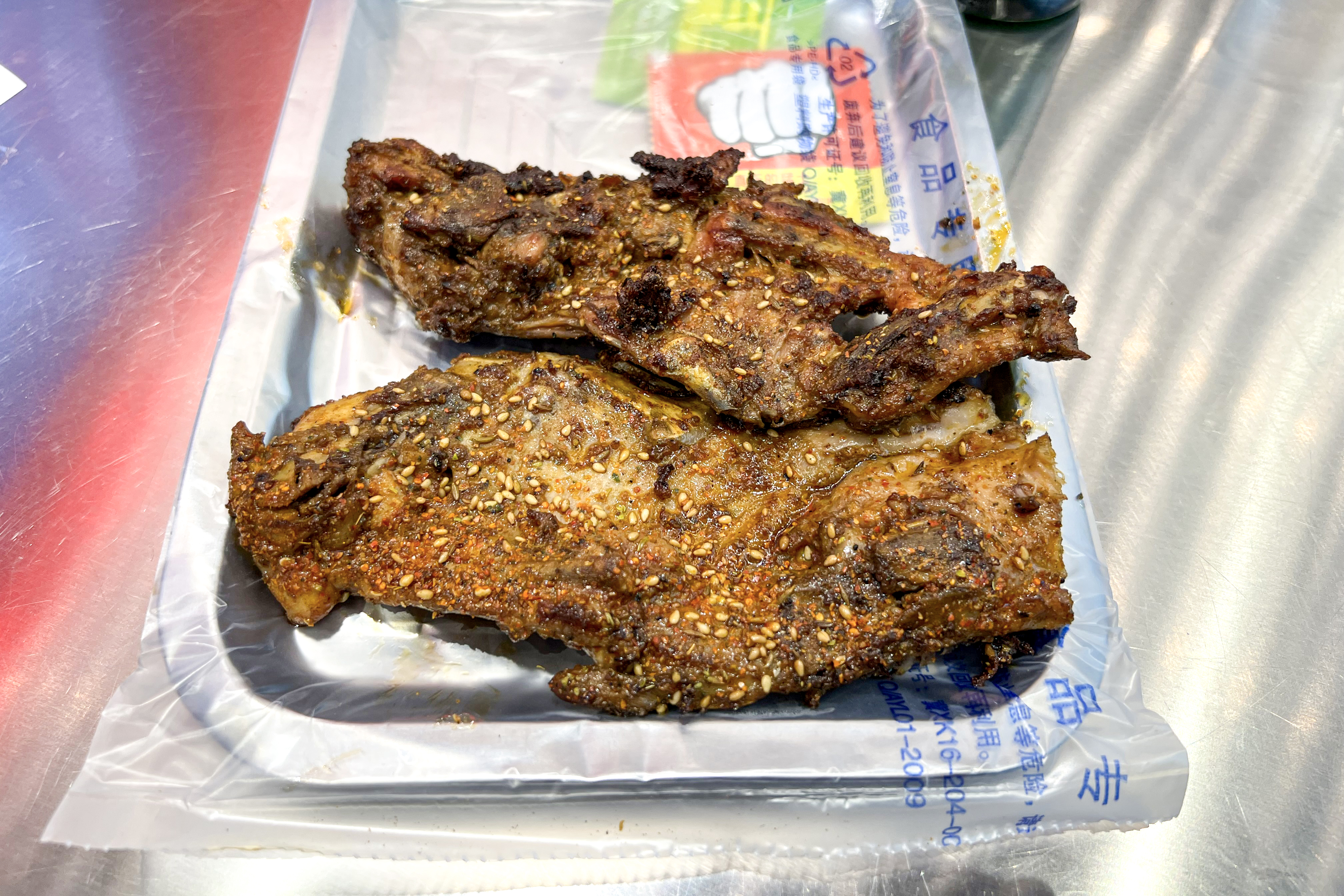

Chicken frames consist of the carcass remaining after larger trims of meat, particularly the breast and legs, have been removed. Despite containing relatively little meat, small amounts remain attached around the bones and cartilage. In Shenyang, chicken frames are prepared using a variety of methods, including roasting or grilling (kǎo, 烤), smoking (xūn, 熏), frying (zhá, 炸), cooking on an iron plate (tiě bǎn, 铁板), boiling or simmering, and tossing with seasonings (bàn, 拌).

For roasted chicken frames, the frames are typically marinated or seasoned before being grilled over charcoal or roasted in an oven. Common seasonings include cumin, Sichuan pepper and five-spice powder, although recipes vary among vendors. During cooking, the frames may be turned and repeatedly brushed with seasoning or marinade.
