= Xiagang =

1995 term for Chinese labour reforms

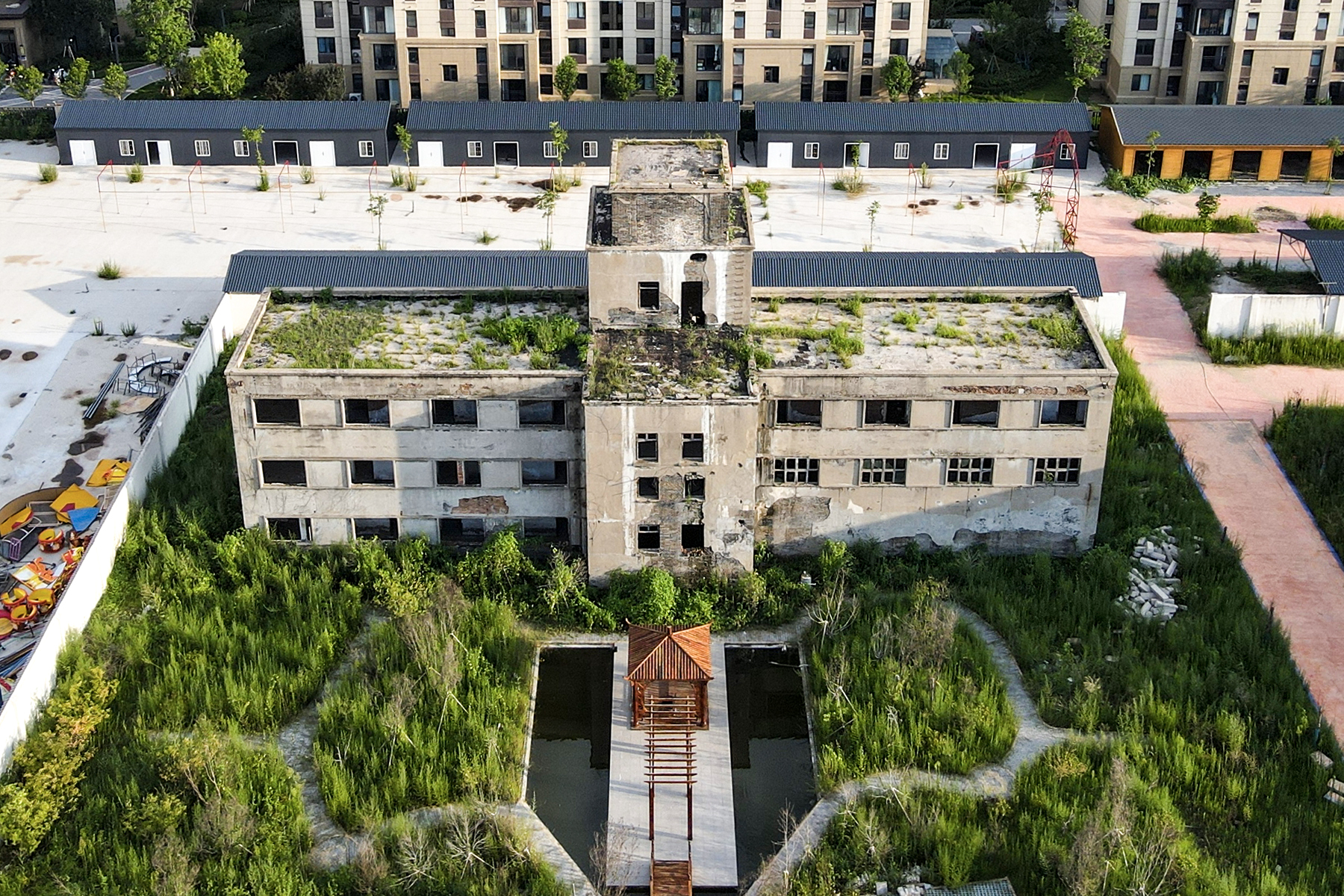
- Former site of Minquan County Winery, the nation's first state-owned winery. It went bankrupt in 2005 due to severe losses and subsequent layoffs.
- Simplified Chinese: 下岗
- Traditional Chinese: 下崗
Transcriptions
Standard Mandarin
- Hanyu Pinyin: Xiàgǎng

Xiagang (Chinese: 下岗; lit. 'step down from the post') was a form of layoff associated with the restructuring of state-owned enterprises (SOE) in China, particularly during the late 1990s and early 2000s when the country was experiencing intense economic transition from command economy to a market-oriented economy characterized by radical privatization and marketization. Unlike conventional unemployment, xiagang workers remain de jure employed by their former danweis (单位: work units) despite no longer working, generally receiving reduced wages or minimal benefits while seeking new employment. The term was officially adopted by the government of China in the 1990s and initially applied primarily to workers from merged, bankrupted or downsized SOEs; its usage subsequently broadened to also encompass workers awaiting reassignment or experiencing suspended or reduced wages.

Large-scale xiagang accompanied the acceleration of SOE restructuring during the premiership of Zhu Rongji, as China sought to curb losses and surplus employment in the state sector and develop a more robust private sector. More than a quarter of China's SOE workforce was laid off within several years, with over 24.4 million workers recorded as xiagang by the end of 1999. Layoffs were unevenly distributed, with older industrial regions, particularly the once-prosperous Northeast and North China, among the areas most heavily affected.

Xiagang represented a major transformation of China's employment and welfare system. Studies have associated the sudden increase of unemployed and underemployed labor force in the wake of xiagang with widening economic inequality between the Southern coastal provinces and the inland provinces, out-migration of skilled workers from declining industrial areas to the more economically developed first- and second-tier cities, and the expansion of informal employment, including unregulated street vendings. In heavily affected communities, xiagang was also widely attributed as being the major cause for poverty, homelessness, crime, mass incidents and other forms of social unrest. These developments placed additional pressure on local governments, including rising expenditure on stability maintenance by public security and urban management. Xiagang therefore had lasting economic and social consequences for affected workers and industrial communities, and became an important subject of labor activism, scholarship, and cultural representations of Chinese society since its economic reforms.

== History ==
=== Origin ===
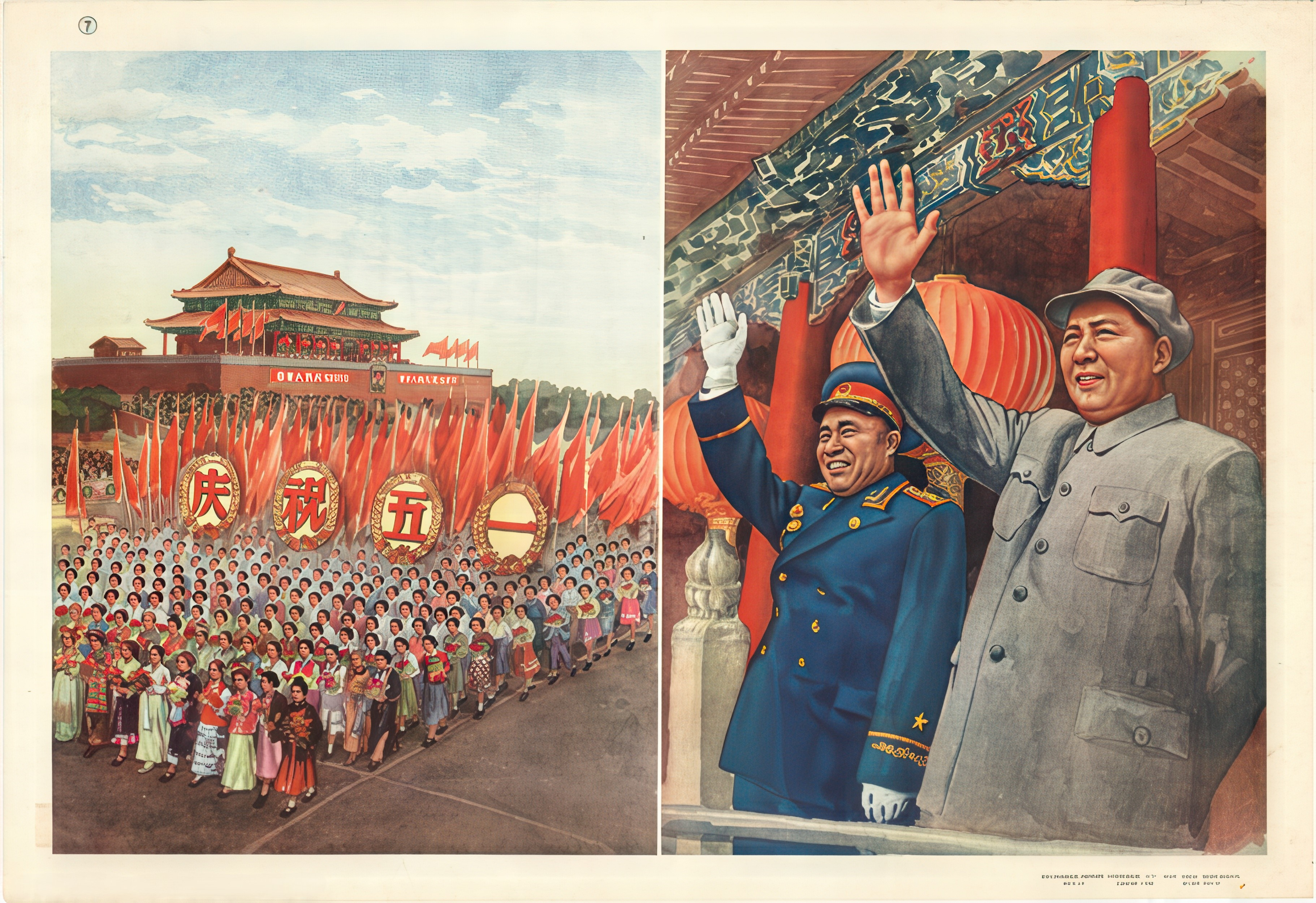
Maoist-era propaganda depicting the celebration of International Workers' Day in Tiananmen Square.

Upon establishing the People's Republic of China in 1949, the ruling Chinese Communist Party (CCP) transitioned the country towards a planned economy where essentially all economic activities were placed under state control, and private sector was officially non-existent. Under this economic system, SOEs were intended to be not merely an organization for production but work units tasked with providing lifetime employment to urban populations, while guaranteeing most of basic necessities its members needed from cradle to grave. This Maoist mode of egalitarianism, combined with the traditional Chinese belief in collectivism, was therefore colloquially coined as the "Iron Rice Bowl" (铁饭碗), in which staff and workers employed in such enterprises not only enjoyed better pay and social status, but also feelings of genuine pride in their working-class identity.

Workers at the Beijing No. 3 Cotton Textile Mill, 1965

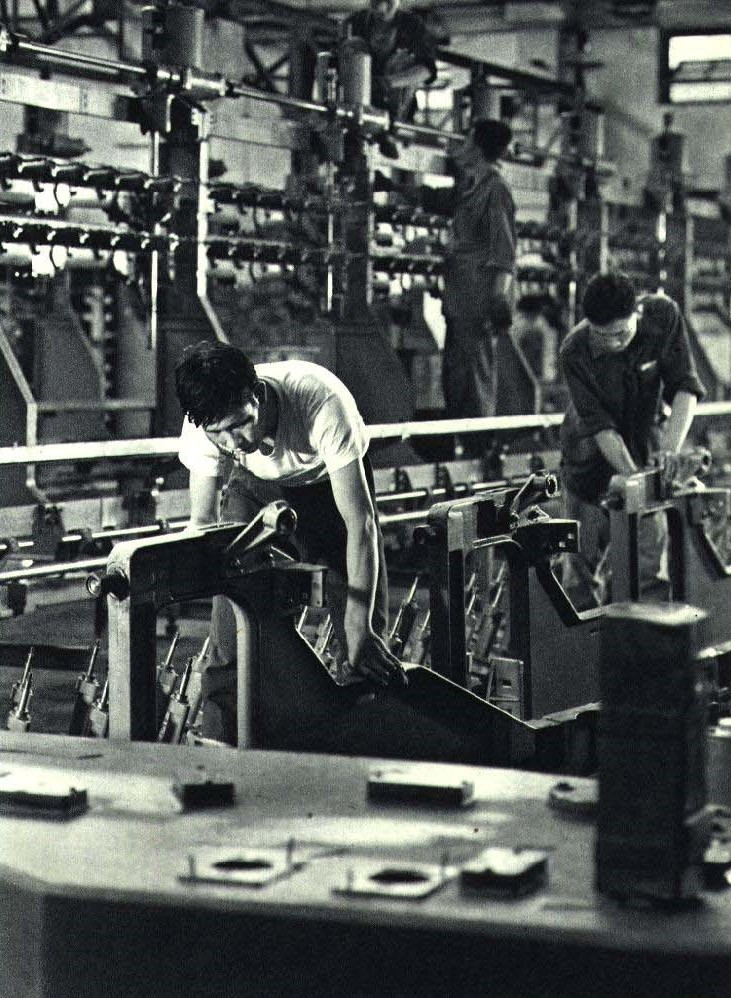
Workers producing viscose filament machine in Jingwei Textile Machinery Factory, 1965

Shanghai Pujiang Machine Tool Factory, 1967

Female textile workers walking through the factory, Shanghai, 1953

Bus providing commuting service for female workers caring for infants, Shenyang, Liaoning, 1959

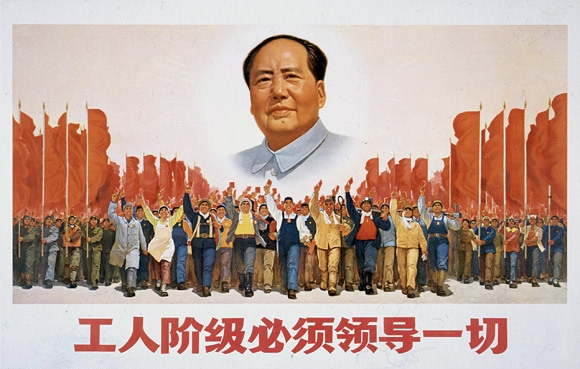
1969 slogan "The Working-Class Must Exercise Leadership in Everything"

However, the state's commitment to providing complete social care was materialized largely at the cost of economic efficiency. By treating overstaffing as an obligation, China has managed to provide jobs to an enormous labor force about 29% of the world labor supply, and almost twice as large as the total work forces from all developing countries. Also, with all production ordered by the government, the operation of these enterprises were detached from and irresponsive to the actual demands of the consumers. Whether in state-owned or, among the very few exceptions, private enterprises, workers were not allowed to be dismissed, and there were no corresponding mechanism for bankruptcy. Some severely loss-making enterprises ended up becoming non-performing assets of the state. Enterprises lacking competition and operating without profit or loss had no incentive to develop new technologies or expand production.

The consequence was endemic stagnation, low wages, and scarcity, in which lack of motivation to improve or expand production meant that most commodities had to be placed under a rigid rationing system. From 1950 to 1973, China's GDP per capita grew at a rate of 2.9% per year on average, placing it far below the rate of growth achieved by neighboring countries and regions such as Japan, South Korea, Singapore and Taiwan ruled by the rivaling Republic of China (ROC) during the same period.

=== Start of Reform ===
After the death of Mao Zedong, in order to salvage the nation's stagnant economy, the CCP leadership centered around Deng Xiaoping decided in 1979 to initiate an intense period of economic liberalisation under the policies of reform and opening up.

In October 1984, the Third Plenary Session of the 12th Central Committee of the Chinese Communist Party issued the Decision on Economic System Reform (关于经济体制改革的决定), marking the beginning of urban labor reform that went in full effect in 1985. The Decision expanded the autonomy of enterprises, recalled state-appointed cadres from private enterprises, and vigorously promoted market-based employment systems to increase labour productivity and cost effectiveness within SOEs. They drew stark attention to what they framed as the inefficiencies of overstaffed workers (富余职工), who made up 10% of the SOE labour force.

Initially, beginning in 1982, most workers were reassigned to other units within their enterprise through labour consolidation reforms before further changes implemented a bidding system to fill positions between 1987 and 1992. These inevitably only increased the number of surplus workers.

==== Critical years since 1989 ====
The crisis years of the late-1980s marked a turning point in China's economic reforms. Knowing that mass unemployment would undermine the relationship between the socialist state and the working class, labour reform during most of the 1980s had largely been a "reform without losers," wherein the Chinese state followed a cautious, dual-track approach that preserved existing state-sector and avoided imposing substantial losses on workers.

Following the political upheaval of 1989 and the subsequent collapse of the Soviet Union and the wider Eastern bloc, Chinese policymakers closely studied the experiences of other socialist states while seeking to continue economic reform without accompanying political liberalisation, and reforms thus resumed in 1992 under a substantially different framework. The reform programme introduced in 1993-1994 prioritised recentralisation, changes in enterprise ownership and stronger state regulation. This transition combined further marketisation with the consolidation of state and CCP authority, creating political environment of state-owned enterprises fundamentally different from the preceding decade.

By the 1990s, SOEs increasingly failed to generate sufficient revenue, and by the middle of the decade, as many as 63% of all SOEs were either operating at a deficit or incurring losses, a situation that was further worsened by the Asian financial crisis in the upcoming year. The state therefore began distancing itself from the hiring and firing process, and instead diverting its attention to cutting job-training programmes, hiring agencies, and unemployment insurance.

=== Unfolding of layoffs ===
Backed by the government's popular rhetoric and its retreat from staffing decisions, employers began mass layoffs, insisting they were necessary to boost productivity. As a result, public perception of Xiagang changed from something driven by government policy to a consequence of market pressures that left employers with little choice.

From 1993, millions of employees were subsequently laid off each year. Between the height of the Xiagang in mid-1990s to early 2000s, the total number of layoffs ranged from 27 to 35 million. By 1998, 67.84% of SOE employees were retrenched; by 1999, 13.2% of the urban labour force had been fired. The layoffs, combined with unemployment numbers, resulted in the urban unemployment rate reaching an average of 10.9% between 2002 and 2009, more than double official state reports.

Deceptive and coercive measures were deployed by many enterprises in order to carry out layoffs, such as China National Petroleum Corporation (CNPC) and Sinopec, which had laid off approximately 700,000 workers. On the other hand, there were also enterprises like the Daqing Oilfield that ruled out layoffs due to strong reprisals from the workers. After many workers lost their jobs, their former enterprises were sold off at low prices to the factory directors and party secretaries of the enterprises thereof, and workers had to continue working for the new managers for wages far lower than they had before. Not all SOE workers were at high risk of retrenchment. Men, the higher educated, CCP members and those in higher-skill jobs were less likely to be fired. Conversely, women and individuals in poor health faced greater risk of layoffs.

It is important to differentiate between Xiagang layoffs and unemployment (失业). While the latter denotes unemployed people entitled to government support, the former refers only to the urban SOE workers who became unemployed or semi-unemployed in the 1990s who received minimal benefits: one-third from the state and two-thirds from their previous employers. This differentiation served various purposes. It lessened the burden on the welfare system and government purse, softened the connotations and impact of layoffs, concealed the real unemployment numbers, and divided the working class, preventing unified action between the unemployed.

== Responses ==
=== Civil response ===
In response to the mass Xiagang layoffs, many took to the streets to protest. Although there are no accurate counts of their numbers, it is estimated that thousands of demonstrations occurred, attended by millions of retrenched workers. Protests were characterised by their brevity, limited turnout, and poor communication and coordination between groups from different enterprises. Although protests were individually affected by both regional politics and economic factors, protest regulations from the central government shaped all of their demands and behaviours. Instead of directly opposing the government's market and employment reforms when they were denied the contractual, unemployment, or pension benefits they were entitled to, demonstrators petitioned the state to interfere on their behalf. Instead of voicing anger or political grievances, protesters largely expressed hunger, despair, and desires to meet basic needs. Moreover, protesters utilised their "nuisance value" to demonstrate their strength while never denouncing their allegiance with the state, consciously acting within the complainant boundaries designed by the state.

Consequently, the government was pressured to respond to protests with tolerance and openness to avoid appearing repressive towards the working class and risking solidarity between protest groups. The state thus deemed the demonstrations unthreatening, ensuring the continued legality of the protests and granting their organisers the opportunity for negotiation. As a result, demonstrations occasionally won a number of small concessions that improved their everyday lives. However, no real institutional change developed.

=== Policy response ===
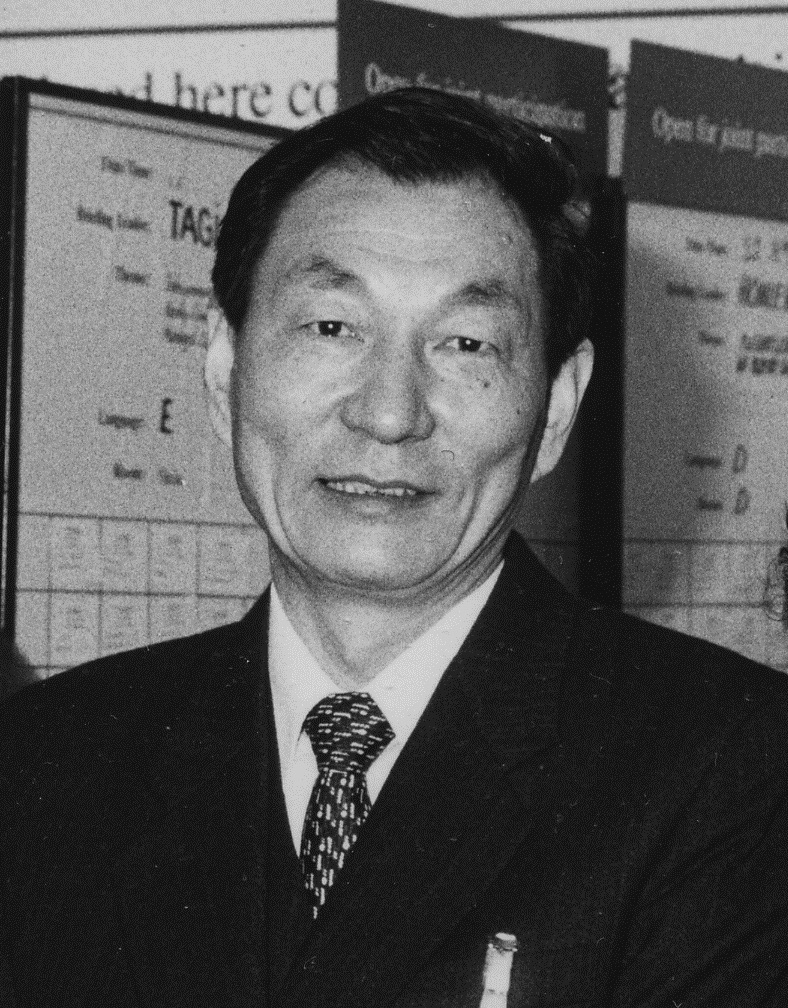
Zhu Rongji, then the Premier of China, was the chief architect of Xiagang-related policies

The Chinese government addressed the impacts of Xiagang through two major policies. From 1993 to 1997, layoffs were relatively rare and temporary. Individual enterprises and local governments were held responsible for supporting workers, and informal remedies were encouraged—including ad hoc benefits and temporarily relocating workers to other jobs. This was part of a market approach that pushed propaganda encouraging workers to seek new jobs in the non-state sector, which was allegedly expanding rapidly in the early 1990s; this claim has since been challenged.

==== Implementation ====
The statist approach consisted mostly of Re-employment Service Centres (RSCs) to process laid off workers, which individual companies were required to build in 1998. RSCs provided living allowances, social security, job training, and health insurance, assuming many of the responsibilities previously funded by the state. These centres became central to developing Chinese social security infrastructure, providing a means for SOEs to offload surplus workers and increase efficiency, while ensuring that the retrenched were cared for. However, by 2000, the central government viewed RSCs as a failure, due to uneven participation, lack of funding within firms, and abuses of the system by workers and officials. Ultimately, the RSCs were closed and Xiagang workers were transferred directly into the open labour market without benefits or transitional support.

The coverage and associated benefits of the statist approach have varied significantly, due largely to uneven implementation of different regions as well as the financial resources of local governments and SOEs. In economically developed cities like Shanghai, some Xiagang workers report having received effective assistance to ease their transition into new employment, whereas in financially struggling provinces and cities like Shanxi, Wuhan, and Chongqing, workers frequently expressed that government intervention had "come to nothing."

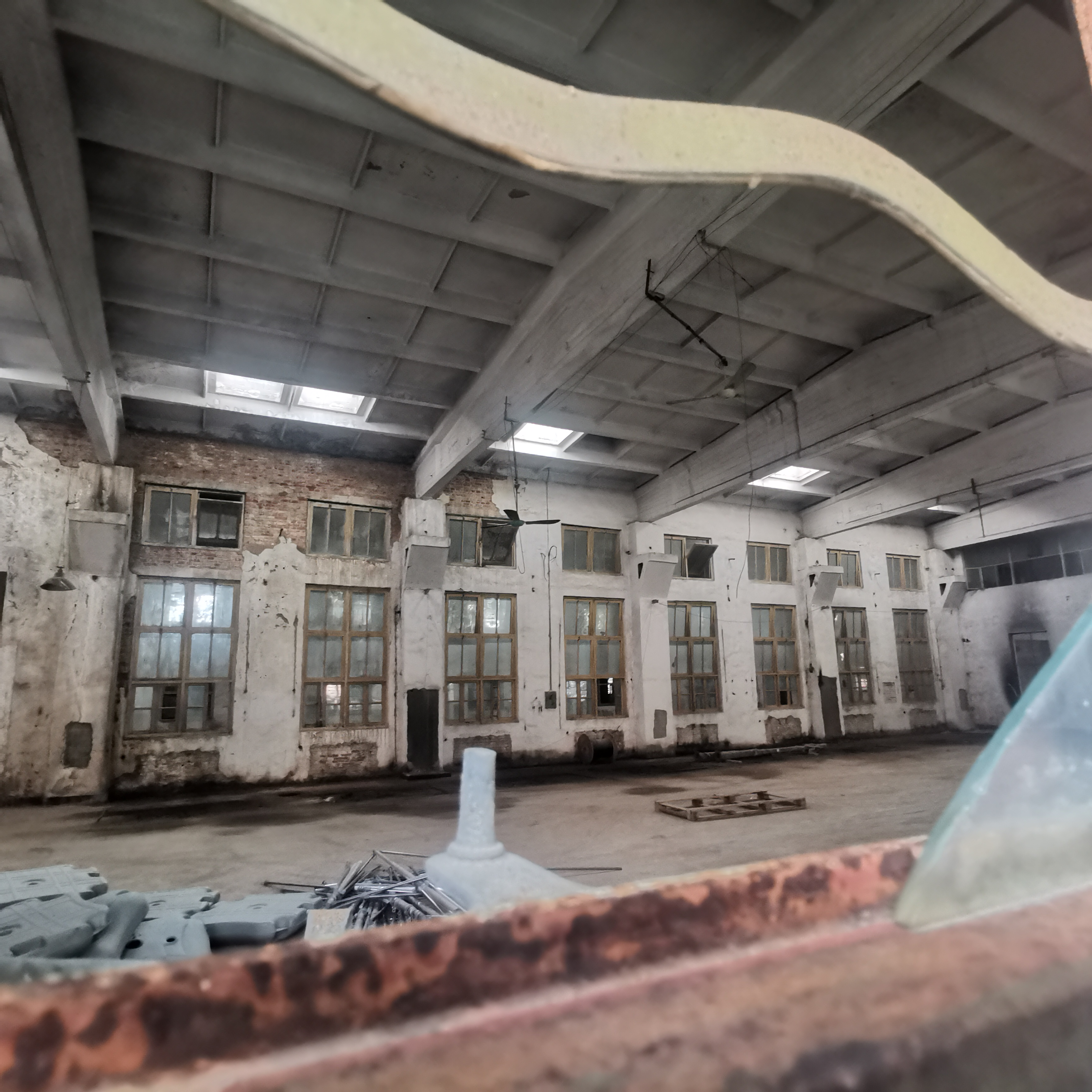
An abandoned factory floor in Tianshui, an important Third Front industrial city in the east of Gansu province

Layoffs were disproportionately implemented in specific industries and regions. Eight provinces—from the traditional industrial heartland like Liaoning, Heilongjiang, and Jilin in the Northeast, to the inland industrial bases developed during the Third Front Movement (三线建设) like Hunan, Hubei, Sichuan, Henan, and Shaanxi in the Northwest, Southwest, and Central China—accounted for 56% of all laid-off workers in the country. Since the economy of these provinces relied heavily on declining "sunset industries" including textiles, arms manufacturing, heavy machinery, and chemical engineering reliant on outdated production facilities, they were particularly vulnerable to large-scale restructuring and the subsequent issues of excess labor. By contrast, those provinces along the eastern coastline of China such as Zhejiang, Fujian, and Guangdong, where the rapidly expanding private sectors were more closely integrated into global markets, were comparatively much less affected by the shocks wrought about by Xiagang.

== Legacies ==
=== Social legacy ===
As one of the most drastic episodes in China's transition towards a market economy, the layoffs that occurred during Xiagang have left a lasting imprint on Chinese society, causing widespread disruptions to individual lives. Trade unions were ineffective in countering the new local managers tasked with implementing the state's Xiagang policies at their own discretion. Largely unsupervised, corruption was rampant among local authorities. According to the Chinese Federation of Labor Unions survey, only 5% of the laid off workers received the full amount of financial support they were entitled to, and a 1997 Survey of the Status of Chinese Staff and Workers further reveals that only half of the laid off workers received any monthly financial assistance.

The former Shenyang Foundry, now a part of the Chinese Industry Museum

Although the RSCs were obliged to assist the Xiagang workers' search for new work, a majority of those retrenched were older than 35 and had less than nine years of formal education, limiting their re-employment prospects. Job opportunities for retrenched workers were further restricted by the influx of rural migrants into cities seeking higher wages. Desperation for re-employment forced both the largely urban Xiagang workers and rural migrants to compete over jobs that are menial, poorly paid, and precarious. A survey of 54,000 retrenched workers showed that only 18% found new employment; meaning most were forced to endure a substantial loss of social status. An anonymous laid off worker said:

"Our generation got a socialist education. We were taught that it was our duty to serve our country and our people. No matter what kind of work we did we were all serving the people. There was no such idea as high or low [status]. But suddenly this seems to be all wrong. How come I suddenly fell from the superior working class to become someone's slave? I can't make sense of this. I can no longer tell which side is wrong, me or the society."

Xiagang workers, once seen as "the vanguard of China's workforce", were eventually redefined as a "new crowd of the dispossessed."Laid off and limited in future job prospects, workers' social status rapidly declined and they felt their social contract with the Socialist government had been violated. This sparked widespread working class anger which challenged the legitimacy of the CCP.

=== Economic legacy ===
The economic consequences of Xiagang have reshaped modern Chinese society. As Xiagang workers were unlikely to resume gainful employment, the majority were only able to find temporary or hourly positions. By 2011, those who were retrenched between 1998 and 2000 are estimated to have individually lost 17,000 RMB ($2,368), while those laid off between 2001 and 2004 saw an even greater 18,800 RMB ($2,909) loss. As a result, the percentage of urban citizens living on a wage below the national average increased to 21% in 2013, up by 8% in 1995.

While market reforms caused great suffering among millions of former SOE workers, they also benefitted the Chinese economy by contributing to the rapid expansion of the private sector. Despite these disruptions, large-scale social unrest was largely avoided, as many laid-off workers gradually adjusted their expectations and came to accept unemployment as a consequence of market reforms. In Beijing, approximately 80% of reemployed workers found jobs in the tertiary sector, while in Guangzhou, around 40% entered the private sector. More broadly, the decline of employment in state-owned and collective enterprises was in parallel with the rising capacity of the non-public sector, which has absorbed 24.15 million more workers in the period from 1978 to 1998.

These transformations, alongside other factors, facilitated China's entry into the World Trade Organisation (WTO). Afterwards, China began to attract foreign investment from corporations looking to capitalise on the country's cheap labour force, and the country's economy took off as total exports jumped from $266 billion in 2002 to $2.2 trillion in 2013. SOEs also benefitted greatly from Xiagang policies, as their newfound ability to fire inefficient employees, combined with the fear that they would be outperformed by rival corporations, produced a more competitive environment. This significantly improved Total Factor Productivity across the Chinese industrial sector. Since China entered the WTO, urban unemployment has fallen to an average of 4–4.3% as of October 2025, a decline from 11.1% in September 2002, and only a slight increase from 3.9% during the 1988–1995 transition era. Essentially, Xiagang was a necessary step for the development of the Chinese economic miracle.

=== Political legacy ===
Though many Xiagang protests were apolitical, their claims did pose a direct challenge to the Constitution of the Chinese Communist Party, which claims that the party is led by the working class. To deal with this criticism and maintain stability, the government utilised a mix of force and concessions, instructing local officials to avoid coercion when possible.

The organisers of unequivocally political protests against Xiagang policies were subject to selective arrests and detentions, such as Yao Fuxin in Liaoyang. Having failed to protect these protesters, the official, state-run All-China Federation of Trade Unions (ACFTU) was widely criticised by workers, both for lacking independence and for its ineffectiveness in defending workers's rights. Protesters have since perceived the ACFTU as a conduit of the Party's goals to preserve stability, failing to truly fulfill its duty to protect workers.

== In popular culture ==
=== Cinematography ===
The era of Xiagang has been a recurring subject in contemporary Chinese literature and cinema. Critically acclaimed films such as The Piano in a Factory (钢的琴, 2010), So Long, My Son (地久天长, 2019), and the television dramas of A Lifelong Journey (人世间, 2022) and The Long Season (漫长的季节, 2023) explore in depth the hope and despair experienced by working-class families in the aftermath of large-scale layoffs from SOEs. These cultural depictions reflect the profound psychological and social consequences of China's economic reforms in late-1990s.

=== Music ===
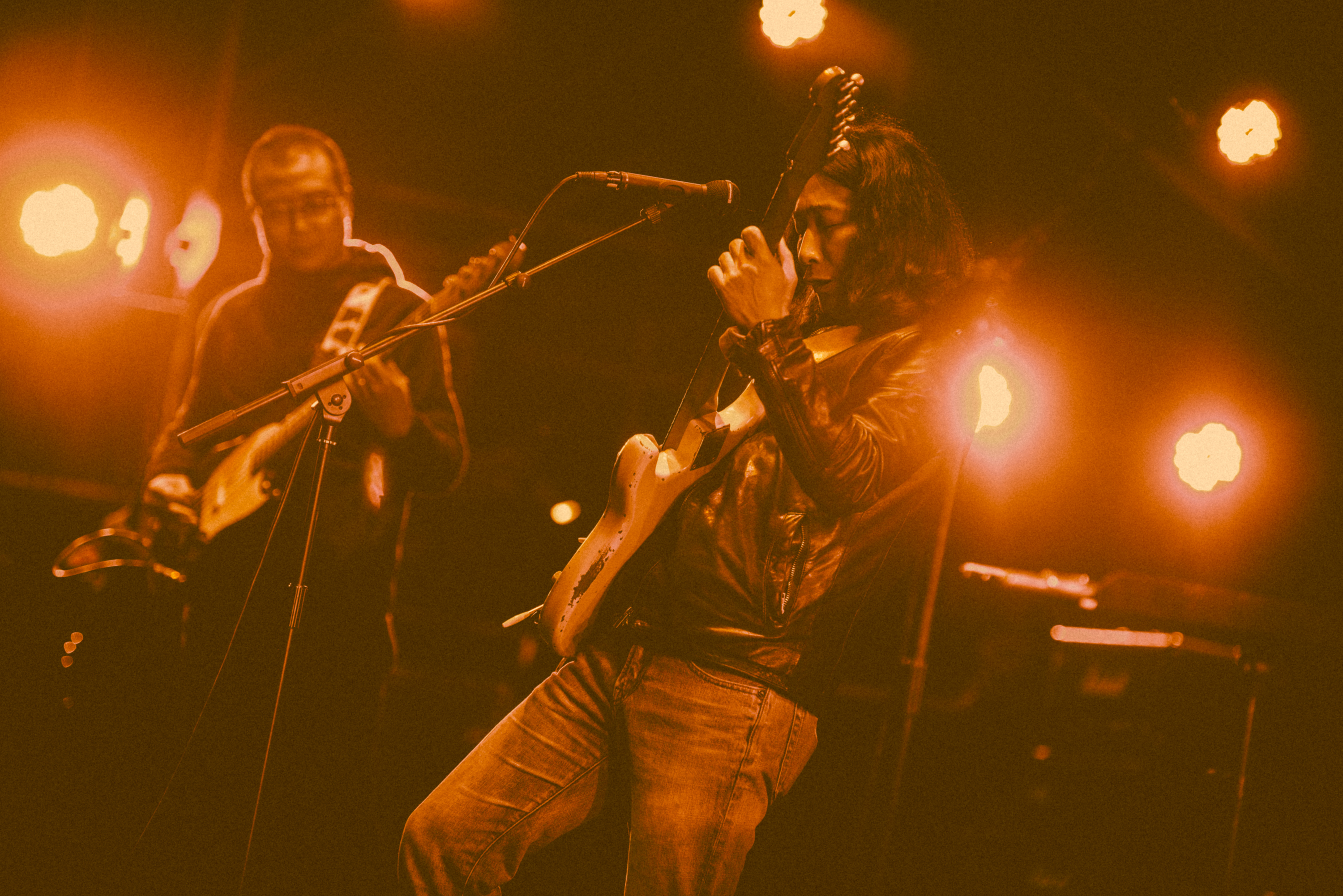
Omnipotent Youth Society, on the left is bassist Ji Geng (姬赓), and on the right is lead vocalist Dong Yaqian (董亚千).

Omnipotent Youth Society (万能青年旅店), the Chinese indie rock band formed in Shijiazhuang, a city whose once-prominent pharmaceutical and heavy industrial base was severely affected by state-owned enterprise reforms, has been widely interpreted as reflecting the social atmosphere of post-industrial Northern China following mass layoffs of the Xiagang period. Their lyrics frequently depict economic stagnation, unemployment, and the erosion of traditional working-class identities, all of which were common consequences of SOE restructuring in cities across the Northeast and North China Plain. Although the band does not reference Xiagang explicitly, critics have described their music as capturing the dislocation and disillusionment experienced by a generation during and after the layoffs.

=== Cuisine ===
After Xiagang, many unemployed workers in the Northeast entered the catering and retail industries because of their low threshold, low cost, fast capital recovery and flexible time schedule. They invented the now famous street foods (小吃: xiaochi) such as kaojijia (烤鸡架: grilled chicken frame) in Shenyang, Northeast-style shaokao inspired by Uyghur kawap from Xinjiang, and malatang (麻辣烫) recreated from the original Sichuan recipe.

== See also ==
- Danwei
- Iron Rice Bowl
- State-Owned Enterprises of China
- Reform and Opening Up
- Economic Inequality in China
- Corruption in China
