= Liaoning cuisine =

Northeastern Chinese cuisine

- Traditional Chinese: 遼寧菜
- Simplified Chinese: 辽宁菜
Transcriptions
Standard Mandarin
- Hanyu Pinyin: Liáoníng cài

Liaoning cuisine is derived from the native cooking styles of the Liaoning Province in China. It is the most famous Northeastern Chinese cuisine.

== Characteristic features ==
The main characteristics of Liaoning cuisine is that it is colorful, tastes are strong, food is soft, and one dish has many flavors/tastes, however, the sweet taste and the salty taste are very distinct.

Some dishes include pickled Chinese cabbage stir-fried with vermicelli, chicken and mushroom stew, lamb kebabs, "malatang" (literally, spicy and hot) soup, stewed chicken with mushrooms, stewed catfish with eggplant, stewed pork with beans, and sliced potatoes with chili.

Since the province shares a border with North Korea, there are dishes similar to Korean cuisine, as well as a large Korean population. The food of Dalian is famed for consuming jellyfish and sea cucumbers by being a coastal city.

== See also ==
- Northeastern Chinese cuisine
- Chinese cuisine
- Jilin cuisine
