= Jilin cuisine =

Regional cooking style of the Han Chinese

- Chinese: 吉林菜
Transcriptions
Standard Mandarin
- Hanyu Pinyin: Jílín cài

Jilin cuisine is the regional cooking style of the Han Chinese with heavy influence from native Manchu, Korean, and Mongolian minorities in the Jilin Province of Northeastern China.

== Characteristic features ==
Due to short growing seasons and prolonged winters, fermentation is the main method of preserving food. Suan cai is very prominent in Jilin cuisine. The cold winters have also led to the development of regional styles of hot pot such as Fucha Manchu Hot Pot. The colder climate of Northern China is generally unsuited to growing rice, making wheat, buckwheat, and sorghum the primary sources of starch. The abundance of starch has given rise to the staple steamed buns and noodles dishes of the region. Jilin cuisine is unique among Chinese cuisine in its extensive consumption of raw seafood and vegetables.

Jilin cuisine is primarily characterized by influences from the three largest minorities of the province:

- Manchu – boiled pork and blood sausages, cold vegetables
- Korean – fermented vegetables, cold noodles
- Mongolian – lamb dishes

The ethnic Han in Jilin cuisine draw influence from Beijing, Shandong, and even Western cuisine. The deep preference and influence of Shandong cuisine come from immigrants who left the province for Jilin during the Qing Dynasty.

Jilin cuisine shares similar dishes with neighboring Heilongjiang and Liaoning provinces being part of the Northeastern Chinese cuisine.

== Notable dishes ==
| English | Chinese | Pinyin | Picture | Notes |
|---|---|---|---|---|
| Cold noodles | 冷面 | lěng miàn | | Combination of Han and Korean styles made with sorghum noodles with either sweet/sour or salty flavors. |
| Steamed white fish | 清蒸白鱼 | qīngzhēng bái yú | | A specific white fish called bái yú from the Songhua River. |
| Ginseng chicken | 人参鸡 | rénshēn jī | | Small chicken stuffed with rice, ginseng, and red dates, boiled. |
| Fried vermicelli | 煎粉 | jiān fěn | | |
| Buckwheat noodles | 饸饹条 | hé le tiáo | | |
| Ula hot pot | 乌拉火锅 | wūlā huǒguō | | Ula means river, referring to the Songhua River. |
| Newly-butchered pig | 杀猪菜 | shā zhū cài | | A banquet where every part of the pig is made into a dish served on the Lunar New Year. |
| Double-cooked pork slices | 锅包肉 | guō bāo ròu | | Sweet and sour pork dish originally from Harbin. |
| Fork fire spoon | 筱筱火 | xiǎo xiǎo huǒ | | Buns made with a beef, green onions, fresh ginger, and sesame oil filing often stamped with a special iron or "fire fork" to leave the signature of the region. |

== See also ==
- Northeastern Chinese cuisine
- Chinese cuisine
- Korean cuisine
- Manchu cuisine
