= Chinese cooking techniques =

Methods and techniques used to prepare Chinese cuisine

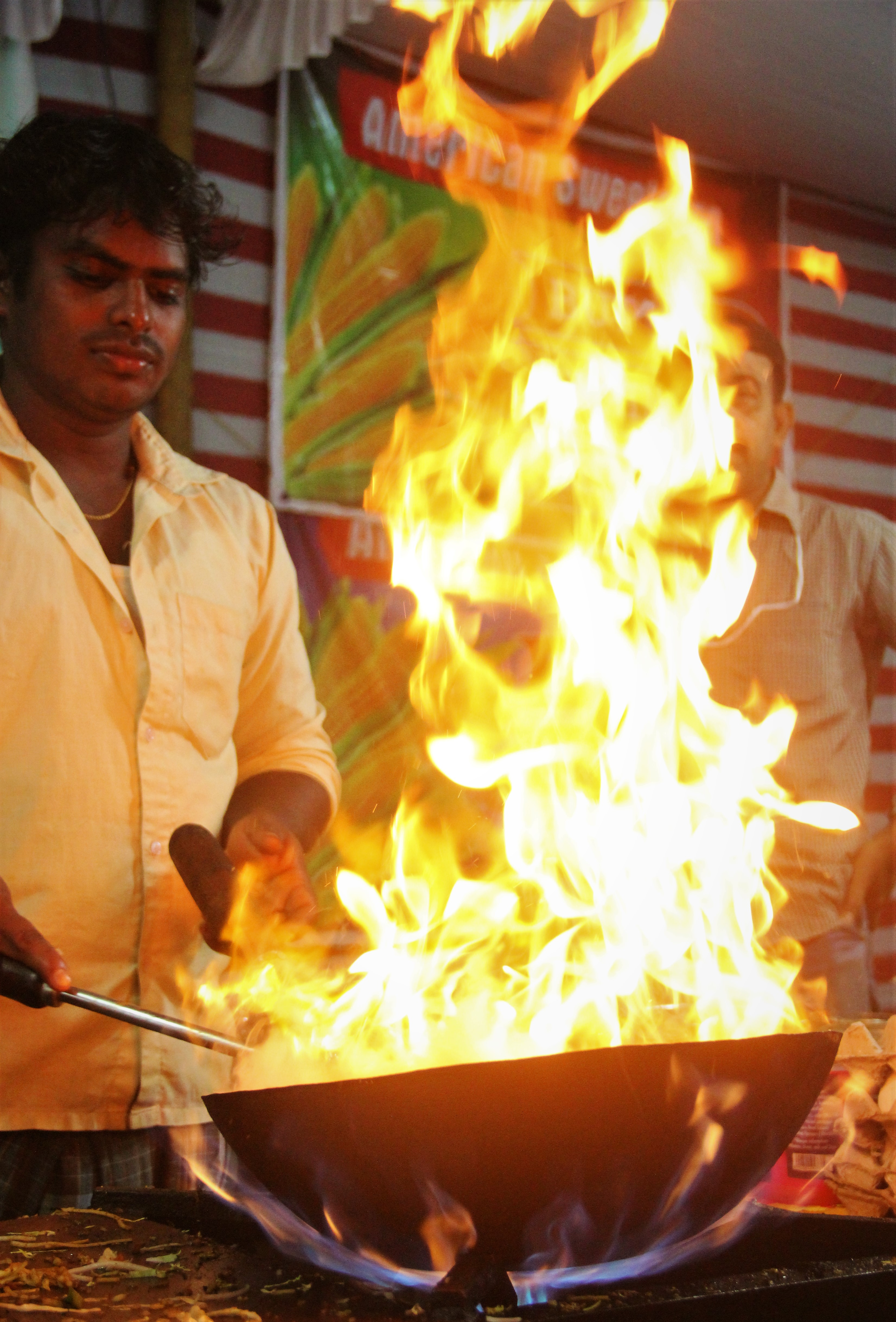
Chinese stir-frying cooking technique at a street food joint in Kerala, India

Chinese cooking techniques (Chinese: 中餐烹調法) are a set of methods and techniques traditionally used in Chinese cuisine. The cooking techniques can either be grouped into ones that use a single cooking method or a combination of wet and dry cooking methods.

== Single ==
Many cooking techniques involve a singular type of heated cooking or action.

=== Wet ===
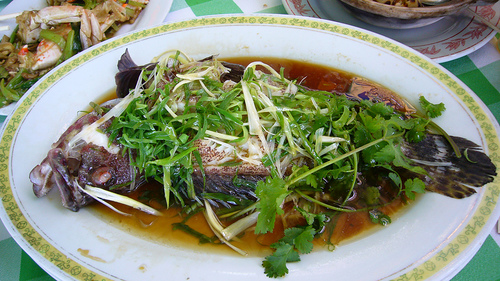
Steamed sea bass in the Cantonese style

Wet-heat, immersion-based cooking methods are the predominant class of cooking techniques in Chinese cuisine and are usually referred to as zhǔ (煮). In fact, this class of techniques is so common and important that the term zhǔ is commonly used to denote cooking in general.

=== Quick immersion ===
Quick wet-heat based immersion cooking methods include:

English equivalent	Chinese	Pinyin	Description
Braising	烧	Shāo	Braising ingredients over medium heat in a small amount of sauce or broth and simmering for a short period of time until completion. Known as hóngshāo (红燒, lit. red cooking) when the sauce or broth is soy sauce-based.
Quick boiling	汆 or 煠	Cuān or zhá	Adding ingredients and seasonings to boiling water or broth and immediately serving the dish with the cooking liquid when everything has come back to a boil.
Blanching	焯 or 烫	Chāo or tàng	Parcooking through quick immersion of raw ingredients in boiling water or broth, sometimes followed by immersion in cold water.

=== Prolonged immersion ===
Prolonged wet-heat based immersion cooking methods include:

English equivalent	Chinese	Pinyin	Description
Bake stewing	煨	Wēi	Slowly cooking a ceramic vessel of broth and other ingredients by placing it in or close to hot embers.
Steam stewing	焖	Mèn	Cooking with liquid (water or soup), covering in a tight-fitting lid until absorbed
Gradual simmering	炖	Dùn	Adding ingredients to cold water along with seasonings and allowing the contents to slowly come to a prolonged simmering boil. This is known in English as double steaming due to the vessels commonly used for this cooking method. The term is also used in Chinese for the Western cooking technique of stewing and brewing herbal remedies of traditional Chinese medicine.
Slow red cooking	卤	Lǔ	Cooking over prolonged and constant heat with the ingredients completely immersed in a strongly flavoured soy sauce-based broth. This technique is different from, but in English synonymous with, hóng shāo (红燒).
Decoction	熬	Áo	Cooking slowly to extract nutrients into the simmering liquid, used to describe the brewing process in Chinese herbology with the intention of using only the decocted brew.

=== Steaming ===
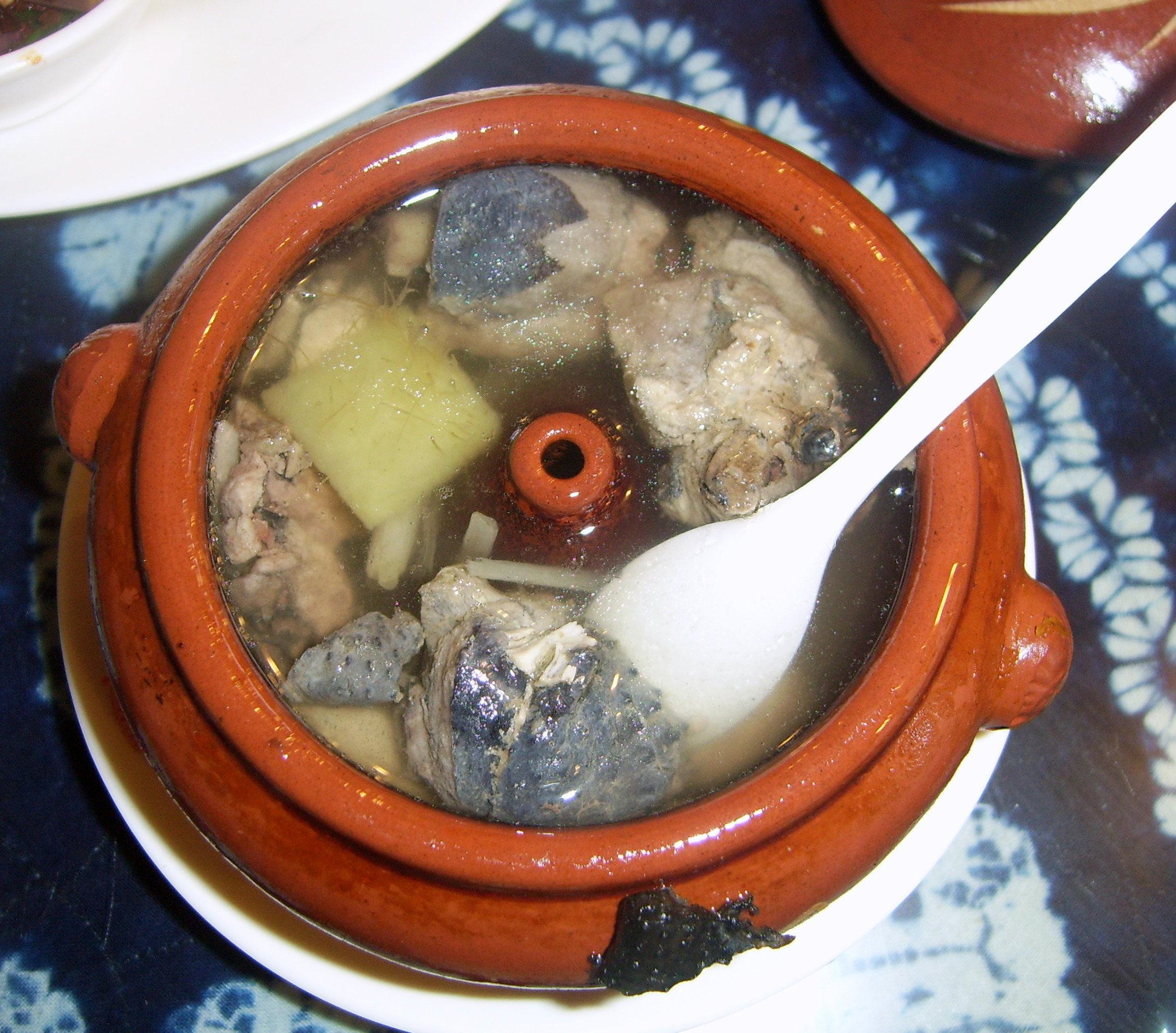
Silkie cooked by steaming using a specialized steam-pot

Steaming food is a wet cooking technique that has a long history in Chinese cuisine dating back to Neolithic times, where additional food was cooked by steaming over a vessel of food being cooked by other wet cooking techniques.

English equivalent	Chinese	Pinyin	Description
Steaming	蒸 or 燖	Zhēng or xún	Steaming food to completion over boiling water and its rising water vapour.
Distillation simmering	醇	Chún	A cooking technique requiring the using of a unique lidded vessel, known as the steam-pot (Chinese: 汽鍋), with a chimney rising from inside the bowl that is covered also by a lid. Food ingredients are placed without cooking liquid in the vessel and the entire lidded vessel is seated on top of a pot of boiling water. Steam rising from the pot distills as hot water in the lidded vessel and cooks the ingredients while immersing it in soup. Used to prepare "pure" restorative foods such as steam-pot chicken.

=== Dry ===
==== Air-based ====
Food preparation in hot dry vessels such as an oven or a heated empty wok include:

English equivalent	Chinese	Pinyin	Description
Baking or roasting	烤	Kǎo	Cooking by hot air through convection or broiling in an enclosed space
Grilling	炙[烤]	zhì [kǎo]	Cooking by direct radiant heat typically on skewers over charcoal.
Smoking	熏	Xūn	Cooking in direct heat with smoke. The source of the smoke is typically sugar or tea.

==== Oil-based ====
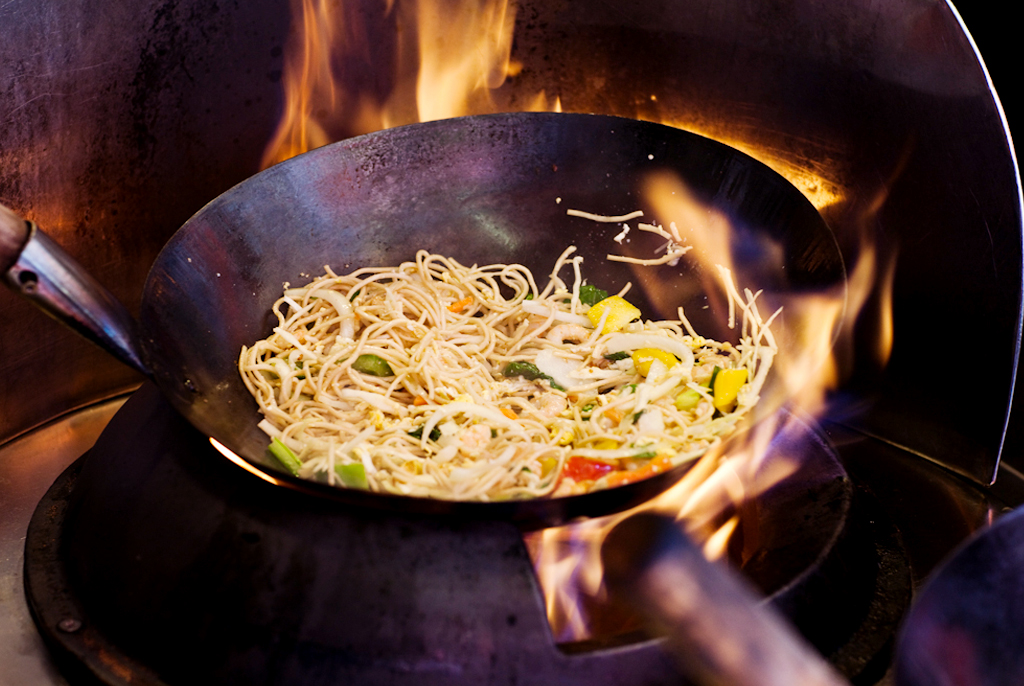
Stir frying (爆; bào) is a Chinese cooking technique involving relatively large amounts of oil.

Oil-based cooking methods are one of the most common in Chinese cuisine and include:

English Equivalent	Chinese	Pinyin	Description
Deep frying or Frying	炸	Zhá	Full or partial immersion cooking in hot oil or fat
Pan frying	煎	Jiān	Cooking in a pan with a light coating of oil or liquid and allowing the food to brown.
Stir frying or high heat Sautéing	炒	Chǎo	Cooking ingredients at hot oil and stirring quickly to completion. This technique, as well as bào chǎo and yóu bào (爆炒 and 油爆), is known in English as stir frying. This technique uses higher heat than that of sautéing.
Flash-frying or High heat Stir frying	[油]爆	[Yóu]Bào	Cooking with large amounts hot oil, sauces (酱爆; jiàng bào), or broth (汤爆; tāng bào) at very high heat and tossing the ingredients in the wok to completion.

===== Stir frying =====
Kian Lam Kho identifies five distinct techniques of stir frying:

English Equivalent	Chinese	Pinyin	Description
Plain stir-fry or Simple stir-fry	清炒	qīngchǎo	To stir-fry a single ingredient (with aromatics and sauces). A plain stir-fry using garlic is known as 蒜炒, suànchǎo.
Dry stir-fry or Dry wok stir-fry	煸炒	biānchǎo	To stir-fry a combination of protein and vegetable ingredients (with a small amount of liquid)
Moist stir-fry	滑炒	huáchǎo	To stir-fry a combination of protein and vegetable ingredients (with a gravy-like sauce)
Dry-fry or Extreme-heat stir-fry	干煸	gānbiān	To scorch in oil before stir-frying (with no addition of water)
Scramble stir-fry	软炒	ruǎnchǎo	A technique for making egg custard.

=== Without heat ===
Food preparation techniques not involving the heating of ingredients include:

Raw methods
English Equivalent	Chinese	Pinyin	Description
Dressing	拌	Bàn	Mixing raw or unflavoured cooked ingredients with seasonings and served immediately. Similar to tossing a dressing into salad.
Marinating or pickling	腌 or 醬	Yān or Jiàng	To pickle or marinade ingredients in salt, soy sauce or soy pastes. Use for making pickles or preparing ingredients for addition cooking.
Jellifying	冻	Dòng	To quickly cool a gelatin or agarose containing broth to make aspic or agar jelly
Velveting	上浆	Shàng Jiāng	This technique involves marinating meat in corn starch and other ingredients before cooking. This produces a velvety texture.

== Combination ==
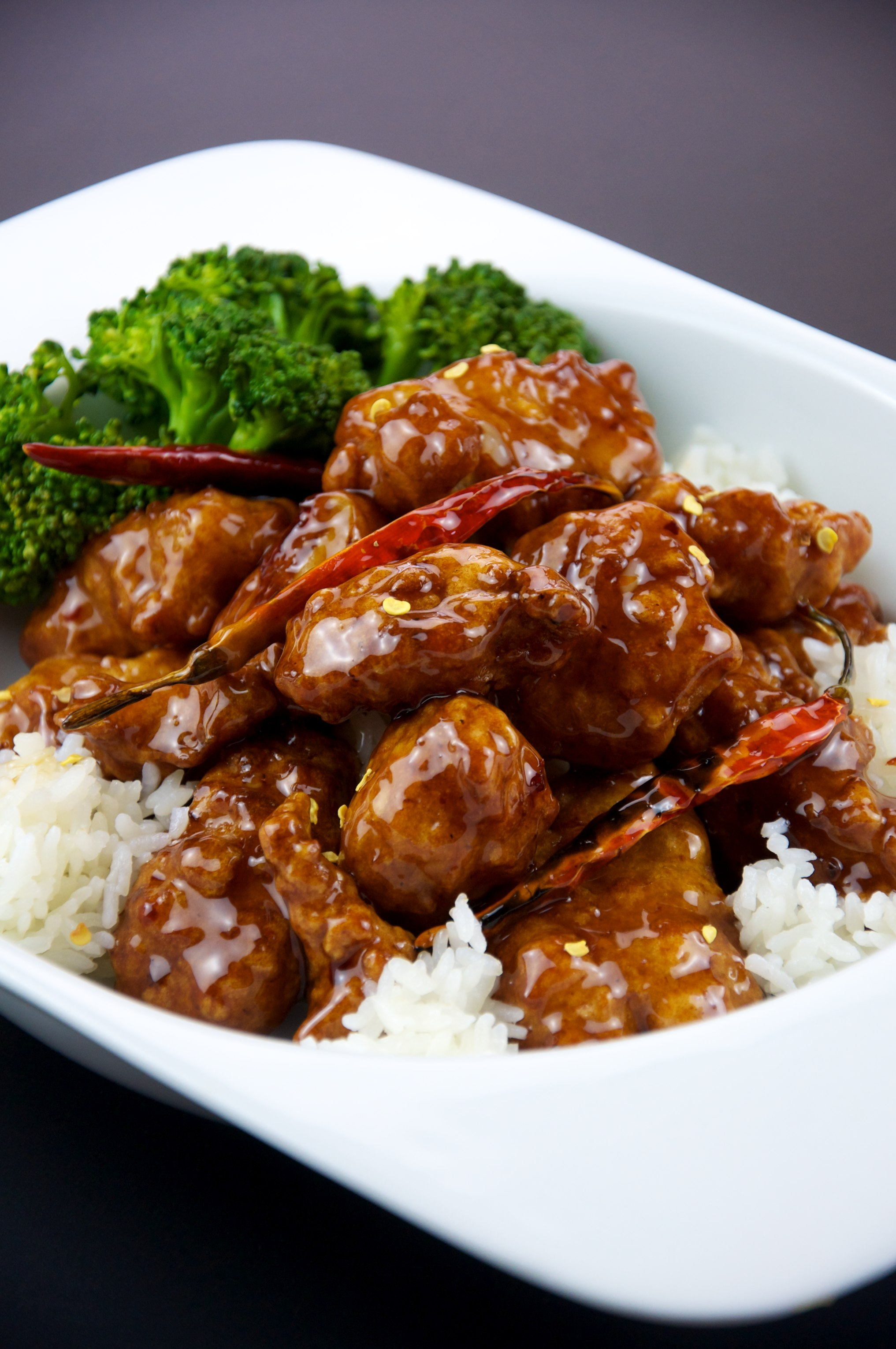
The chicken in General Tso's chicken has been fried and lightly braised in sauce (溜; liū).

Several techniques in Chinese involve more than one stage of cooking and have their own terms to describe the process. They include:

- Dòng (凍): The technique is used for making aspic but also used to describe making of various gelatin desserts
  1. Simmering meat for a prolonged period in a broth (滷; Lǔ) or (炖; dùn)
  2. Chilling the resulting meat and broth until the mixture gels
- Hùi (燴): The dishes made using this technique are usually finished by thickening with starch (勾芡; gōuqiàn)
  1. Quick precooking in hot water (燙; tàng)
  2. Finished by stir-frying (爆; bào, 炒; chǎo) and 燒; shāo)
- Liū (溜): This technique is commonly used for meat and fish. Pre-fried tofu is made expressly for this purpose.
  1. Deep frying (炸; zhá) the ingredients until partially cooked
  2. Finishing the ingredients by lightly braising (燒; shāo) them to acquire a soft "skin"
- Mēn (燜):
  1. Stir-frying (爆; bào or 炒; chǎo) the ingredients until partially cooked
  2. Cover and simmer (燒; shāo) with broth until broth is fully reduced and ingredients are fully cooked.

== See also ==
- Chinese cuisine
- List of cooking techniques
- Wok
