= Northeastern Chinese cuisine =

Style of Chinese cuisine in Northeast China

- Simplified Chinese: 东北菜
- Traditional Chinese: 東北菜
Transcriptions
Standard Mandarin
- Hanyu Pinyin: Dōngběi cài

Northeastern Chinese cuisine is a style of Chinese cuisine in Northeast China. While many dishes originated in Shandong cuisine and Manchu cuisine, it is also influenced by the cuisines of Russia, Beijing, Mongolia, and North Korea. It partially relies on preserved foods and large portions due to the region's harsh winters and relatively short growing seasons.

Pickling is a very common form of food preservation. Suan cai, or pickled Chinese cabbage, is traditionally made by most households in giant clay pickling vats. Another distinct feature that distinguishes Northeastern cuisine from other Chinese cuisines is the serving of more raw vegetables and raw seafood in the coastal areas.

Simmering, braising and sautéing are ubiquitous cooking techniques used in the Northeast, producing many of the region's signature dishes.

Northeast Chinese include a large component of wheat and maize in their daily diet in the form of noodles, steamed bun and cornbread. Popular dishes include pork and chive dumplings, suan cai hot pot, cumin and caraway lamb, congee, tea eggs, nian doubao (sticky rice buns with sweet red bean paste filling, and unsweetened version with other beans also), congee with several types of pickles (mustard root is highly popular), sachima (traditional Manchu sweet) and cornmeal congee.

Due to its riverine environment, the Heilongjiang style of Northeastern Chinese cuisine is famed for its fish banquet, specialising in anadromous fish such as the trout banquet and the sturgeon banquet, and similarly, due to its mountainous environment, the Jilin style of Northeastern Chinese cuisine is famed for its dishes that use game animals even though only farm-raised animals are allowed for culinary use under the law. Liaoning cuisine is a rising star among Chinese cuisines and has become increasingly popular recently. Furthermore, Liaoning chefs have continuously won awards in recent culinary arts competitions in China.

== Ingredients ==
The climate of Northern China is too cold and dry to support rice cultivation. The main staple crop of these regions is wheat. The Uyghur use wheat flour in bread recipes, but other ethnic groups use it for noodles or steamed dumplings. Other important grains include sorghum, maize and millet. Sorghum and millet are used to make an alcoholic beverage called maotai.

== Classic dishes ==
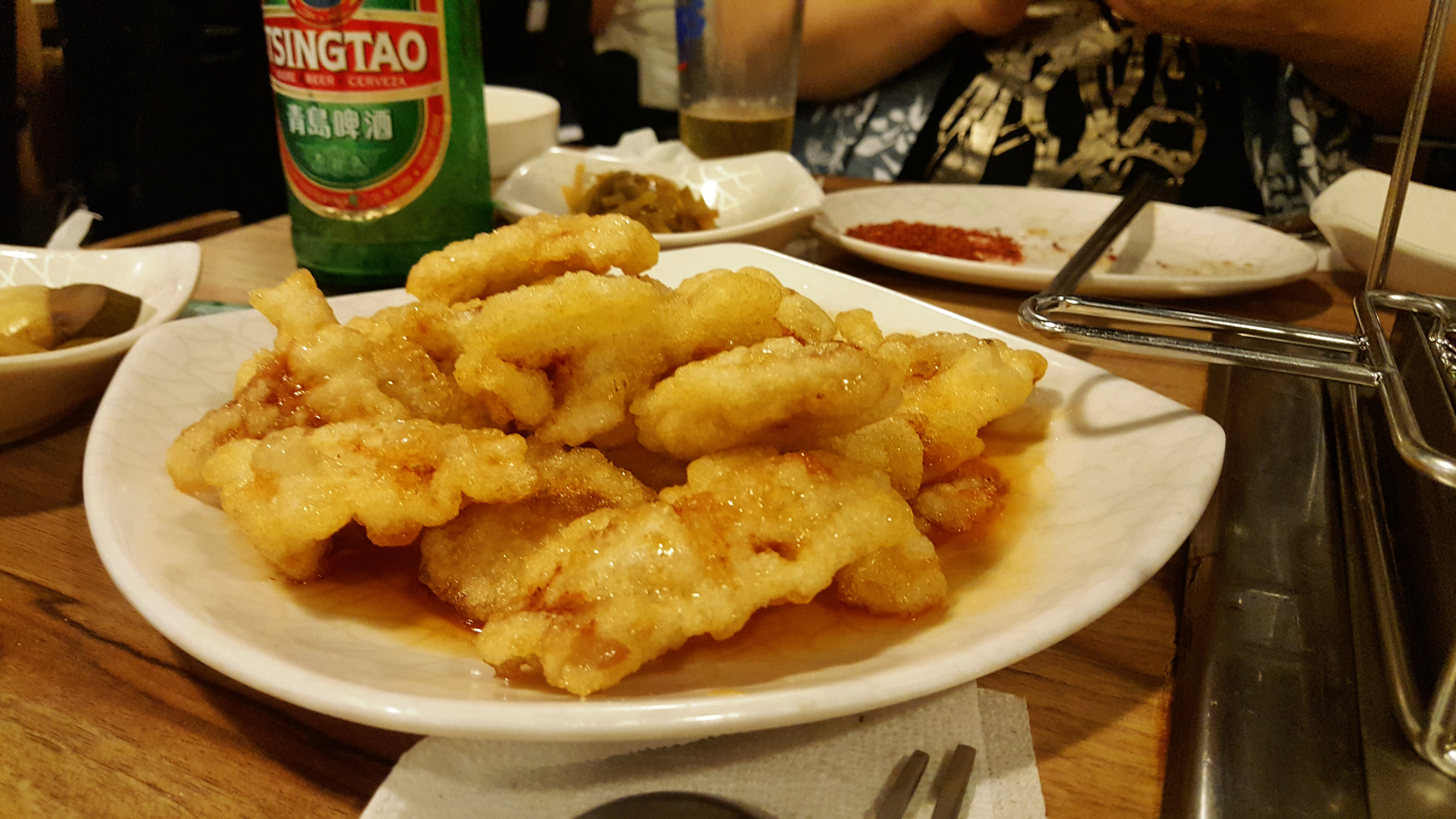
Guo bao rou

- Northeastern hot pot (东北火锅, pork belly hot pot with suan cai)
- Borscht (羅宋湯)
- Guo bao rou (锅包肉)
- The Four Northeastern Simmerings (东北四大炖)
  - Pork with cellophane noodle (猪肉炖粉条)
  - Free-range chicken with honey fungus (小鸡炖榛蘑)
  - Catfish with eggplant (鲇鱼炖茄子)
  - Pork ribs with common bean (排骨炖豆角)
- Northeastern hotchpotch (东北乱炖, potato, bean, Chinese cabbage, eggplant, wood ear and random vegetables stewed with pork belly)
- Fatty pork with blood sausage (白肉血肠)
- Di san xian (地三鲜, fried potato, green pepper and eggplant)
- Bear paws stew (扒熊掌)
- Shredded potato stir-fry (酸辣土豆丝)
- Caramelized sweet potato (拔丝地瓜)
- Qié hé (茄盒), stuffed eggplant
- Mantou (饅頭), steamed bun/bread
- Wotou (窝头), cornbread
- Potato-stuffed dumplings (土豆饺子)
- Hua juan (flower twists, 花卷), steamed scallion roll
- Dongbei lengmian (东北冷面)
- Kaojijia (烤鸡架), roasted chicken frame

== Snacks ==
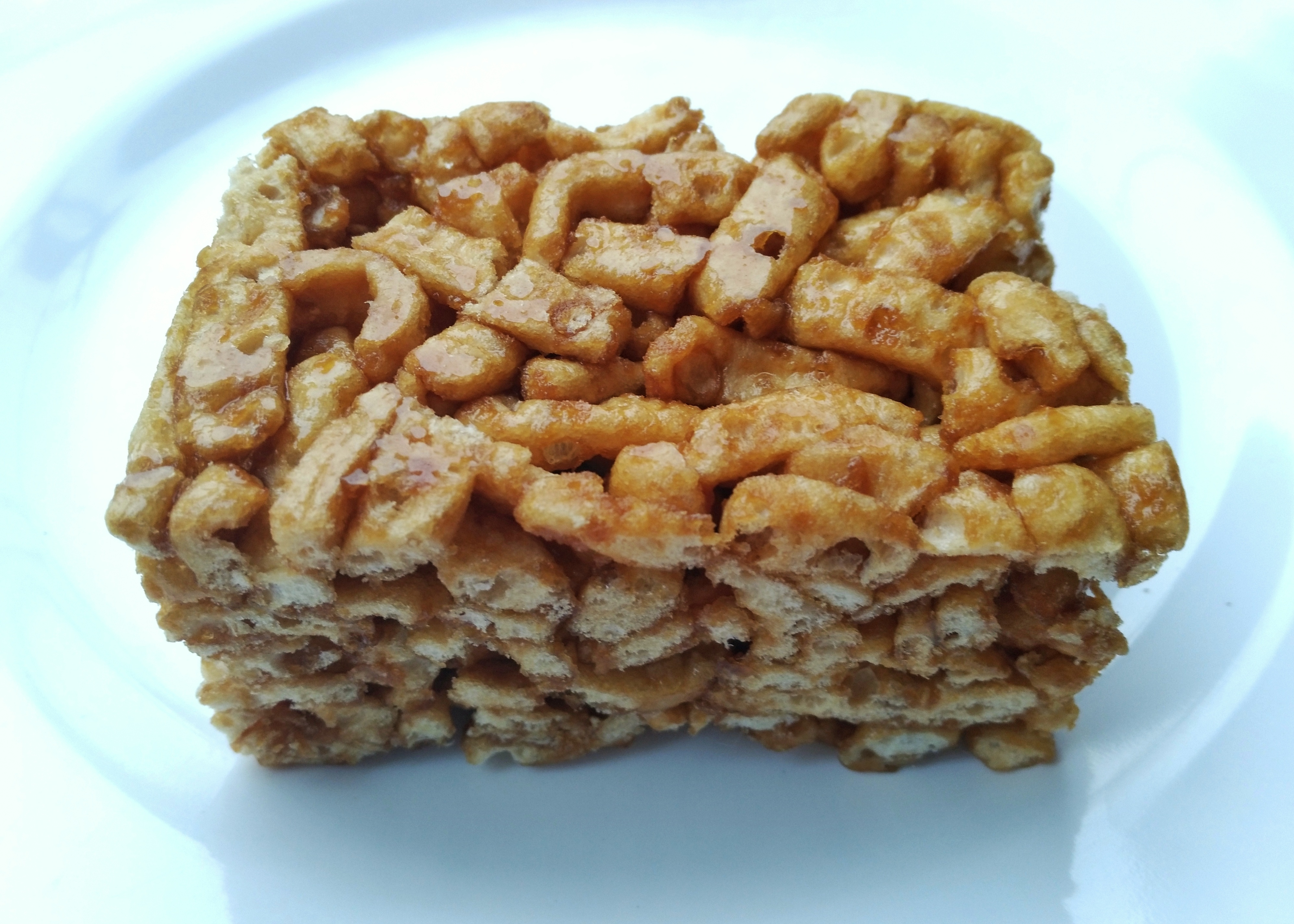
- Sachima
  Sachima (沙琪玛)
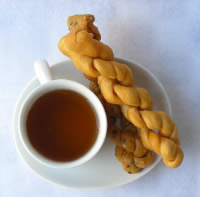
- Mahua with tea
  Mahua (snack) (麻花)
- Red Bean Bun (豆沙包)
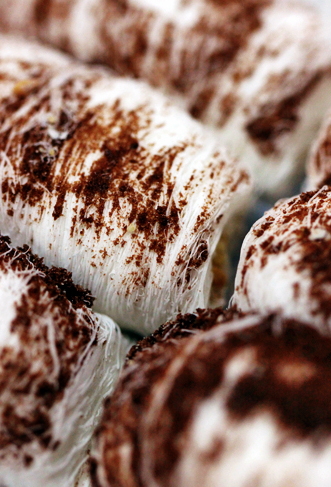
- Dragon's beard candy
  Dragon's beard candy (龙须糖)

== See also ==
- List of Chinese dishes
- Chinatown, Flushing
