= Shaokao =

Chinese term for barbecue

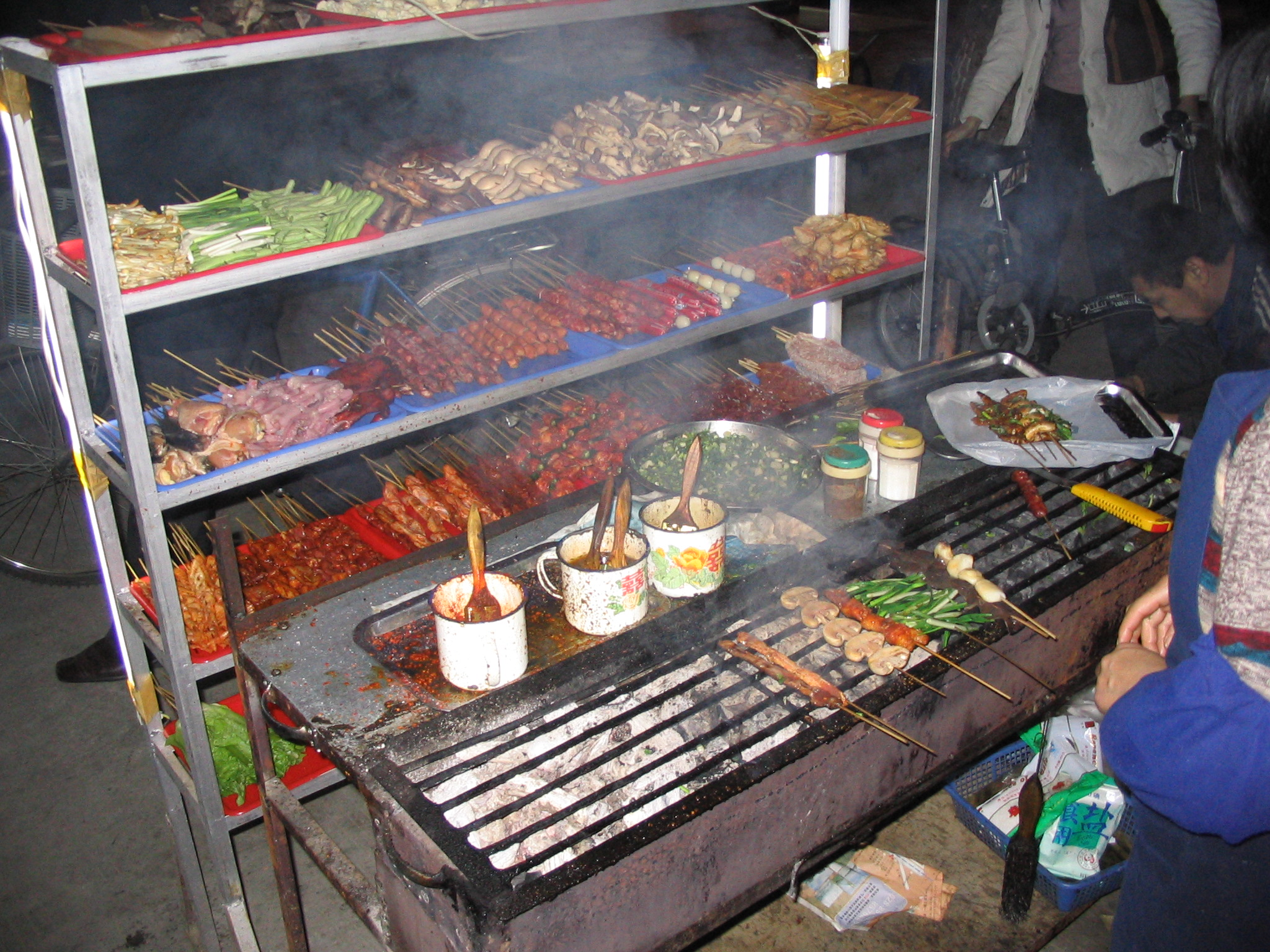
Shaokao (street stall barbecue) outside Chengdu University in Sichuan, China

Shaokao (traditional Chinese: 燒烤; simplified Chinese: 烧烤; pinyin: shāo kǎo), also romanized as shao kao, is the Chinese translation of "barbecue". Chinese variants of the practice constitute a significant aspect of Chinese cuisine. In China, it is predominantly found on busy Chinese streets and night markets as street food sold in food stalls and is a type of xiaochi. In China and elsewhere, such as in the United States, diners sometimes also order beer as an accompaniment.

Shaokao typically consists of heavily spiced, barbecued foods on skewers. It is available in almost all of the cities in China, and is a prominent dish in Beijing, China, where some restaurants set up food stalls outdoors to purvey the product. Concerns about air pollution generated from shaokao vendors associated with increased smog levels in Beijing have prompted restrictions.

== Kaochuan or yangrouchuan ==
A Halal shaokao stall owned by Hui Muslims in Lanzhou, 2023

The main part of shaokao is "Yangrouchuan" or "kaochuan".

(yangrouchaun is 羊肉串, this refers to lamb skewers only)

Yangrouchuan typically consists of heavily spiced, barbecued foods on skewers. In China, mutton skewers (Chinese pinyin: kǎochuàn; Uighur: كاۋاپ, kawap), or grilled skewers, skewers, have a long history, from April to July 2012, Ningxia Institute of Cultural Relics and Archaeology. When the fourth archaeological excavation was carried out in the Lehan cemetery, meat skewers were found in the M17 tomb. In the archaeological finds of the Liao dynasty, it was found that an unearthed mural on the Aohan Banner in Inner Mongolia was painted with three Khitan people in a coffin, sitting around the hot pot and eating skewers and clams. But in modern times, the popularity of skewers spread from Xinjiang to various places around 1980.

In China, skewers often sell other types of grilled foods at the same time, so skewers are often referred to as grills, and kebabs are often used as a synonym for skewers as the most common skewer. The behavior of eating skewers is called eating barbecues, skewers, and the like. Due to the different eating habits of different localities and ethnic groups, the style of skewers varies from region to region.

== History ==
=== Early evidence of grilling and skewered meat ===
Barbecue scene depicted on a brick painting from a Wei-Jin dynasty tomb in Jiayuguan, Gansu; in the collection of the Gansu Provincial Museum.

Grilling and the preparation of skwered meat have a long history in China, although the origins of modern shaokao are unclear. Archaeological evidence of such practices survives in Han-dynasty funerary reliefs. Two stone reliefs depicting kitchen activities, excavated from the late Eastern Han tomb, Mawangdui No. 1, at Wulibao in Linyi in the southwest of Shandong, show figures grilling skewered meat, including scenes in which one person holds the skewers while another fans the fire. The reliefs are currently held by the Linyi Museum.

Similar depictions of meat grilling have been identified in Han-dynasty funerary art from other parts of China, including Henan, Jiangsu and Sichuan.

=== Regional grilling traditions ===
In the early Ming dynasty, beef or mutton was cut into cubes, marinated briefly with chopped scallions, salt, and fermented soybean sauce, and then grilled. During the late Ming and early Qing dynasties, Mongols would briefly boil large pieces of beef or mutton before roasting them over a fire fuelled by dried cattle dung.

Over time, grilling techniques continued to develop and become more refined. In 1845, the 25th year of the Daoguang reign, the poet Yang Jingting (楊靜亭) praised roast meat in his Dumen Zayong "都門雜詠":

嚴冬烤肉味堪饕，大酒缸前圍一遭。

火灸最宜生嗜嫩，雪天爭的醉燒刀。

In the bitter winter, roasted meat is a delight to savour; people gather around the great wine vat.

Meat is best when lightly roasted and tender; amid the snow, they compete to drink fiery spirits.

== Prominence ==
Shaokao can be found in almost all of the cities in China. They are often located along streets that have a strip of bars. In China, some shaokao food stalls also purvey other goods such as produce that are displayed hanging on sticks. There are also restaurants that specialize in shaokao dishes.

Due to the increase of emigration from mainland China in the 1990s and beyond, shaokao restaurants are also appearing in the United States, Canada, Australia and other countries with large Chinese diasporas.

=== In Beijing ===
In Beijing, shaokao is a very common and popular food, and some restaurants in Beijing set-up shaokao barbecues outside of the restaurants to purvey them to people walking on the streets. Shaokao stands are sometimes operated by migrant workers in Beijing. Shaokao stand operators are sometimes reported to the police in Beijing by neighbors who complain about the smoke and aroma that gets into homes, as well as about concerns about food poisoning that can occur from improper meat handling and cooking. In 2013, outdoor barbecue stands were banned due to heavy smog conditions. Chinese authorities have stated that shaokao operations and Chunjie fireworks are a significant cause of smog in Beijing.

=== In Thailand ===
Beginning around 2016, shaokao became a trending style of cooking in Chiang Mai and Chiang Rai in Thailand. It subsequently became popular in Bangkok and other parts of Thailand. In Thailand, shaokao is referred to as mala.

== See also ==
- Brochette
- Kebab
- List of Chinese dishes
- List of street foods
- Mixed grill
- Chuan (food)
