= Indigenous cuisine of the Americas =

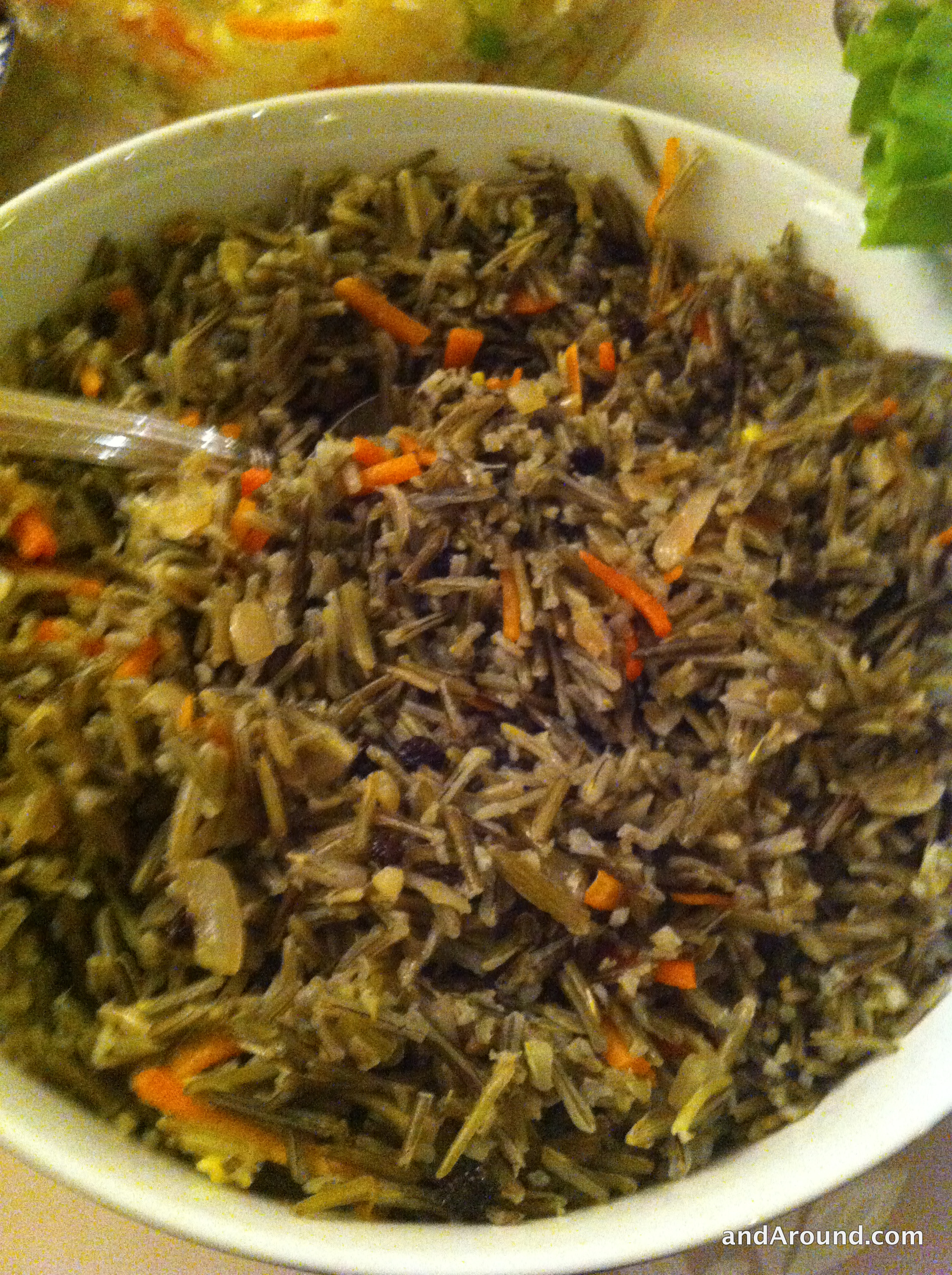
Wild rice is a native traditional food of Minnesota, Wisconsin, Michigan, and some areas of North Dakota.

Indigenous cuisine of the Americas includes all cuisines and food practices of the Indigenous peoples of the Americas. Contemporary native peoples retain a varied culture of traditional foods, along with the addition of some post-contact foods that have become customary and even iconic of present-day Indigenous American social gatherings (e.g. frybread). Foods like cornbread, turkey, cranberry, blueberry, hominy, and mush have been adopted into the cuisine of the broader United States population from Native American cultures.

In other cases, documents from the early periods of Indigenous American contact with European, African, and Asian peoples have allowed the recovery and revitalization of Indigenous food practices that had formerly passed out of popularity.

The most important Indigenous American crops have generally included Indian corn (or maize, from the Taíno name for the plant), beans, squash, pumpkins, sunflowers, wild rice, sweet potatoes, tomatoes, peppers, peanuts, avocados, papayas, potatoes and chocolate.

Indigenous cuisine of the Americas uses domesticated and wild native ingredients. As the Americas cover a large range of biomes, and there are more than 574 currently federally recognized Native American tribes in the US alone, Indigenous cuisine can vary significantly by region and culture. For example, North American Native cuisine differs from Southwestern and Mexican cuisine in its simplicity and directness of flavor.

== Indigenous cuisine of North America ==
=== Country food ===
Country food, in Canada, refers to the traditional diets of the Indigenous peoples in Canada (known in Canada as First Nations, Metis, and Inuit), especially in remote northern regions where Western food is an expensive import, and traditional foods are still relied upon.

The Government of the Northwest Territories estimated in 2015 that nearly half of Northwest Territories residents in smaller communities relied on country food for 75% of their meat and fish intake; in larger communities, the percentage was lower, with the lowest percentage relying on country foods (4%) being in Yellowknife, the capital and only "large community".

The most common country foods in the Northwest Territories area include mammals and birds (caribou, moose, ducks, geese, seals, hare, grouse, ptarmigan), fish (lake trout, char, inconnu, whitefish, pike, burbot) and berries (blueberries, cranberries, blackberries, cloudberries).

In the eastern Canadian Arctic, Inuit consume a diet of foods that are fished, hunted, and gathered locally. This may include caribou, walrus, ringed seal, bearded seal, beluga whale, polar bear, berries, and fireweed.

The cultural value attached to certain game species, and certain parts, varies. For example, in the James Bay region, a 1982 study found that beluga whale meat was principally used as dog food, whereas the blubber, or muktuk was a "valued delicacy". Value also varies by age, with Inuit preferring younger ring seals, and often using the older ones for dog food.

Contaminants in country foods are a public health concern in Northern Canada; volunteers are tested to track the spread of industrial chemicals from emitters (usually in the South) into the northern food web via the air and water.

In 2017, the Government of the Northwest Territories committed to using country foods in the soon-to-open Stanton Territorial Hospital, despite the challenges of obtaining, inspecting, and preparing sufficient quantities of wild game and plants.

In Southern Canada, wild foods (especially meats) are relatively rare in restaurants, due to wildlife conservation rules against selling hunted meat, as well as strict meat inspection rules. There is a cultural divide between rural and remote communities that rely on wild foods, and urban Canadians (the majority), who have little or no experience with them.

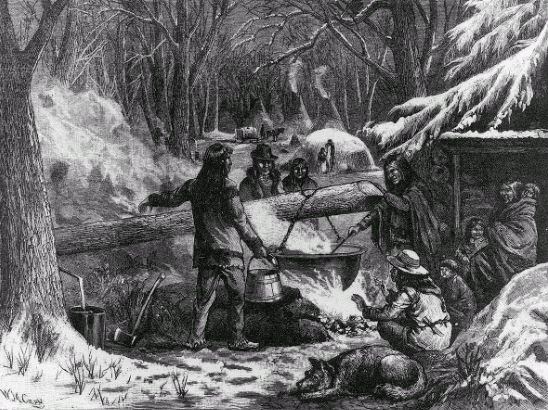
A 19th-century illustration, "Sugar-Making Among the Indians in the North". Aboriginal peoples living in the northeastern part of North America were the first people known to have produced maple syrup and maple sugar

=== Eastern Native American cuisine ===
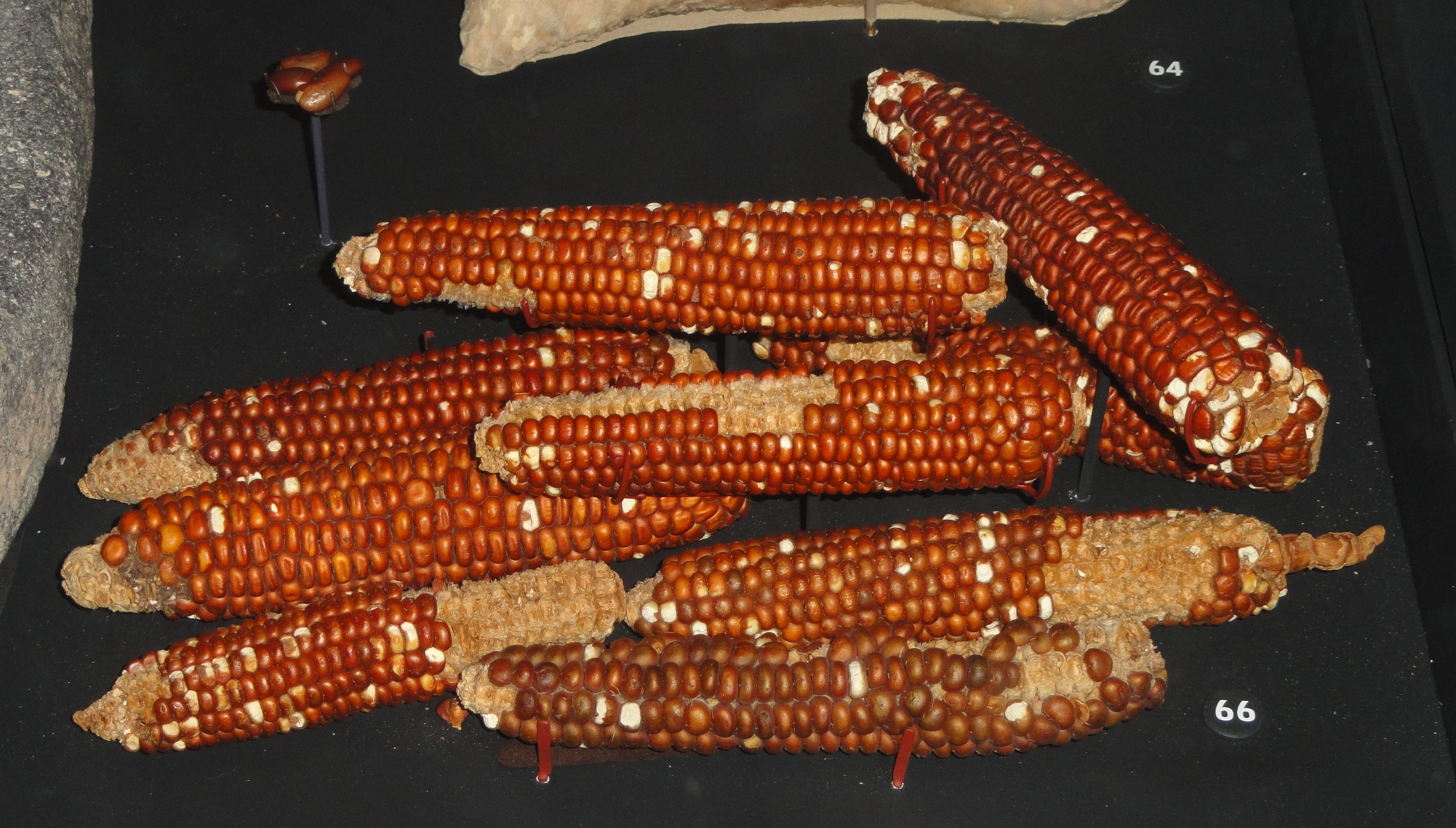
Corn was a vital source of food for Indigenous communities across the Northern Hemisphere. Sophisticated farming techniques were used to cultivate the crop throughout the American continent.

The essential staple foods of the Indigenous peoples of the Eastern Woodlands have traditionally been corn (also known as maize), beans, and squash, known as "The Three Sisters" because they were planted interdependently: the beans grew up the tall stalks of the corn, while the squash spread out at the base of the three plants and provided protection and support for the root systems.

Maple syrup is another essential food staple of the Eastern Woodlands peoples. Tree sap is collected from sugar maple trees during the beginning of springtime when the nights are still cold. Birch bark containers are used in the process of making maple syrup, maple cakes, maple sugar, and maple taffy. When the sap is boiled to a certain temperature, different variations of maple food products are created. When the sap starts to thicken, it can be poured into the snow to make taffy.

Since the first colonists of New England had to adapt their foods to the local crops and resources, the Native influences of Southern New England Algonquian cuisine form a significant part of New England cuisine with dishes such as cornbread, succotash and Johnnycakes and ingredients such as corn, cranberries and local species of clam still enjoyed in the region today.

The Wabanaki tribal nations and other eastern woodlands peoples have made nut milk and infant formula made from nuts and cornmeal, while the Cherokee nation made Kanuchi soup from hickory nuts.

=== Southeastern Native American cuisine ===
Southeastern Native American culture has contributed to the formation of Southern cuisine from its origins through the present day. From Southeastern Native American culture came one of the main staples of the Southern diet: corn (maize), either ground into meal or limed with an alkaline salt to make hominy, using a Native American technique known as nixtamalization. Corn is used to make all kinds of dishes such as the familiar cornbread and grits.

Though a less important staple, potatoes were also adopted from Native American cuisine and have been used in many ways similar to corn. Native Americans introduced the first non-Native American Southerners to many other vegetables still familiar on southern tables. Squash, pumpkin, many types of beans, many types of peppers, and sassafras all came to the settlers via Indigenous peoples. The Virginia Algonquian word pawcohiccora means hickory-nut meat or a nut milk drink made from it.

Many fruits are available in this region. Muscadines, blackberries, raspberries, and many other wild berries were part of Southern Native Americans' diet.

To a far greater degree than anyone realizes, several of the most important food dishes of the Southeastern Indians live on today in the "soul food" eaten by both black and white Southerners. Hominy, for example, is still eaten ... Sofkee lives on as grits ... cornbread [is] used by Southern cooks ... Indian fritters ... variously known as "hoe cake", ... or "Johnny cake." ... Indians boiled cornbread is present in Southern cuisine as "corn meal dumplings", ... and as "hush puppies", boiled in oil instead of water. ... Southerners cook their beans and field peas by boiling them, as did the Indians ... Like the Indians they cure their meat and smoke it over hickory coals ...

— Charles Hudson, The Southeastern Indians

Southeastern Native Americans traditionally supplement their diets with meat from hunting native game. Venison is a vital staple meat, due to the abundance of white-tailed deer in the region. Rabbits, squirrels, opossums, and raccoons are also common. Although it may have been secondary to game hunting, fishing is also an important food source; many peoples lived near rivers and other consistent sources of fish. Indigenous fishing methods in the Southeast include shooting with arrows, spearing or gigging, trapping with weirs or dams, poisoning with fish toxins, bare-hand noodling, and netting. Fish were often roasted, while small or very bony fish were stewed for use in soup.

Livestock, adopted from Europeans, in the form of hogs and cattle, are also kept. Aside from the more commonly consumed parts of the animal, it is traditional to also eat organ meats such as liver, brains, and intestines. Many of the early settlers were taught Southeastern Native American cooking methods.

==== Selected dishes ====
- Cornbread
- Hominy, coarsely ground corn used to make grits
- Hush puppy, small, savory, deep-fried round ball made from cornmeal-based batter
- Indian fritter
- Kanuchi, soup made from ground hickory nuts
- Livermush, pig liver, parts of pig heads, cornmeal and spices
- Sofkee, corn soup or drink, sour

=== Great Plains Native American cuisine ===
Indigenous peoples of the Great Plains and Canadian Prairies or Plains Indians have historically relied heavily on American bison (American buffalo) as a staple food source. One traditional method of preparation is to cut the meat into thin slices then dry it, either over a slow fire or in the hot sun, until it is hard and brittle. In this form it can last for months, making it a main ingredient to be combined with other foods, or eaten on its own.

One such use could be pemmican, a concentrated mixture of fat and protein, and fruits such as cranberries, Saskatoon berries, blueberries, cherries, chokecherries, and currants are sometimes added. Many parts of the bison were utilized and prepared in numerous ways, including: "boiled meat, tripe soup perhaps thickened with brains, roasted intestines, jerked/smoked meat, and raw kidneys, liver, tongue sprinkled with gall or bile were eaten immediately after a kill."

The animals that Great Plains Indians consumed, like bison, deer, and antelope, were grazing animals. Due to this, they were high in omega-3 fatty acids, an essential fatty acid that many diets lack.

When asked to state traditional staple foods, a group of Plains elders identified prairie turnips (Pediomelum esculentum, syn. Psoralea esculenta), called timpsula or tin'psila in the Lakota language group; fruits (chokecherries, June berries, plums, blueberries, cranberries, strawberries, buffalo berries, gooseberries); potatoes; squash; dried meats (venison, buffalo, jack rabbit, and prairie chicken); and wild rice as being these staple foods.

"We landed at a Watlala village 200 men of Flatheads of 25 houses 50 canoes built of Straw, we were treated verry kindly by them, they gave us round root near the size of a hens egg roasted which they call Wap-to (wapato) to eate . . . . which they roasted in the embers until they became Soft"

—William Clark, Lewis and Clark Expedition

Wapato (Sagittaria latifolia) has a number of varieties and is found growing in damp marsh area around ponds, lakes, rivers, and streams. The edible rhizomes were gathered and could be roasted in the embers of a fire, or dried, ground and the meal pressed into a cake which "served well as bread" as noted by Meriwether Lewis of the Lewis and Clark Expedition. They are known today as broadleaf arrowhead, arrowhead, duckroot, or duck-potato.

=== Western Indigenous cuisine ===
In the Pacific Northwest, traditional diets include salmon and other fish, seafood, mushrooms, berries, roots and tubers, and meats such as deer, duck, and rabbit.

In contrast to the Easterners, the Northwestern peoples are traditionally hunter-gatherers, primarily. The generally mild climate led to the development of an economy based on year-round abundant food supplies, rather than having to rely upon seasonal agriculture. Yet, Native American tribes of California still relied on storing food for winter seasons, which included "nuts, seeds, and dried meat and fish". Since animals migrated, vegetation is seasonal, and also weather needs to be taken into account.

In what is now California, acorns can be ground into a flour that has at times served as the principal foodstuff for about 75 percent of the population, and dried meats can be prepared during the dry season. It seems that acorns and other nuts took priority among Indigenous tribes because of the archaeological evidence of "mortars and pestles". Grinding acorns requires a lot of resources and time to gather and process them, which implies an area where location is more permanent. Gathering acorns took everyone in the tribe, because within weeks, the acorns would mature. Obtaining food was done communally. Acorns were ground to make soups and bread.

Indigenous tribes along the California region used "over 500 species of plants and animals for food".

Archaeological methods suggest the use of flames and cutting materials altered bones from rodents. The presence of rodent bones in Quiroste archaeological sites suggests that the Quiroste people ate rodents.

Deer and seal bones are also found in Indigenous communities. This means that the diet is varied, as seals are found near the coast and deer are found further inland.

Other evidence is through the use of screening that found anchovies to be a source of food for Indigenous people. This is a valuable discovery because anchovies are difficult to come by due to their fragile bones.

Indigenous tribes were consuming the meat of shellfish with the implication of "bi-pitted cobbles". The meat of shellfish required stone tools to crack open the shells.

The consumption of marrow from animal bones is evident from archaeological analyses of "hand axes made from andesitic and quartzitic cobbles". Obtaining bone marrow from an animal requires both time and resources, as it is located in the center of the bone and requires extra effort to extract.

The destruction of Native California was done by the missionaries taking over the Indigenous land and clearing the environment for their own cultural foodways. This caused some Indigenous tribes to become dependent on missionaries for survival. Archaeological evidence shows that some Indigenous tribes were eating cattle because of the reliance they had on missionaries.

Although some tribes relied on the food from missionaries, they still hunted for their own food from the evidence of birds found that know to migrate to the area seasonally. Although they were fed by missionaries, they required more food. That's when their own foodways came into play for hunting and preparing the food they captured.

Native tribes living along the confines of missionaries were only able to gather "wheat, maize, barley, and peach".

Food not only played an important role in subsistence but also an important role in ceremonies, especially to mourn someone's death.

The preparation for making atole was done by toasting the wheat before it was granulated.

There are still Indigenous people who are keeping their traditions alive through modern cuisine. Crystal Wahpepah sees her kitchen as a way to promote Indigenous "food sovereignty and the reclamation of ancestral knowledge".

=== Southwestern Indigenous cuisine ===
Ancestral Puebloans of the present-day Four Corners region of the United States, comprising Arizona, Colorado, New Mexico, and Utah, initially practiced subsistence agriculture by cultivating maize, beans, squash, sunflower seeds, and pine nuts from the pinyon pine, and game meat including venison and cuniculture, and freshwater fish such as Rio Grande cutthroat trout and rainbow trout are also traditional foods in the region.

Ancestral Puebloans are also known for their basketry and pottery, indicating both an agricultural surplus that needed to be carried and stored, and clay pot cooking. Grinding stones have been used to grind maize into meal for cooking. Archaeological digs indicate a very early domestication of turkeys for food.

New Mexican cuisine is heavily rooted in both Pueblo and Hispano food traditions, and is a prevalent cuisine in the American Southwest, especially in New Mexico.

The 2002 Foods of the Southwest Indian Nations won a James Beard Award, the first Native American cookbook so honored. Publishers had told the author, Lois Ellen Frank, that there was no such thing as Native American cuisine.

=== Alaska Native cuisine ===
Alaska Native cuisine consists of nutrient-dense foods such as seal, fish (salmon), and moose. Along with these, berries (huckleberries) and bird eggs are traditionally consumed by Alaska Natives.

Seal, walruses, and polar bears are the large game that Alaska Natives hunt. Smaller game includes whitefish, Arctic char, Arctic hare, and ptarmigan.

Due to weather, edible plants like berries are only available to be consumed in the summer, so people have a diet very high in fat and protein, but low in carbohydrates.

The game that is hunted is also used for clothing. The intestines of large mammals are used to make waterproof clothing and caribou fur is used to make warm clothing.

=== Dishes ===
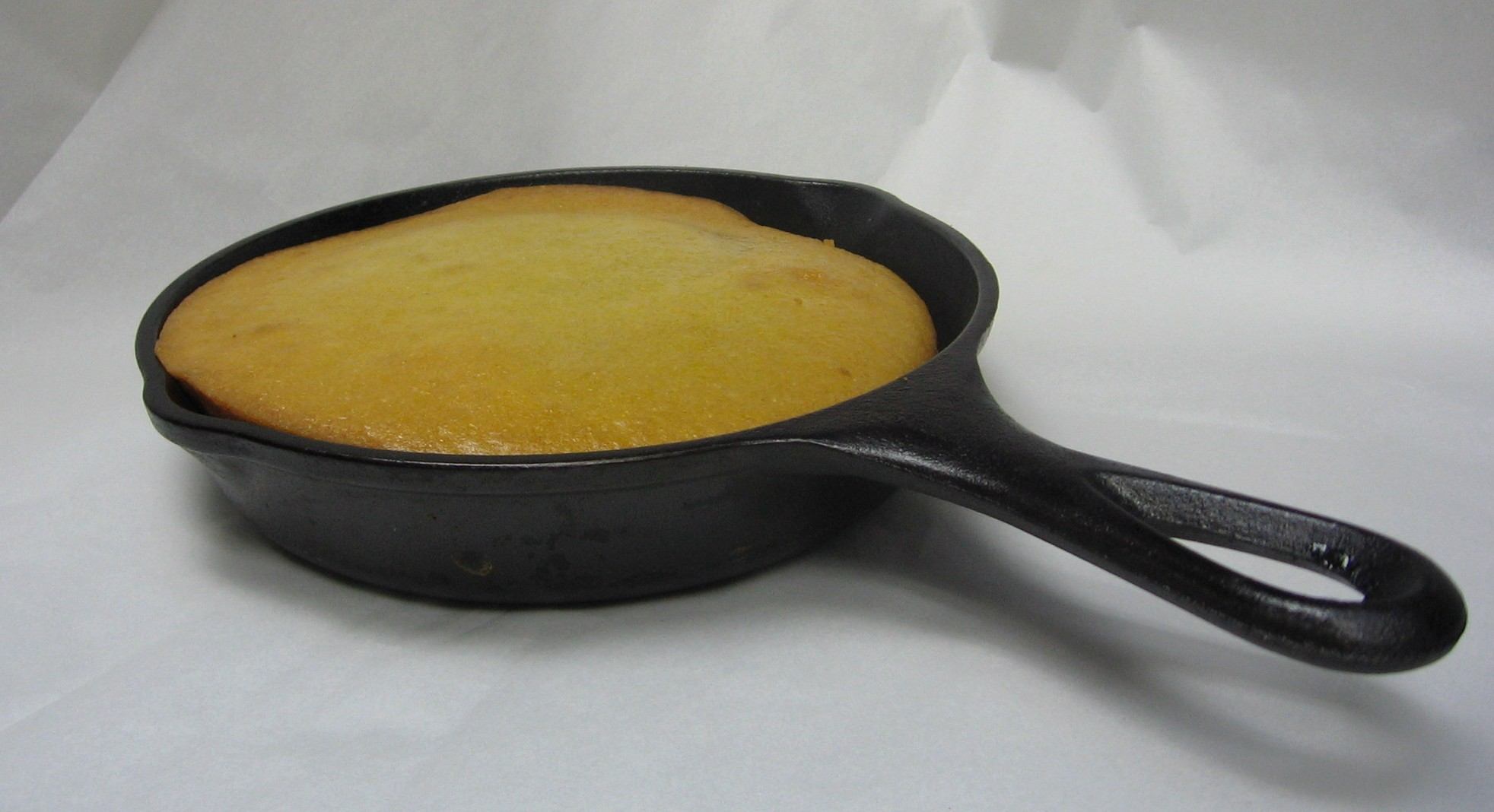
Cornbread

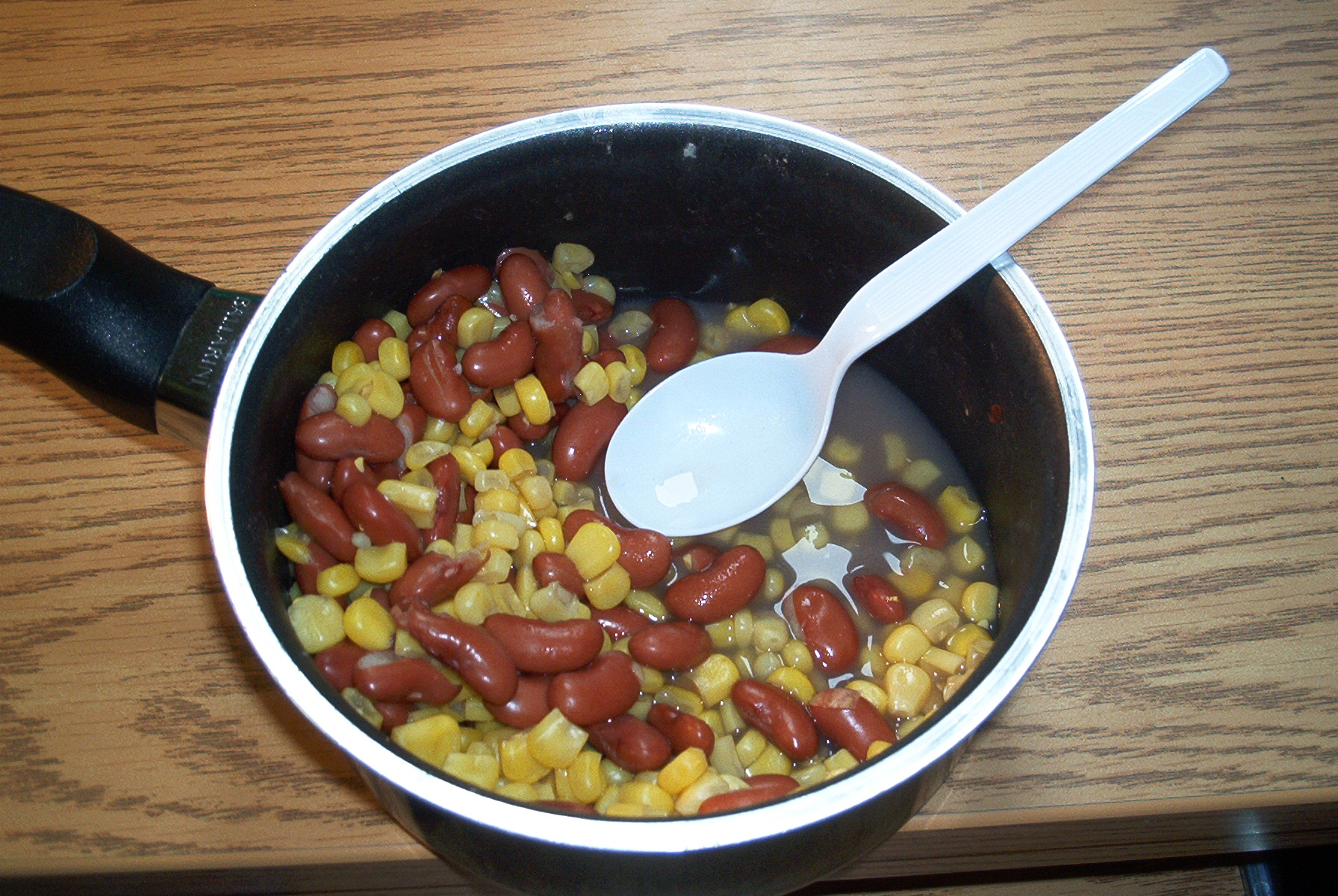
Succotash

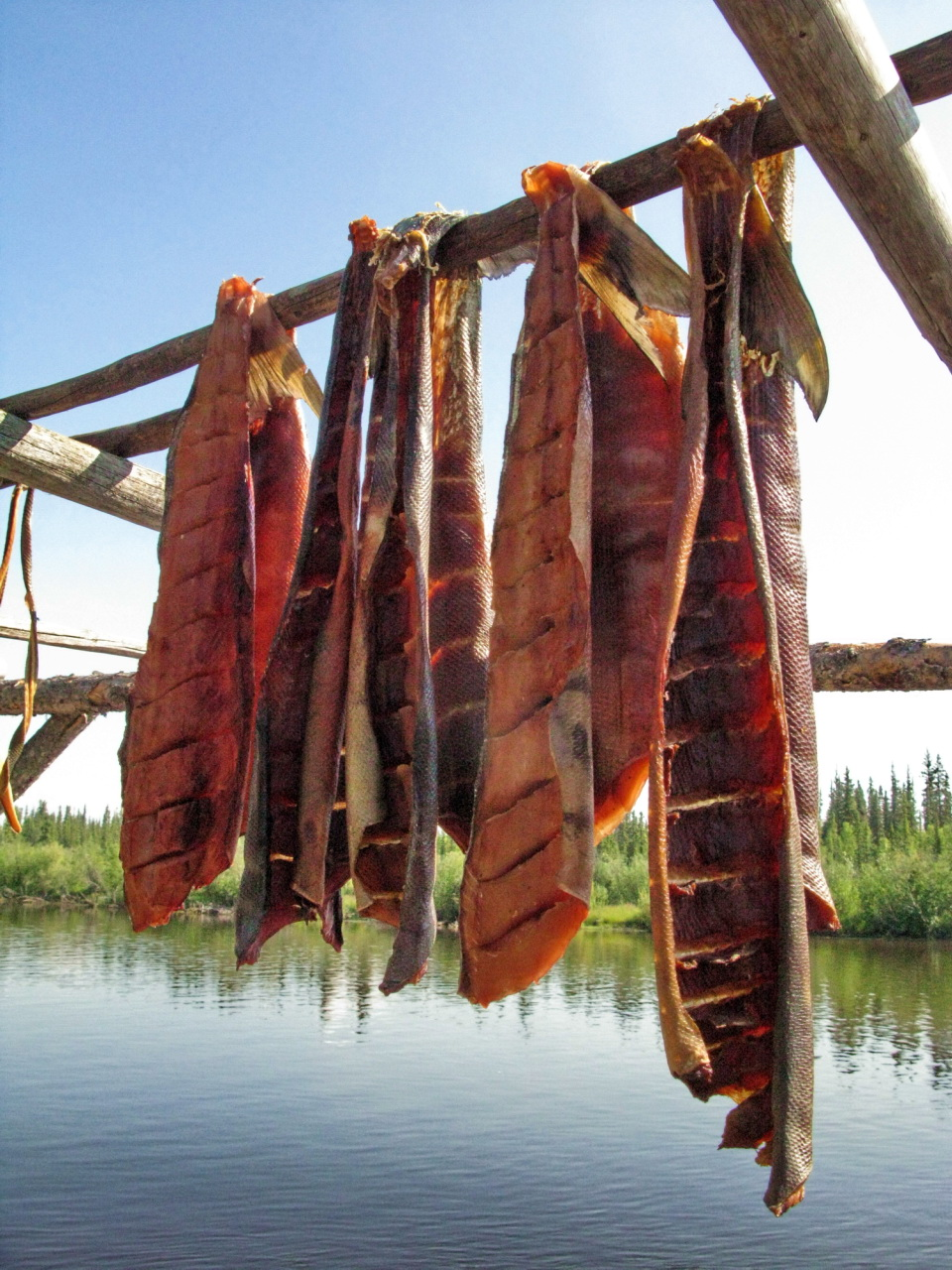
Drying salmon filets

- Acorn bread
- Acorn crepe
- Akutaq, also called "Eskimo ice cream", made from caribou or moose tallow and meat, berries, seal oil, and sometimes fish, whipped together with snow or water
- Bannock, is a type of frybread that is eaten equally in the Arctic, Plains, Sub-Arctic, and Pacific cultural areas
- Bean bread, made with corn meal and beans, popular among the Cherokee
- Bird brain stew, from the Cree nation
- Black drink or asi, a Southeastern ceremonial drink made from the yaupon holly
- Buffalo stew, from the Lakota and Cherokee people, also called tanka-me-a-lo
- Cornbread and corn pone—the word pone derives from the word for 'bread' in some Eastern Algonquian languages, such as Powhatan apon and Lenape ahpòn
- Dried meats like jerky and smoked salmon strips
- Filé powder, made from sassafras leaves, used by the Choctaw for flavoring and thickening soups and stews as well as for herbal medicine
- Frybread, a dish made from ingredients distributed to Native Americans living on reservations
- Green chili stew
- Hopi tea, an herbal tea made from Thelesperma megapotamicum
- Lu'sknikn, the Mi'kmaq form of Bannock.
- Mutton stew, from the Navajo people
- Nokake, Algonquian hoecakes, made of cornmeal
- Nut milk, from the Wabanaki
- Pemmican, a concentrated food consisting of dried pulverized meat, dried berries, and rendered fat.

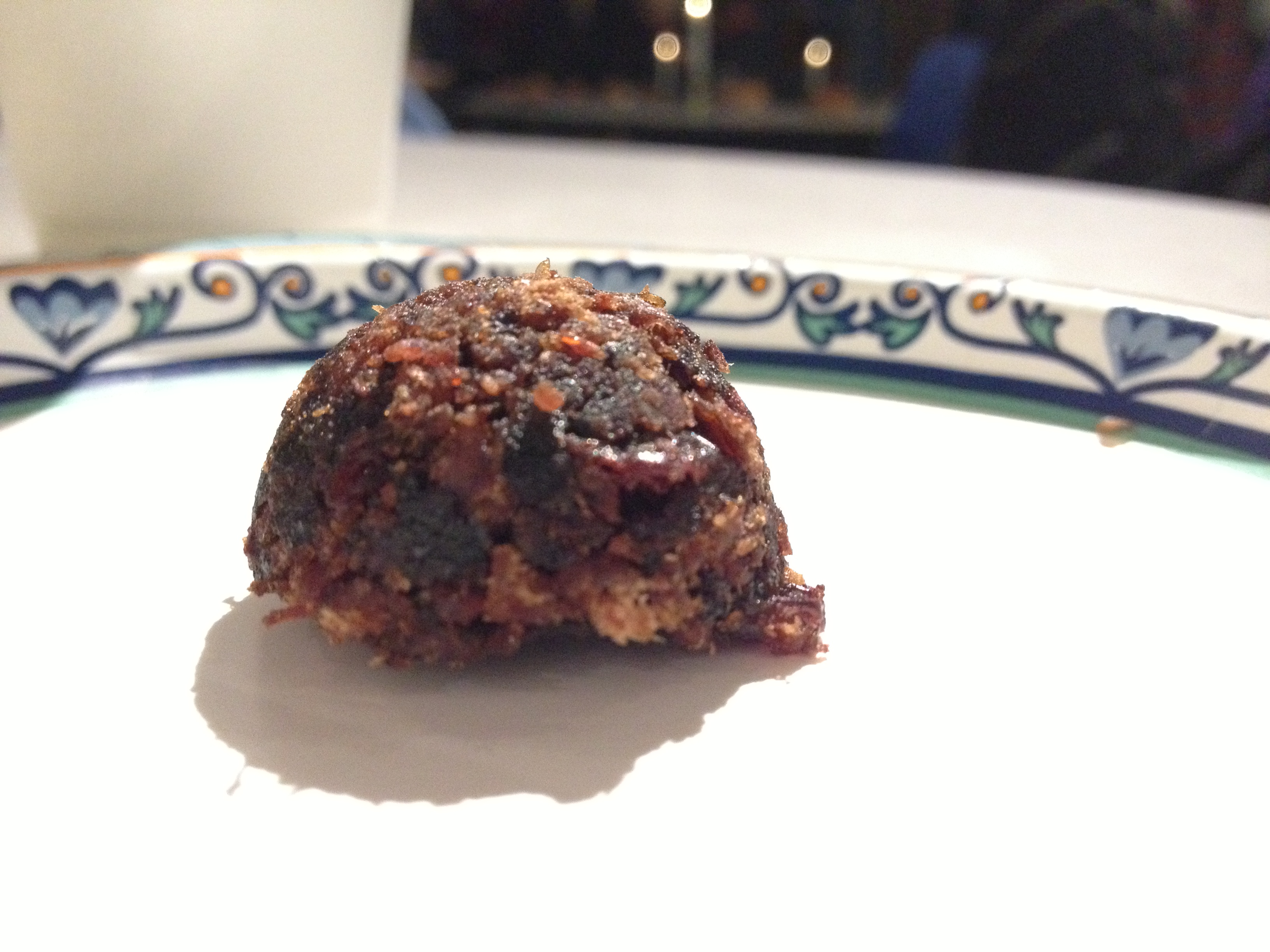
Pemmican Ball

- Piki bread, from the Hopi people
- Psindamoakan, a Lenape hunter's food made of parched cornmeal mixed with maple sugar
- Pueblo bread
- Salted salmon, an Inuit dish of brined salmon in a heavy concentration of salt water, left for months to soak up salts
- Sapan (Unami pronunciation: [ˈsaːpːən]), cornmeal mush, a staple of Lenape cuisine
- Stink fish, an Inuit dish of dried fish, kept underground until ripe, for later consumption; also done with fish heads
- Succotash, a dish of beans and corn
- Sumac lemonade, a Native American beverage made from sumac berries
- Tiswin, a term used for several fermented beverages in the Southwest, including a corn or fruit beer of the Apache and a saguaro fruit beer of the Tohono O'odham
- Walrus flipper soup, an Inuit dish made from walrus flippers
- Wiiwish, an acorn mush from the Miwok people
- Wojapi, a Plains Indian pudding of mashed, cooked berries

=== Restaurants ===
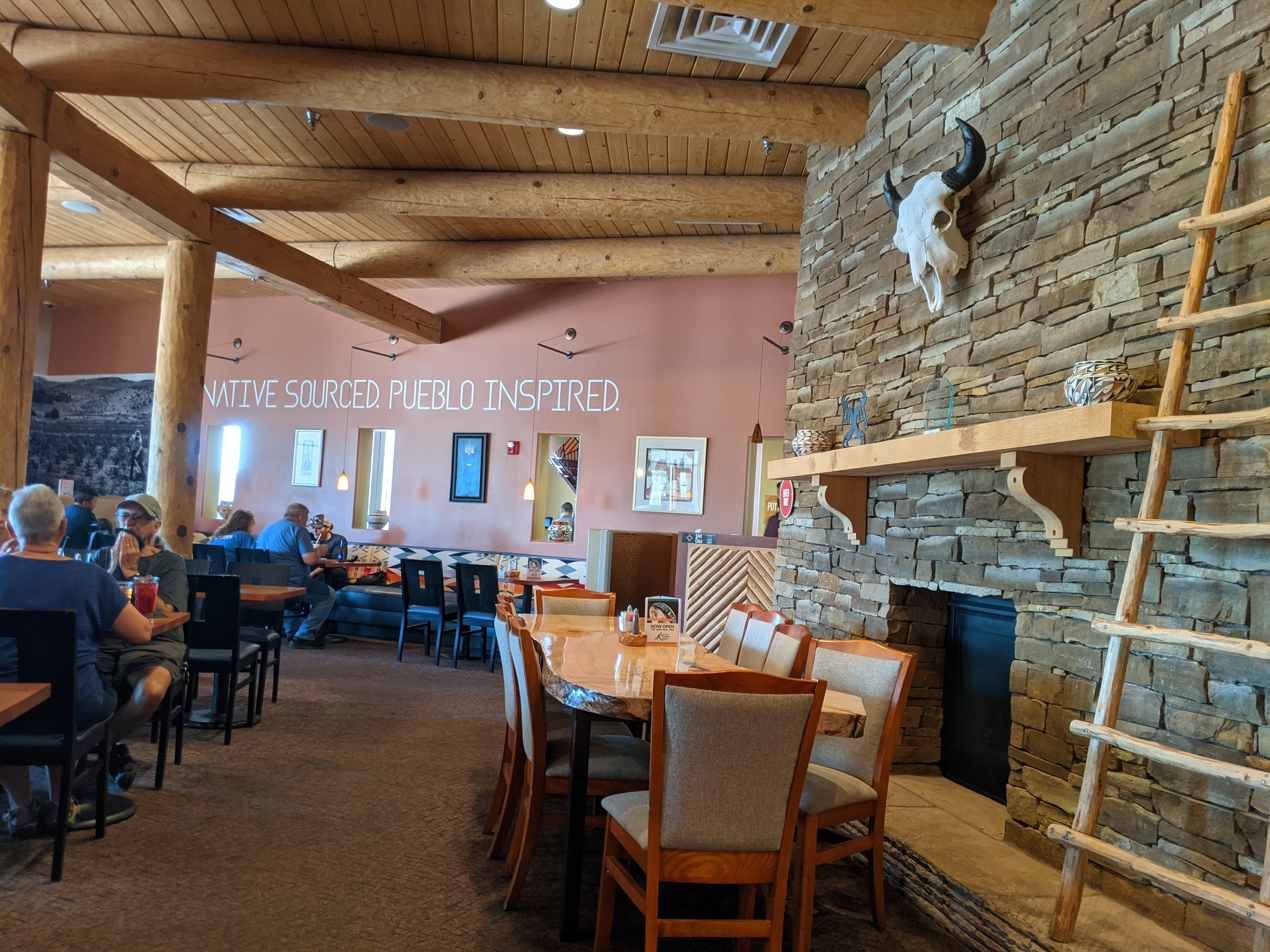
Indian Pueblo Kitchen (Albuquerque, NM)

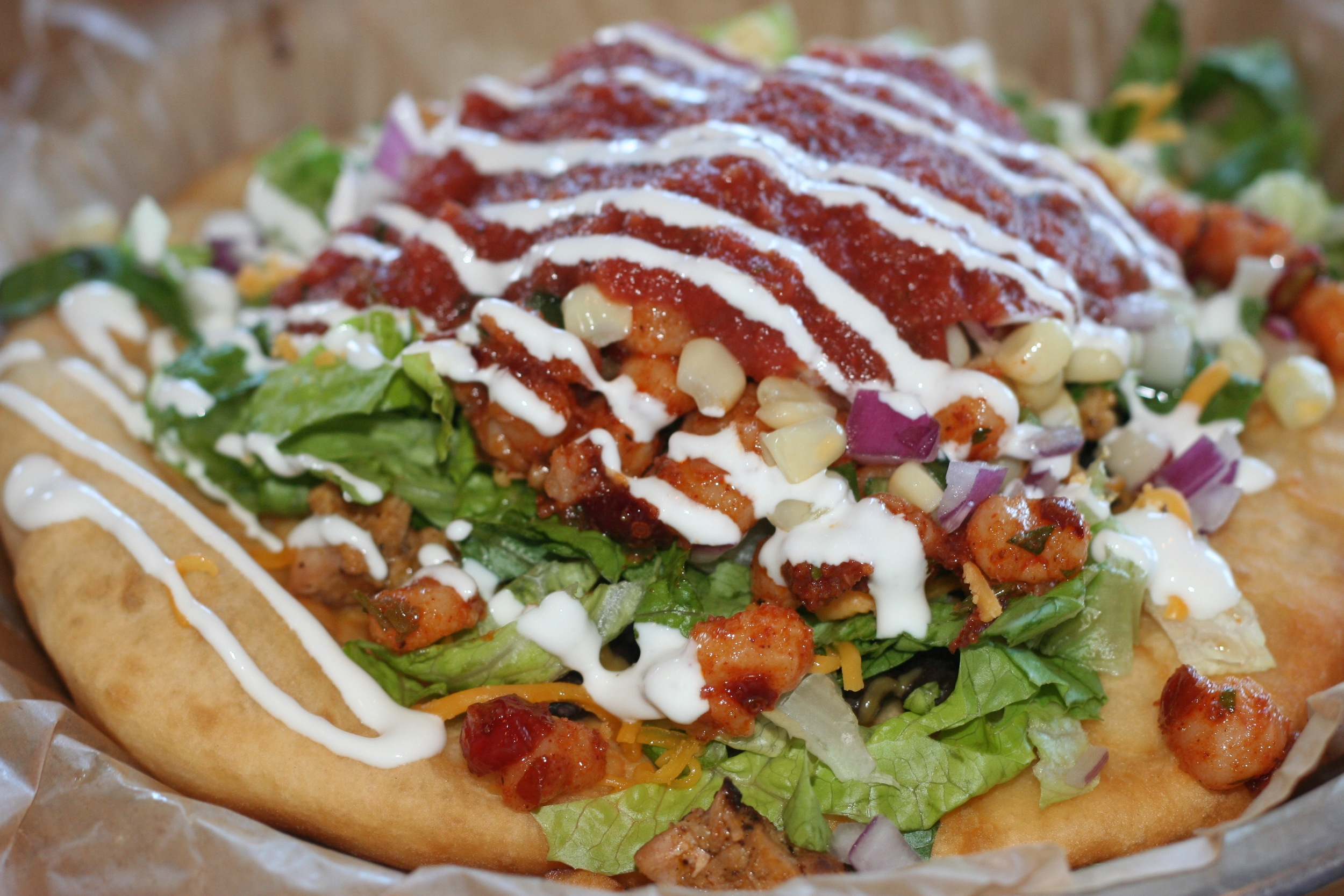
Tocabe (Denver, CO)

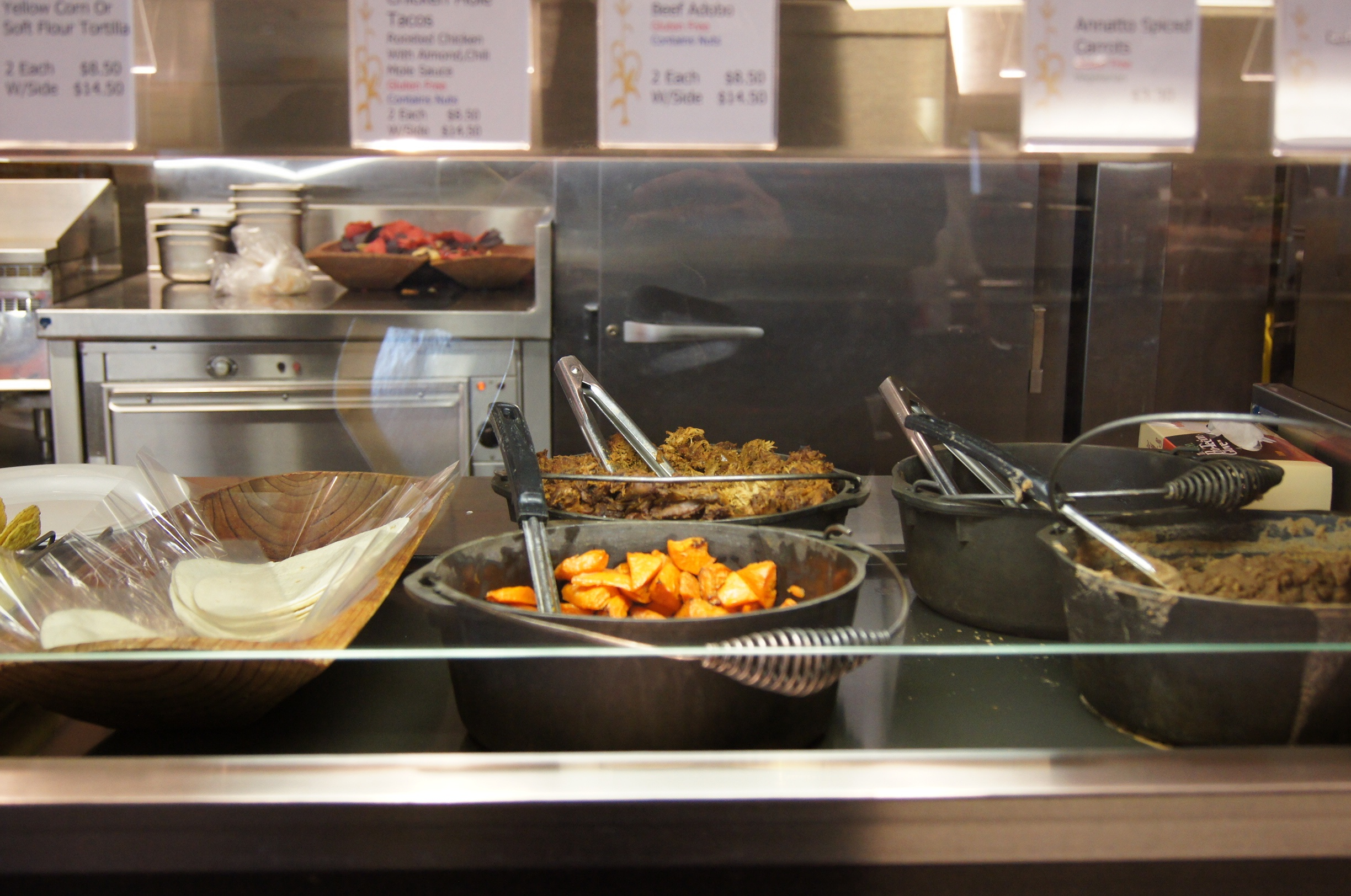
Mitsitam Native Foods Café (Washington, D.C.)

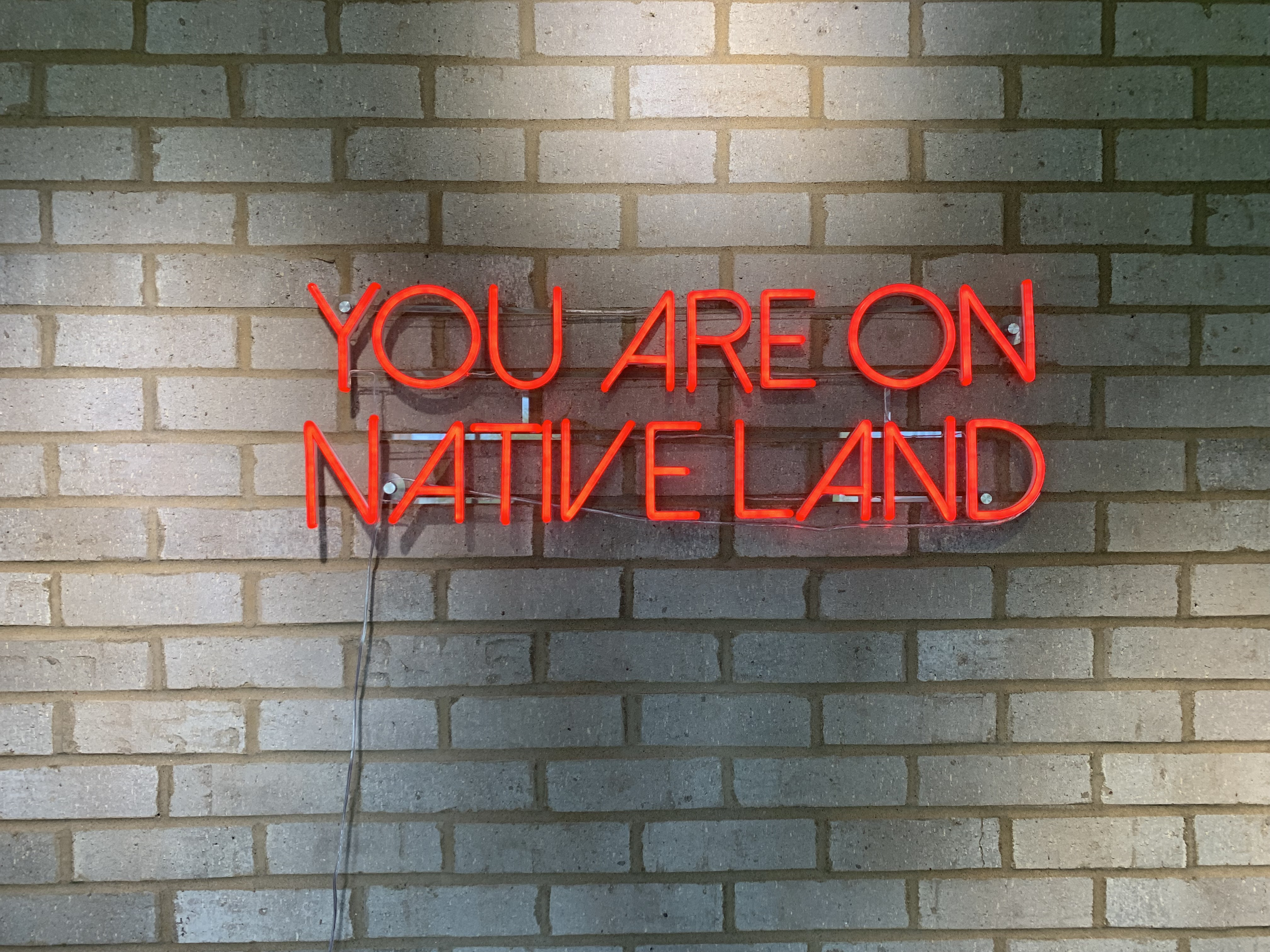
Owamni (Minneapolis, MN)

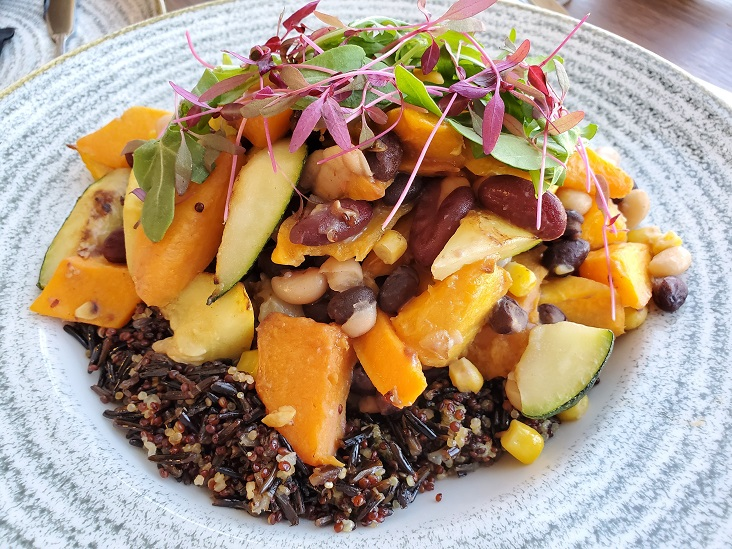
Thirty Nine Restaurant (Oklahoma City, OK)

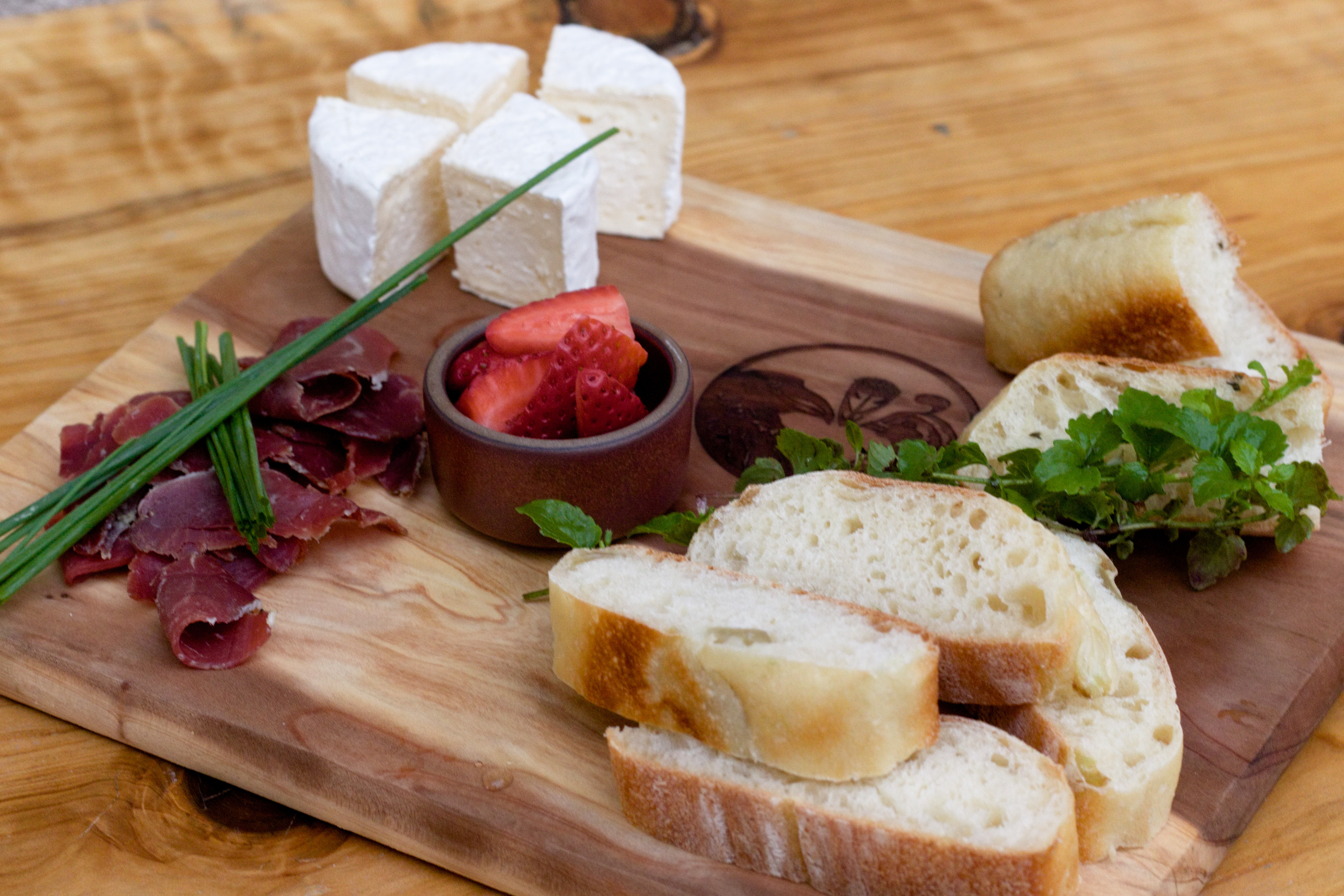
Cafe Ohlone (Berkeley, CA)

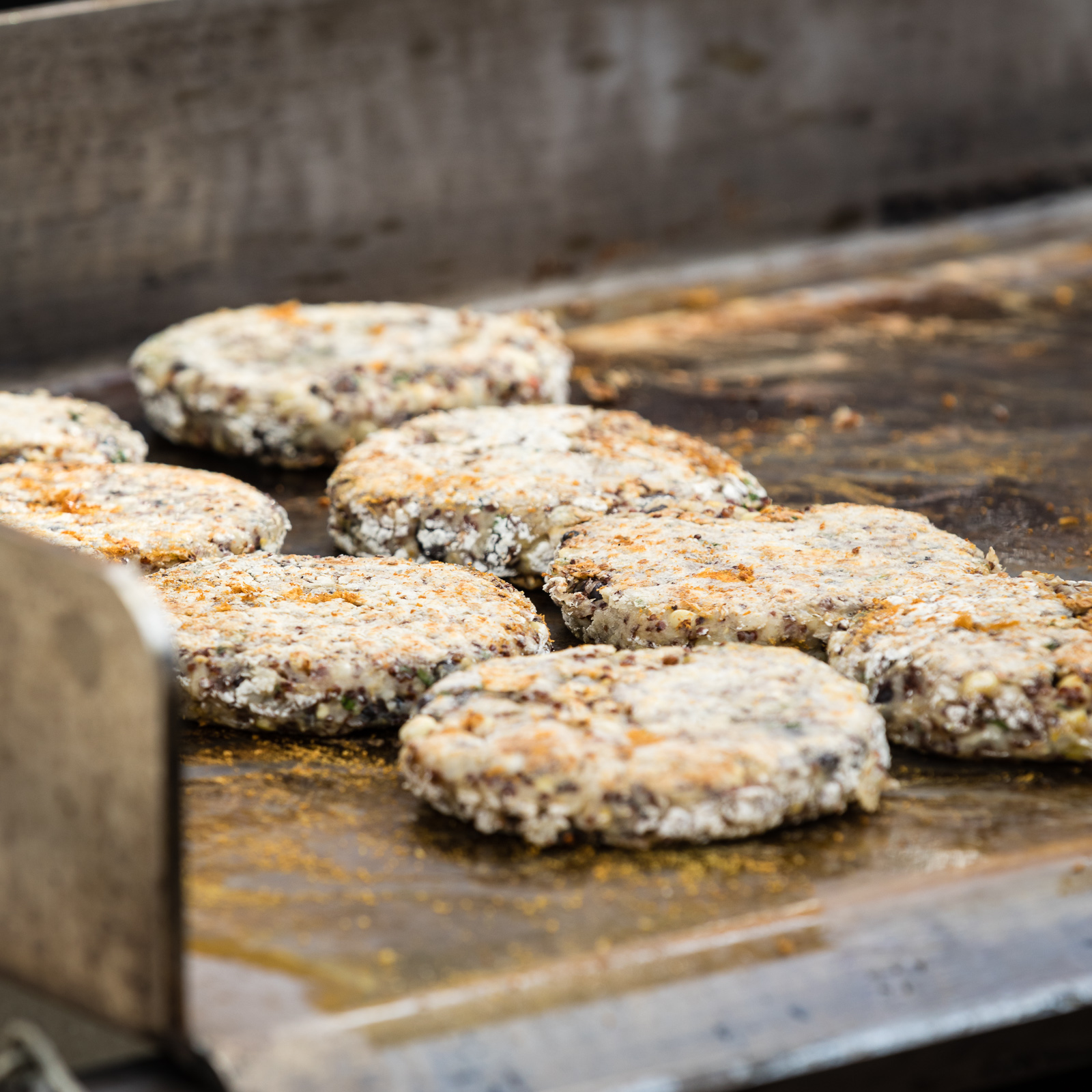
Café Gozhóó (Whiteriver, Navajo County, AZ)

== Indigenous cuisine of the Circum-Caribbean ==
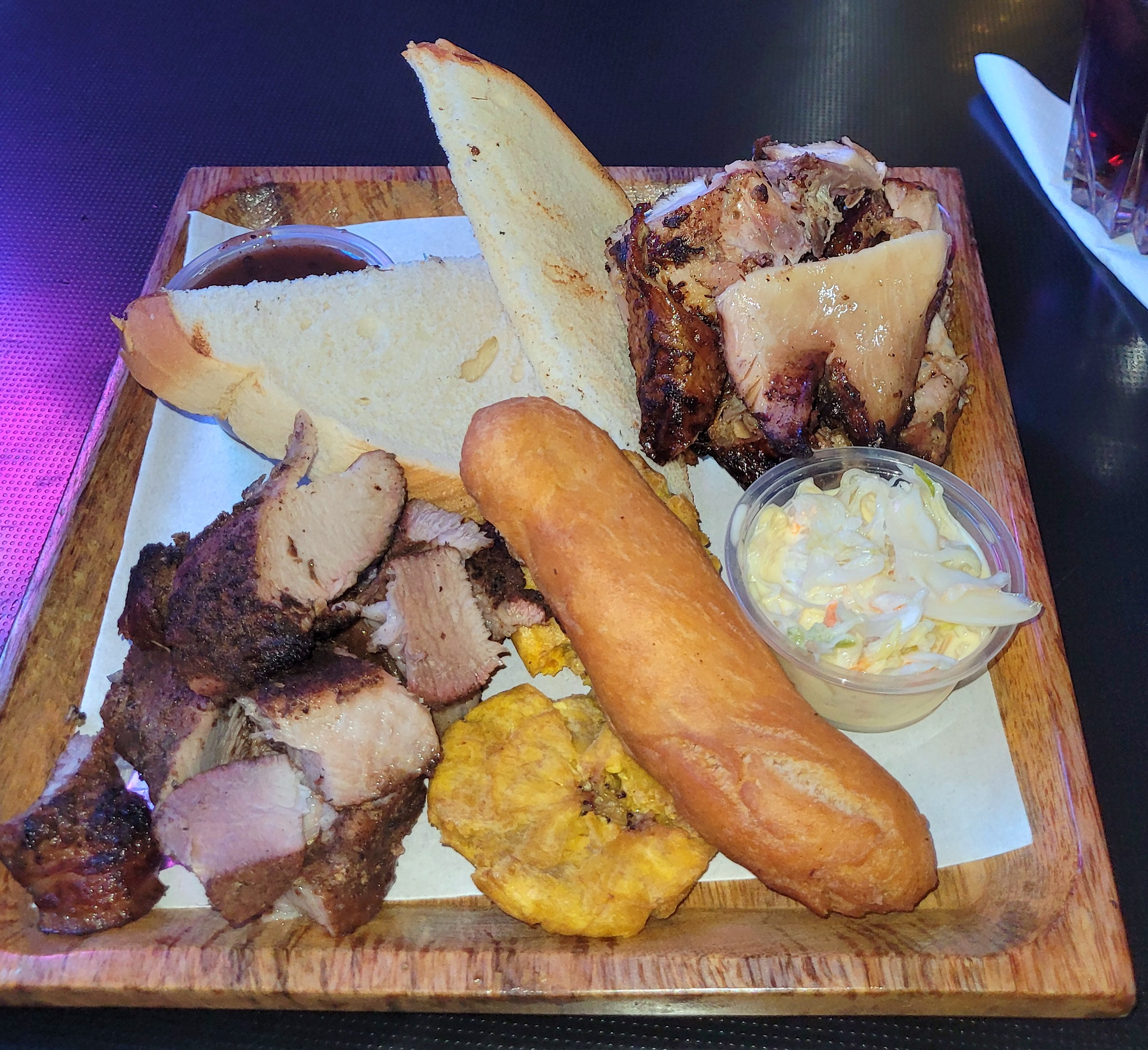
Jamaican jerk pork and chicken with festival, hard dough bread and tostone.

This region comprises the cultures of the Arawaks, the Caribs, and the Ciboney. The Taíno of the Greater Antilles were the first New World people to encounter Columbus. Prior to European contact, these groups foraged, hunted, and fished. The Taíno cultivated cassava, sweet potato, maize, beans, squash, pineapple, peanut, and peppers. Today these cultural groups have mostly assimilated into the surrounding population, but their culinary legacy lives on.

- Ajiaco, same as pepperpot, a soup believed to have originated in Cuba before Columbus' arrival. The soup mixes a variety of meats, tubers, and peppers.
- Barbacoa, the origin of the English word barbecue, a method of slow-grilling meat over a fire pit.
- Jerk, a style of cooking meat that originated with the Taíno of Jamaica. Meat was applied with a dry rub of allspice, Scotch bonnet pepper, and perhaps additional spices, before being smoked over fire or wood charcoal.
- Casabe, a crispy, thin flatbread made from cassava root widespread in the Pre-Columbian Caribbean and Amazonia.
- Bammy, a Jamaican flatbread of Taíno origin, made from cassava. It is a variation of casabe, which is steamed or fried and typically eaten with fish or seafood.
- Jamaican pepperpot soup, a rich soup of Taíno origin, made with callaloo, salted meats, seafood, coconut milk, vegetables, root vegetables (cassava, sweet potato, cocoyam etc.) herbs and spices like pimento and peppers (usually Scotch bonnet).
- Guanime, a Puerto Rican food similar to the tamale; made with cornmeal or cornmeal and mashed cassave together.
- Pasteles, a dish that may have also been called hallaca and originated from Puerto Rico. Pasteles were once made with cassava and taro mashed into a masa onto a taro leaf. They are then stuffed with meat and wrapped.
- Funche or fungi, a cornmeal mush.
- Cassareep, a sauce, condiment, or thickening agent made by boiling down the extracted juices of bitter cassava root.
- Mama Juana, a tea made in Hispaniola (Dominican Republic and Haiti).
- Pepperpot, a spicy stew of Taíno origin based on meat, vegetables, chili peppers, and boiled-down cassava juice, with a legacy stretching from Cuba, Colombia coast and to Guyana.
- Bush teas, popular as herbal remedies in the Virgin Islands and other parts of the Caribbean, often derived from Indigenous sources, such as ginger thomas, soursop, inflammation bush, kenip, wormgrass, worry wine, and many other leaves, barks, and herbs.
- Ouicou, a fermented, cassava-based beer brewed by the Caribs of the Lesser Antilles.
- Taumali or taumalin, a Carib sauce made from the green liver meat of lobsters, chile pepper, and lime juice.

== Indigenous cuisine of Mesoamerica ==
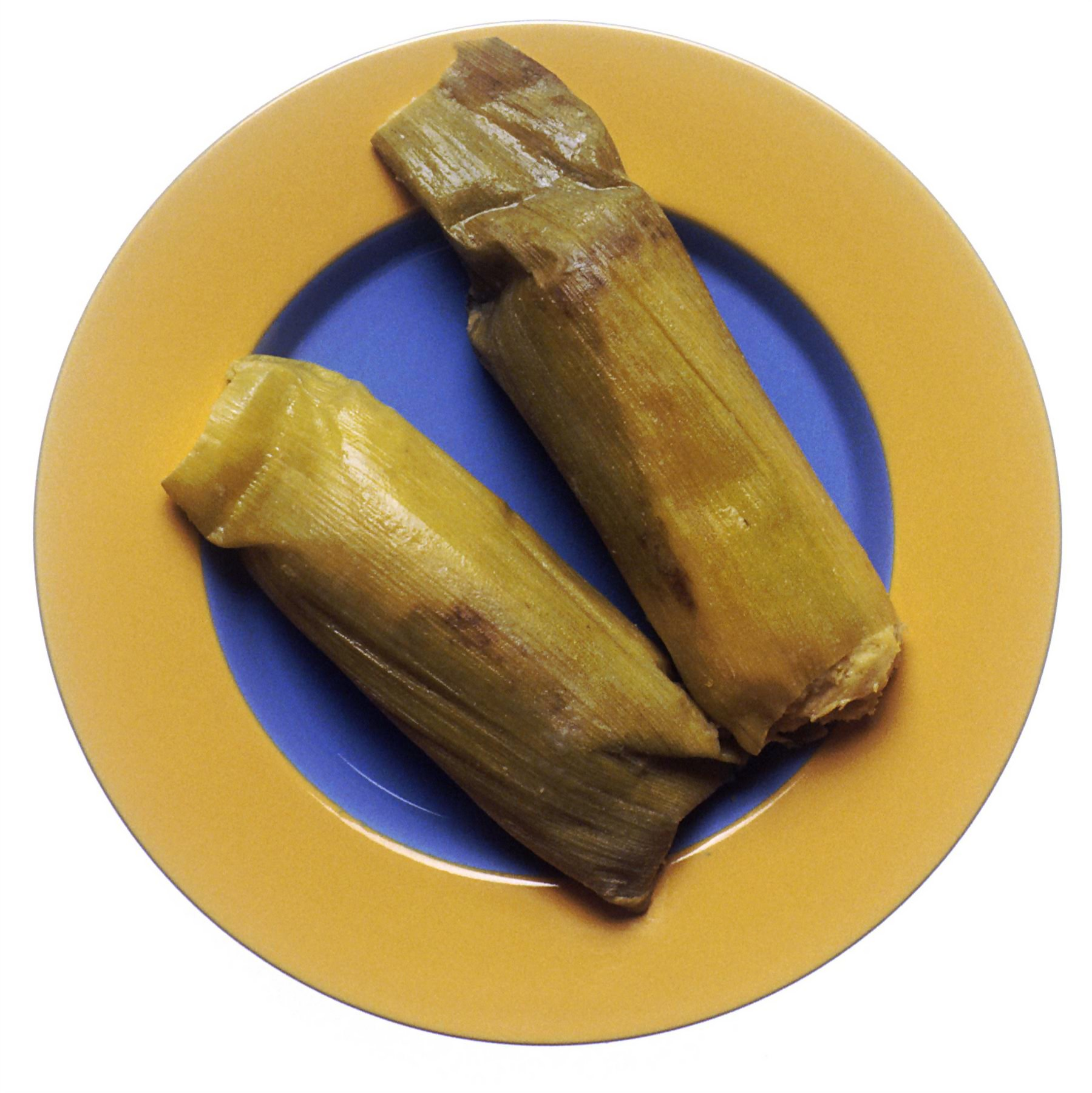
Tamales

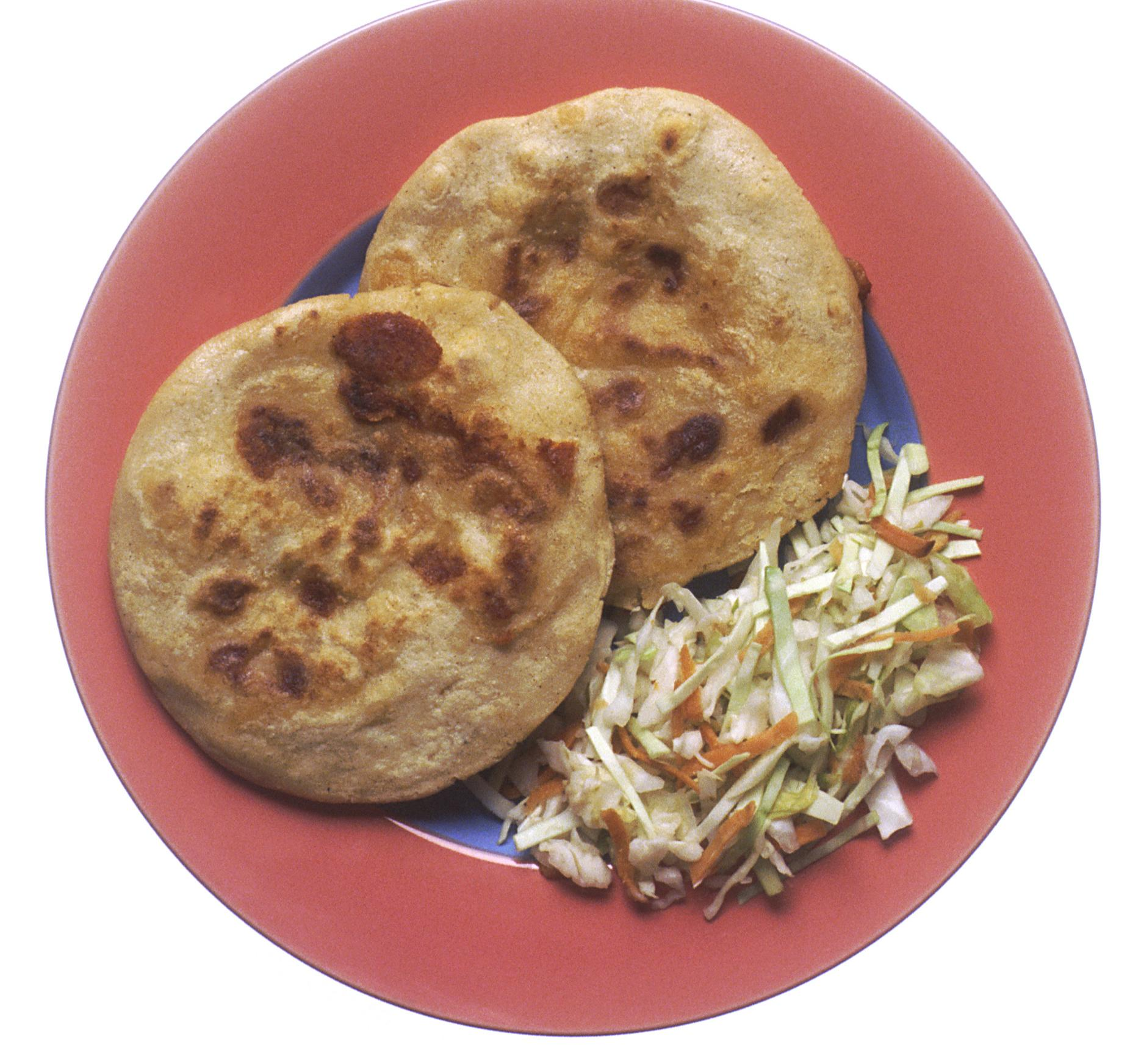
Pupusas

The pre-conquest cuisine of the Indigenous peoples of Mesoamerica made a major contribution to shaping modern-day Mexican cuisine, Belizean cuisine, Salvadoran cuisine, Honduran cuisine, Guatemalan cuisine. The cultures involved included the Aztec, Maya, Olmec, Pipil and many more (see the List of pre-Columbian civilizations).

=== Some known dishes ===
- Alegría, a candy made from puffed amaranth and boiled-down honey or maguey sap, in ancient times formed into the shapes of Aztec gods
- Balché, Mayan fermented honey drink
- Champurrado, a chocolate drink
- Chili
- Corn tortillas
- Guacamole
- Huarache
- Mezcal
- Mole
- Pejelagarto, a fish with an alligator-like head seasoned with amashito chile and lime
- Pozole
- Pulque or octli, an alcoholic beverage of fermented maguey juice
- Pupusas, thick cornmeal flatbread from the Pipil culture of El Salvador
- Salsa
- Tacos
- Tamales
- Tepache, pineapple beer
- Tlacoyos (gordita)
- Xocolātl, chocolate

== Indigenous cuisine of South America ==
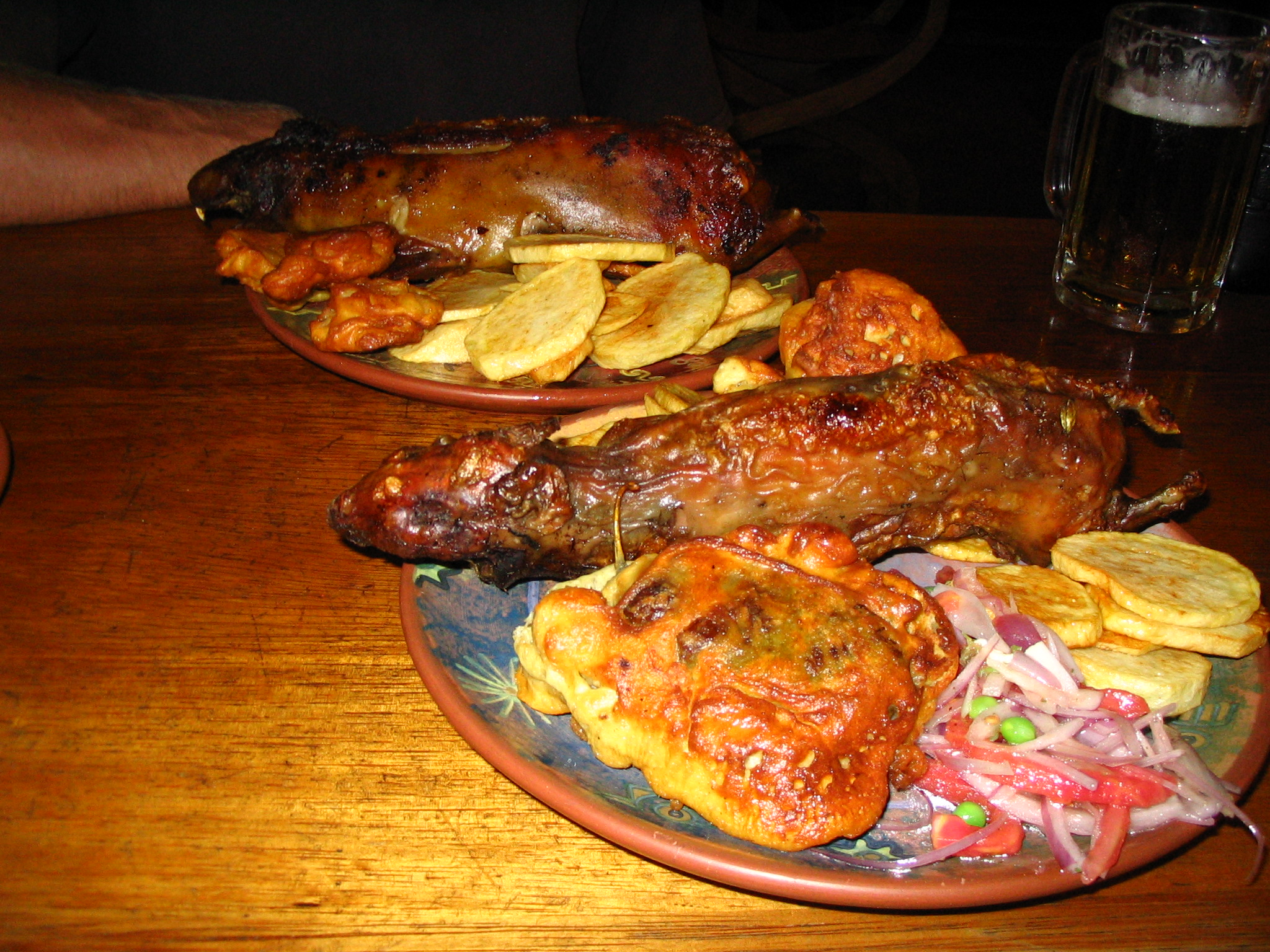
Roast guinea pig (cuy)

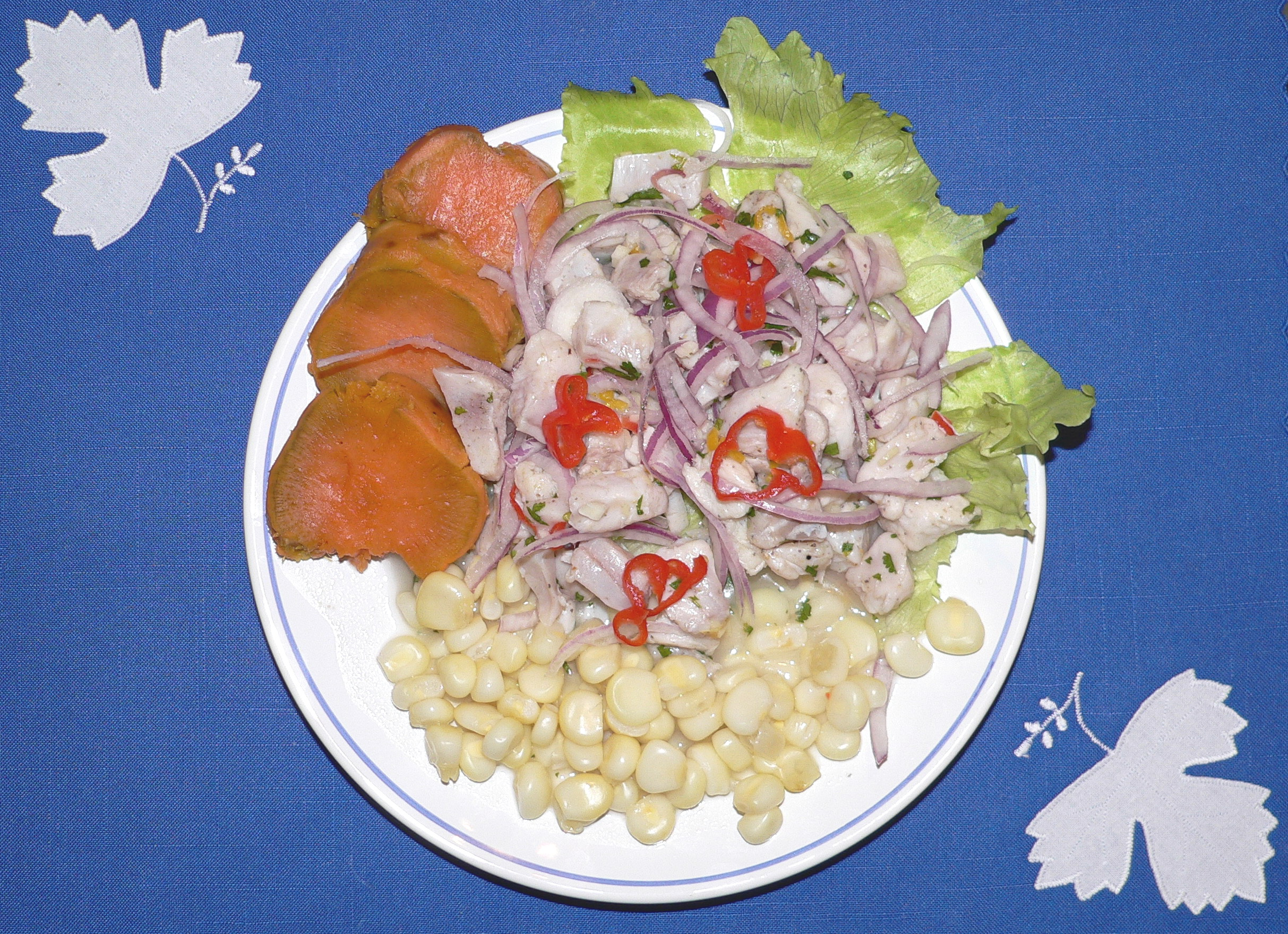
Ceviche

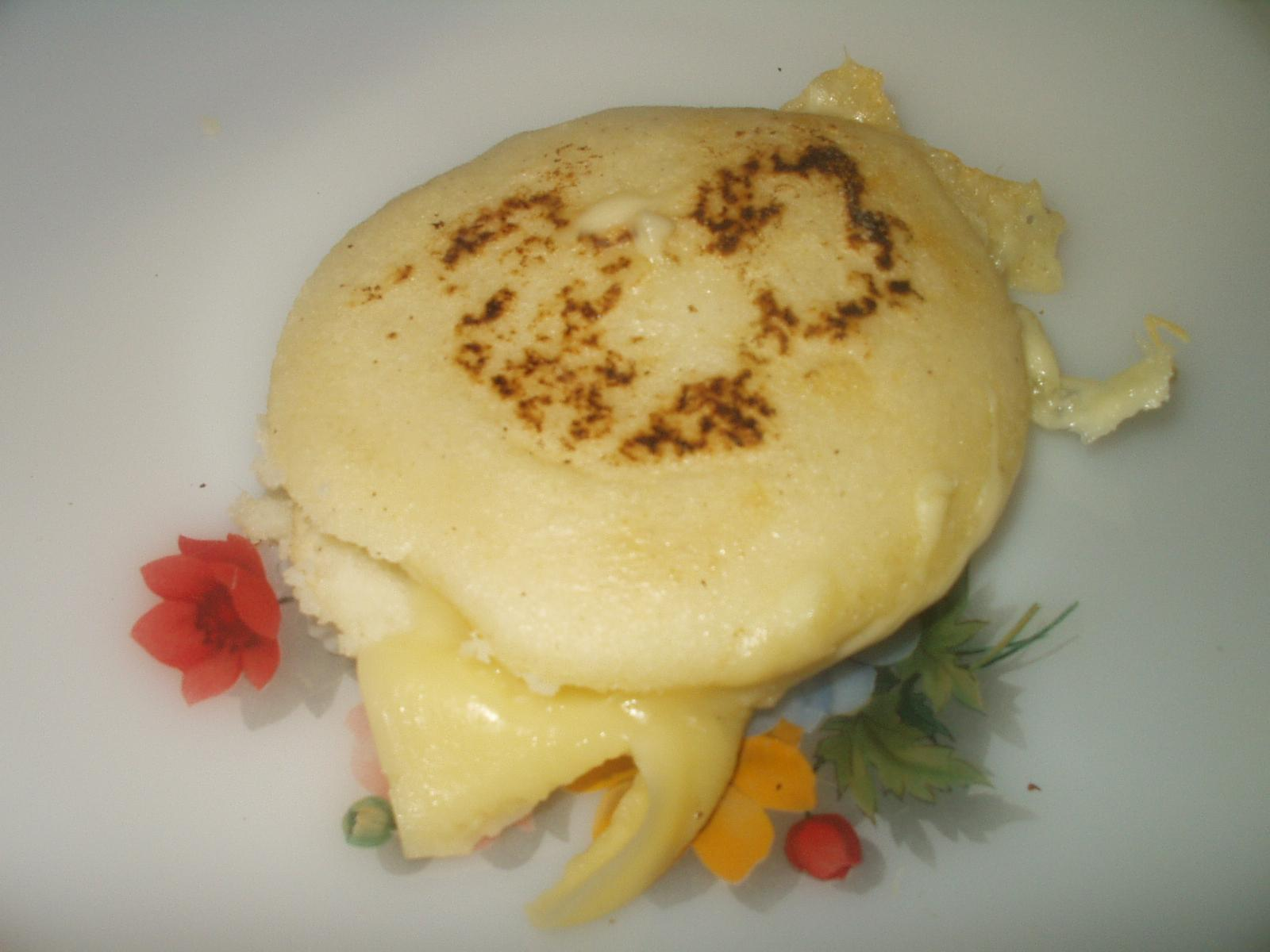
Cheese-filled arepa

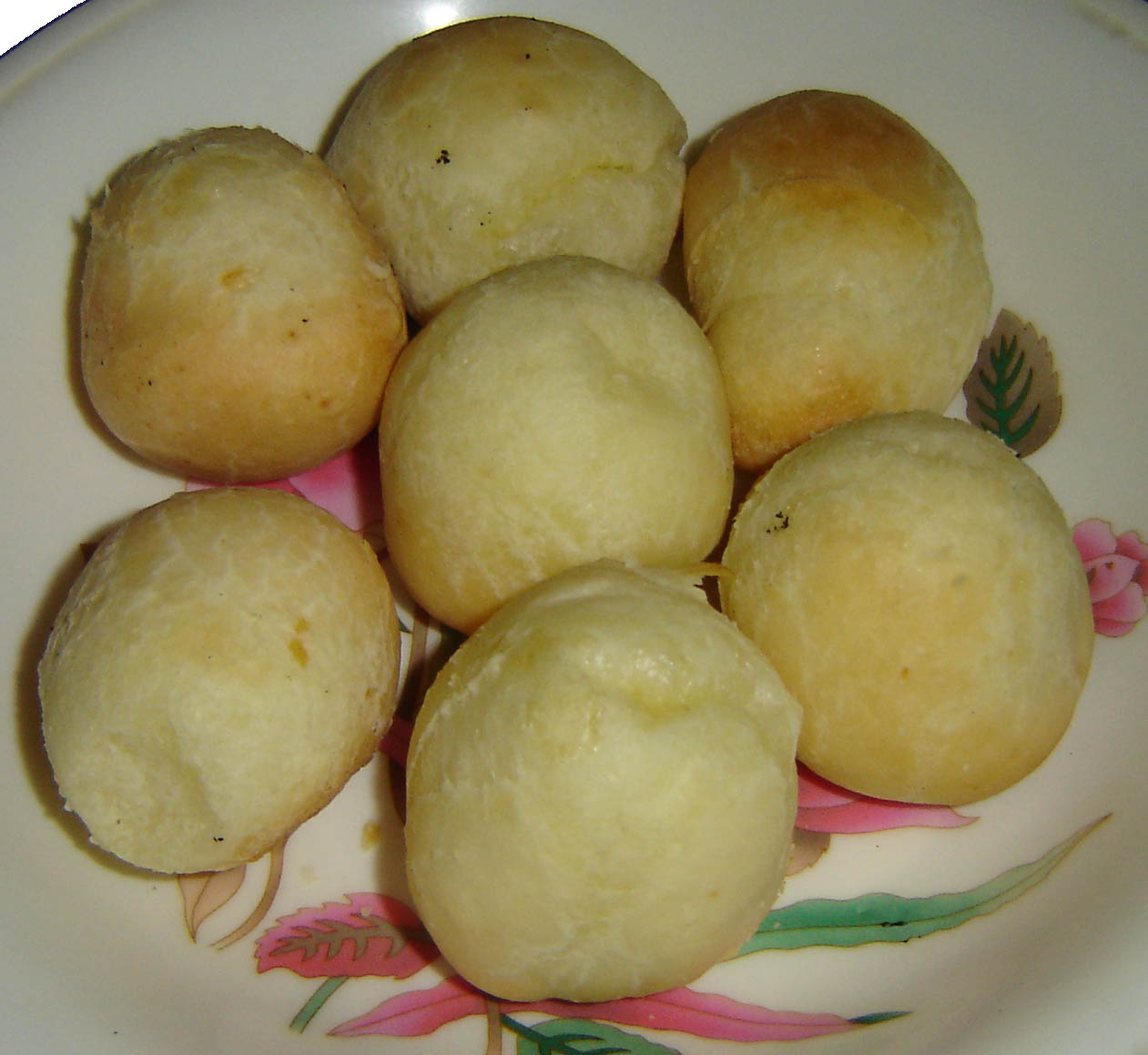
Chipa, cheese bread

=== Andean cultures ===
This currently includes recipes known from the Quechua, Aymara and Nazca of the Andes.

- Grilled guinea pig, a native to most of the Andes region, this small rodent has been cultivated for at least 4000 years.
- Fried green tomatoes, a nightshade relative native to Peru.
- Saraiaka, a corn liquor.
- Chicha, a generic name for any number of Indigenous beers found in South America. Though chichas made from various types of corn are the most common in the Andes, chicha in the Amazon Basin frequently use manioc. Variations found throughout the continent can be based on amaranth, quinoa, peanut, potato, coca, and many other ingredients.
- Chicha morada, a Peruvian, sweet, unfermented drink made from purple corn, fruits, and spices.
- Colada morada, a thickened, spiced fruit drink based on the Andean blackberry, traditional to the Day of the Dead ceremonies held in Ecuador, it is typically served with guagua de pan, a bread shaped like a swaddled infant (formerly made from cornmeal in Pre-Columbian times), though other shapes can be found in various regions.
- Quinoa porridge.
- Ch'arki, a type of dried meat.
- Humitas, similar to modern-day tamales, a thick mixture of corn, herbs and onion, cooked in a corn-leaf wrapping. The name is modern, meaning bow-tie, because of the shape in which it's wrapped.
- Locro (from the Quechua ruqru) is a hearty thick stew popular along the Andes mountain range. It is one of the national dishes of Argentina and Bolivia.
- Mazamorra morada, a thick, sweet pudding made from ground purple corn and fruit. Sold in mix form in Peru.
- Mate de coca, a Peruvian tea made from steeped coca leaves. It is commonly sipped by Indigenous people living at high altitudes in the Andes to prevent elevation illnesses.
- Pachamanca, stew cooked in a hautía oven.
- Papa a la Huancaína, Peruvian potatoes covered in a spicy, peanut-based sauce called Huancaína (Wan-ka-EE-na) sauce.
- Patasca, spicy stew made from boiled maize, potatoes, and dried meat.
- Ceviche, raw fish marinated in lime juice. One of Peru's national dishes.
- Cancha or tostada, fried golden hominy.
- Llajwa, salsa of Bolivia.
- Llapingachos, mashed-potato cakes from Ecuador.
- Tocosh (togosh), a traditional Quechua food prepared from fermented potato pulp.

=== Other South American cultures ===
- Angu, an Indigenous Brazilian type of corn mush.
- Arepa, a maize-based bread originating from the Indigenous peoples of Colombia and Venezuela.
- Vori vori, a Paraguayan soup with cornmeal dumplings.
- Cauim, a fermented beverage based on maize or manioc broken down by the enzymes of human saliva, traditional to the Tupinambá and other Indigenous peoples of Brazil.
- Chipa, a wide variety of corn flour or manioc-based breads traditional to Paraguay.
- Curanto, a Chilean stew cooked in an earthen oven originally from the Chono people of Chiloé Island.
- Kaguyjy, a Guarani-derived locro corn mush that become part of the national Paraguayan cuisine.
- Kiveve, a sweet or savory dish from Paraguay consisting of puréed pumpkin and other ingredients cooked over a fire.
- Lampreado or payaguá mascada, a starchy, manioc-based fried cake from Paraguay and the northeast of Argentina.
- Lapacho or taheebo, a medicinal tree-bark infusion.
- Maniçoba, dish of boiled manioc leaves and smoked meat indigenous to the Brazilian Amazon.
- Mate (beverage).
- Mbeju, a pan-cooked cake utilizing manioc starch.
- Merken, an ají powder from the Mapuche of Patagonia.
- Mocotó, a Brazilian stew with cow's feet, beans, and vegetables.
- Moqueca, a Brazilian seafood stew.
- Paçoca, from the Tupi "to crumble," describes two different dishes of pulverized ingredients: one with peanuts and sugar, and the other with dried meat, ground manioc, and onion.
- Pamonha, a Brazilian tamale.
- Pira caldo, Paraguayan fish soup.
- Sopa paraguaya, a corn-flour casserole esteemed as the national dish of Paraguay, related to chipa guasu.
- Soyo, shortened from the Guarani name so’o josopy, a Paraguayan soup based on meat crushed in a mortar.
- Tacacá, a Brazilian stew of tucupi, jambu leaves, and shrimp, typically served in a dried gourd.
- Tereré or ka'ay, a cold-brewed version of yerba mate.
- Tucupi, manioc-based broth used in Brazilian dishes such as pato no tucupi and tacacá.
- Yerba mate, a tea made from the holly of the same name, derived from Guaraní.

== Cooking utensils ==
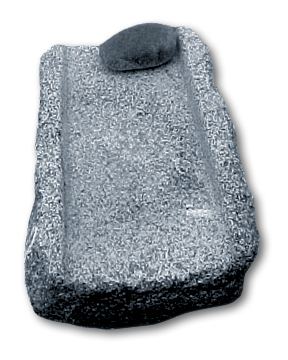
Metate and mano

The earliest utensils, including bowls, knives, spoons, grinders, and griddles, were made from all kinds of materials, such as rock and animal bone. Gourds were also initially cultivated, hollowed, and dried to be used as bowls, spoons, ladles, and storage containers.

Many Indigenous cultures also developed elaborate ceramics for making bowls and cooking pots, and basketry for making containers. Nobility in the Andean and Mesoamerican civilizations were even known to have utensils and vessels smelted from gold, silver, copper, or other minerals.

- Batan, an Andean grinding slab used in conjunction with a small stone uña
- Burén, a clay griddle used by the Taíno.
- Comal, a griddle used since pre-Columbian times in Mexico and Central America for a variety of purposes, especially to cook tortillas.
- Cuia, a gourd used for drinking mate in South America.
- Metate, a stone grinding slab used with a stone mano or metlapil to process meal in Mesoamerica and one of the most notable Pre-Columbian artifacts in Costa Rica.
- Molinillo, a device used by Mesoamerican royalty for frothing cacao drinks.
- Molcajete, a basalt stone bowl, used with a tejolote to grind ingredients as a Mesoamerican form of mortar and pestle.
- Paila, an Andean earthenware bowl.
- Cooking baskets were woven from a variety of local fibers and sometimes coated with clay to improve durability. The notable thing about basket cooking and some native clay pot cooking is that the heat source, i.e. hot stones or charcoal, is used inside the utensil rather than outside. (Also see Cookware and bakeware.)

== Crops and ingredients ==
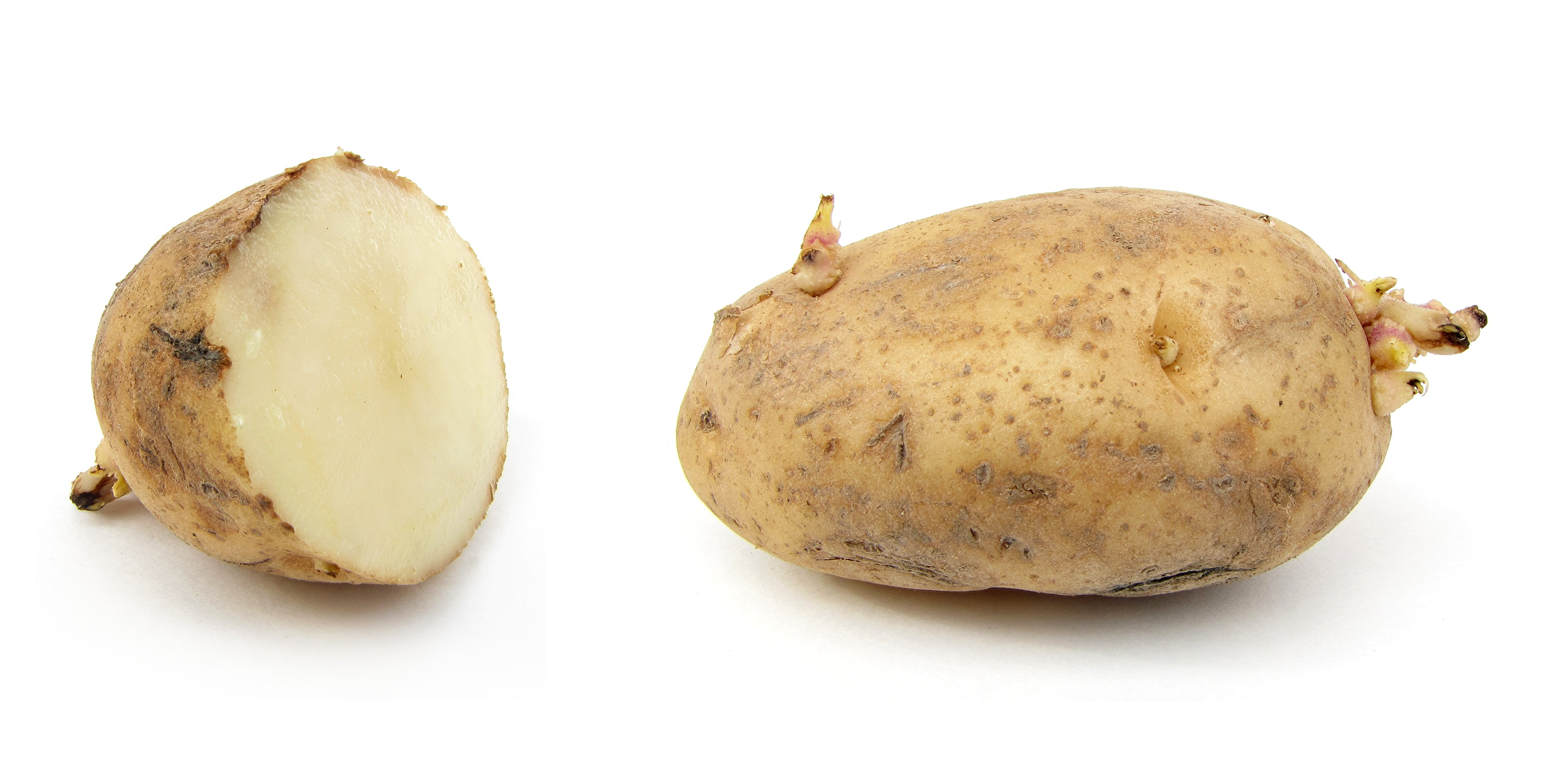
A russet potato with sprouts

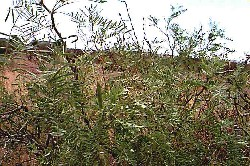
The bean pods of the mesquite (above) can be dried and ground into flour, adding a sweet, nutty taste to breads

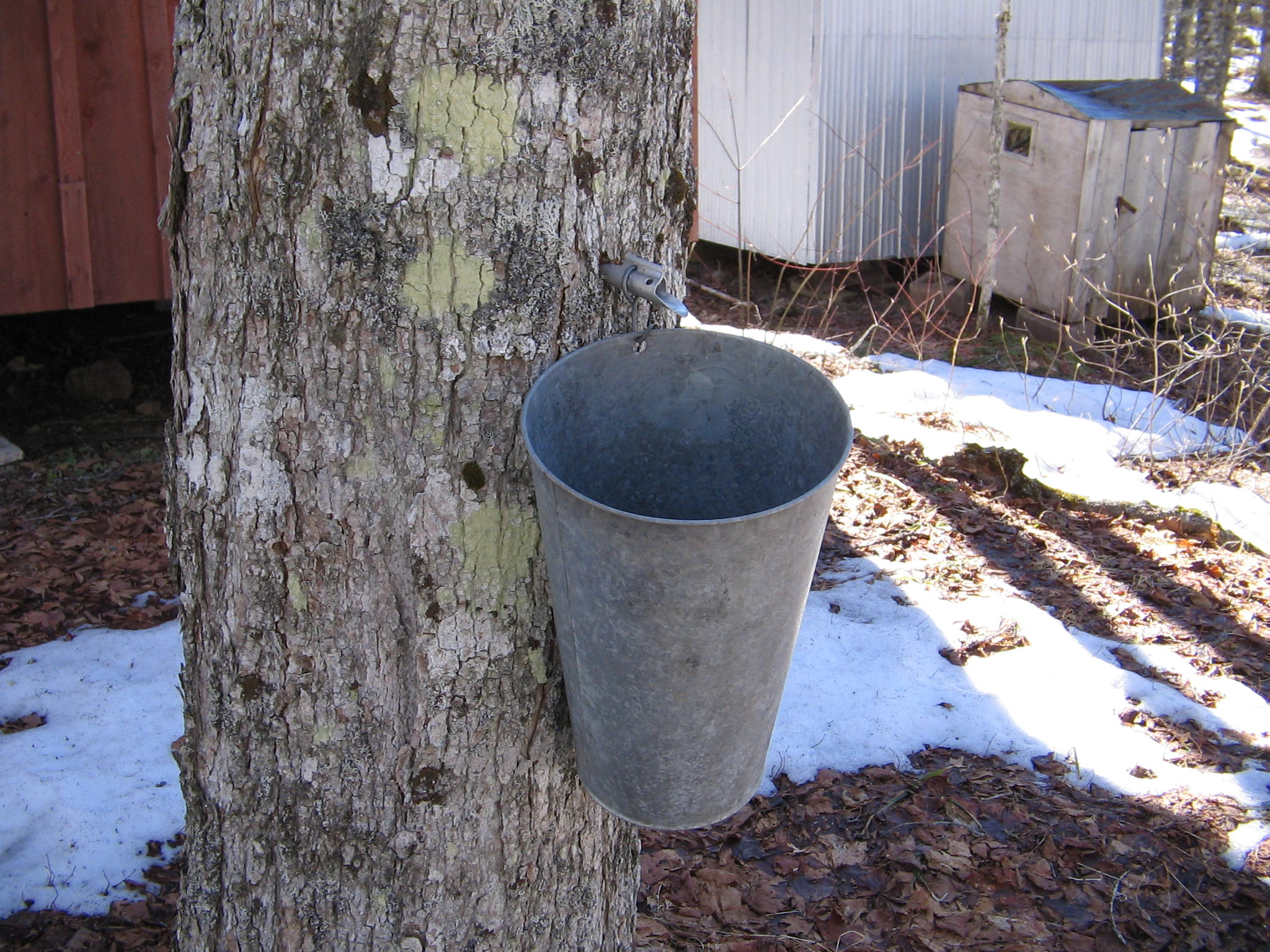
A maple syrup tap

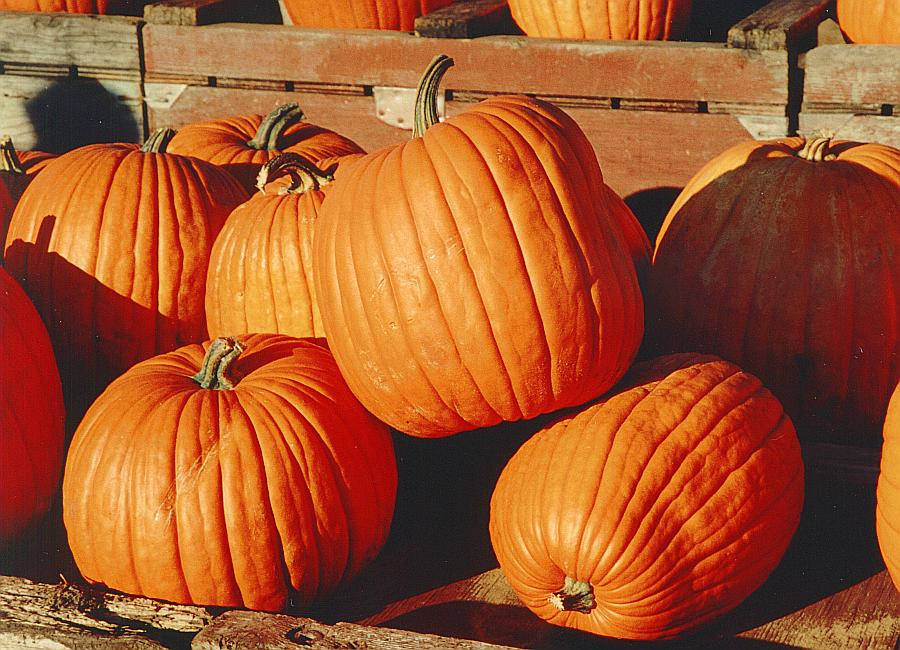
Several large pumpkins

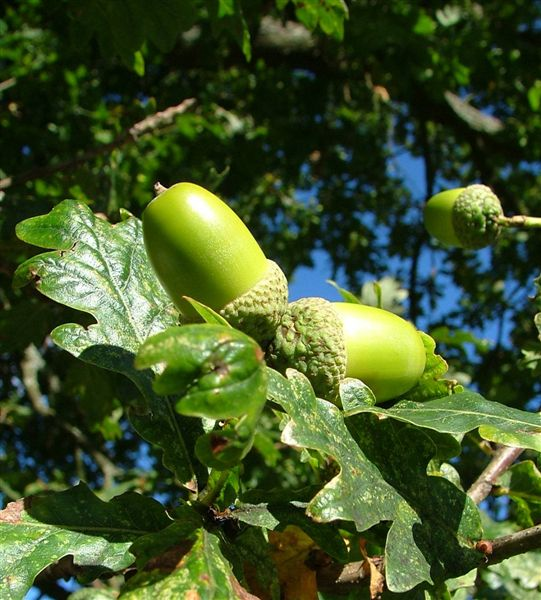
Acorns of sessile oak. The acorn, or oak nut, is the nut of the oaks and their close relatives (genera Quercus and Lithocarpus, in the family Fagaceae).

=== Plant-based foods ===
- Acorn, used to make flour and fertilizers for plants
- Achira, edible tubercule
- Achiote, annatto seed, seasoning
- Acuyo, seasoning
- Agarita, berries
- Agave nectar, sweetener
- Allspice, seasoning
- Amaranth, grain
- American chestnut
- Arazá
- American lotus, seeds and root, leaves for baking coverings
- Amole, can include Chlorogalum and Agave schottii
- Aspen, inner bark and sap, used as sweetener)
- Avocado
- Barbados cherry or acerola
- Beans
- Bear grass
- Beautyberry
- Beech nuts
- Birch bark
- Birch syrup, sweetener
- Bitterroot
- Blackberries
- Blow wife seeds
- Blueberries
- Bodark seeds, also called Osage orange, hedge apple, monkeybrain
- Bog rosemary, poisonous but leaves can be brewed into tea
- Box elder, inner bark (used as sweetener)
- Buckeye, nuts can be eaten after they are removed and roasted to remove tannins
- Butia, palm fruits from South America
- Buffalo gourd, wild ancestor of all squash/pumpkin
- Bur cucumber
- Cacao
- Cactus (various species), fruits and young pads (see nopales)
- California poppy seeds (There are eastern American poppies also, but they are believed to have always been so rare, inclusion in the human diet is highly unlikely)
- Camas root
- Canella winterana, white cinnamon (used as a seasoning before cinnamon was imported to the Americas)
- Cashew, nuts
- Cassava, South America
- Cattails, roots, pollen
- Century plant (mescal or agave)—crowns (tuberous base portion) and shoots
- Chia seed
- Chicle, chewing gum
- Chili peppers (including bell peppers)—seasoning
- Cherimoya
- Chokecherries
- Cholla fruits
- Coca, Andes
- Cow parsnip root
- Cranberries
- Crowberry
- Culantro, used as a seasoning before cilantro
- Currants
- Custard-apple
- Dandelion
- Datil, fruit and flowers
- Devil's claw
- Dewberry
- Dropseed grasses (various varieties), seeds
- Dwarf plantain
- Eastern redbud, flowers as spice, fruit
- Eastern red columbine, nectar only
- Elderberries
- Emory oak, acorns
- Epazote, seasoning
- Feijoa, fruit from South America
- Ferns (various edible species, such as Fiddlehead fern)
- Gaylussacias or black huckleberry—grows near wild blueberries, tastes similar, but unrelated
- Goji or wolfberry
- Goldenberry
- Gooseberries
- Groundcherry—multiple species from North and South America
- Guarana
- Guava
- Guaviyú
- Hackberries
- Hawthorn, fruit
- Hazelnut, also called filbert
- Hierba Luisa
- Hueinacaztli, or ear-flower
- Hickory nuts
- Hogpeanut
- Holly
- Hops
- Horsemint
- Chenopodium berlandieri, Huazontle, pitseed goosefoot
- Huckleberries
- Indian cucumber
- Indian potato or hopniss, openowag, cinnamon vine, groundnut (cultivated in Japan as hodoimo, edible root bulbs and beans, dried flowers as spice)
- Jack in the pulpit root
- Jambú
- Jerusalem artichoke
- Jicama
- Juniper berries
- Kaniwa
- Kentucky coffeetree
- Kiwicha
- Lamb's-quarters, leaves and seeds
- Lapacho
- Lechehuana, honey
- Lemon-verbena, lemon-tasting herb
- Lilypad root
- Locust, blossoms and pods
- Lúcuma
- Maca
- Maize, throughout the Americas, probably domesticated in or near Mexico, includes blue corn
- Mamey
- Manzanita
- Maple syrup and sugar, used as a sweetener and seasoning in the Eastern Woodlands
- Mesquite, bean pods, flour/meal
- Mexican oregano
- Milkweed
- Mint, various species, American mint is best known in eastern woodlands region
- Mooseberry, called highbush cranberry in Eastern US, actually a type of Viburnum
- Mulberries
- Nopales, cactus
- Okra
- Onions
- Oregon grape
- Palmetto
- Surinam cherry
- Papaya
- Passionfruit
- Pawpaw
- Peanuts, originated in Peru
- Pecans
- Pennyroyal, American false variety
- Persimmon
- Pigweed, seeds
- Pine (including western white pine and Pinus ponderosa)—inner bark (used as sweetener), sap as chewing gum ingredient, tips for jelly, cuttings for tea, and pinenuts
- Pineapples, South America
- Pinyon, nuts
- Piñonero, nuts
- Pipsissewa
- Plum
- Popcorn flower, herb
- Potatoes, South America
- Prickly pears
- Prairie turnips
- Pumpkins
- Purslane—leaves
- Quinoa, South America, Central America, and Eastern North America
- Ramps, wild onion
- Raspberries
- rock cress
- Rose pepper
- Sage
- Saguaro cactus, fruits and seeds
- Salt
- Sangre de drago
- Sapote
- Sassafras, tea, seasoning, also calledgumbo filé
- Screwbean, fruit
- Sedge. tubers
- Sea grape or uva de playa
- Serviceberry. also juneberry, saskatoon
- Shepherd's purse leaves
- Solomon's seal
- Sotol, crowns
- Soursop or guanábana
- Spanish bayonet, fruit
- Spanish lime or mamoncillo
- Common spicebush, seasoning
- Spikenard, berries and roots for tea, some tribes ate roots (this is a select species, of which there are many in the Americas and not all species are edible, though Natives had wide medicinal and practical uses)
- Squash, throughout the Americas
- Stevia, sweetener
- Strawberries
- Sumac, berries
- Sunflower seeds
- Sweet anise
- Sweet potato, South America (misleading name: not a potato)
- Sweetsop or sugar-apple
- Tamarillo
- Teaberry or wintergreen
- Tobacco
- Tomatillo
- Tomato
- Texas persimmons or sugar plum
- Tuckahoe
- Tulip poplar, syrup made from bark
- Tule, rhizomes
- Banana passionfruit, Tumbo or taxo
- Vanilla, seasoning
- Vetch, pods
- Wapato root
- White evening primrose, fruit
- White walnuts or butternuts
- Wild carrot, also harbinger of spring, salt and pepper
- Wild celery
- Wild cherries
- Wild grapes, fruit
- Wild honey
- Wild onion
- Wild pea, pods
- Wild roses
- Wild sweet potato (misleading name: not a potato)
- Wood sorrel, leaves
- Yacón, nectar
- Yaupon holly, leaves
- Yerba buena
- Yerba mate
- Yucca, blossoms, fruit, and stalks
- Zamia, nuts

=== Fungi ===
- black trumpet
- chicken of the woods
- chanterelles
- hen of the woods
- Lichen (certain species)
- morels
- oyster mushrooms
- puffball

=== Animals ===
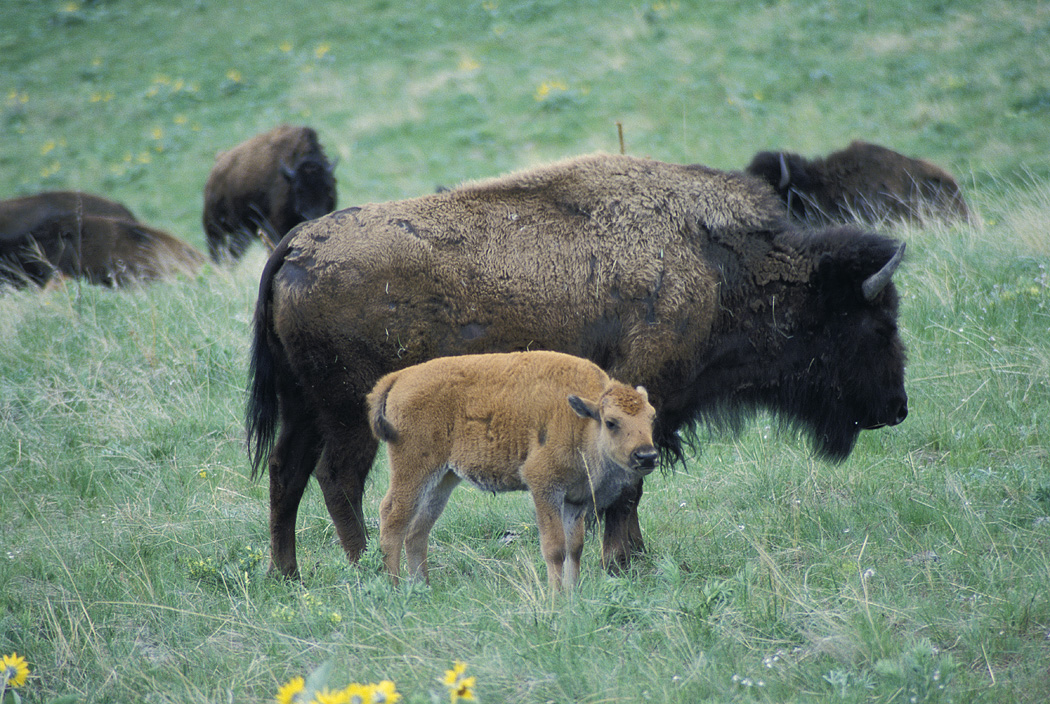
Bison cow and calf

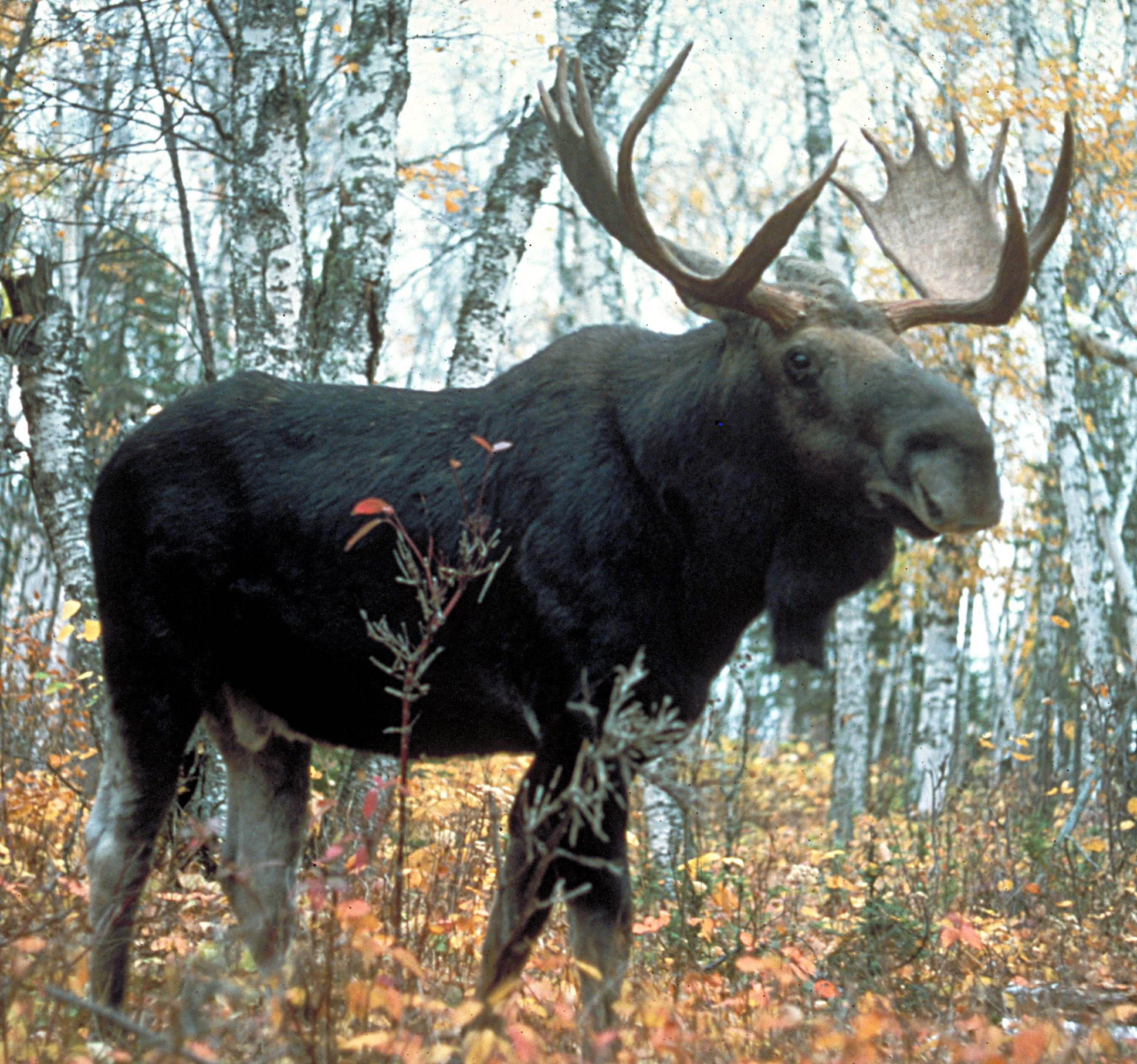
Moose

- Anteater
- Armadillo
- Badger
- Bear
- Beaver
- Bighorn sheep
- Bison—originally found throughout most of the North American plains
- Capybara
- Chipmunk
- Deer
- Dove
- Duck
- Elk
- Ants
- Geese
- Groundhog
- Grouse
- Guanaco—hunted in South America by hunter-gatherer societies, for ex. in Patagonia until the 19th century
- Guinea pig—domesticated in the Andes
- Hog—important European import
- Honey wasp—Brachygastra mellifica, Brachygastra lecheguana, and Polybia occidentalis, a source of honey found from the Southwestern United States to Argentina
- Horse—although imported by Europeans, the horse was still very important to Indigenous cultures throughout the Americas (famously on the North American Plains) in the historic era
- Hutia
- Iguana
- Llama—domesticated in the Andes
- Locust (cicada)
- Manatee
- Moose
- Mourning dove
- Muscovy duck—domesticated in Mesoamerica
- Opossum
- Otter
- Passenger pigeon—extinct
- Peccaries
- Pheasant
- Porcupine
- Prairie dog
- Pronghorn (antelope)
- Quail
- Rabbit
- Raccoon
- Sheep—important European import in Oasisamerica
- Skunk
- Sloth
- Stingless bee—Melipona beecheii and M. yucatanica, Maya source of honey
- Squirrel
- Turkey
- Turtle
- Yacare caiman
- Wood rat

== Notable chefs, restaurateurs, and food writers ==
- Lois Ellen Frank
- Mariah Gladstone, founder of Indigikitchen
- Sean Sherman, a member of the Oglala Lakota Sioux.
- Vincent Medina, a member of the Muwekma Ohlone
- Dana Thompson
- Louis Trevino, a member of the Rumsen Ohlone
- Sherry Pocknett, a member of the Mashpee Wampanoag

== See also ==
- Plants used in Native American cuisine
- House dish
- Hunter gatherer
- Locavores
- Tlingit cuisine
- Wild onion festival
- Inuit diet
- List of First Nations peoples
- Aboriginal food security in Canada
- Peasant food
- Staple food
- Soul food
- Bushmeat (Africa)
- Bushfood (Australia)
- Game (food)

== Bibliography ==
- Coe, Sophie D. (1994). America's First Cuisines. Austin, Texas: University of Texas Press. ISBN 978-0-292-71159-4.
- Hetzler, Richard (2010). The Mitsitam Cafe cookbook : recipes from the Smithsonian National Museum of the American Indian. Washington, D.C.: Smithsonian National Museum of the American Indian. ISBN 978-1-55591-747-0.
- Niethammer, Carolyn (1974). American Indian Food and Lore. New York: A Simon & Schuster Macmillan Company. ISBN 0-02-010000-0.
