= Lois Ellen Frank =

American food historian and culinary anthropologist

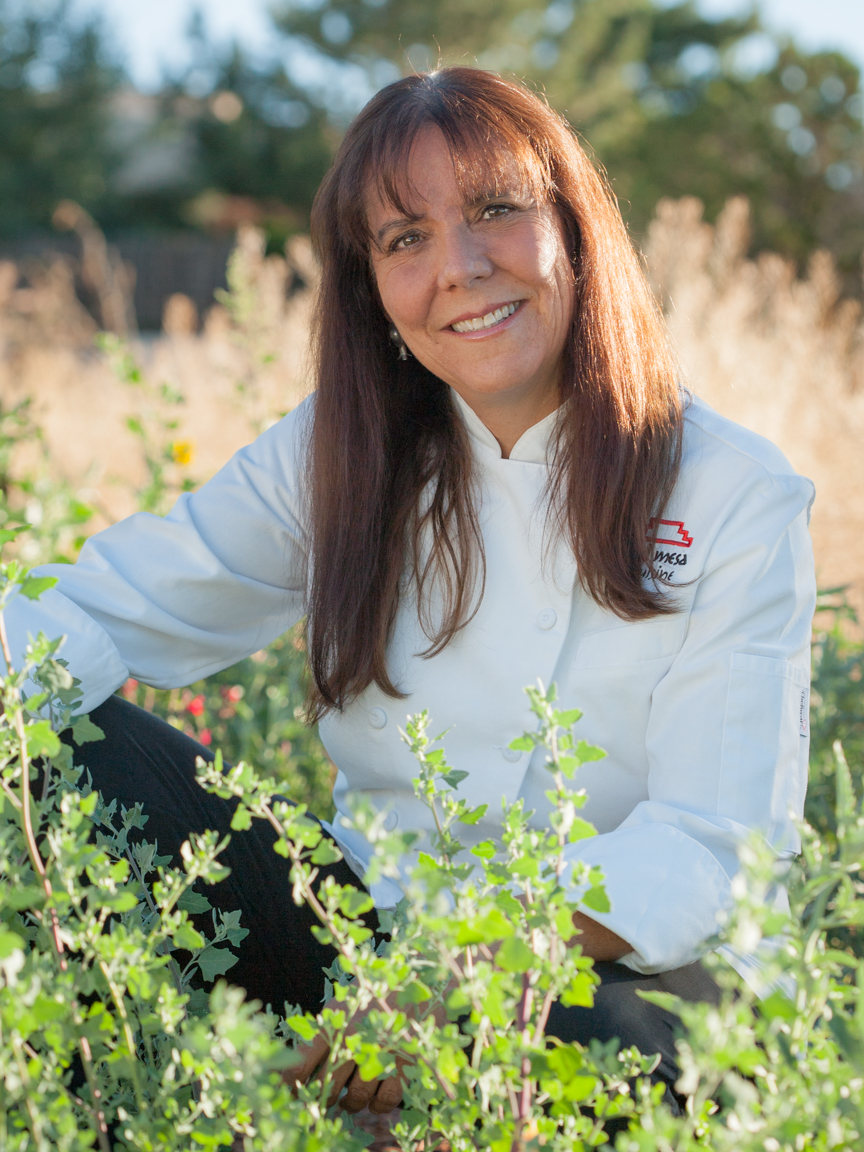
- Frank in 2019
- Born: 1960 or 1961 (age 65–66); New York City, US
- Citizenship: American
- Occupations: Food historian, author, educator
- Notable work: Foods of the Southwest Indian Nations
- Awards: 2003 James Beard Foundation Award

Lois Ellen Frank is an American food historian, cookbook author, culinary anthropologist, and educator. She won a 2003 James Beard Foundation Award for her cookbook Foods of the Southwest Indian Nations, the first cookbook of Native American cuisine to receive the award.

== Early life ==
Frank was born in New York City to a father who is Sephardic Jewish and to a mother, Jeanne Allen West Frank Richman (1930–2017), from the Kiowa nation.

Frank's maternal grandmother and mother of Jeanne Allen West Frank Richman was Marjorie Rose Keufner (c. 1902–1990), born in Norwalk, Connecticut, worked as financial secretary for Dun & Bradstreet. Richman's father and Frank's maternal grandfather was James Allen West.

Frank's paternal grandmother, Elizabeth Barazani Frank of Brooklyn, was descended from a Sephardi family who fled the Spanish Inquisition and settled in Ottoman Turkey, then made aliyah to Palestine (region), and then migrated to New York City through Ellis Island in 1915.

== Education ==
Frank attended culinary school and then attended the Brooks Institute, graduating with a degree in photography in 1985. She earned a master's in cultural anthropology in 1999 with a thesis connecting indigenous tribes throughout the Americas on the basis of their use of corn. She earned her PhD in cultural anthropology from the University of New Mexico, submitting her dissertation on "The Discourse and Practice of Native American Cuisine: Native American Chefs and Native American Cooks in Contemporary Southwest Kitchens".

== Career ==
During college, Frank worked as a cook at the first Good Earth restaurant. After graduation she worked in the advertising industry, photographing commercial shoots for Evian, Taco Bell and International House of Pancakes.

A mentor, Ernst Haas, questioned the meaningfulness of her work and encouraged her to explore her heritage. She had a "moment of reckoning", realizing she was "making food that I wouldn't even eat look beautiful, and then promoting others to eat it". In the 1980s, she started asking questions about Native American cuisine and "was told there was no such thing". She told The New York Times: "But of course they had a cuisine, and it was intricate, diverse and delicious". Around the same time she met Juanita Tiger Kavena, who had written Hopi Cookery (1980), one of the first cookbooks by a Native American cook.

In 1991 she proposed a book on Native American cuisine to publishers in New York. "They told me that Native people didn't have a cuisine", she recalled in a 2013 interview, "and that I didn't have the credentials to write any such book". She returned to school to earn her master's degree and a doctorate in cultural anthropology, and recalls that "at the time, they were teaching that American cuisine was made up of immigrant populations. The traditions of Native kitchens were largely overlooked".

She talked to and collected recipes from the Hopi, Ute, Pueblo, and other Southwestern tribes, and in 2002 Ten Speed Press published her cookbook Foods of the Southwest Indian Nations, in collaboration with Walter Whitewater (Diné). In 2003, the book won a James Beard Foundation Award, the first cookbook on Native American cuisine or by a Native American author so honored. CNN called it "the first Native American cookbook to turn the heads of James Beard Foundation Award judges".

In 2017 Frank was featured in Native American Food Movements, a public television documentary about traditional diets.

She serves as a Culinary Ambassador Diplomat for the United States Department of State's Bureau of Educational and Cultural Affairs, travelling with Whitewater to Ukraine (2013), the United Kingdom (2015), and Russia (2016), to teach about Native American foodways.

Her 2023 cookbook, Seed to Plate, Soil to Sky: Modern Plant-Based Recipes using Native American Ingredients, was nominated for three 2024 IACP awards in the American, Food Issues & Matters, and Health & Wellness categories. The book won the latter two categories.

== Academic and consultant career ==
Frank is an adjunct professor at the Institute of American Indian Arts in Santa Fe, New Mexico, where her classes have included Traditional Arts and Ecology, Ethnobotany of Foods and Plants of the Southwest, and Indigenous Concepts of Native American Foods. She teaches classes on Native American cuisine at the Santa Fe School of Cooking. She works on issues surrounding Native American diet and diabetes with the Physicians Committee for Responsible Medicine and is a Certified Lifestyle Coach for the National Diabetes Prevention Program. She consults for the Cultural Conservancy on Native American Foodways.

She and business partner Whitewater founded and operate Red Mesa Cuisine, a catering company and educational organization specializing in traditional Native American cuisine.

== Philosophy ==
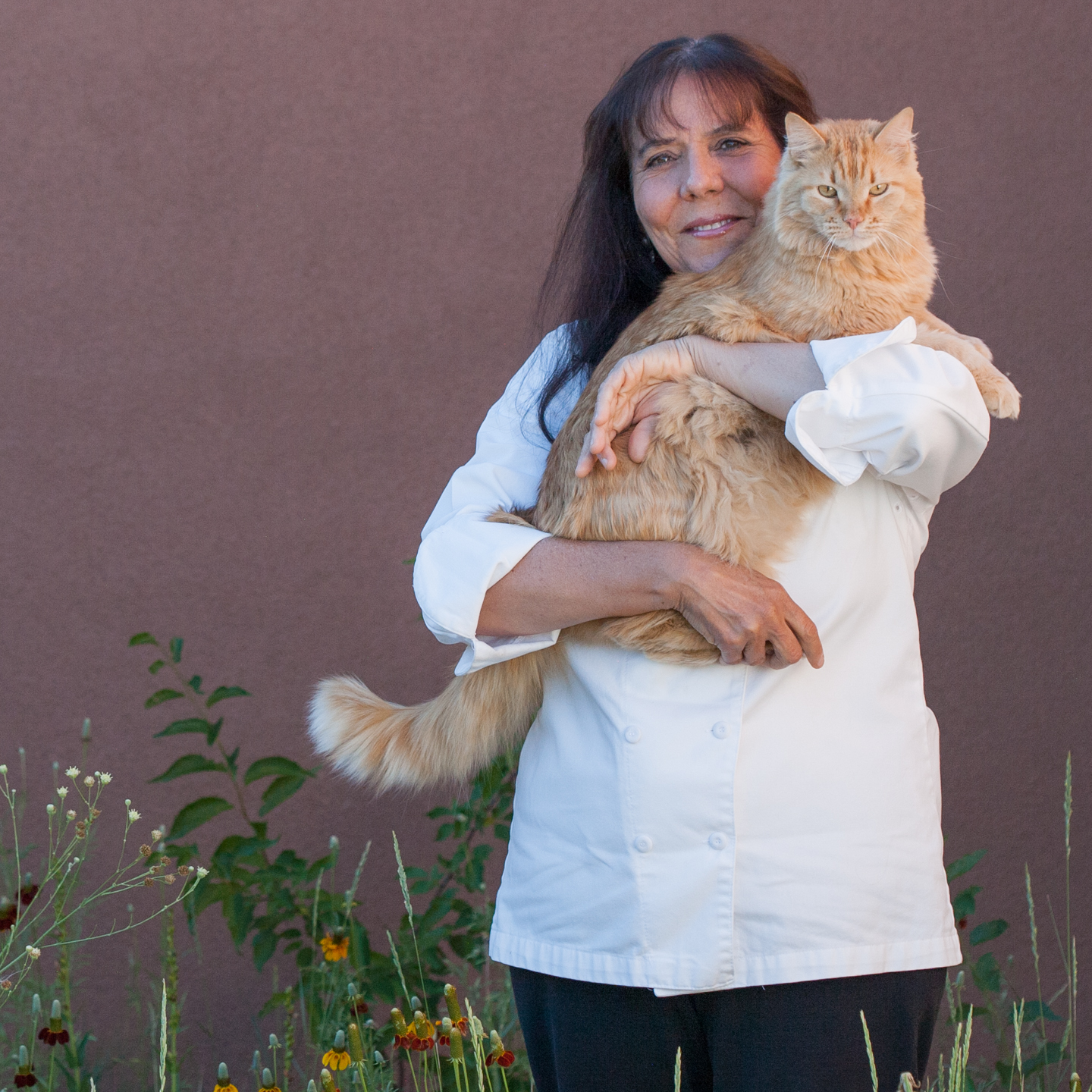
Frank in her Santa Fe, New Mexico, garden

Frank delineates four major periods in Native American cuisine. The first is prior to 1492, which she calls "Pre-Contact", when Native Americans were of necessity relying on ingredients they grew, gathered, or hunted in their local areas. The second is "First Contact," when European ingredients like Eurasian domesticated animals were added to Native American diets. The third was the "Government Issue" period, during which many Native Americans were removed from areas where they could produce their own food and provided government commodity ingredients such as flour, sugar and lard in order to provide a subsistence diet resulting in the creation of foods of necessity like frybread, which she calls "a very complicated food for me. It represents survival. If the ancestors had not created this bread, they might have starved ... For some it is a comfort food, for others including some chefs and some Native community members, it represents colonization and a period of time in history that is traumatic." The current period she calls "New Native American," characterized by Native American chefs returning to the pre-contact ingredients and recipes.

Frank calls potatoes, tomatoes, corn, beans, squash, chili, cacao, and vanilla the "magic eight" ingredients that were found and used only in the Americas before 1492 and were taken via the Columbian exchange back to the Old World, dramatically transforming the cuisine there. According to Frank,

If we deconstruct that these foods were inherently native, then that means that the Italians didn't have the tomato, the Irish didn't have the potato, half the British National Dish—Fish and Chips—didn't exist. The Russians didn't have the potato, nor did they have vodka from the potato. There were no chiles in any Asian cuisine anywhere in the world, nor were there any chiles in any East Indian cuisine dishes, including curries. And the French had no confection using either vanilla or chocolate. So the Old World was a completely different place.

Unlike some Native American chefs and cookbook authors, she believes that others developing recipes for and cooking Native American cuisine is not a problem if Native American producers, such as wild rice harvesters, are benefitting.

Her recipes have a vegetable-forward approach, and she has said she prefers to develop menus focussed primarily on foods from the Pre-Contact period and some from the First Contact period. She believes foods from the Government Issue period created health issues such as high rates of diabetes and prefers not to use them often.

== Personal life ==
Frank lives in Santa Fe, New Mexico.

== Bibliography ==
- Seed to Plate, Soil to Sky: Modern Plant-Based Recipes using Native American Ingredients (2023)
- Taco Table (2013)
- Foods of the Southwest Indian Nations (2002)
- Native American Cooking (1995)
