= Crystal Wahpepah =

Kickapoo chef

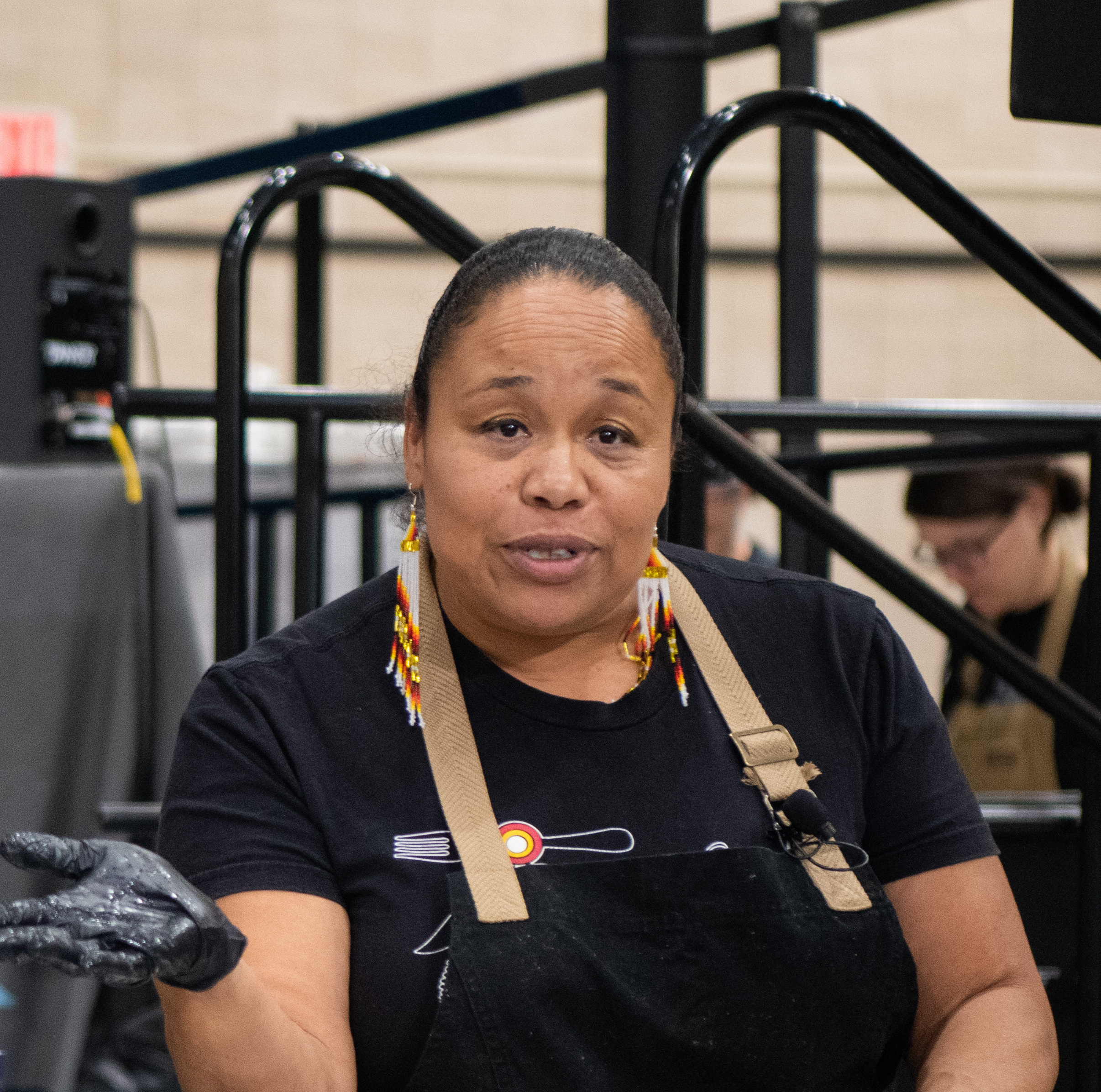
- Wahpepah in 2022
- Born: Oakland, California
- Education: Le Cordon Bleu
- Style: Native American cuisine

Crystal Wahpepah is an Indigenous American chef. She was the first Indigenous chef on the cooking program Chopped. Wahpepah runs both a catering business and a restaurant, which aim to reclaim Native American cuisine. She received the Indigenous Artist Activist Award. Wahpepah was a James Beard Award finalist in the Emerging Chef category in 2022.

Wahpepah was born and raised in Oakland, California. She is a member of the Kickapoo and Sac and Fox tribes of Oklahoma. As a child, she cooked with her older relatives.

== Career ==
Wahpepah attended the Le Cordon Bleu cooking school, where she studied French cooking. Later, she traveled around the United States and learned more about Native farming and cooking. At the time of the opening of her restaurant, Wahpepah's Kitchen, there were no Indigenous food restaurants in the San Francisco Bay Area.
