= Kanuchi =

Traditional Cherokee Indian soup

- Alternative names: ᎧᏅᏥ or ᎦᎾᏥ
- Type: Soup
- Place of origin: Cherokee nation
- Region or state: North America
- Main ingredients: Hickory nutmeat, water
- Variations: Pecans and walnuts

Kanuchi (Cherokee: ᎧᏅᏥ, romanized: kanvtsi; or ᎦᎾᏥ, romanized: ganatsi) is a hickory nut soup eaten originally by the Cherokee people and which consists primarily of ground hickory nuts boiled in water. Hickory was the nut of choice (probably the species Carya ovata, known for its natural sweetness), since it is a nut tree endemic to North America, and is known to grow plentifully in those forested areas settled by the Cherokee.

== History ==
E. Lewis Sturtevant describes in his book, Sturtevant's Notes on Edible Plants, the practice of "Florida Indians [sic] who made a milky liquor, which they called milk of nuts" from the Shagbark hickory nuts. Sturtevant adds that Bernard Romans noted that "This milk they are very fond of and eat it with sweet potatoes in it."

== Nutritional value and historical use ==
Dried hickory nutmeat is high in both fat and protein, containing 3% water, 18% carbohydrates, 13% protein, and 64% fats. The nut was generally rendered into oil or made into a kind of nutmeal ball that could be used to make stock for stews and soups. Traditionally, kanuchi was eaten by adding the soup broth to corn or hominy (Cherokee: A-ma-ge-i (ᎠᎹᎨᎢ)) that had been prepared from the flint corn (Cherokee: Se-lu (ᏎᎷ)). Hickory King corn has also traditionally been used for making hominy.

== Traditional manner of preparation ==
Kanuchi is made by gathering hickory nuts (Cherokee: ᏐᎯ, romanized: so-hi) in the wild, usually in October. The outer hulls are removed, while the nuts, complete with their inner-shells, are then dried on a rack in front of a fire. Since hickory nuts are rarely commercially exported, the hickory nut can be substituted by making use of pecans or walnuts, or by using an equal mixture of both walnuts and pecans.

The dried hickory nuts with their shells are placed over a large flat rock that has been inserted within a flat basket lined temporarily with a cloth, and are then cracked open by pounding with a smaller rock. After breaking the outer shells and crushing the nut meat, the resulting nutmeat is sifted through a sieve basket (today, modern sieves and strainers are used). The kernels and small pieces of shell that passed through the sieve are taken up and put into a large wooden corn mortar and there pounded with a large wooden pestle (Cherokee: ᎧᏃᎾ, romanized: ka-no-na) until the substance can be made into balls. The crushed nuts were formed by hand into balls, to be stored in this way for several days until ready for use.

When soup was desired, an earthenware pot partly filled with water was traditionally used. The water was brought to a boil and the balls inserted into the pot of boiling water. Boiling water can also be poured over the balls while they are laid up in the pot, while stirring constantly. Once the soup reaches the right consistency, usually after cooking for 10 minutes, the soup can be ladled out and served. A thick soup is typically served with any type of bread or dumpling, whereas a thin soup may be used as a drink. Today, most food connoisseurs prefer eating kanuchi soup with rice, as its main viand, or else with sweet potatoes. Some recipes call for a dash of maple syrup to sweeten the soup.

== See also ==
- Indigenous cuisine of the Americas
