= Foods of the Southwest Indian Nations =

Cookbook of Native American cuisine

- Author: Lois Ellen Frank
- Language: English
- Genre: Cookbook
- Publisher: Ten Speed Press
- Publication date: 2002
- Publication place: United States

Foods of the Southwest Indian Nations is a 2002 cookbook by Lois Ellen Frank, food historian, cookbook author, photographer, and culinary anthropologist. The book won a 2003 James Beard award, the first Native American cuisine cookbook so honored. CNN called it "the first Native American cookbook to turn the heads of James Beard Foundation award judges".

Frank was working in advertising as a commercial photographer for mass-market food and beverage products when a mentor questioned the meaningfulness of her work, and she had a "moment of reckoning." She proposed a book on Native American cuisine to publishers in New York, who told her "that Native people didn't have a cuisine, and that I didn't have the credentials to write any such book." She returned to school to earn a Master's and then a PhD in Cultural Anthropology, and recalls that "at the time, they were teaching that American cuisine was made up of immigrant populations. The traditions of Native kitchens were largely overlooked."

The book was published in 2002 by Ten Speed Press and collects recipes from the Hopi, Ute, Pueblo, and other Southwestern tribes.
