= Mariah Gladstone =

Native American chef

Mariah Gladstone is a Native American chef, food and environmental advocate, entrepreneur, and educator. Gladstone is founder of the online cooking platform, Indigikitchen, where she focuses on the use of Indigenous recipes and ingredients to teach Native American communities how to prepare traditional foods.

== Early life and education ==
Mariah Gladstone was raised in Kalispell, Montana near a Blackfeet reservation by her Cherokee mother and Blackfeet father. She is an enrolled member of the Blackfeet and Cherokee tribes. Gladstone learned about indigenous food systems, diets and cooking through her grandparents and parents.

Gladstone studied at Columbia University, New York City, where she earned a degree in environmental engineering. She completed a master's degree in environmental science at SUNY College of Environmental Science and Forestry, under the mentorship of Robin Wall Kimmerer, author of Braiding Sweetgrass.

== Career ==
In 2016, Gladstone founded Indigikitchen, an online cooking show focused on reviving indigenous foods and recipes through digital media. The stated purpose of the show is to re-indigenize diets through how-to videos using pre-contact ingredients, and traditional Indigenous recipes. The show highlights diets of Indigenous people that were disrupted by the impacts of colonization. Indigikitchen is a portmanteau of the words Indigenous, digital, and kitchen.

Gladstone has received recognition as a "Champion for Change" with the Center for Native American Youth, and the Robert Wood Johnson Foundation. She was selected as an MIT Solve Indigenous Communities Fellow. She is currently on the board of the Native Youth Food Sovereignty Alliance (NYFSA).

Gladstone created the No Kid Hungry project to incorporate indigenous ingredients and recipes into school lunch programs in Montana.
