= Cuisine of Pará =

Culinary traditions of Pará

Pará cuisine refers to the traditional cuisine native to Pará, Brazil. Foods from this region primarily draw influence from Indian, African, and Portuguese cultures. The core ingredients are sourced from the Amazon jungle, and may include meats such as shrimp, crab, seafood, fish, poultry, bush meat, and duck. These meats are traditionally cooked with leaves (such as maniva, chicory, and coriander), peppers, and herbs. Dishes are cooked in clay pots or barbecued wrapped in leaves and roasted soaked in tucupi, a yellow sauce extracted from wild manioc root native to the Amazon. Dishes may be served in bowls, in containers of clay, wrapped in banana leaves, or in vegetable fiber sifters called urupemas.

== Common ingredients ==
=== Cassava ===
Cassava flour is an essential ingredient in Pará cuisine. The most used cassava flour is manioc flour. Cassava is needed for tucupi, another essential ingredient in local cuisine. It is a yellow sauce extracted from cassava which is either accompanied by meat, fish, or seafood, or eaten by itself with or without jambu. Initially, cassava and its derivatives were only consumed by the poor and Indian people, but over time it has become a staple for all of Pará's families.

== Popular dishes ==
=== Tapioquinha ===
Tapioquinha is a dish made from cassava flour. They can be a pancake and can take several types of fillings like chocolate, various types of cheese, or jelly. The most common way of eating tapioquinha is with butter or coconut only. Tapioquinha is often consumed as breakfast or afternoon snack, usually accompanied by coffee with milk. It can be found in simple establishments, strollers, and snack bars.

=== Duck in tucupi ===
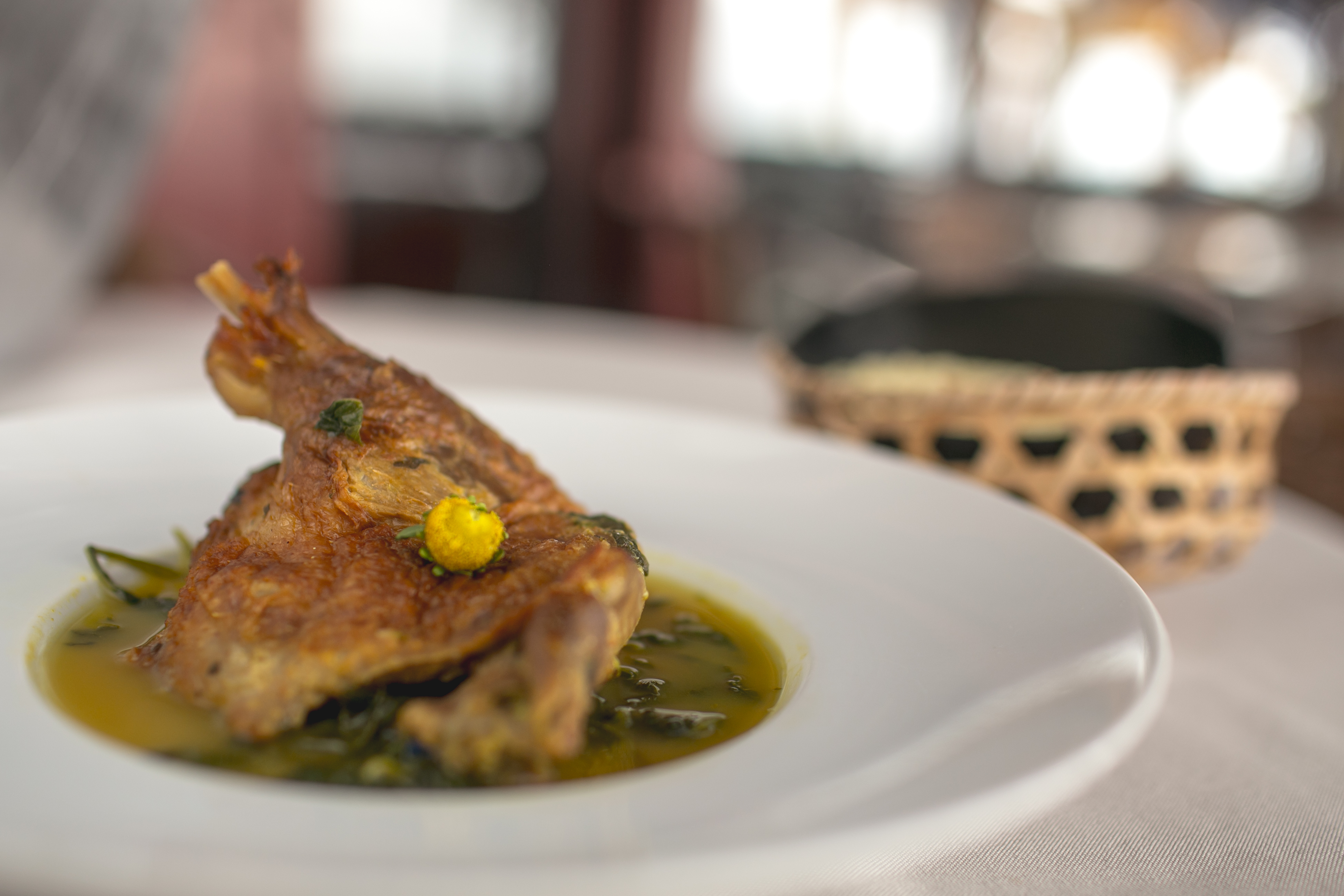
Duck in tucupi, also known as Pato no tucupi

Duck in tucupi, Also known as Pato no tucupi, this dish is made from duck meat, tucupi and Acmella oleracea, known in Brazil as jambu. The herb is found in the Northern region of Brazil. The tucupi is a yellow broth extracted from cassava and needs to be stewed for a week. After being baked, the duck is cut into pieces and stewed in tucupi where it soaks for some time. Then, the jambu is boiled in water with salt, drained and put on the duck. It is served with rice and cassava flour.

=== Maniçoba ===
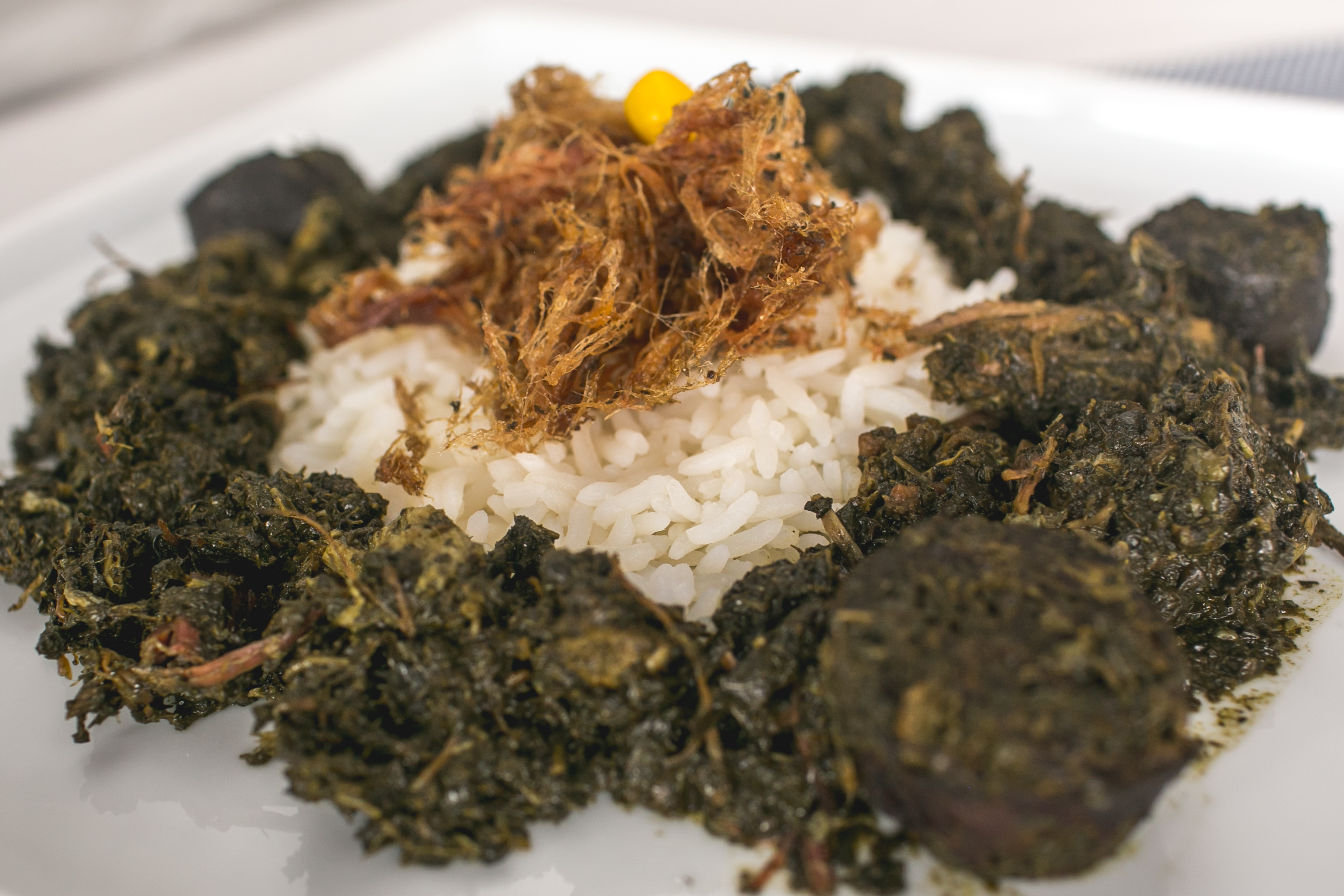
Maniçoba served in a plate

Maniçoba is a festive dish in Brazilian cuisine from the Brazilian state of Pará. It is of indigenous origin, and is made with leaves of the Manioc plant that have been finely ground and boiled for at least four days and up to a week to remove their hydrogen cyanide content. The ground and boiled leaves (maniva) are then mixed with salted pork, dried meat and other smoked ingredients, such as bacon and sausage. The dish is served with rice and cassava meal called "farinha". Maniçoba is usually eaten during the Círio de Nazaré, a religious festival that takes place in October in the city of Belém.

=== Piracuí ===
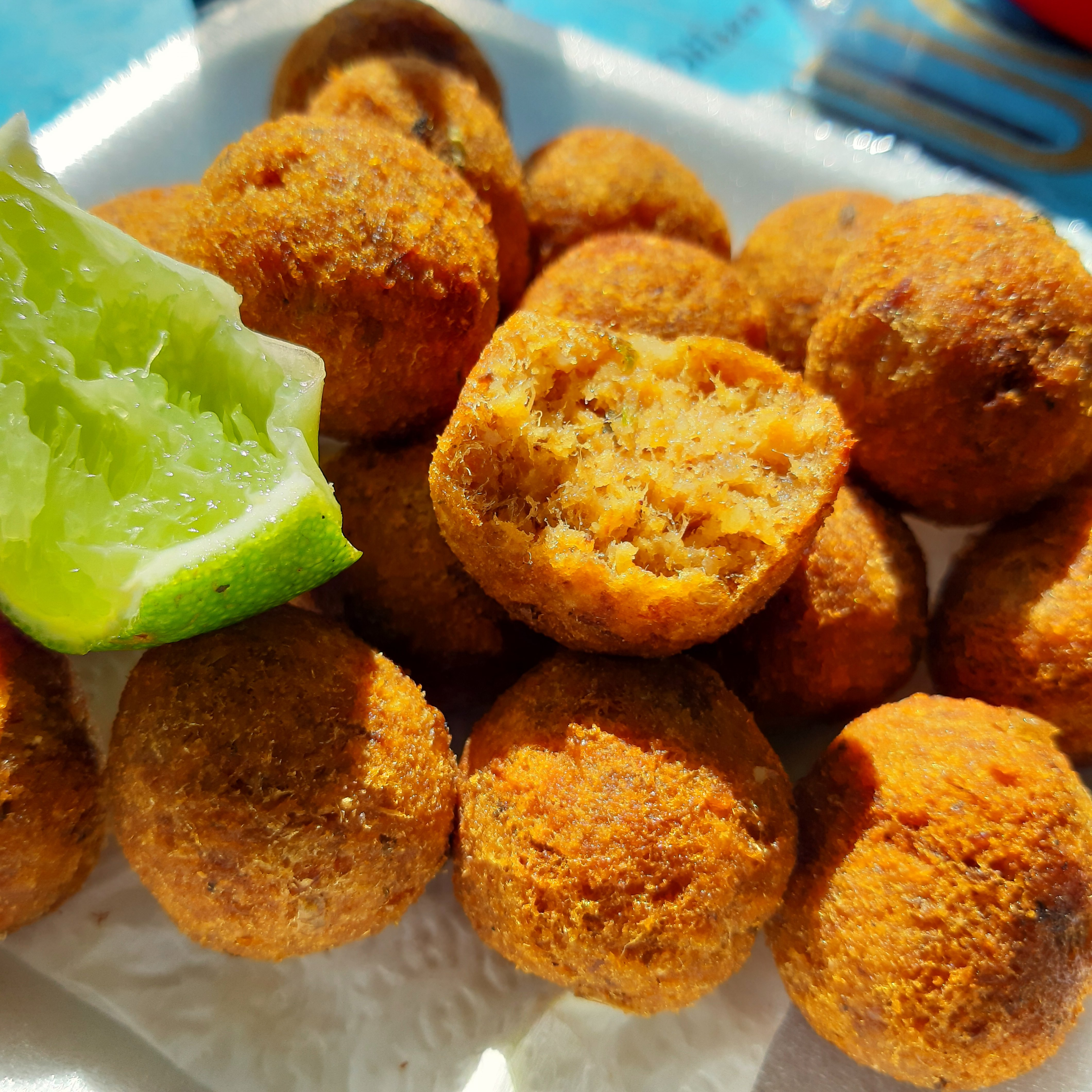
Piracuí is needed to make fried dumplings called Bolinho de piracuí

Piracuí is traditionally known in the Amazon region as "farinha de peixe" (fish flour) and is traditionally made from crushed or shredded dried salted fish. The most common fishes are Acari (Liposarcus pardalis), Tamuatá (Callichthys callichthys) or Bodó, but piracuí can be made from other species of fish.

The fishes are cooked or roasted and then the meat is separated from the carcass. The meat is toasted and is put into continuous motion in a wood burning oven with salt. The final product resembles a flour texture which is then stored to be used in other preparations; It is eaten mixed with olive oil, onion and cassava flour. It also serves to make fried dumplings known as "bolinho de piracuí".

=== Tacacá ===
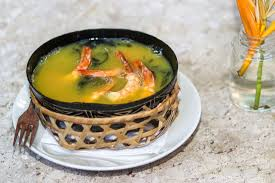
Tacacá served with shrimp

Tacacá is a typical dish of Northern Brazil, mostly consumed in Pará, Amazonas, Acre, Amapá and Roraima. It is made with jambu, tucupi, cooked tapioca gum, and dried shrimp. It is traditionally served hot in a bowl made from an Amazonian gourd known as cuia.

=== Vatapá ===
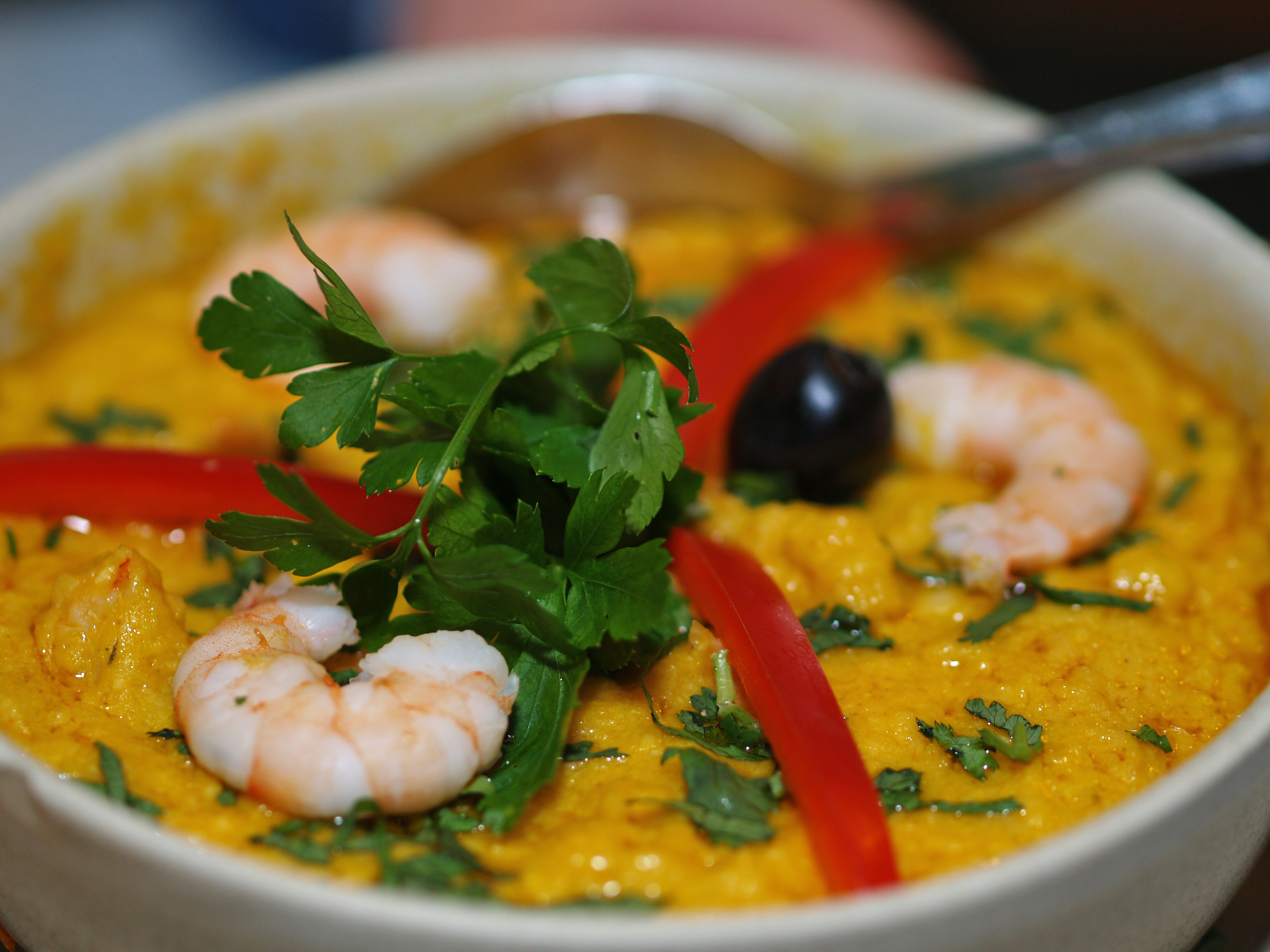
Vatapá

Vatapá is an Afro-Brazilian dish made from bread, shrimp, coconut milk, and finely ground peanuts and palm oil mashed into a creamy paste. It is a typical food of Salvador, Bahia but is also common to the North and Northeast regions of Brazil, including Pará. it is commonly eaten with acarajé, and as a ritual offering in Candomblé, with acaçá or acarajé. Vatapá is often eaten with white rice in other regions of Brazil. The shrimp can be replaced with other ingredients.

=== Pará rice ===
Pará rice contains in addition to the regular white rice, typical ingredients from the Amazon, some of which are often found in Pará markets, such as jambu, shrimp, tucupu, etc.

=== Chibé ===
Xibé, chibé or jacuba is a Brazilian drink typical of Pará cuisine. It is a drink with a slightly acidic taste. It is made by mixing cassava flour and water. The flour grains in the drink swell, resulting in a texture similar to cornmeal but more liquid, with a consistency like porridge. It can be accompanied by salt, pepper or other salty seasonings to taste.

== Desserts ==
Desserts in Pará are mainly fruits and liqueurs from the Amazon. Fruits that are part of the regional cuisine include açaí, cupuaçu, peach, guarana and mango, easily found on any street in the capital of Pará. Local pastries and traditional sweets, such as Monteiro Lopes, make up a small part of the diversity of sweet appetizers. Other regional fruits include bacuri, plum, jackfruit, muruci and the sapodilla. Some important fruits include:

- Açaí: The fruit is commonly served whole in a bowl. It can be served with tapioca or manioc flour. Açaí is often the main meal at lunch, eaten with fish, shrimp or dry meat of ox called charque. The tree, açaizeiro, also produces the açaí palm heart. The palm heart is also frequently used in refined regional dishes.
- Acerola cherry: Fruit rich in vitamin C, it is widely used in local cuisine as juices and frozen desserts.
- Bacaba: Originating from a palm tree of the same family as açaí. The fruit produces a thick juice, used in the same manner as açai for drinks, sweets and ice cream. Its taste is softer than the açaí but is less sought after than it.
- Bacuri: A fruit that can be eaten or made into ice cream, juices, jams, desserts as well as cocktails or alcoholic drinks. Restaurants that specialize in Pará cuisine have been using Bacuri in the composition of savory dishes in the form of sauces or purees.
- Biribá: The fruit can be eaten whole or made into juices and ice cream. Its harvest is from July to September, but it can be found throughout the year in popular tourist locations.
- Cupuaçu: The juice of this fruit is a staple of Pará cuisine. It is also consumed as dessert, ice cream or as a cream. One example is the Cupuaçu cream. The cream is made from condensed milk and Cupuaçu, where sugar is optional. After putting all the ingredients in the blender and mixing them, the Cupuaçu cream is taken to the freezer. The cupuaçu cream is commonly used as frosting. There is also Cupuaçu mousse, which is used as a topping for pies.
- Cupuí: The fruit is often used in drinks such as juice and liqueurs. It is a common find in local markets from February to May.
- Tapioca flour: It is consumed with açaí as porridge or dissolved in warm milk with sugar.
- Guava: The fruit is consumed fresh or as ice cream or juice. The tips of guava branches are used as a tea to combat childhood diarrhea.
- Graviola: The fruit (also known as Soursop) is either consumed in its natural state or as ice cream, creams and cocktails
- Inajá: The fruit is plentiful in the region of Pará. Fruits are consumed right away or used to sweeten porridges, which are thickened with manioc flour or gum.
- Mangaba: The fruit has a viscous, pulpy flesh with a sweet acidic flavor. It is often used to make juices and ice cream.
- Piquia: Low-income populations often consume the fruit cooked, by extracting its pulp straight from the seed and mixing it along with cassava flour, or adding the peeled fruit to a bean broth, beef stew or rice. The fruit can also be added to black coffee.
- Pupunha: The fruit is often cooked with pinches of salt, it is sold mainly in the city's popular markets like Ver-o-Peso. Recently, there has been an interest in broadening and enriching the fruit's possibilities by attempting to use it to create liquors, ice cream, candy in syrup or paste. The fruit has been used in typical restaurants as a side order for beef dishes, either caramelized or mashed.
- Taperebá: Used as flavor for ice cream, juices, popsicles or any other form of sweets. Taperebá juice is a famous drink in Pará.
- Uxi: Either consumed naturally or with cassava flour, it is an important supplement to the caboclo people as well as the majority of the low-income population. It is also found as an ice cream flavor.

== See also ==
- Amazonian cuisine
- Brazilian cuisine
