= Icoaraci =

District of Belém, Pará, Brazil

Coordinates: 1°18′22″S 48°27′38″W

- Administrative District of Icoaraci
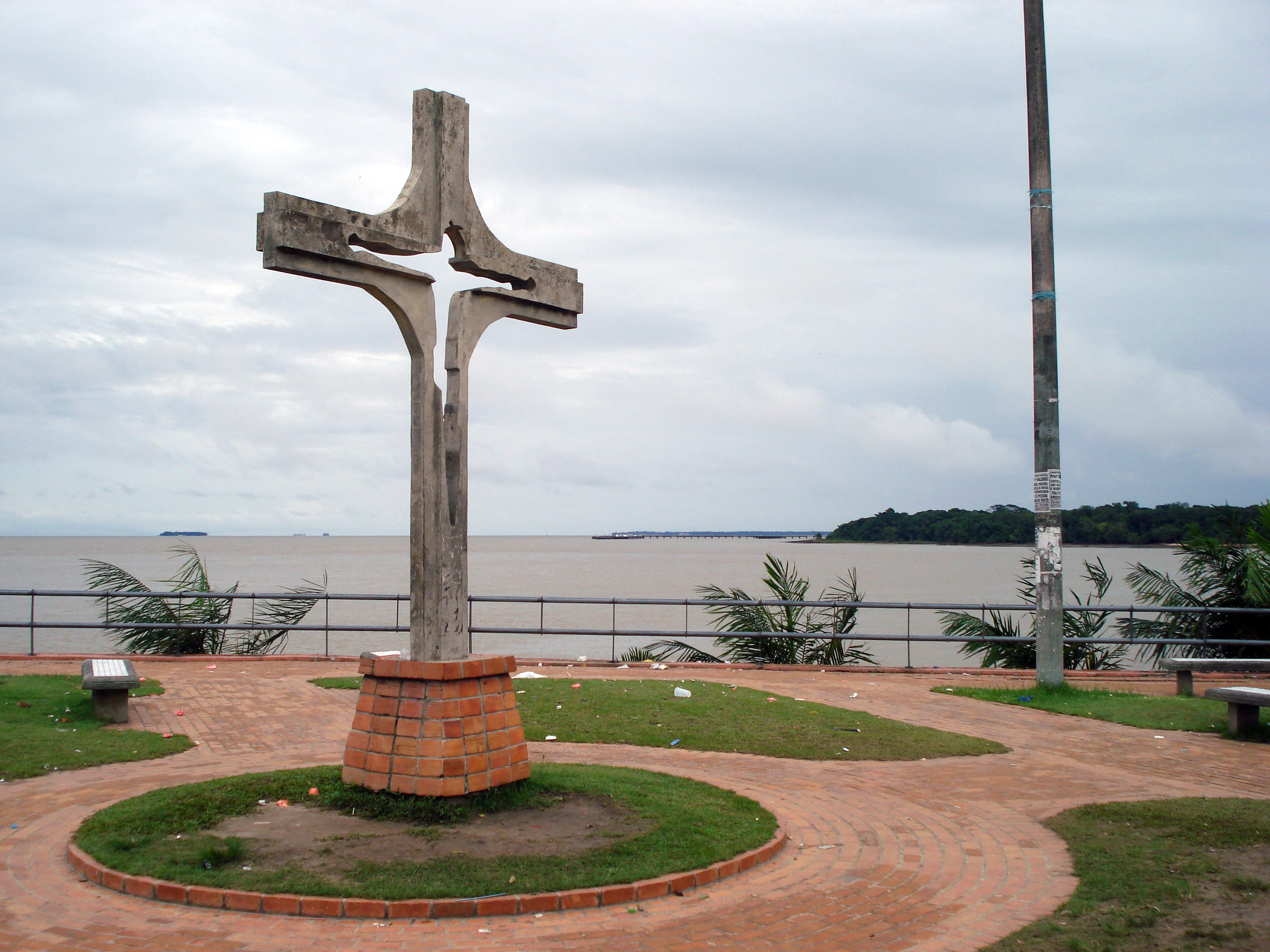
- Icoaraci waterfront
- Interactive map of Icoaraci
- Country: Brazil
- Region: North
- State: Pará
- City: Belém
- Founded: October 8, 1869

Population
  - Total: 200,000

Icoaraci is one of the eight districts in which the municipality of Belém, capital of the state of Pará, in Brazil, is divided. It is located approximately 20 km from the center of the state capital and has around 200,000 inhabitants, according to the IBGE. It is situated near the Outeiro island, which can be accessed by boat at the port of 7th street or by a bridge. In Icoaraci you can also take daily ferries to Marajó Island and boats to Cotijuba Island, which can only be reached this way.

The district center comprises the neighborhoods Águas Negras, Agulha, Campina de Icoaraci, Cruzeiro, Maracacuera, Paracuri, Parque Guajará, Xiteua, Recanto Verde, COHAB, Ponta Grossa, Pratinha, and several residential areas. It has a Human Development Index (HDI) lower than many African countries and regions at war, such as Syria, Afghanistan and Iraq.

Its original nucleus, from which it expanded, retains the terms travessas (English: lane) and ruas (English: streets), the latter called daily in the order of their foundation: 1st, 2nd, and so on until it reaches 7th street.

== Toponym ==
Icoaraci is a word of Tupi origin that means "sun of the river", from the junction of y (water, river) and kûarasy (sun).

== Economy ==
The economy of Icoaraci is based on an industrial park that shelters, mainly, the fishing, wood, carpentry, and heart of palm branches. Another economic hub of the district is the open-air market of Oito de Maio, one of the busiest in Belém and the most frequented in Icoaraci, located in the Campina neighborhood. In addition, the district has three large warehouses, the so-called "atacarejos", a mixture of wholesale and retail foodstuffs.

However, Icoaraci really stands out as an important ceramic handicraft center, installed in the Paracuri neighborhood, where replicas of typical vessels from ancient indigenous nations, mainly Marajoara and Tapajonic, are produced from pieces catalogued by the Paraense Emílio Goeldi Museum.

This art guarantees immeasurable importance to the place, especially cultural, not only for Belém or for Pará, but for the Amazon region, since it is also home to several folkloric groups of typical dances (Asa-Branca, Vaiangá, Balé Folclórico da Amazônia, Grupo de Expressões Culturais Art Marajoara), of musicians (Mestre Verequete, Nazaré Pereira) and of the poet Antônio Tavernard, among other exponents of Amazonian art who still live there, such as Mestre Cardoso (potter) and professor Etelvina (folk dancer), both pioneers in their art.

Tourism is strong in Vila Sorriso, with the exhibition of indigenous ceramics in São Sebastião Square, right on the shore bathed by Guajará Bay, where the visitor is well served by a gastronomic pole composed of typical Pará cuisine (tacacá, maniçoba, pato-no-tucupi), with emphasis on the caldeirada with Amazon river fruits that can be found in the restaurants and kiosks surrounding Cruzeiro Beach.

== Tourist attractions ==
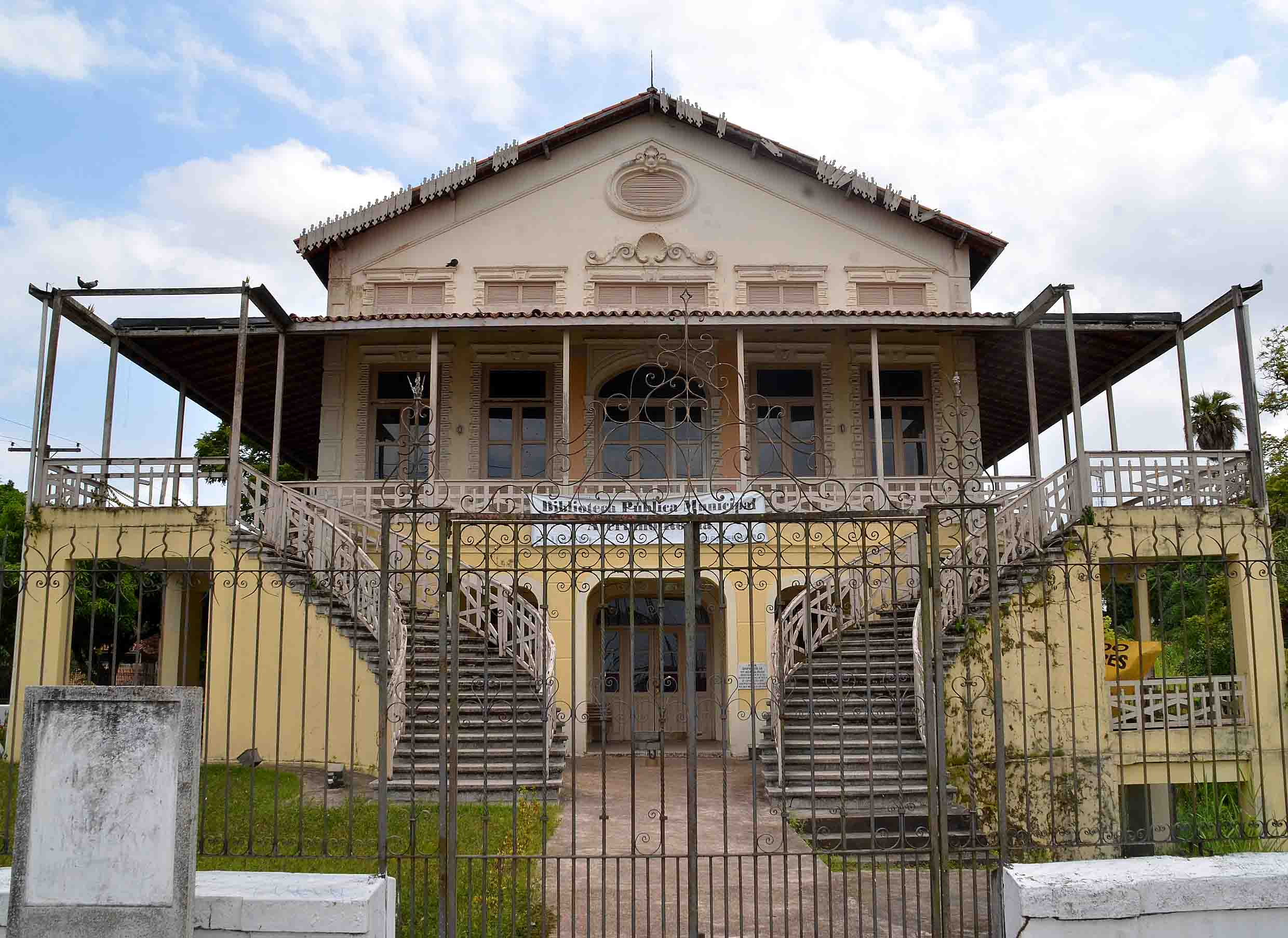
Avertano Rocha Municipal Library, one of the district's tourist attractions.

- Icoaraci waterfront;
- Cruzeiro Beach;
- Paracuri Handicraft Fair;
- Museum of Popular Art;
- Avertano Rocha Municipal Library;
- Outeiro Island;
- Cotijuba Island;
- Artisans' Cooperative - COART;
- Icoaraci Cultural Station, 2019 (Pinheiro's Old Railway Station).

== Streets, Lanes and Avenues ==
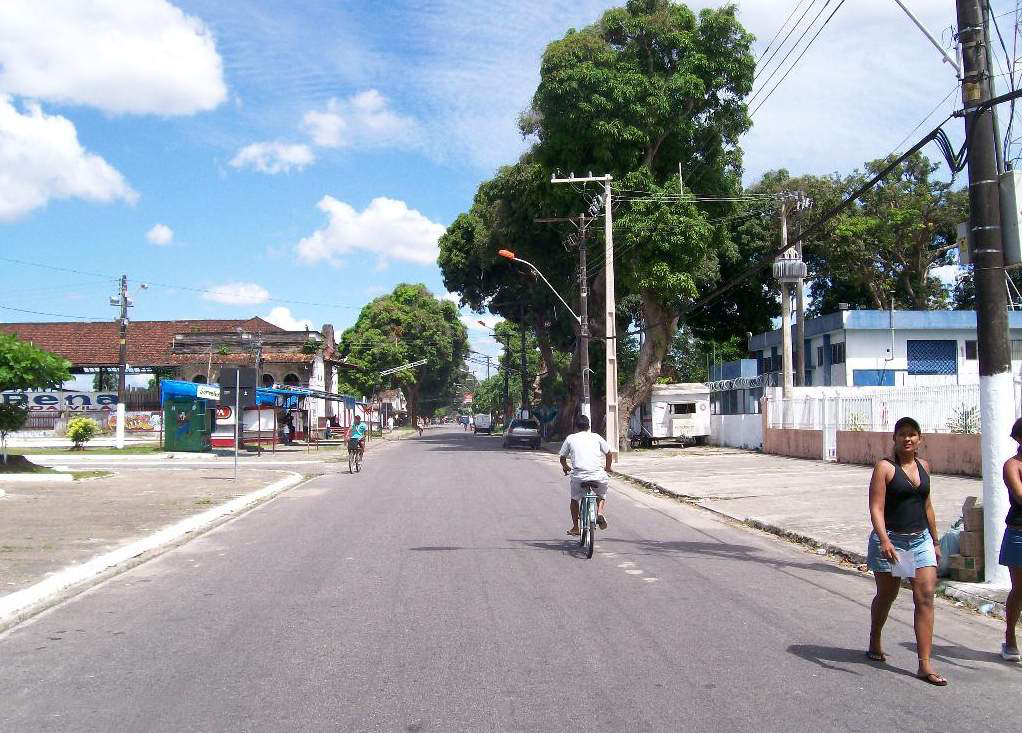
Padre Júlio Maria Street (3rd street).

- Outeiro Road;
- 8 de Maio Street;
- 15 de Agosto Street (4th street);
- Coronel Juvêncio Sarmento Street (5th Street);
- Manoel Barata Street (2nd Street);
- Padre Júlio Maria Street (3rd street);
- Moura Carvalho Lane;
- São Roque Lane;
- Tiradentes Street (Paracuri II neighborhood);
- Castelo Branco Street (Paracuri II neighborhood).

== Gallery ==
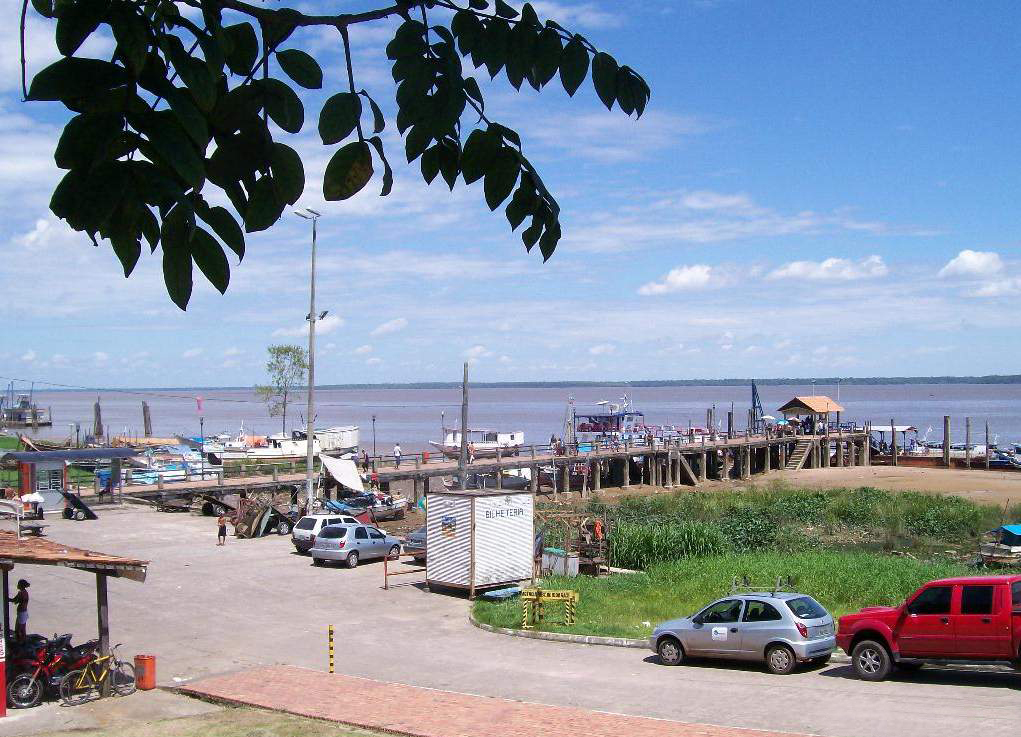
Icoaraci Port.

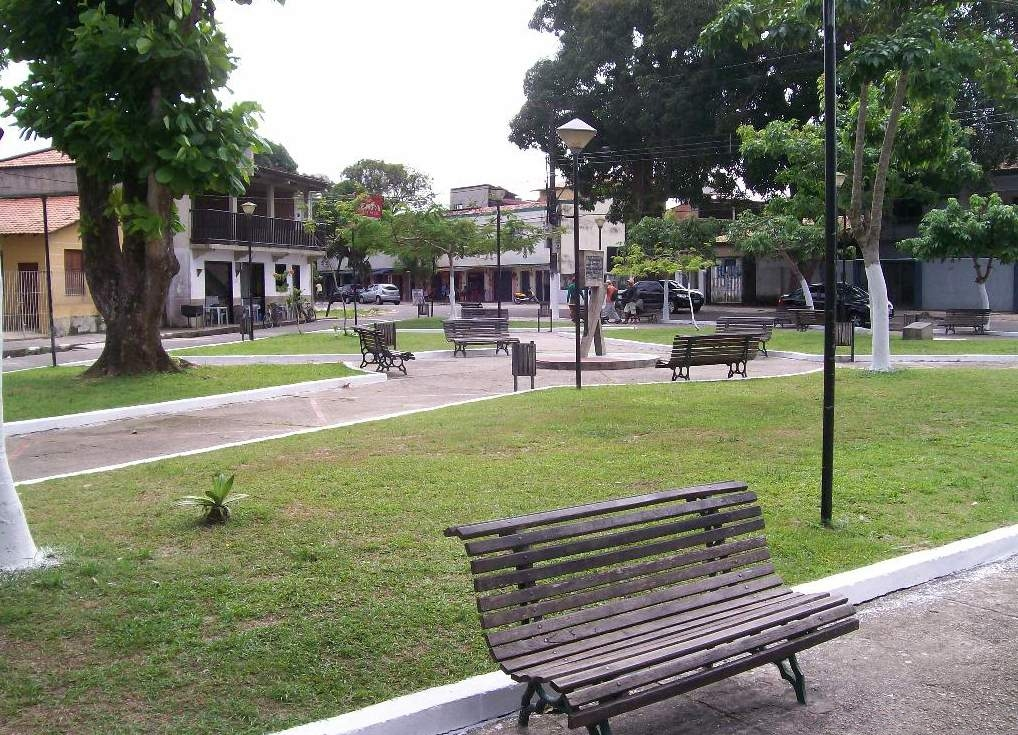
Police Station Square.

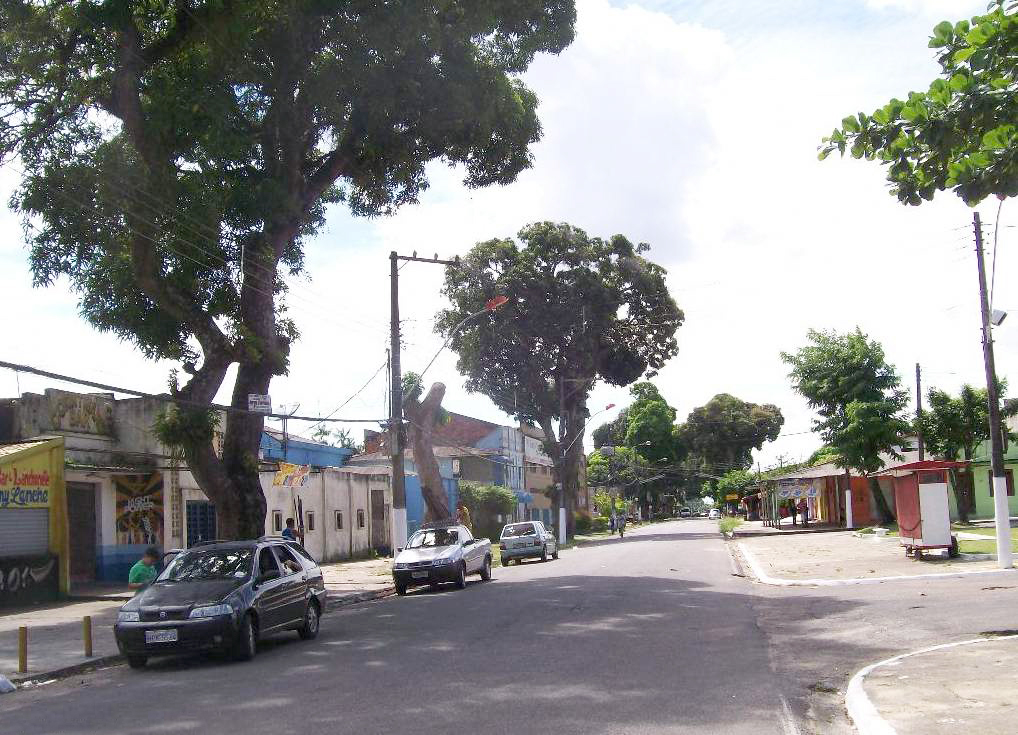
Padre Julio Maria Street.

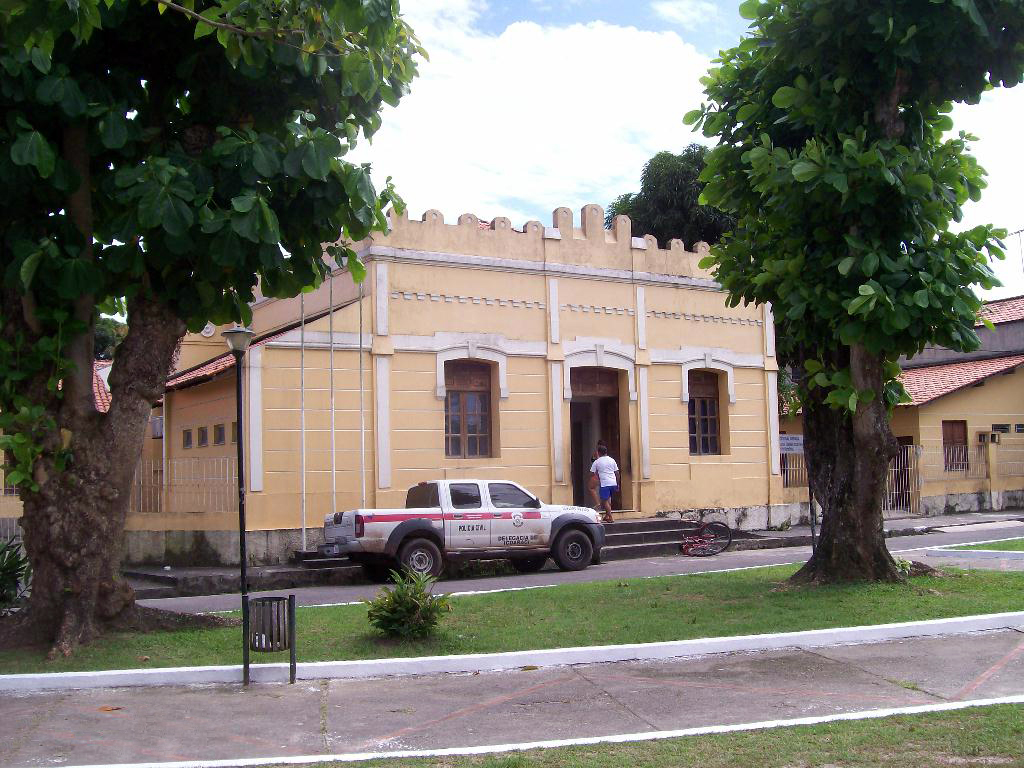
Icoaraci Police Station.

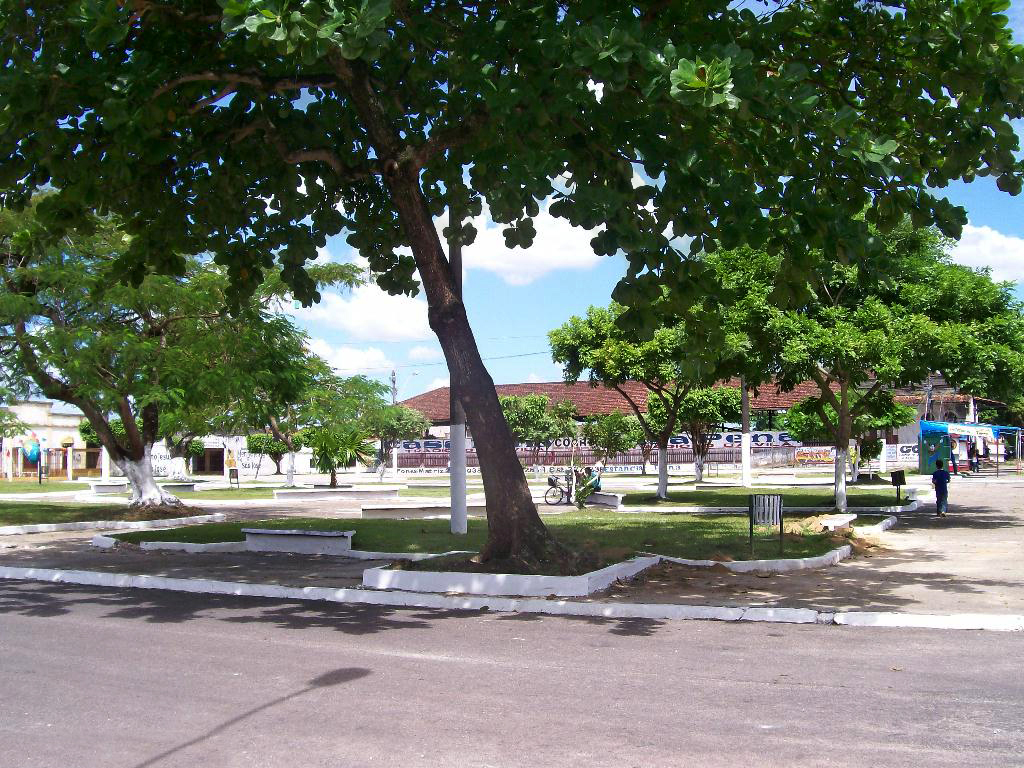
Saint John the Baptist Church Square.
