= Romazava =

Malagasy stew

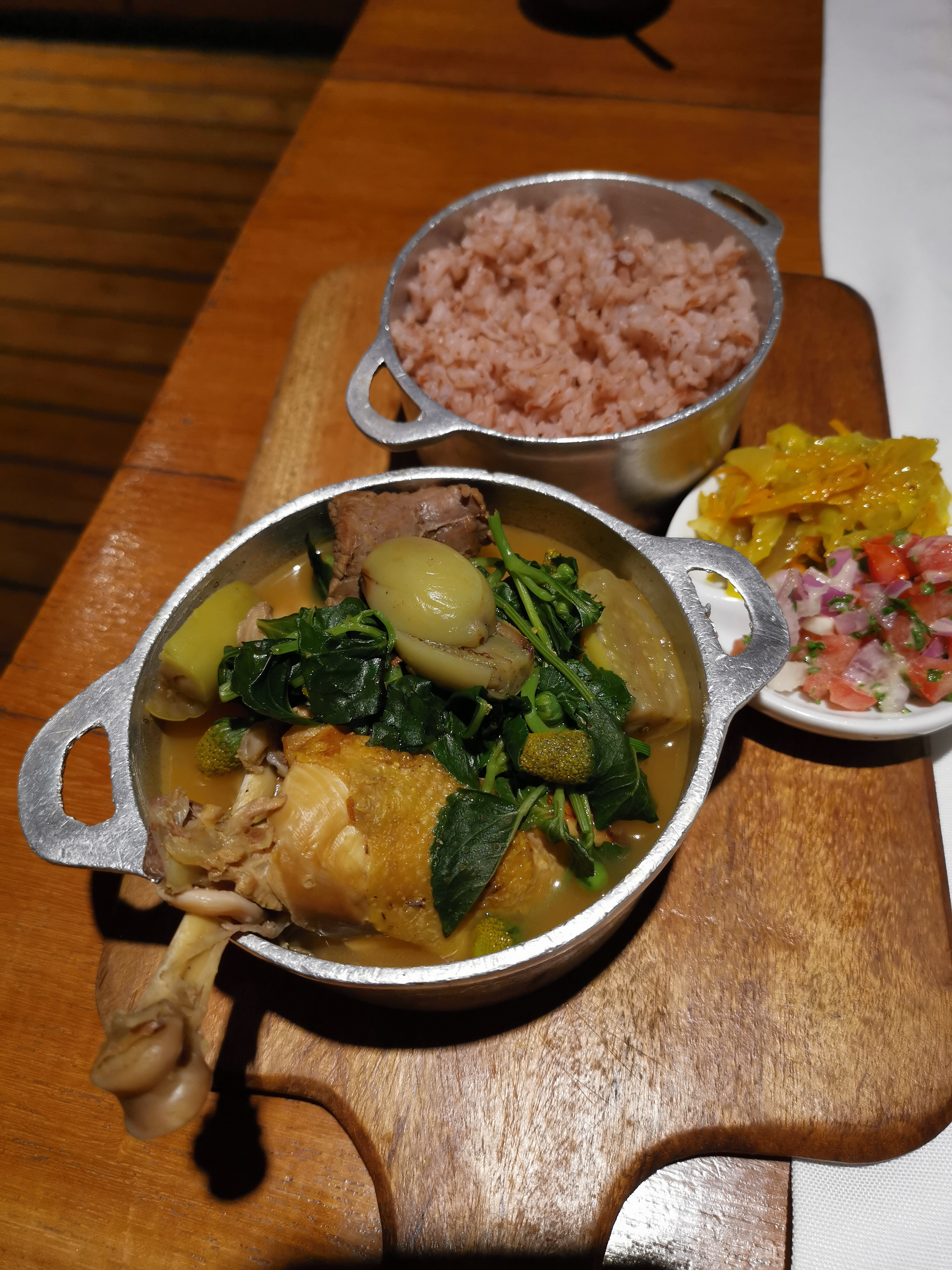
- Romazava
- Place of origin: Madagascar
- Serving temperature: Hot

Romazava ([rumaˈzavə̥]) is the national dish of Madagascar, consisting of greens, zebu meat, tomatoes, and onions, typically accompanied by a portion of rice. An integral component of the stew is brèdes mafana, called anamalaho in Malagasy; the plant holds an acid amide called spilanthol in its buds that elicits a tingly, pungent, citrusy and mouth-numbing effect, inducing excessive saliva production.
