= C14H23NO =

The molecular formula C_{14}H_{23}NO (molar mass: 221.34 g/mol, exact mass: 221.1780 u) may refer to:

- Spilanthol
- Tapentadol
