= Pedro Miguel Schiaffino =

Peruvian chef

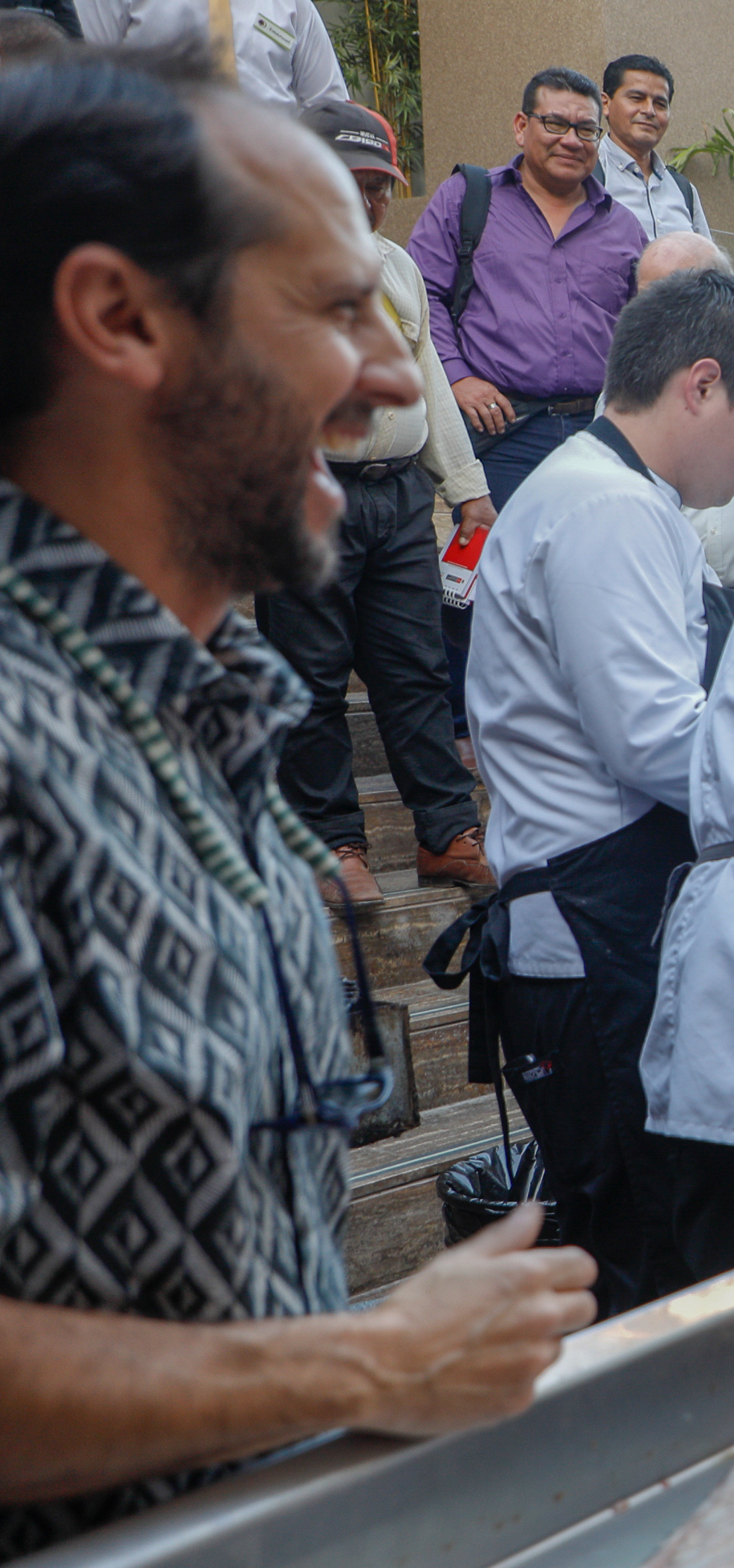

Pedro Miguel Schiaffino is a Peruvian chef who has worked to highlight the foods of the Amazon jungle and Amazonian cuisine. Schiaffino's restaurant in Lima, Peru is called Malabar. He is also executive chef aboard the M/V Aqua. Schiaffino is known as the "jungle chef" and has been compared to René Redzepi.

Schiaffino graduated from the Culinary Institute of America in Hyde Park, New York, in 1997 and did Masters work at the Italian Culinary Institute. While in Italy he at Dal Pescatore under chef Nadia Santini and with Piero Bertinotti at Ristorante Pinocchio.

Ingredients he uses include kushuru (Andean caviar), algae, aguaje (a slightly fermented palm fruit), giant snails, sacha culantro (a type of wild coriander), turmeric, achiote, guinea pig and Andean corn beer. He also uses quinoa and seasonings including cedrón, toronjil, muña, sachatomate, and aguaymanto.

His menu offerings have included dishes such as:

- Tuna brulé with cocona-lime juice and tobiko wild caigua with scallops, Andean seaweed, and maca root (known as Andean Viagra)
- Fish ceviche with tumbo
- Paiche with masato and black tapioca
- Arroz con pato (Spanish rice with duck)
- Copoazu and green melon
- Lúcuma and deep fried "truffles"

== See also ==
- Peruvian cuisine
