= Amazonian cuisine =

Culinary traditions of the Amazon Jungle, South America

Amazonian cuisine includes the foods and preparation methods of various peoples in the Amazon jungle of South America, including the dishes they have popularized among neighbors.

== Brazil ==
Maniçoba is an Amazonian dish from Brazil made with pieces of meat, sausage, manioc, and culantro leaves. Amazonian cuisine includes many freshwater fish such as peixe nobre (noble fish), the pirarucu (the world's largest freshwater fish), and tambaqui. Smaller fishes such as surubim, curimatã, jaraqui, acari and tucunaré are also eaten, often grilled or sometimes fried. Served in a tomato sauce, the dishes are known as escabeche; they can also be prepared in coconut milk or stewed in tucupi (a sauce made with fermented manioc juices). Tacacá is a shrimp soup and vatapá is a Bahian seafood dish.

Staples of Amazonian cuisine include manioc, a starchy root vegetable, as well as fruit. Juices and ice creams are made from them, including acerola, graviola, fruta de conde (also referred to as ata in Spanish and as sugar-apple in English), and cupuaçu. Açai is gaining widespread renown. There are also juices from trees such as taperebá and palm trees including buriti, bacuri and bacaba. Brazil nuts have gained widespread popularity. Guarana is now widely consumed as an ingredient of popular energy drinks.

== Peru ==
Juane is one of the most popular dishes from the Peruvian jungle. It is widely consumed during the Catholic Feast of San Juan (St. John), held on 24 June each year. The dish was named in honor of San Juan Bautista. The dish could have a pre-Columbian origin. With the arrival of the Spanish, missionaries popularized the Biblical story of Salome, John and Herodias. Some believe the dish's name comes from the reference to the head of San Juan.

Another popular Peruvian dish from the jungle is tacacho, made from fried slices of plaintain mashed with chicharones (fried pork fat). It is usually accompanied by chorizo (fried sausage). The dish is typical of Iquitos as well as the Peruvian Amazon. It is widespread in the rest of the country. The term tacacho derives from the Quechua term taka chu, which means beaten. Tacacho consumption varies depending on the region where it is made. In Madre de Dios and San Martín, many people eat tacachos for breakfast, while in other regions, it is a dish served at lunch or dinner. In the San Martín region, tacacho is included in the Christmas dinner. In the Amazon region of Ecuador, the dish is known as bolon. It has a counterpart in the Caribbean islands, where it is called mofongo.

Peruvian chef Pedro Miguel Schiaffano has tried to highlight Amazonian cuisine and ingredients in his restaurant.
