= Tucupi =

Sauce used in Brazilian cuisine, extracted from the Cassava root

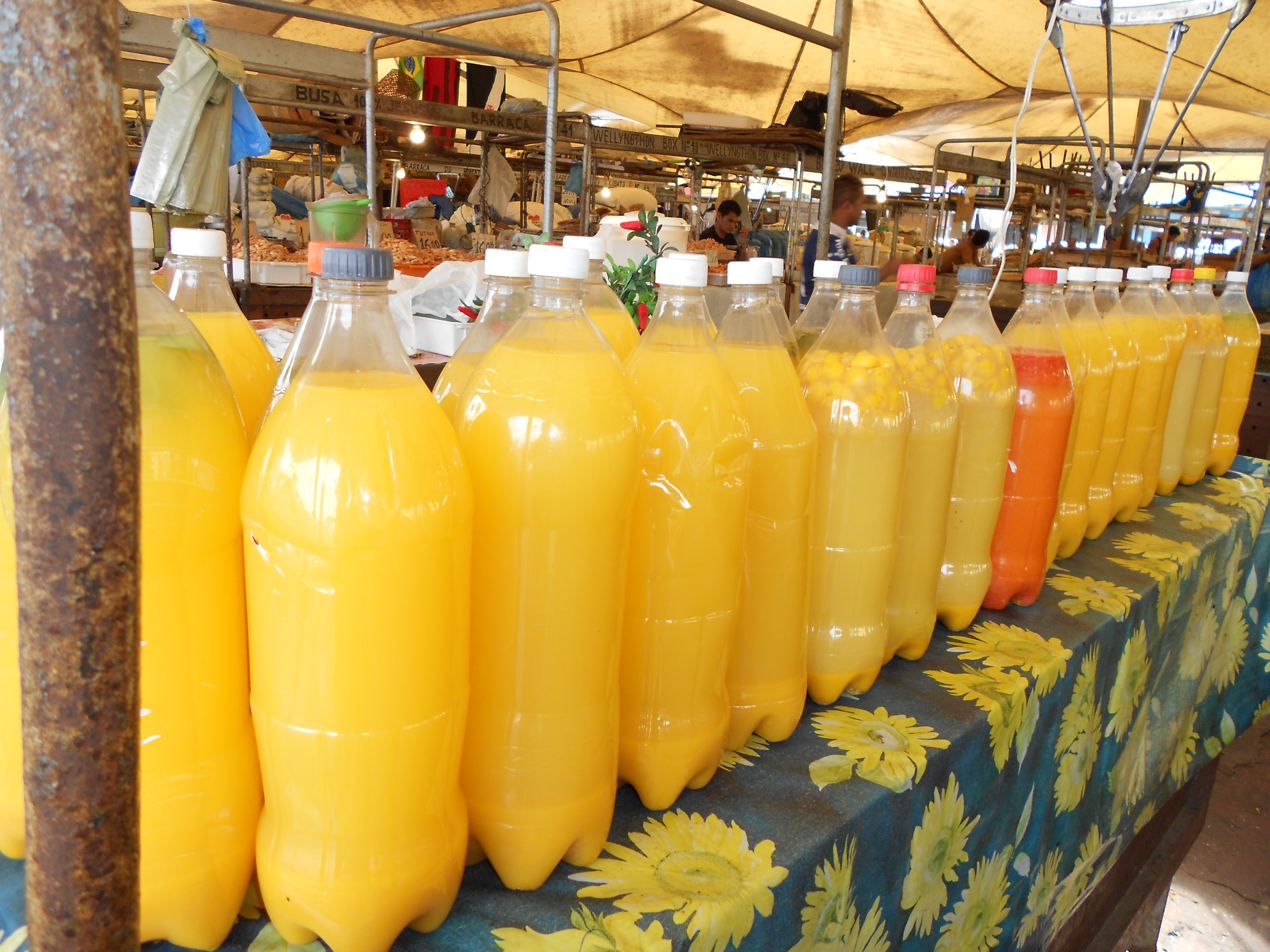
Tucupi for sale at a fair

Tucupi is a yellow sauce extracted from wild manioc root in Brazil's Amazon jungle. It is also produced as a by-product of manioc flour manufacture. The juice is toxic when raw (containing hydrocyanic acid).

Tucupi is prepared by peeling, grating, and juicing the manioc. Traditionally, a basket-like instrument called the tipiti was used. After being squeezed through the tipiti, the juice is left to "rest" so that the starch separates from the liquid (tucupi). Poisonous at this stage, tucupi must be boiled for 3 to 5 days to eliminate the poison. The tucupi can then be used as a sauce in cooking. It is seasoned with salt, alfavaca and chicória.

== Mythology ==
In legend, Jacy (The Moon) and Iassytatassú (The Morning Star) joined to visit the centre of the Earth. When they tried to cross the abyss, the serpent Tyiiba bit the face of Jacy. Jacy's tears fell on a manioc plantation. Since then the face of Jacy (The Moon) has been marked by the bites of the snake. From the tears of Jacy sprang tucupi.

== Preparations ==
Tucupi is very common in the cuisine of Brazilians of the Amazon region. Pato no tucupi ("duck in tucupi") is a much appreciated dish: a duck which has been previously roasted, and then shredded, is brought to a boil in a sauce of tucupi and jambu (Acmella oleracea).

Tacacá is another specialty of Amazonian cuisine from the state of Pará. Served in a bowl made from a gourd, boiling tucupi is poured over manioc flour. A generous portion of jambu and dried shrimp complete the dish.

The acidic nature of tucupi accentuates the effects of jambu, which cause the lips and mouth to tingle or feel numbness.

== See also ==
- Amazonian cuisine
- Brazilian cuisine
