= Piracuí =

Crushed or shredded dried salted fish

Piracuí (from tupi: pira=fish | cuí=flour) is traditionally known in the Amazon region as "farinha de peixe" (fish flour) and is traditionally made from crushed or shredded dried salted fish. The most common fishes are Acari (Liposarcus pardalis), Tamuatá (Callichthys callichthys) or Bodó, but piracuí can be made from other species of fish.

The fishes are cooked or roasted, and then the meat is separated from the carcass. The meat is toasted and is put into continuous motion in a wood burning oven with salt. The final product has a flour-like texture, and is then stored to be used in other preparations. It is eaten mixed with olive oil, onion and cassava flour. It is also used to make fried dumplings (known as bolinho de piracuí).

== See also ==
- List of dried foods
