= Pato no tucupi =

Brazilian duck dish

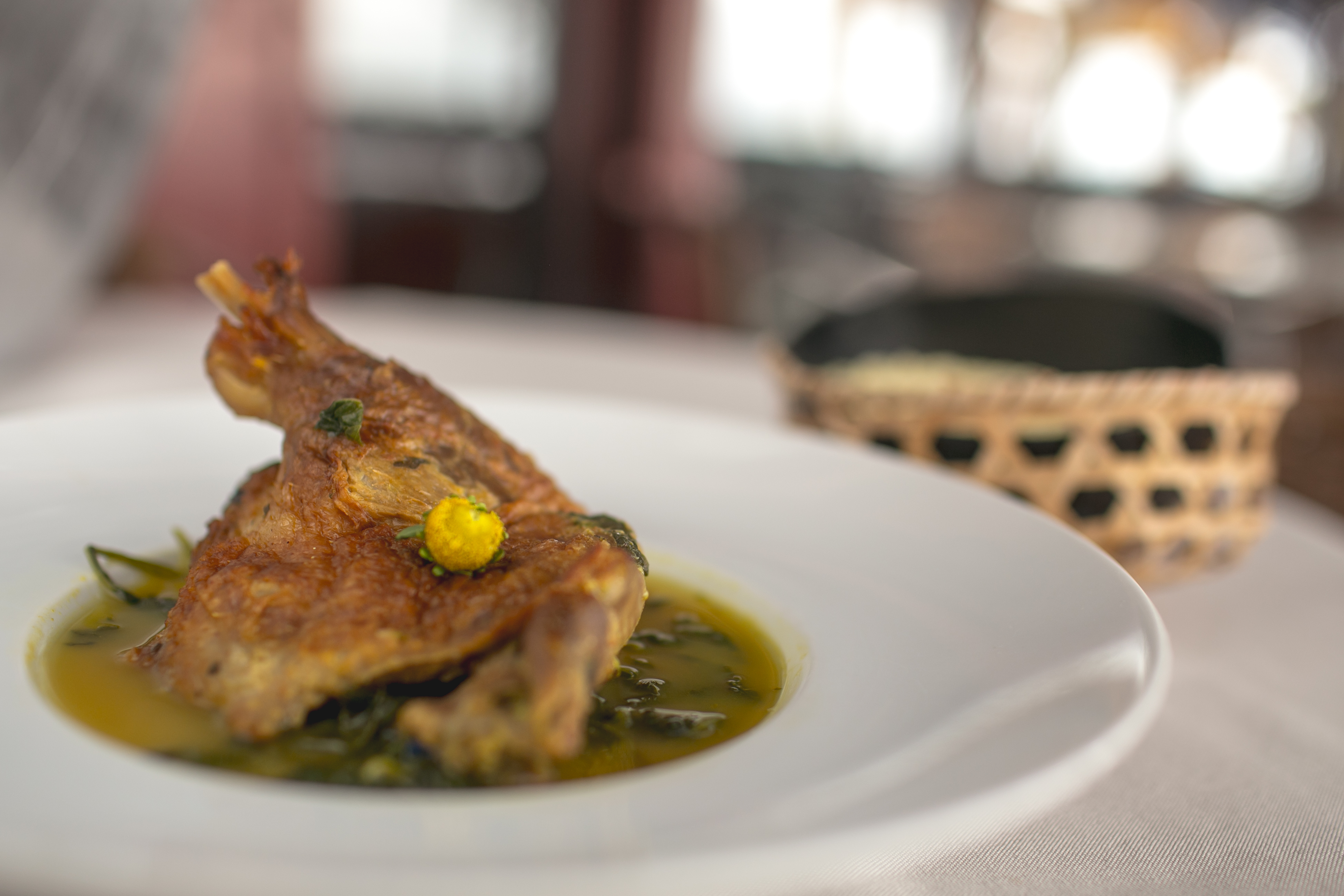
Pato no tacupi

Pato no tucupi (duck in tucupi sauce) is a traditional Brazilian dish found mostly in the area around the city of Belém in the state of Pará state. The dish consists of a boiled duck (pato in Portuguese) in tucupi.

One of the more typical restaurants where it can be found is the Círculo Militar in Belém, in a historical palace near the harbour of the city.

== Preparation ==
The dish is made with tucupi (yellow broth extracted from cassava, after the fermentation process of the broth remained after the starch had been taken off, from the raw ground manioc root, pressed by a cloth, with some water; if added maniva, the manioc ground up external part, that is poisonous because of the cyanic acid, and so must be cooked for several days). After cooking, the duck is cut into pieces and boiled in tucupi sauce for some time. The jambu is boiled in water with salt, drained, and put on the duck. It is served with white rice and manioc flour and corn tortillas.

== See also ==
- Brazilian cuisine
- Amazonian cuisine
