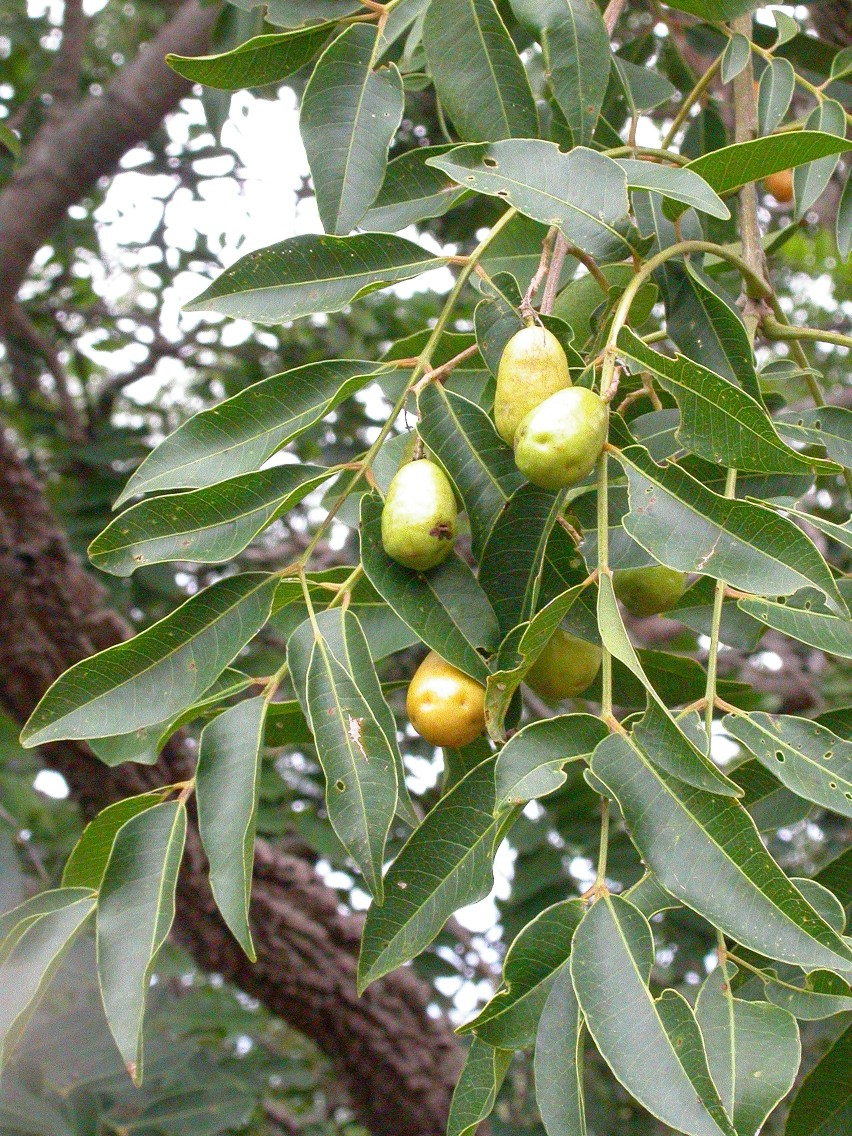
- Fruiting

Conservation status
- Least Concern (IUCN 3.1)

Scientific classification
- Kingdom: Plantae
- Clade: Tracheophytes
- Clade: Angiosperms
- Clade: Eudicots
- Clade: Rosids
- Order: Sapindales
- Family: Anacardiaceae
- Genus: Spondias
- Species: S. mombin

Binomial name
- Spondias mombin L.

Synonyms
- Spondias aurantiaca Schumach. & Thonn.; Spondias dubia A. Rich.; Spondias graveolens Macfad.; Spondias lutea L.; Spondias oghigee G. Don; Spondias pseudomyrobalanus Tussac

= Spondias mombin =

Species of tree

Spondias mombin, also known as yellow mombin, hog plum, amra or cajazeira, is a species of tree and flowering plant in the family Anacardiaceae. It is native to the tropical Americas, including the West Indies. The tree was introduced by the Portuguese in South Asia in the beginning of the 17th century. It has been naturalized in parts of Africa, India, Nepal, Bangladesh, Sri Lanka, The Bahamas, Indonesia, and other Caribbean islands. It is rarely cultivated except in parts of the Brazilian Northeast.

The mature fruit has a leathery skin and a thin layer of pulp. The seed has an oil content of 31.5%.

== Description ==
Spondias mombin also known as the hog plum is a small deciduous tree up to 20 m (66 ft) high and 1.5 m (4.9 ft) in girth, and is moderately buttressed. Its bark is thick, corky, and deeply fissured. When slashed, it is pale pink, darkening rapidly. Branches are low and branchlets are glabrous. The leaves are pinnate, with 5-8 leaflets opposite pairs with a terminal leaflet, 10 cm × 5 cm (4 in × 2 in), oblong or oblong lanceolate, broadly acuminate, glabrous. The flowers bloom January to May and are sweet-scented, in large, lax terminal panicles of small white flowers. Fruits appear July to September and are nearly 4 cm (1.5 in) long, ovoid yellow, acid, wrinkled when dry. The fruits have a sharp, somewhat acid taste and are edible. Their flesh surrounds a single spiny kernel.

== Use as food ==
The fruit pulp is either eaten fresh or made into juice, concentrate, jellies, and sherbets.

In Nepal this fruit is called Lapsi (लप्सी ) also amaaro in some other regions. This fruit pulp is mainly used for pickle called Lapsi ko achaar (लप्सीको अचार ) and also as a dried fruit called Lapsi Ko Maada (लप्सीको माड़ा ). In Thailand this fruit is called makok (Thai: มะกอก) and is used in som tam as a secondary ingredient. The young leaves, which taste slightly bitter and sour, are sometimes served raw together with certain types of nam phrik (Thai chili pastes). It is also served with chili powder in Bangladesh where the fruit is known as আমড়া (amṛa). In India, it is known as Amado in Konkani, അമ്പഴം (ambazham) in Malayalam and, omora in Assamese.

As a member of the sumac family (Anacardiaceae), exposure to the sap of this species may result in an identical allergic reaction to that of the poison ivy plant. Those with a known sensitivity to urushiol should exercise caution in consuming or handling this species.

== Traditional medicine ==
In traditional medicine, Spondias mombin has had a variety of uses. The fruit has been used as a diuretic and febrifuge. The bark is astringent and used as an emetic and for diarrhea, dysentery, hemorrhoids, gonorrhoea, and leukorrhea. The flowers and leaves are used to make a tea for stomach ache, biliousness, urethritis, cystitis, and inflammation.

== Common names ==
Spondias mombin has several common names. Throughout most of the Spanish-speaking Caribbean, Honduras, Nicaragua, Panama, and parts of Mexico it called jobo, derived from the Carib language. In Northern Mexico and most of Cuba it is called ciruela. In the Habla Congo language of the Palo Mayombe religion in Cuba, it is called nkunia guenguere kunansieto'. In Nepal it is called Amara (अमरा ). In Costa Rica it is called yuplón after the English name gully plum. In El Salvador, it is called Jocote de Corona. Among the English-speaking Caribbean islands it is known as yellow mombin or hog plum. In Jamaica it is also called Spanish plum, gully plum or coolie plum. In Suriname the fruit is called Mope. In Brazil, the fruit is known by several different names, such as cajá, taperebá and ambaló. In Peru, it is known as uvos or mango ciruelo. In Ghana, it is known as the hog plum or Ashanti plum, or Akukor in the Ewe-speaking regions. In Nigeria, the fruit is called Ughighen in the Urhobo language, Iyeye orYeye in the Yoruba language, ngulungwu in Igbo and isada in Hausa. In Somalia, it is called Isbaandhees. In Bengali, it is called Amṛa (আমড়া). In the southern Indian state of Kerala it is called Ambazhanga (അമ്പഴങ്ങ). In Kannada it is called AmateKaayi (ಅಮಟೆ ಕಾಯಿ). In Goa it is known as Ambadde. In Telugu, it is called karakkaya (కరక్కాయ). In Sri Lanka, it is called Ambaralla (ඇඹරැල්ල). In Palauan, it is called Misiedel. Other common names include hug plum, true yellow mombin, golden apple or Java plum.

== Gallery ==
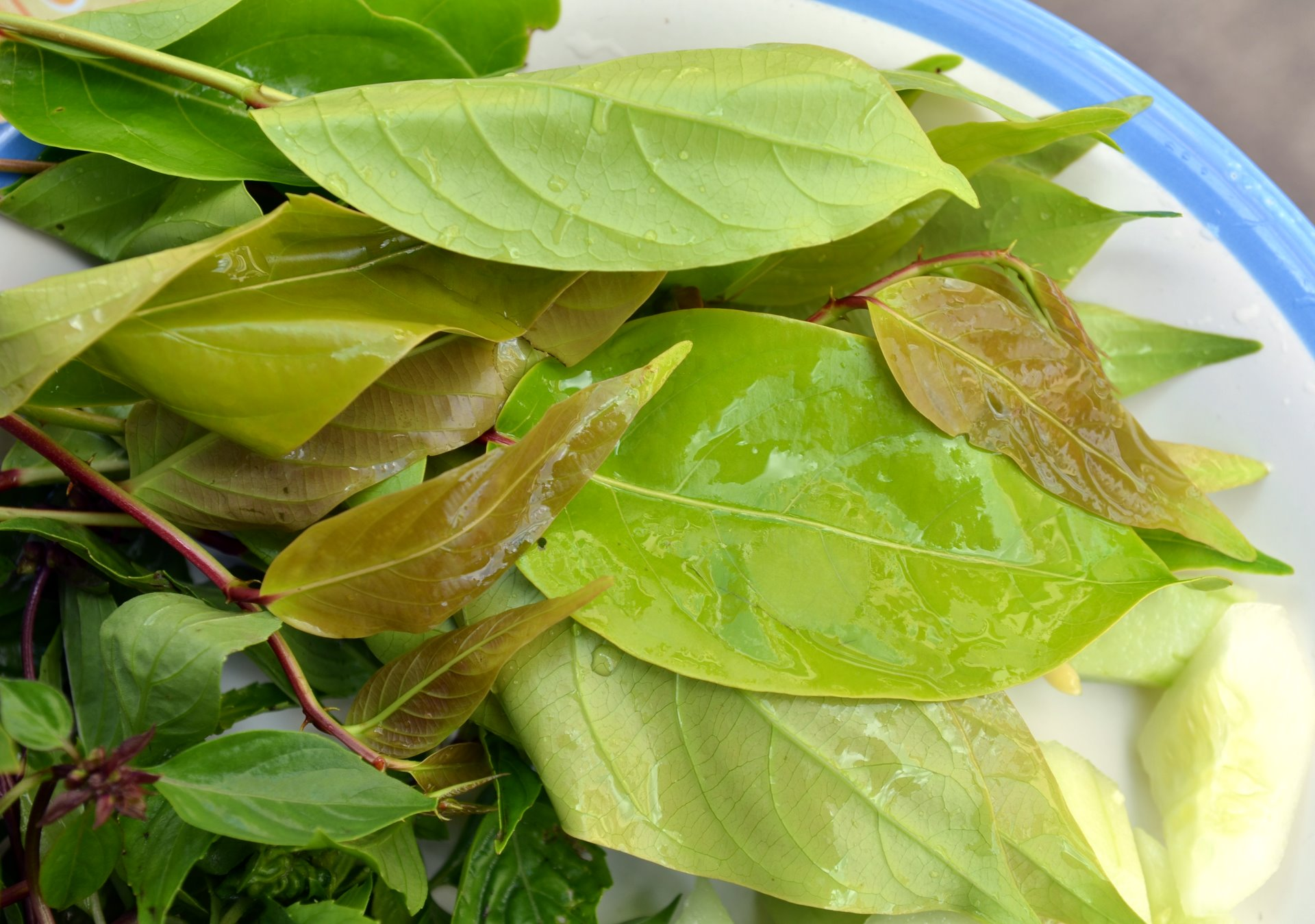
Bai makok, name for leaves of Spondias mombin in Thai

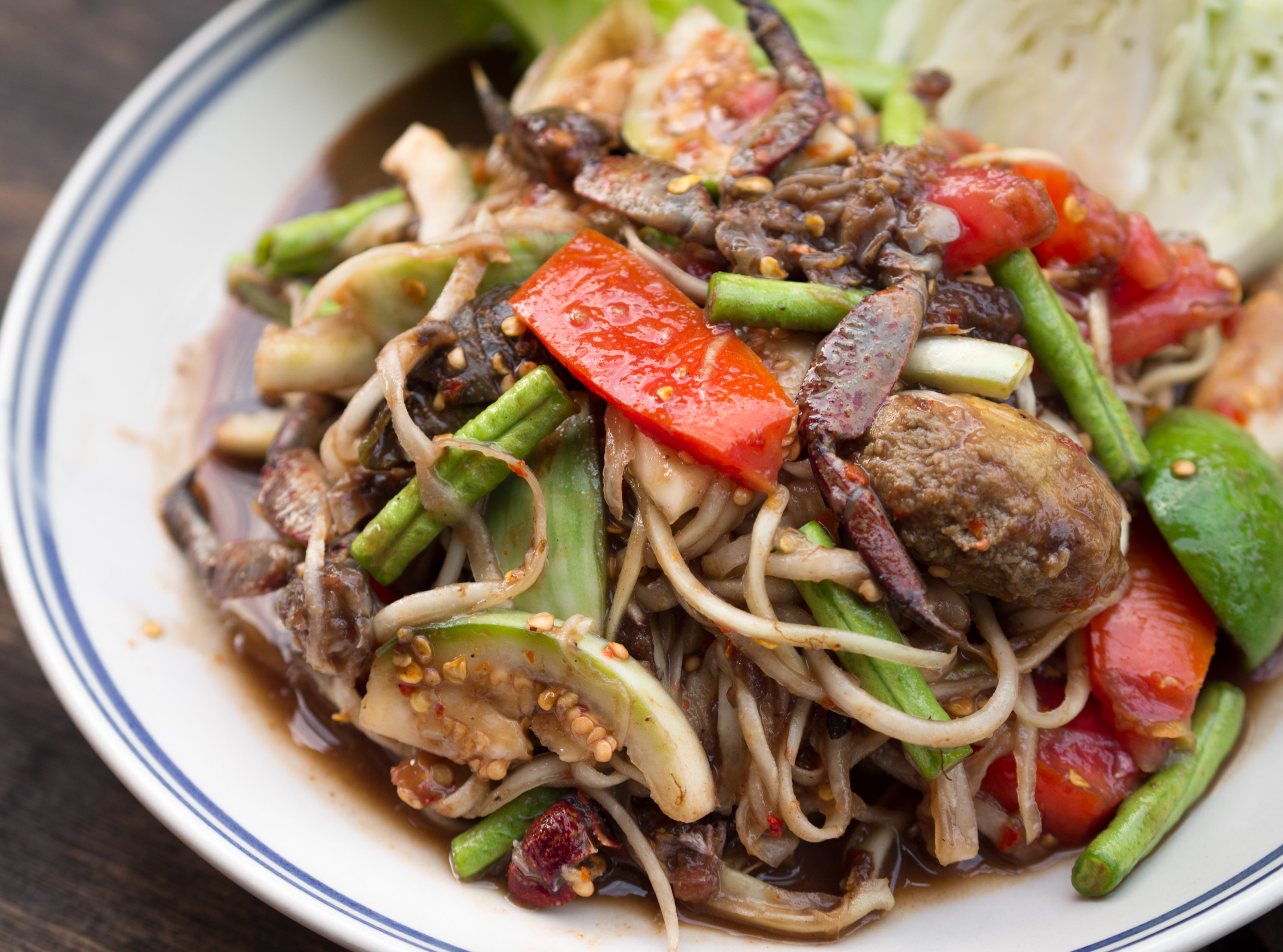
The fruit, of which the seed can easily be seen in this image, can also be used for making green papaya salad in Thailand and Laos

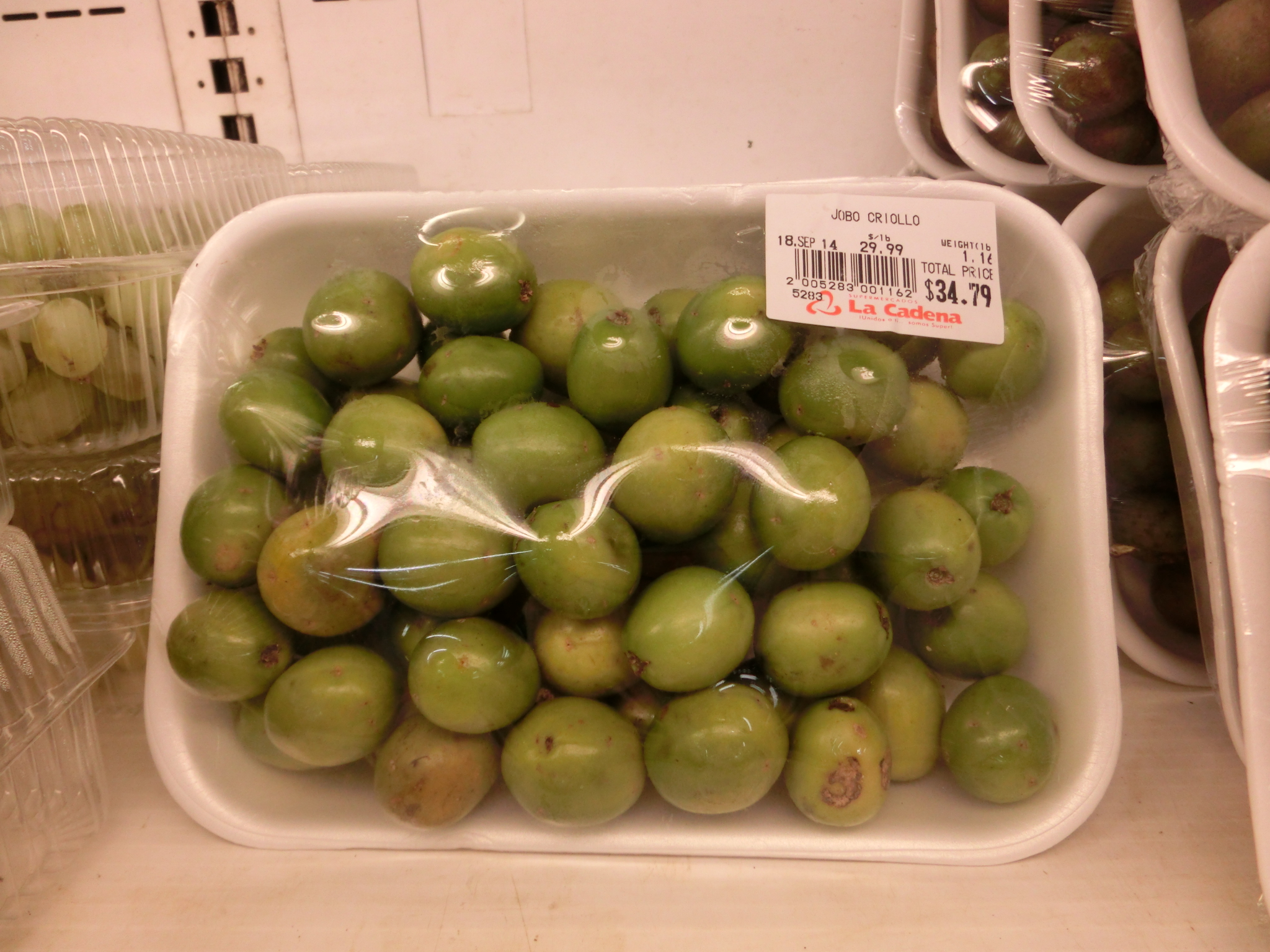
Green fruits in a supermarket in the Dominican Republic

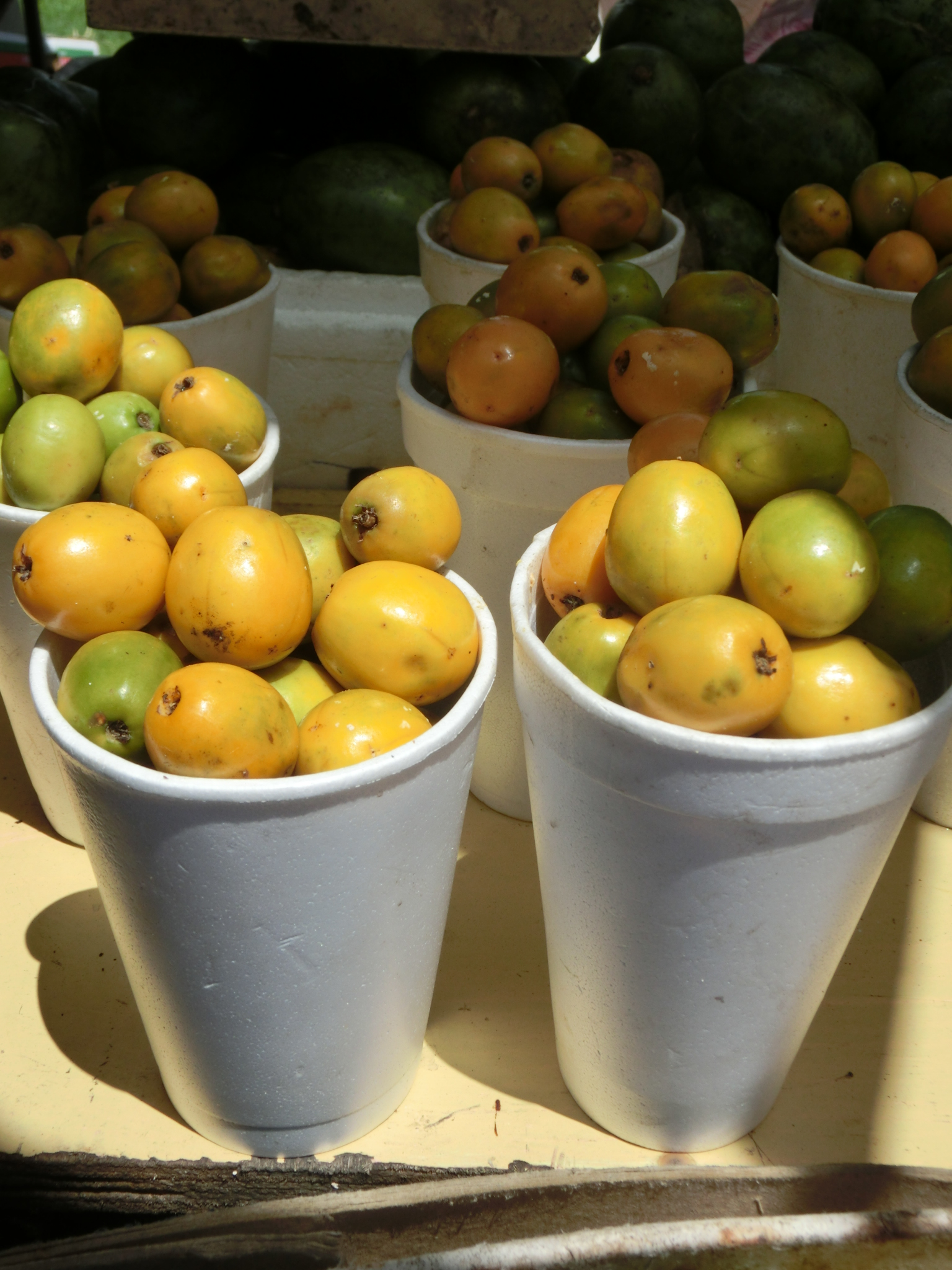
Ripe fruits

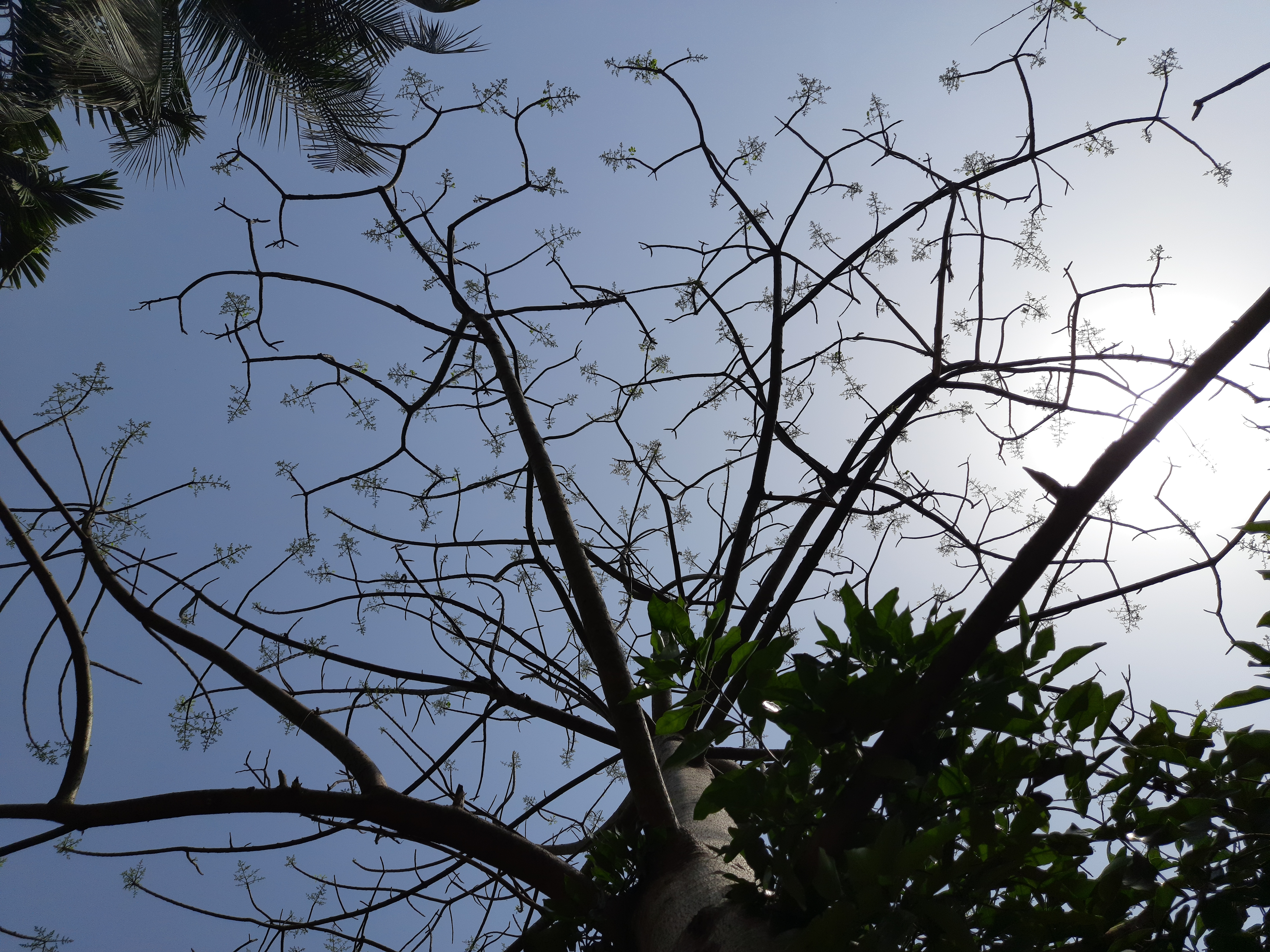
Buds

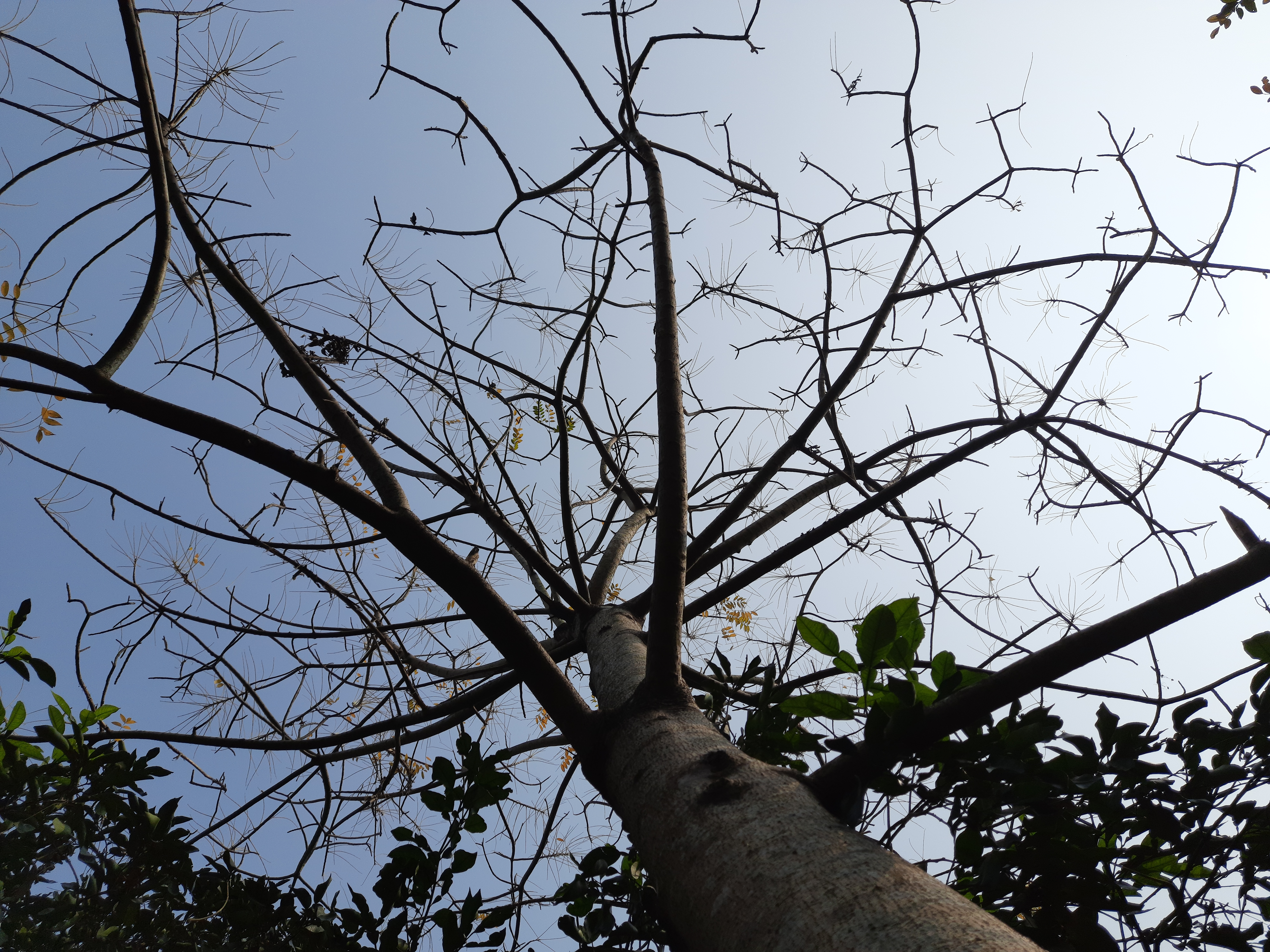
As Spondias mombin is deciduous, it loses all of its leaves for a part of the year.

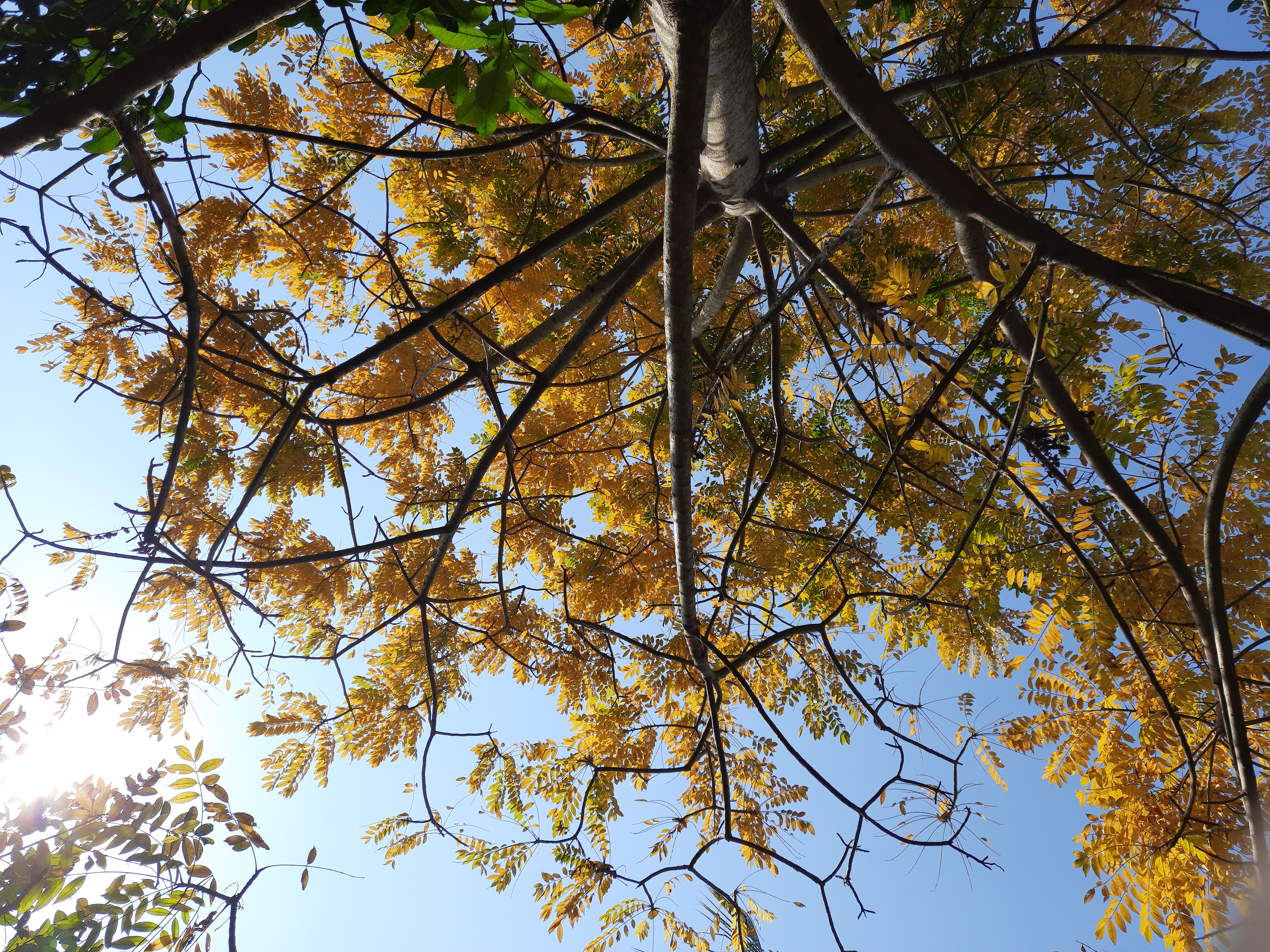
As Spondias mombin is deciduous, the leaves are turning yellow.

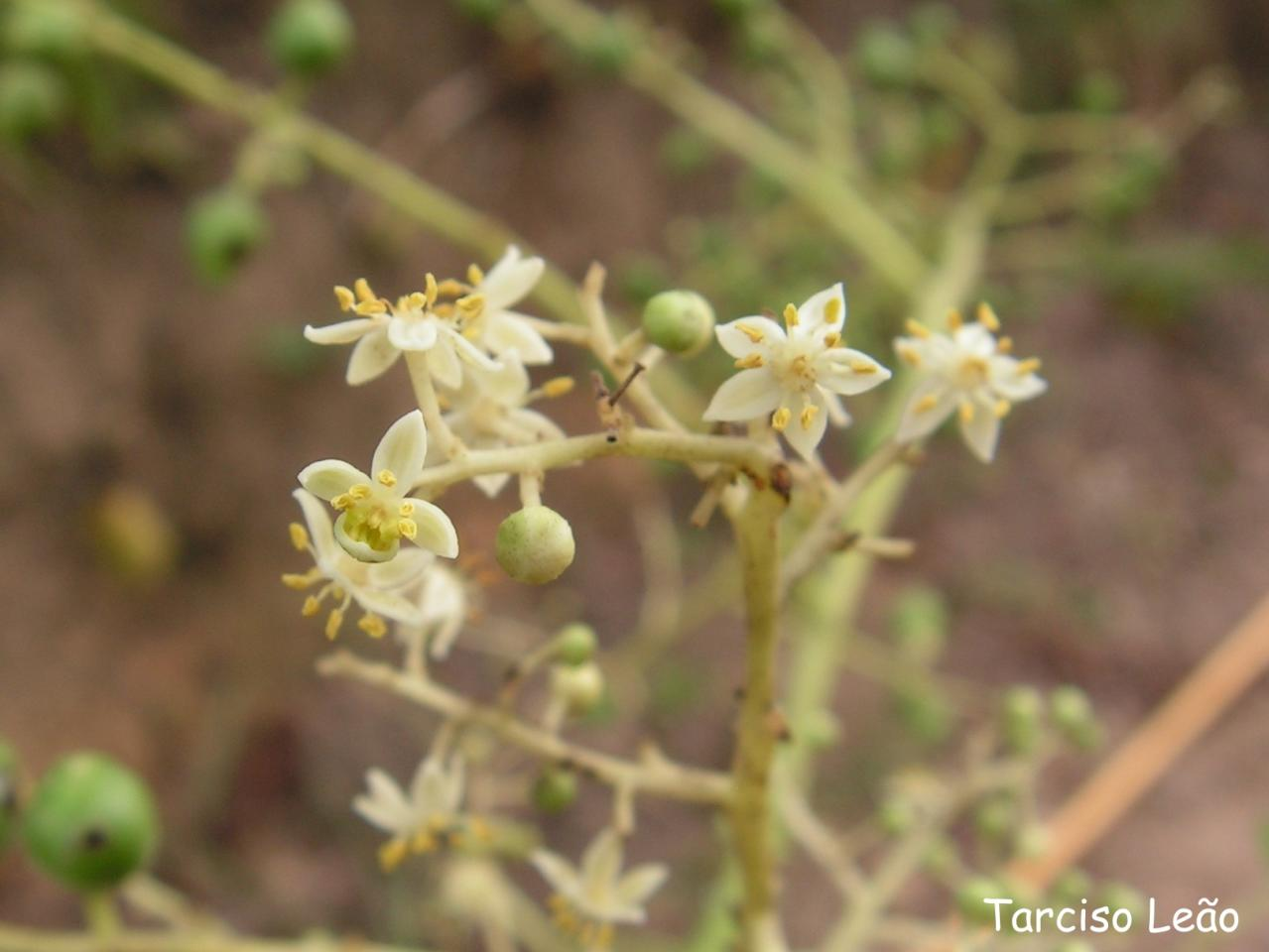
Flowers

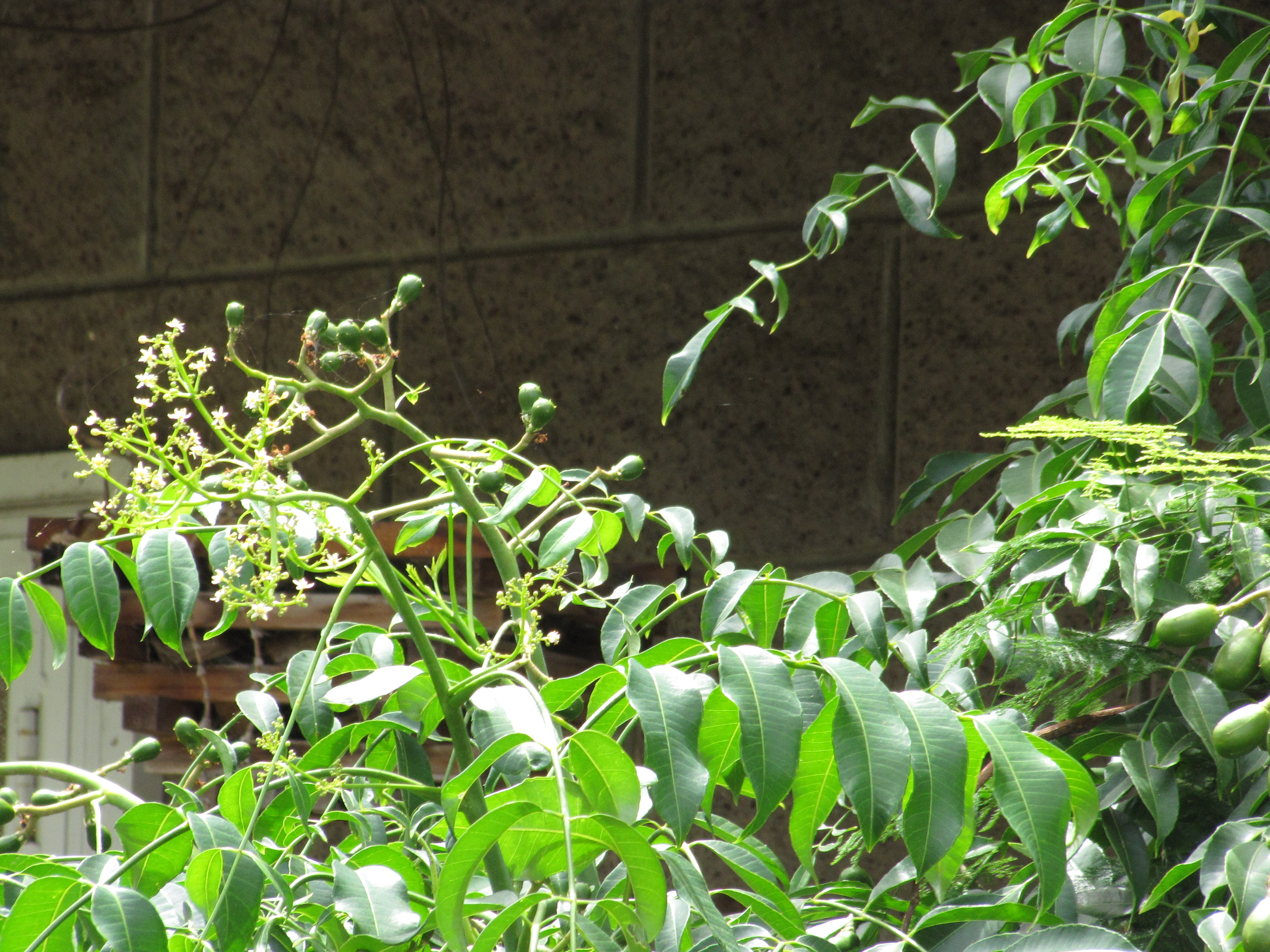
Flowers and fruits

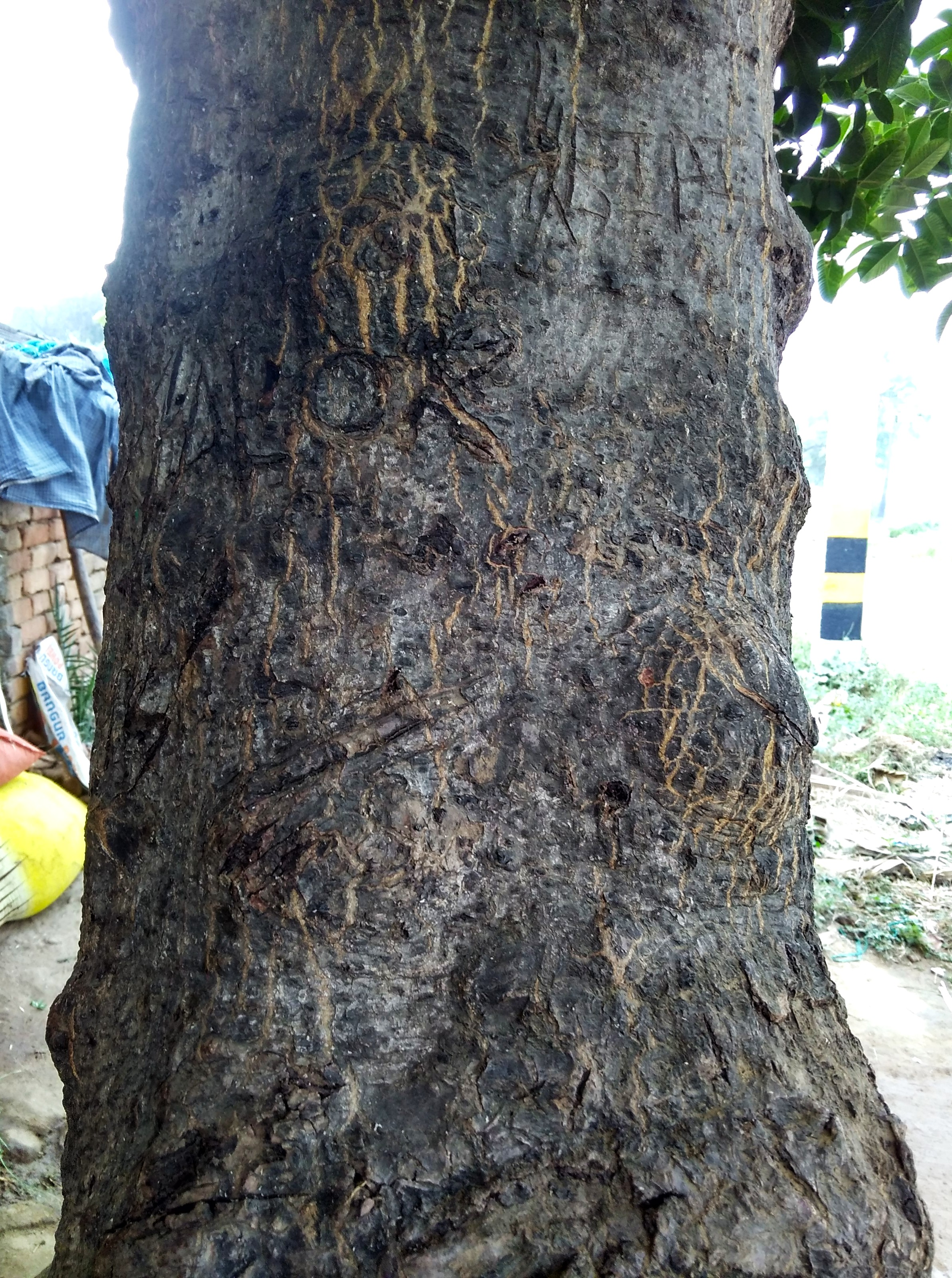
Lower trunk, Bihar, India

== See also ==
- List of plants of Cerrado vegetation of Brazil
- Amazonian cuisine
- Spondias purpurea (Purple mombin)
- Spondias tuberosa (Umbú)
- Spondias pinnata (India)
