= Spilanthol =

Names
- Preferred IUPAC name (2E,6Z,8E)-N-(2-Methylpropyl)deca-2,6,8-trienamide
- Other names Affinin

Identifiers
CAS Number	25394-57-4
3D model (JSmol)	Interactive image
ChemSpider	4509783
PubChem CID	5353001
UNII	4W9L3S4856
CompTox Dashboard (EPA)	DTXSID90893963
- InChI: InChI=1S/C14H23NO/c1-4-5-6-7-8-9-10-11-14(16)15-12-13(2)3/h4-7,10-11,13H,8-9,12H2,1-3H3,(H,15,16)/b5-4+,7-6-,11-10+ Key: BXOCHUWSGYYSFW-HVWOQQCMSA-N; InChI=1/C14H23NO/c1-4-5-6-7-8-9-10-11-14(16)15-12-13(2)3/h4-7,10-11,13H,8-9,12H2,1-3H3,(H,15,16)/b5-4+,7-6-,11-10+ Key: BXOCHUWSGYYSFW-HVWOQQCMBC
- SMILES: O=C(/C=C/CC/C=C\C=C\C)NCC(C)C

Properties
Chemical formula	C_{14}H_{23}NO
Molar mass	221.344 g·mol^{−1}
- Except where otherwise noted, data are given for materials in their standard state (at 25 °C [77 °F], 100 kPa). Infobox references

Spilanthol (affinin) is a fatty acid amide isolated from Acmella oleracea. It is believed to be responsible for the local anesthetic properties of the plant.

Spilanthol permeates the human skin and the inside lining of the cheeks in the mouth (buccal mucosa), resulting in local as well as systemic pharmacological concentrations. In the skin and in the pancreas, spilanthol has also been shown to exert anti-inflammatory effects. The underlying mechanism involves inhibition of nitric oxide production due to reduced expression of inducible nitric oxide synthase enzyme (iNOS) in macrophages. Transcription factor array experiments revealed that spilanthol inhibits the activation of several transcription factors (NFκB, ATF4, FOXO1, IRF1, ETS1, and AP-1) which may explain the effect of spilanthol on gene expression.

The antihypertensive effect of spilanthol was blocked by CB1 antagonist rimonabant and TRPV1 antagonist capsazepine, suggesting spilanthol mediates some activity by interaction with the cannabinoid receptors and TRPV1 channels.

== See also ==
- Hydroxy alpha sanshool
