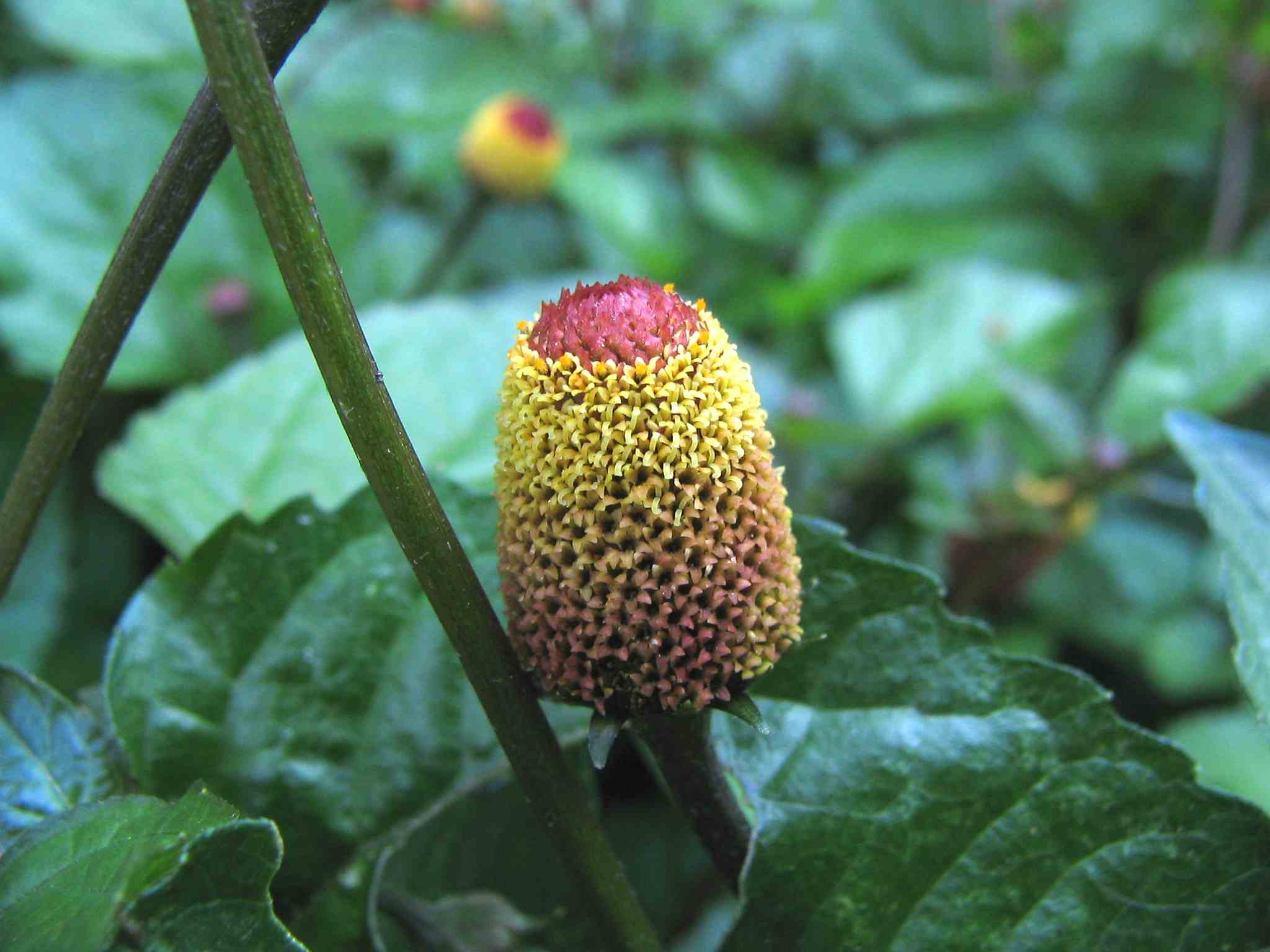

Scientific classification
- Kingdom: Plantae
- Clade: Tracheophytes
- Clade: Angiosperms
- Clade: Eudicots
- Clade: Asterids
- Order: Asterales
- Family: Asteraceae
- Tribe: Heliantheae
- Genus: Acmella
- Species: A. oleracea

Binomial name
- Acmella oleracea (L.) R.K.Jansen

Synonyms
- Spilanthes oleracea L.; Spilanthes acmella (L.) Murray not (L.) L.; Pyrethrum spilanthus Medik.; Cotula pyrethraria L.; Bidens fixa Hook.f.; Bidens fervida Lam.; Anacyclus pyrethraria (L.) Spreng.; Spilanthes radicans Schrad. ex DC.; Bidens fusca Lam.; Bidens oleracea (L.) Cav. ex Steud.; Bidens acmelloides Berg.; Spilanthes oleracea var. fusca (Lam.) DC.; Spilanthes fusca hort.par. ex Lam.; Spilanthes acmella var. oleracea (L.) C.B.Clarke ex Hook.f.

= Acmella oleracea =

Species of flowering plant

Acmella oleracea is a species of flowering herb in the family Asteraceae. Common names include toothache plant, Szechuan buttons, paracress, jambu, buzz buttons, tingflowers and electric daisy. Its native distribution is unclear, but it is likely derived from a Brazilian Acmella species. A small, erect plant, it grows quickly and bears gold and red inflorescences. It is frost-sensitive but perennial in warmer climates.

Its specific epithet oleracea means "vegetable/herbal" in Latin and is a form of holeraceus (oleraceus).

== Culinary uses ==
For culinary purposes, small amounts of shredded fresh leaves are said to add a unique flavour to salads. Cooked leaves lose their strong flavor and may be used as leafy greens; additionally, they are edible in their raw form, along with the fruit. Young branches can be cooked and eaten without concern. In Madagascar, the plant is known as anamalaho (brède mafane in Réunion Creole), and is a main ingredient in the national dish of the island, called romazava. Both fresh and cooked leaves are used in dishes such as stews like tacacá in northern Brazil, especially in the state of Pará. They are combined with chilis and garlic to add flavor and vitamins to other foods.

The flower bud has a grassy taste followed by a strong tingling or numbing sensation and often excessive salivation, with a cooling sensation in the throat. The buds are known as "buzz buttons", "Sichuan buttons", "sansho buttons", and "electric buttons". In India, they are used as flavoring in chewing tobacco.

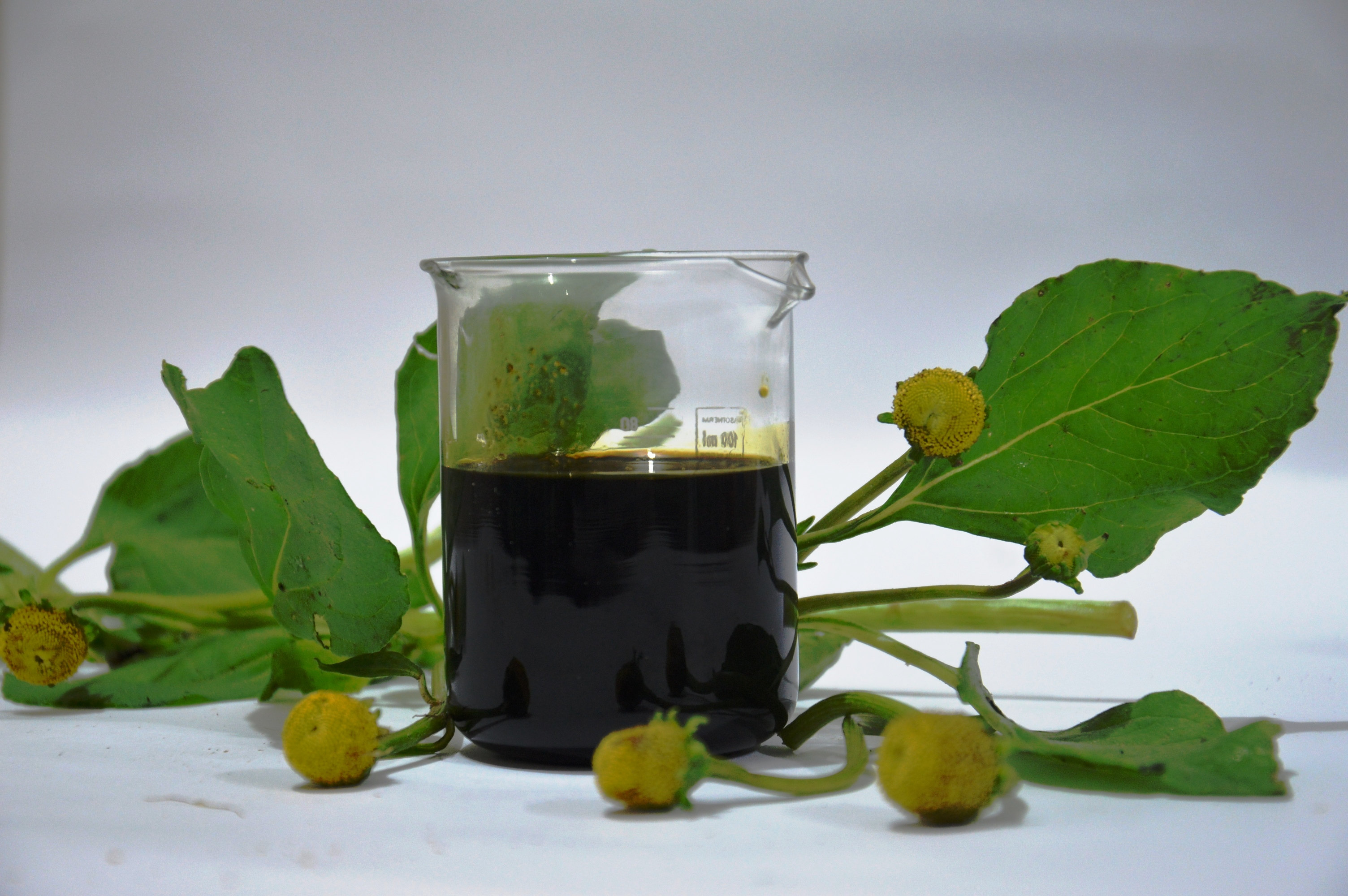
Jambu oil

A concentrated extract of the plant, sometimes called jambu oil or jambu extract, is used as a flavoring agent in foods, chewing gum, and chewing tobacco. The oil is traditionally extracted from all parts of the plant. EFSA and JECFA reviewed a feeding study in rats and both authorities recognized that the no adverse effect level for spilanthol was 572 mg/kg b.w./day, yielding a safe dose of spilanthol of 1.9 mg/kg b.w./day, or 133.5 mg/70-kg-male/day, 111 mg/58-kg-female/day, or 38 mg/20-kg-child/day.

Jambu extract as a flavoring agent is described as having a citrus, herbal, tropical or musty odor, and its taste can be described as pungent, cooling, tingling, numbing, or effervescent. Spilanthol, the major constituent of jambu extract, is responsible for the perception of a mouth-watering flavor sensation, as well as the ability to promote salivation as a sialogogue, perhaps through its astringent action or its pungent taste.

== Cultivation ==
This plant prefers well-drained, black (high organic content) soil. If starting outdoors, the seeds should not be exposed to cold weather, so start after last frost. Seeds need direct sunlight to germinate, so should not be buried.

== Active chemicals ==
Spilanthol: (2E,6Z,8E)-deca-2,6,8-trienoic acid isobutyl amide

(2E,7Z,9E)-Undeca-2,7,9-trienoic acid isobutyl amide, another alkylamide from Acmella oleracea

(2E)-Undeca-2-en-8,10-diynoic acid isobutyl amide

The most important taste-active molecules present are fatty acid amides such as spilanthol, which is responsible for the trigeminal and saliva-inducing effects of the plant. It also contains stigmasteryl-3-O-b-D-glucopyranoside and a number of triterpenes. The isolation and total synthesis of the active ingredients have been reported.

== Biological pest control ==
Extracts were bioassayed against yellow fever mosquito (Aedes aegypti) and corn earworm moth (Helicoverpa zea) larvae. The spilanthol proved effective at killing mosquitoes, with a 24-hour LD_{100} of 12.5 μg/mL, and 50% mortality at 6.25 μg/mL. The mixture of spilanthol isomers produced a 66% weight reduction of corn earworm larvae at 250 μg/mL after 6 days.

== See also ==
- Sichuan pepper
