= Maniçoba =

Brazilian pork dish

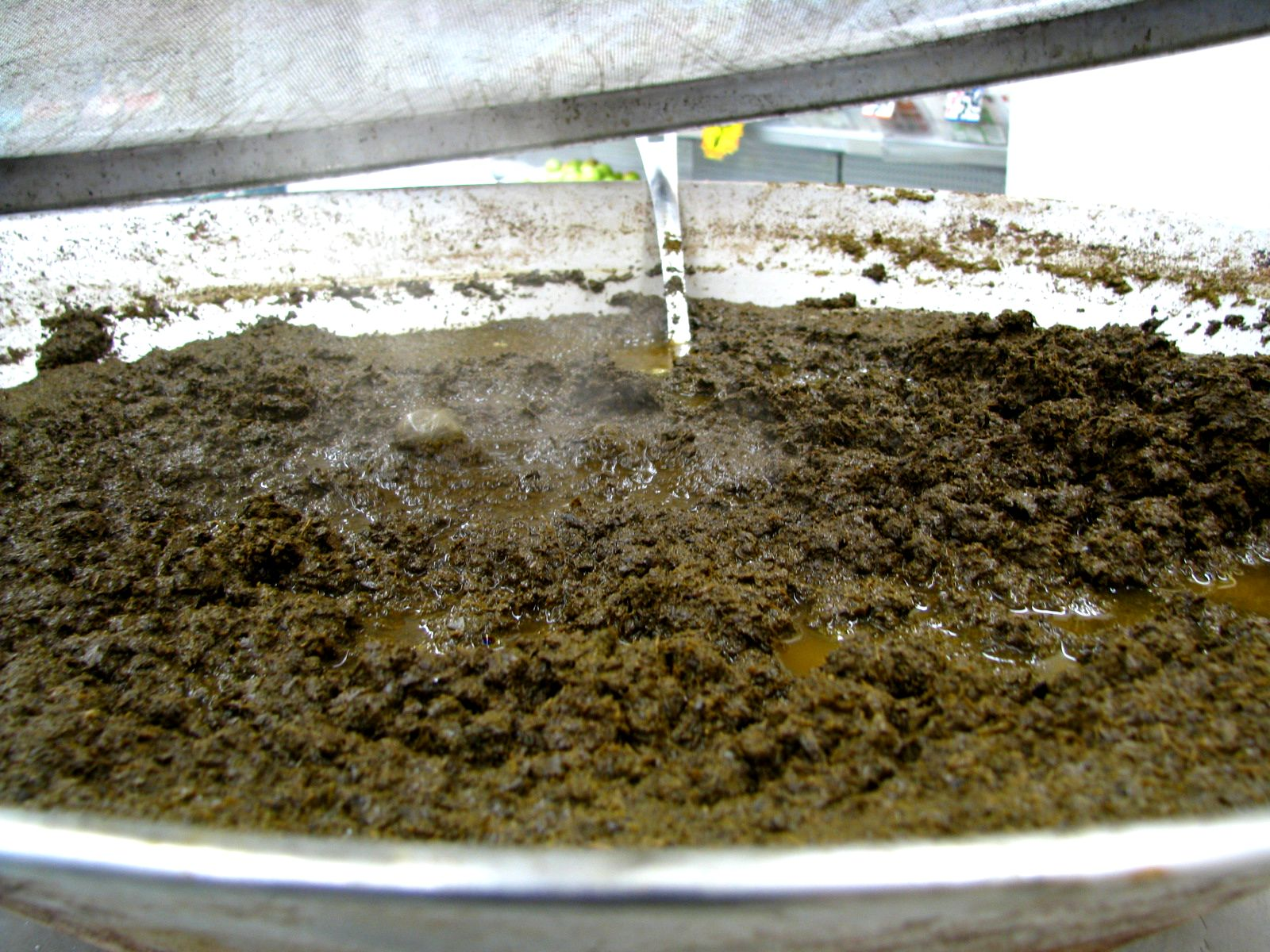
- Region or state: Pará
- Associated cuisine: Brazilian cuisine

Maniçoba is a dish in Brazilian cuisine that is from the Brazilian state of Pará located in the Brazilian Amazon. It is of indigenous origin, and is made with leaves of the Manioc plant that have been finely ground and boiled for at least four days and up to a week, to remove their hydrogen cyanide content. The ground and boiled leaves (maniva) are then mixed with salted pork, dried meat and other smoked ingredients, such as bacon and sausage. The dish is served with rice and cassava meal (farinha). Maniçoba is usually eaten during the Círio de Nazaré, a religious festival that takes place in October in the city of Belém.

In Sergipe, the Museum of the people of Sergipe mentions the importance of maniçoba for the cities of Lagarto and Simão Dias, a tradition passed from father to son, starting with a local merchant named João Mendes and passing to his son Rildo Mendes, known as Gordinho da Maniçoba (the maniçoba fatty), where maniçoba is a traditional dish of festivities.

== See also ==
- List of Brazilian dishes
