= Tacacá =

Soup traditionally eaten in northern Brazil

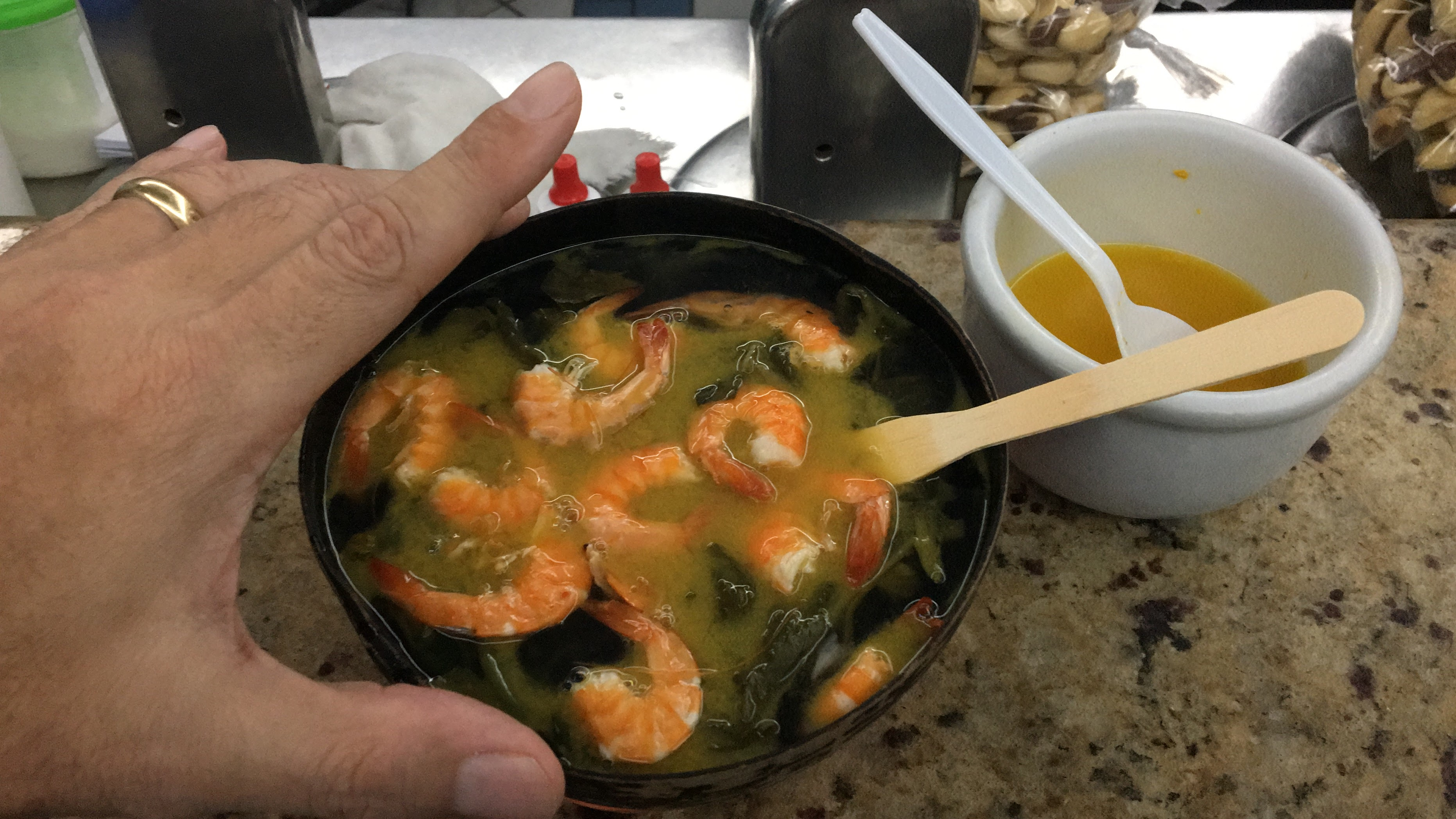
- Type: Soup
- Place of origin: Brazil
- Region or state: Northern Brazil
- Serving temperature: Hot
- Main ingredients: Jambu (paracress), tucupi (broth with wild manioc), dried shrimps, yellow peppers

Tacacá (Brazilian Portuguese: [taka'ka]) is a typical dish of northern Brazil, mostly consumed in Pará, Amazonas, Acre, Amapá and Roraima. It is made with jambu (a native variety of paracress), tucupi (a broth made with wild manioc), goma de tapioca cooked tapioca gum (also manioc-based), and dried shrimp. It is traditionally served hot in a bowl made from an Amazonian gourd known as cuia.

== See also ==
- List of Brazilian dishes
- List of soups
