= List of Brazilian dishes =

This is a list of dishes found in Brazilian cuisine. Brazilian cuisine was developed from Portuguese, African, Native American, Spanish, French, Italian, Japanese and German influences. It varies greatly by region, reflecting the country's mix of native and immigrant populations, and its continental size as well. This has created a national cuisine marked by the preservation of regional differences. Brazil is the largest country in both South America and the Latin American region. It is the world's fifth largest country, both by geographical area and by population, with over 202,000,000 people.

== Appetizers ==
Name	Image	Description
Abará		Abará uses the same dough, made from black-eyed peas, as acarajé, the only difference is that the abará is steamed, while acarajé is fried.
Aberém		A typical cuisine of Bahia, Aberém is a cookie of African-Brazilian origin, made from corn or rice that is stone ground, macerated in water, salted and cooked in dried banana leaves.
Acarajé		Made from peeled black-eyed peas formed into a ball and then deep-fried in dendê (palm oil). It is found in Brazilian cuisine and Nigerian cuisine. The dish is traditionally encountered in Brazil's northeastern state of Bahia, especially in the city of Salvador, often as a street food.
Acaçá		A steamed porridge of coconut milk and rice flour
Arabu		A typical Brazilian dish consisting of raw (or slightly cooked) turtle eggs, accompanied by cassava flour and seasoned with some salt.
Arrumadinho		Made with cassava or jerky, farofa, vinaigrette, green beans and seasoned with clarified butter
Bauru		A popular Brazilian sandwich. The traditional recipe calls for cheese (usually mozzarella) melted in a bain-marie, slices of roast beef, tomato and pickled cucumber in a French bun with the crumb (the soft inner part) removed.
Bolacha sete-capas		Composed of seven thin layers of a dough consisting of wheat flour, coconut milk, butter or margarine and hydrogenated vegetable fat.
Bolinho		Varieties include bolinho de bacalhau, bolinho de chuva, bolinho caipira, cheese balls, student cake and manioc cake.
Broa		A type of cornbread traditionally made in Portugal and Galicia, as well as in Brazil, where it is traditionally seasoned with fennel.
Cabeça de galo		Originating from northeastern Brazil, particularly the states of Pernambuco and Paraíba, it consists of a broth of cassava flour with eggs and spices (especially pepper) and may contain other ingredients such as tomato and onion.
Cabidela		Made with poultry or rabbit. After the fowl or rabbit is killed, they are hung up upside-down, so the blood may be captured as it drains out. The rice is then cooked together with the meat and the blood of the animal, which imparts a greyish-brown color to the dish.
Cachorro-quente		In Brazil, hot dogs are typically served in a bread roll with a tomato-based vegetable broth, corn, and potato sticks.
Catupiry		One of the most popular "requeijão" (processed cheese) brands in Brazil. It was developed by the Italian immigrant Mario Silvestrini in the state of Minas Gerais in 1911.
Chana		Chickpeas
Coxinha		"Little chicken thigh" – a popular food in many countries in South America. The drumstick is a Brazilian snack originally from São Paulo, and based on dough made with wheat flour and chicken broth, which is filled with spiced chicken meat.
Coxinha de farofa		A typical snack from Lapa, it is made by covering chicken meat farofa with pastel dough and molded in a shape that resembles a straw.
Deep-fried cassava		Fried cassava (mandioca, aipim, or macaxeira) is a typical substitute for French fries in Brazil. It is commonly served in bars along with beer.
Farofa		A toasted manioc flour mixture. In Brazil, where farofa is particularly popular, typical recipes call for raw manioc flour to be toasted with butter, salt, and bacon until golden brown, being incremented with numerous other ingredients. It is an essential accompaniment to feijoada. Variants include farofa d'água, farofa de içá and farofa de tanajura.
Ginga com tapioca		A traditional food in Natal, Rio Grande do Norte, made of fried fish and served inside Brazilian tapioca.
Misto-quente		It's a simple ham and cheese sandwich in sliced bread, with or without butter. Can be served quente (pressed hot) or frio (just mounted and served).
Pamonha		A traditional Brazilian food, it's a paste made from fresh corn and milk, boiled wrapped in corn husks, turned into a dumpling. Variations include pamonha de milho and pamonha de carimã, and some variants use coconut milk.
Pão de queijo		A small, baked, cheese-flavored roll/bun/puff. It's a very popular snack and breakfast food all over Brazil, but especially in the state of Minas Gerais. These cheese puffs are distinctive not only because they are made of cassava or corn flour, but also because the inside is chewy and moist with a crumbly crust around.
Pastel		A fast food dish consisting of thin pastry envelopes wrapped around assorted fillings, then deep fried in vegetable oil, resulting in a brown, crisp pastry. The most common fillings are ground meat, mozzarella, heart of palm, catupiry cream cheese, chicken and small shrimp. Variants include pastel de angu.
Queijo de coalho		A firm and lightweight cheese produced in Northeastern Brazil, with an almost 'squeaky' texture when bitten into. It is a popular snack on the beach in Brazil, where walking vendors brown rectangular slabs of it in hand-held charcoal ovens.
Queijo Minas		A type of cheese that has been traditionally produced in the Brazilian state of Minas Gerais. It comes in three varieties, named frescal (fresh), meia-cura (slightly matured) and curado (matured). A fourth variety, branded queijo padrão (standard cheese) has been developed more recently and can be found in nearly all supermarkets and grocery stores in Brazil.
Quibebe		A winter squash soup originating from Northeastern Brazil.
Requeijão		A milk-derived product similar to cream cheese, produced in Brazil. It's a spread that resembles ricotta in colour and flavour, but much creamier.
Rissole		In Brazil, rissoles are often filled with sweetcorn, cheese, chicken or shrimp. See below, salgados.
Salgado or salgadinho		Many different kinds of finger food which can be small (for parties) or bigger (for bakeries, as snacks and even replacing meals), usually consisting of dough wrapped around chopped meat, chicken, ham and/or cheese.
Tapioca		A starch extracted from Manioc (Manihot esculenta). This species is native to the Northeast of Brazil but spread throughout the South American continent. The plant was spread by Portuguese and Spanish explorers to most of the West Indies, Africa and Asia, including the Philippines and Taiwan, being now cultivated worldwide. In Brazil, the plant (cassava) is named "mandioca", while its starch is called "tapioca".
Torresmo		Pork rinds. See also: Chicharrón.

=== Additional appetizer dishes ===
- Azul Marinho
- Brote
- Canudinho
- Cartola
- Cocorote
- Espetinho
- Encapotado
- Folhado
- Filós
- Joelho
- Pão de frios
- Pão sapecado
- Little rolls
- Mariola
- Mentira
- Mexido
- Pé-de-Moça
- Quebra-queixo
- Queijo do Reino
- Queijo manteiga
- Sequilho
- Broinha
- Sobá
- Sorda

== Side dishes ==
Name	Image	Description
Angu		A side dish consisting primarily of cooked cornmeal and water. Broth is sometimes used.
Biscoito de polvilho		Savoury snack made of manioc flour. They have a crispy, aerated texture with a salty and slightly sour flavour. Usually shaped as either rings or sticks. Typically found in large packets at fuel stations.
Green beans		The unripe plant of specific cultivated varieties of the common bean, Phaseolus vulgaris.

== Main courses or entrées ==
Name	Image	Description
Baião de dois		A Brazilian dish made of rice, beans and other ingredients. Its origin is the state of Ceará traditionally served with seafood, or dried meat.
Bobó de camarão		A Brazilian dish of shrimp in a purée of manioc meal, coconut milk and other ingredients. Like many similar dishes, it is flavored with palm oil, called dendê in Brazilian Portuguese and is traditionally served with white rice, but may also be treated as a standalone side dish.
Caldeirada		A Portuguese fish stew consisting of a wide variety of fish and potatoes, along with other ingredients. Variants include caldeirada de Camarão and caldeirada de Peixe. In Brazil, it has been described as an aromatic chowder of river fish and cilantro.
Carne-de-sol		Portuguese for "sun-dried meat", literally "meat of sun"), also called jabá ([ʒaˈba]) is a dish from Northeastern Brazil. It consists of heavily salted beef, which is exposed to the sun for one or two days to cure.
Caruru		Made from okra, onion, shrimp, palm oil and toasted nuts (peanuts and/or cashews). It is a typical condiment in the northeastern state of Bahia
Chouriço doce		A blood sausage prepared with pig blood, brown sugar or honey, cashew nuts and spices
Churrasco		In Brazil, churrasco is the term for a barbecue (similar to the Argentine and Uruguayan asado). It uses a variety of meats, pork, sausage and chicken which may be cooked on a purpose-built "churrasqueira", a barbecue grill, often with supports for spits or skewers. A churrascaria is a restaurant serving grilled meat, many offering as much as you can eat: the waiters move around the restaurant with the skewers, slicing meat onto the client's plate.
Arroz de coco (coconut rice)		A dish prepared by soaking white rice in coconut milk or cooking it with coconut flakes.
Cuscuz		In Brazil, the traditional couscous is made from cornmeal. A variant is cuscuz branco.
Feijoada		A stew of beans with beef and pork, similar to the French Cassoulet and the Portuguese Feijoada and other former Portuguese colonies' versions of the dish.
Galinhada		A stew of rice with chicken, which is a typical Brazilian dish in the state of Goiás.
Maniçoba		a festive dish in Brazilian cuisine, especially from the Amazonian region, it is of indigenous origin, and is made with leaves of the Manioc plant, salted pork, dried meat, and smoked ingredients, such as bacon or sausage.
Mocotó		Made from cow's feet, stewed with beans and vegetables. The name is derived from the Tupi "mbokotó".
Moqueca		Seafood stew, in two regional variants: Moqueca baiana and Moqueca Capixaba. The baiana version is from the State of Bahia and uses Palm oil, and the capixaba version is from the State of Espirito Santo and uses Olive Oil.
Pato no tucupi		A traditional Brazilian dish found mostly in the area around the city of Belém in the state of Pará state. The dish consists of a boiled duck (pato in Portuguese) in tucupi.
Piracuí		Traditionally known in the Amazon region as farinha de peixe (fish meal) and is traditionally made from a dried, ground fish known as bodó.
Arroz e feijão (rice and beans, "rice and peas")		Different regions have different preferences. In Brazil, black beans are more popular in Rio de Janeiro, Rio Grande do Sul and Santa Catarina, while in most other parts of the country these are mostly only used in feijoadas.
Sarapatel		A dish of Portuguese origin now commonly cooked in the coastal Konkan region of India, primarily Goa and Mangalore (by Goan Catholics), and in northeastern Brazil. Ingredients include meat and offal of pork, but sometimes beef.
Sopa de mondongo		From Latin America and the Caribbean, this is a soup made from diced tripe (the stomach of a cow) slow-cooked with vegetables such as bell peppers, onions, carrots, cabbage, celery, tomatoes, cilantro, garlic or root vegetables.
Tacacá		A soup common to North Brazil, particularly the states of Acre, Amazonas, Rondônia and Pará. It is made with jambu (a native variety of paracress), and tucupi (a broth made with wild manioc), as well as dried shrimps and small yellow peppers.
Tucupi		A yellow sauce extracted from wild manioc root in Brazil's Amazon jungle. It is also produced as by-product of manioc flour manufacture. The juice is toxic when raw (containing hydrocyanic acid).
Vatapá		Prepared with bread, shrimp, coconut milk, finely ground peanuts and palm oil mashed into a creamy paste. This food is very popular in the North and Northeast, but it is more typical in the northeastern state of Bahia where it is commonly eaten with acarajé.

=== Additional main course dishes ===
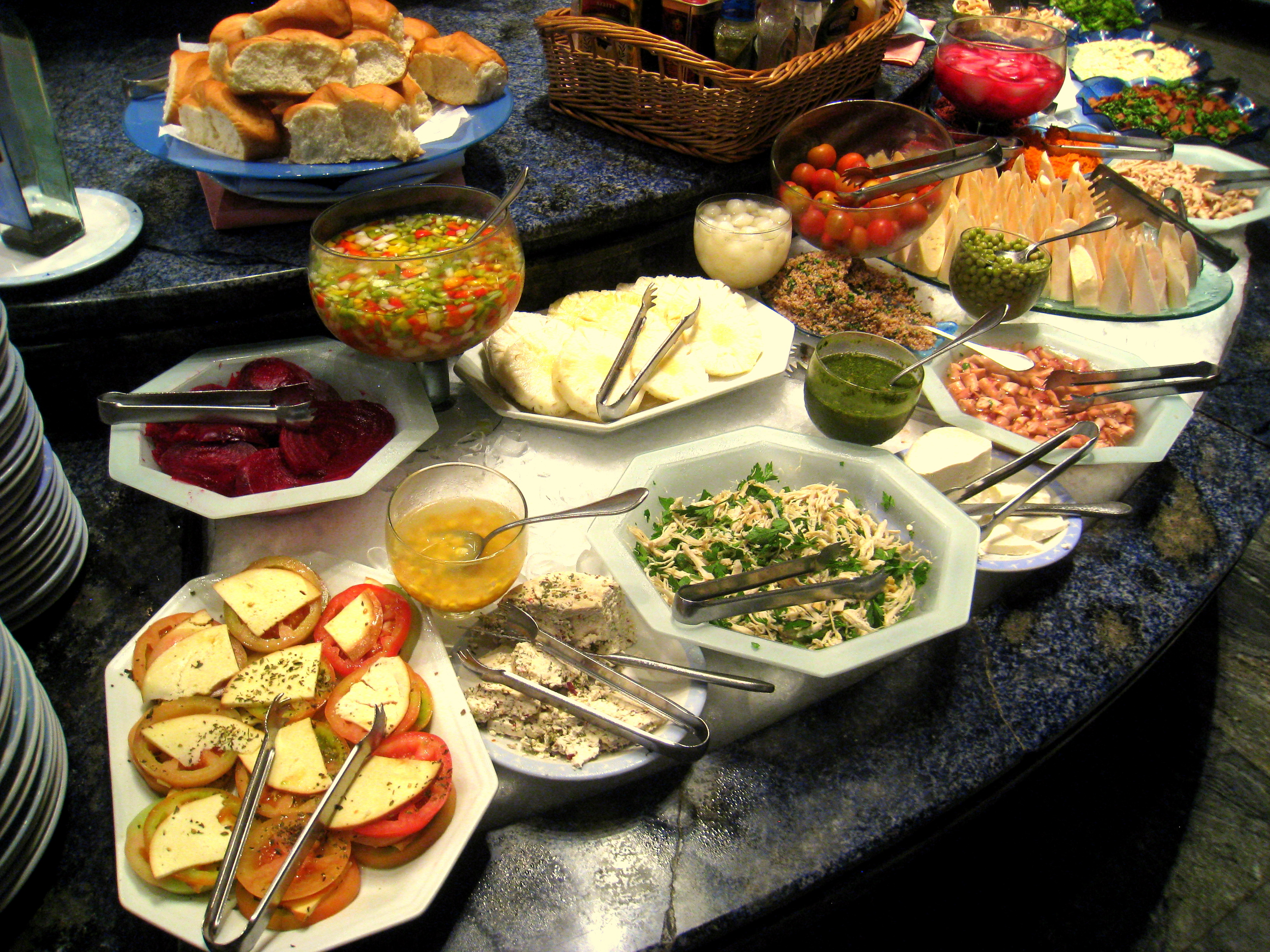
Brazilian cuisine

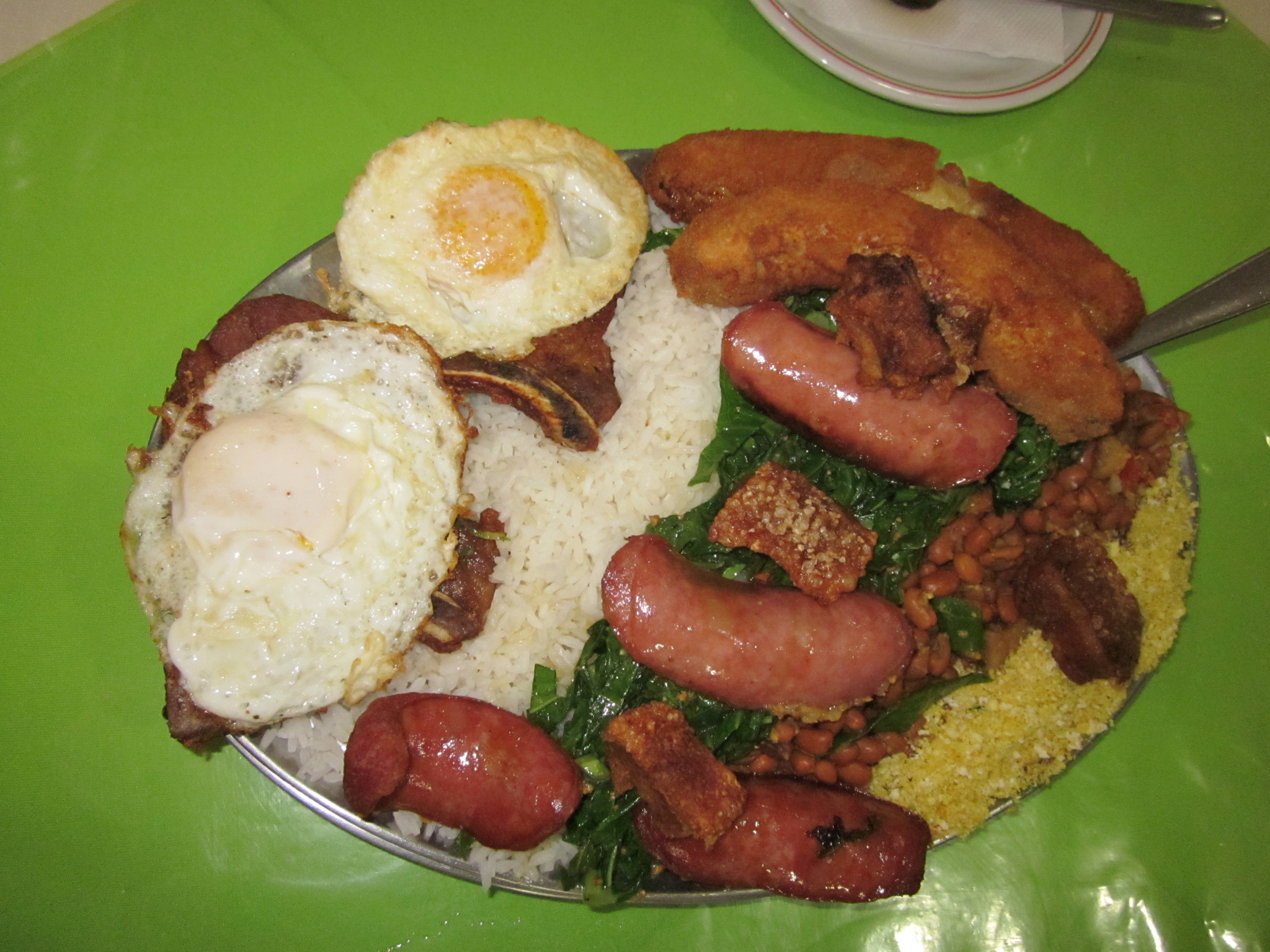
Virado a paulista

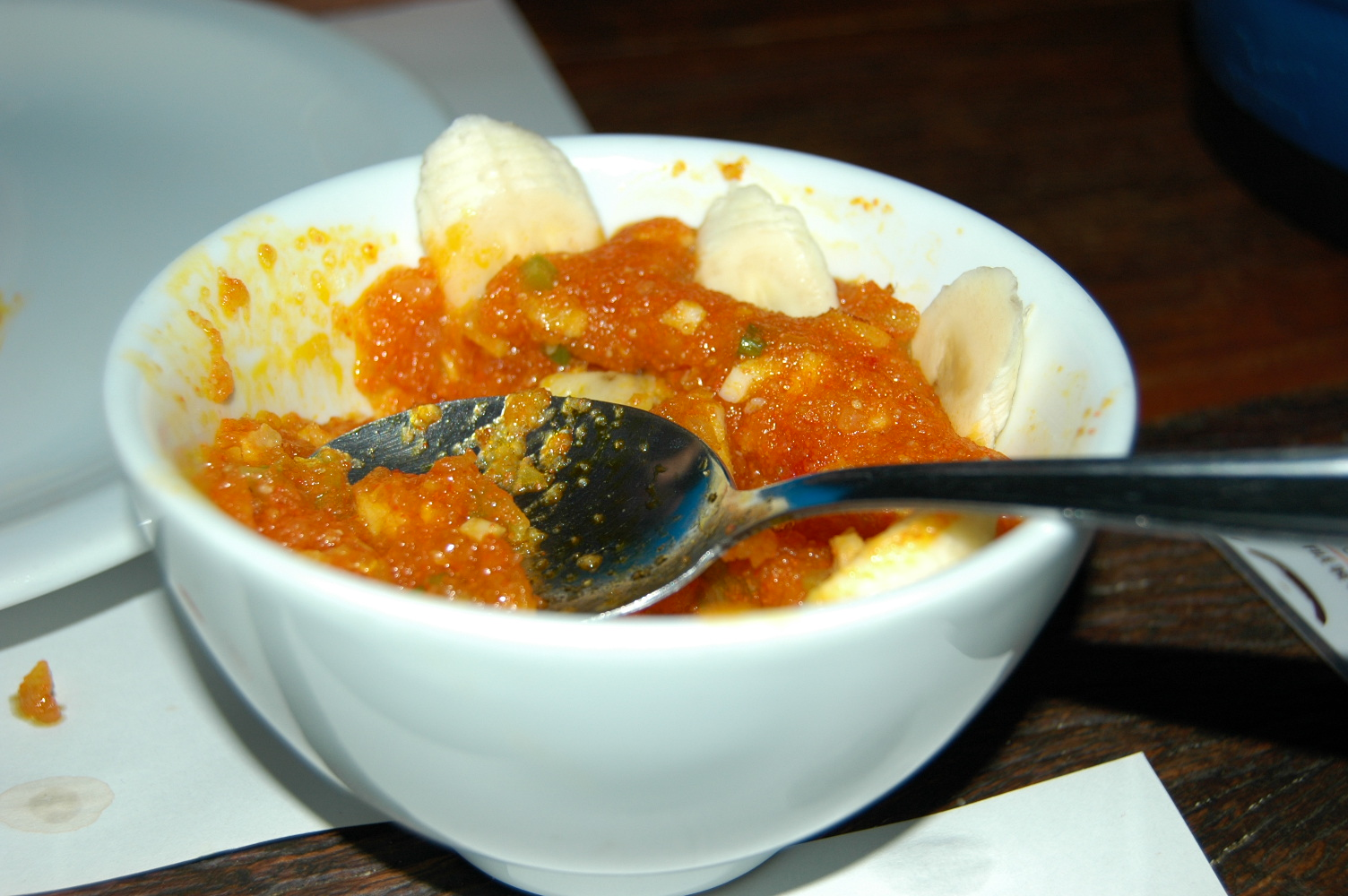
Pirão with banana

- Afogado
- Arroz de hauçá
- Baião de dois
- Banana angu
- Barreado
- Bogged cow
- Buchada de bode
- Caribéu
- Carneiro no buraco
- Carreteiro rice
- Cashew soup
- Chica doida
- Coconut fava
- Costela no bafo
- Cozido com pirão
- Cuxá
- Escondidinho
- Estrogonofe (de carne ou de frango)
- Frango à passarinho
- Frango com quiabo
- Frango de cabidela
- Fubá suado
- Galinha cheia
- Gamba de couve
- Gembê
- Leitão maturado
- Lelê
- Maria-isabel
- Milk rice
- MIninico
- Mojica
- Mujeca
- Muma de siri
- Oven rice
- Panelada
- Party rice
- Paxicá
- Peixada catarinense
- Peixe na telha
- Picadinho
- Picado
- Piranha soup
- Pirão
- Pirarucu de casaca
- Porco no rolete
- Pururuca

- Leitão à pururuca

- Quarenta
- Quinhapira
- Quirera com suã
- Rabada
- Rubacão
- Sarrabulho
- Shrimp pumpkin
- Sururu
- Tropeiro beans
- Tutoo
- Xerém
- Xinxim de galinha

June Harvest Festival Foods (Comidas Típicas de São João)

• Canjica

• Mungunzá

• Bolo de milho

• Pamonha

• Bolo de mandioca

• Cuscuz com charque

• Curau de milho

• Paçoquinha de colher

• Pé de moleque

• Bolo Souza Leão

• Quindim

• Arroz Doce (rice pudding made with cinnamon sticks)

• Cocada

• Maria mole

• Queijadinha

• Tapioca de coco

• Quebra queixo

• Doce de abóbora

• Doce de batata doce

• Quentão (warm alcoholic beverage)

== Sweets ==
Name	Image	Description
Beijinho		Beijinho ("Branquinho" in Rio Grande do Sul) is a typical Brazilian birthday party candy prepared with condensed milk and grated desiccated coconut or milk powder. It's the coconut version of the Brazilian brigadeiro. When rolled, it can be covered with granulated sugar or grated coconut. Traditionally a single dried clove is stuck in the top of the candy.
Brigadeiro		Brigadeiro ("Negrinho" in Rio Grande do Sul) is a simple Brazilian chocolate bonbon usually served at birthday parties and also as dessert, made by mixing sweetened condensed milk, butter and cocoa powder together, covered in granulated chocolate.
Doce de leite		A traditional Latin American sweet made of milk and sugar. It can be consumed as a thick spread or as a solid cut into cubes.
Mousse de maracujá		A mousse made with passion fruit pulp and seeds.
Paçoca		It's the name of two very different Brazilian foods. In Northeastern Brazil, especially in Fortaleza, Ceará, and in Rio Grande do Norte, paçoca is the name of a dish made of carne de sol (sun-dried beef), cassava flour and red onions, ground together in a mortar (pilão). In other regions of Brazil, paçoca is actually a candy made of ground peanuts and sugar pressed together.
Pamonha		A traditional Brazilian food, it's a paste made from fresh corn and milk, boiled wrapped in corn husks, turned into a dumpling. Variations include pamonha de milho and pamonha de carimã, and some variants use coconut milk.
Pé-de-moleque		Peanut brittle is a traditional candy made of mixing roasted, peeled or macerated peanuts with melted brown sugar, jaggery, molasses or rapadura.
Pudim		Milk pudding, egg pudding, or flan—this custard dessert with caramel sauce is commonly prepared in Brazil.
Quindim		Quindim is a Brazilian baked custard made chiefly from sugar, egg yolks and ground coconut.
Rabanada		A sweet version of French toast, covered with sugar and powdered cinnamon. It is usually served at Christmas.
Romeu e Julieta		"Romeo and Juliet"—Minas cheese with goiabada
Sweet rice		Brazilian sweet rice or rice pudding is prepared with milk, sometimes coconut milk, sugar, condensed milk, and cinnamon.
Tareco		A tough biscuit, make of wheat flour, eggs and sugar; that, when put into the oven, cook into a disk shape.

== Beverages ==
Name	Image	Type	Description
Cachaça		Alcoholic beverage	Cachaça (also widely known as pinga or caninha) is a distilled spirit made from sugarcane juice. It's the most popular distilled alcoholic beverage in Brazil. Outside Brazil, cachaça is used almost exclusively as an ingredient in tropical drinks (cocktails with cachaça), with the caipirinha being the most famous cocktail.
Caipirinha		Alcoholic beverage	Brazil's national cocktail made with cachaça (sugar cane hard liquor), sugar, lime, and pieces of ice. Cachaça is Brazil's most common distilled alcoholic beverage. Both rum and cachaça are made from sugarcane-derived products. Specifically with cachaça, the alcohol results from the fermentation of sugarcane juice which is then distilled.
Cajuína		Soft drink	A non-carbonated drink made from blended cashew apples
Chimarrão		Herbal drink	A herbal drink made from soaking dried yerba mate (Ilex paraguariensis) leaves in hot water. The drink originates from the Guaraní people and Tupi people, and is known as kaʼay in Guaraní.
Guaraná		Soft drink	A soft drink made from the guaraná plant.
Guaraná Jesus		Soft drink	A soft drink made from the guaraná plant, especially popular in São Luís. Currently owned by Coca-Cola.
Itubaína		Soft drink	A soft drink best known for its tutti-frutti flavor, produced by Heineken Brasil.

== See also ==
- Amazonian cuisine
- List of Brazilian drinks
- List of Brazilian sweets and desserts
