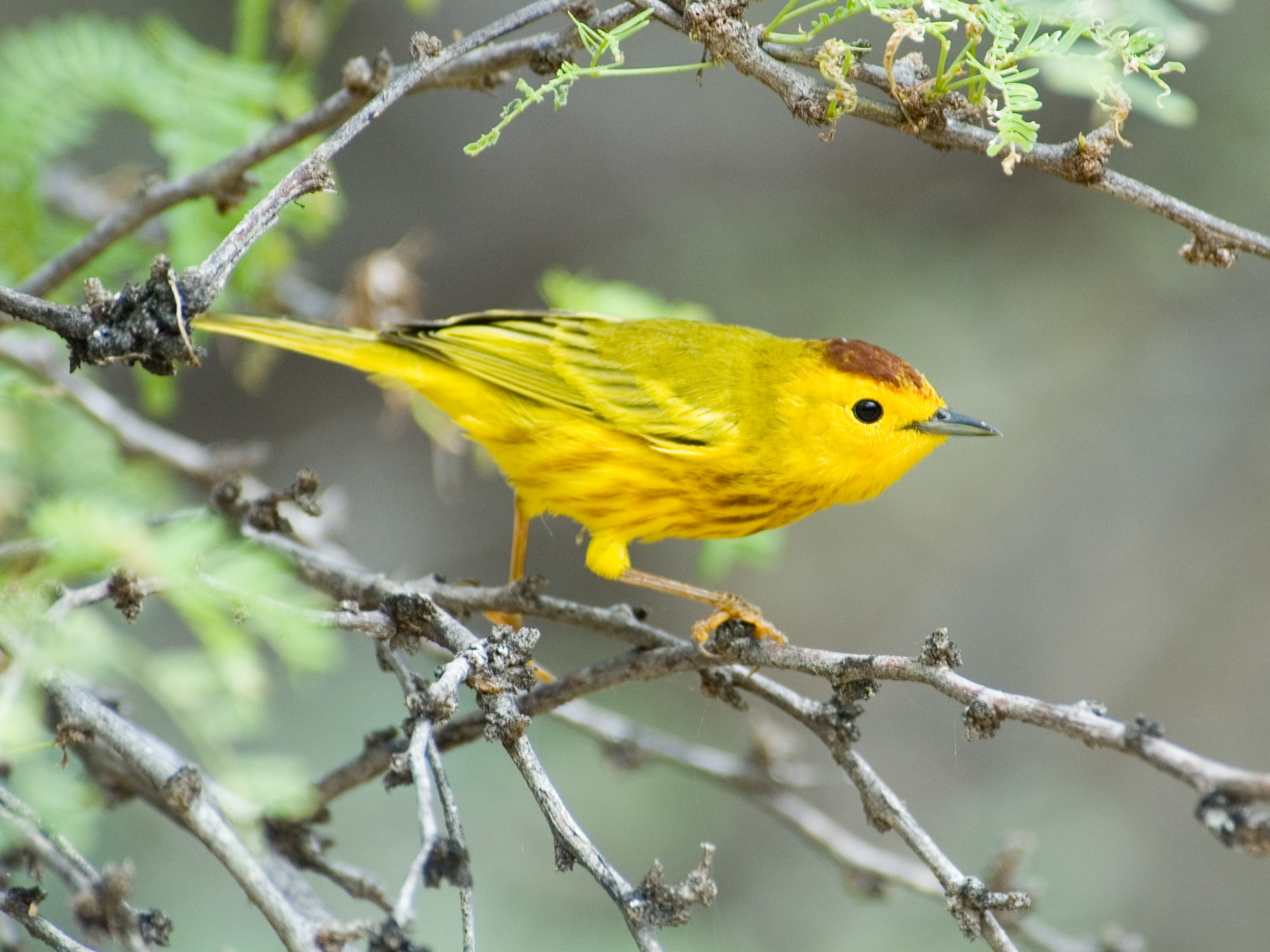
- Male of subspecies Setophaga petechia rufopileata, Bonaire, Leeward Antilles

Conservation status
- Least Concern (IUCN 3.1)

- Secure (NatureServe)

Scientific classification
- Kingdom: Animalia
- Phylum: Chordata
- Class: Aves
- Order: Passeriformes
- Family: Parulidae
- Genus: Setophaga
- Species: S. petechia

Binomial name
- Setophaga petechia (Linnaeus, 1766)
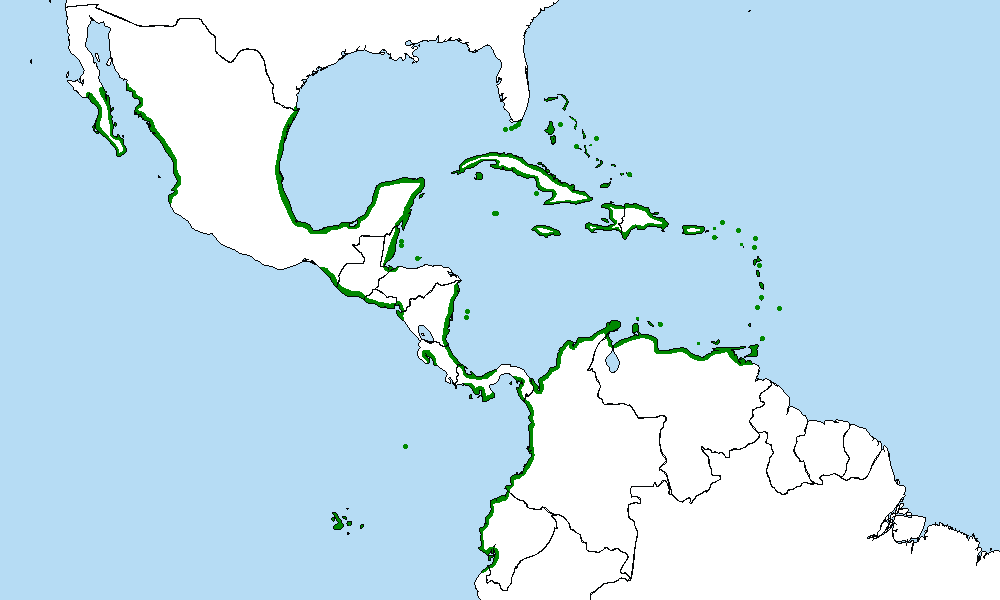
- Range

Synonyms
- Dendroica petechia; Motacilla petechia (protonym)

= Mangrove warbler =

Species of bird

The mangrove warbler or mangrove yellow warbler (Setophaga petechia) is a New World warbler species. It a small bright yellow bird that is found in mangroves on the Atlantic and Pacific coasts of the tropical Americas. It is also present in the Caribbean and on the Galápagos Islands. It was formerly considered to be conspecific with the migratory American yellow warbler (Setophaga aestiva).

== Taxonomy ==
The mangrove warbler was formally described in 1766 by the Swedish naturalist Carl Linnaeus in the twelfth edition of his Systema Naturae under the binomial name Motacilla petechia. The specific epithet petechia is from the Italian word petecchia "a small red spot on the skin". Linnaeus based his account on the "yellow-red pole" that had been described and illustrated in 1758 by the English naturalist George Edwards in his book Gleanings of Natural History. Edwards had obtained a specimen from the midwife Sidney Kennon. Edwards was unsure of the provenance of the specimen but in 1935 the Austrian ornithologist Carl Eduard Hellmayr designated the island of Barbados. The mangrove warbler is now placed in the genus Setophaga that was introduced by the English naturalist William Swainson in 1827. The genus name Setophaga combines the Ancient Greek σης/sēs, σητος/sētos meaning "moth" with -φαγος/-phagos meaning "-eating".

The mangrove warble was formerly considered to be conspecific with the migratory American yellow warbler (Setophaga aestiva). The two species were split based on differences in mitochondrial DNA sequences, as well as differences in the plumage and vocalization.

The Avilist accepts 34 subspecies:

- S. p. oraria (Parkes, KC & Dickerman, RW, 1967) – mangroves of eastern Mexico (southern Tamaulipas to western Tabasco)
- S. p. bryanti (Ridgway, R, 1873) – mangroves of Yucatán Peninsula to Belize and Costa Rica
- S. p. erithachorides (Baird, SF, 1858) – Atlantic coast of Panama and Caribbean coast of northern Colombia
- S. p. chrysendeta (Wetmore, A, 1946) – northeastern Colombia (Guajira Peninsula) and northwestern Venezuela (Zulia)
- S. p. paraguanae (Phelps, WH Sr & Gilliard, ET, 1941) – northwestern Venezuela (Paraguaná Peninsula of Falcón)
- S. p. cienagae (Zimmer, JT & Phelps, WH Sr, 1944) – northern Venezuela (coastal Carabobo and Aragua) and offshore islands
- S. p. castaneiceps (Ridgway, R, 1885) – mangroves of coastal southern Baja California (south of latitude 27°N)
- S. p. rhizophorae (Van Rossem, AJ, 1935) – mangroves of northwestern Mexico (Sonora to Nayarit); winters to Oaxaca
- S. p. phillipsi (Browning, MR, 1994) – western Mexico to Honduras (Note: Subspecies not included in the 2025 release of the Clements Checklist.)
- S. p. xanthotera (Todd, WEC, 1924) – Pacific coast of western Guatemala to Costa Rica
- S. p. aithocorys (Olson, SL, 1980) – southwestern Panama and Coiba
- S. p. iguanae (Olson, SL, 1980) – Iguana Island (off southern Panama)
- S. p. aequatorialis (Sundevall, CJ, 1869) – Pearl Islands and adjacent mainland Panama
- S. p. jubaris (Olson, SL, 1980) – southeastern Panama to west-central Colombia
- S. p. peruviana (Sundevall, CJ, 1869) – far southwestern Colombia (Nariño) to western Ecuador and northern Peru (Lima)
- S. p. aureola (Gould, J, 1839) – Cocos Islands (off Costa Rica) and the Galápagos Islands
- S. p. ruficapilla (Gmelin, JF, 1789) – Martinique (Lesser Antilles)
- S. p. rufivertex (Ridgway, R, 1885) – Cozumel (off Quintana Roo)
- S. p. armouri (Greenway, JC, 1933) – Isla Providéncia (western Caribbean Sea)
- S. p. flavida (Cory, CB, 1887) – Isla San Andrés (western Caribbean Sea)
- S. p. eoa (Gosse, PH, 1847) – Jamaica and Cayman Islands
- S. p. gundlachi (Baird, SF, 1865) – lower Florida Keys, Cuba including Isla de la Juventud, and Bahamas
- S. p. flaviceps (Chapman, FM, 1892) – Bahamas
- S. p. albicollis (Gmelin, JF, 1789) – Hispaniola, including Gonâve and adjacent islands
- S. p. chlora (Browning, MR, 1994) – Seven Brothers Keys (off northern Hispaniola)
- S. p. solaris (Wetmore, A, 1929) – Gonâve Island (off western Hispaniola)
- S. p. bartholemica (Sundevall, CJ, 1869) – Puerto Rico, Virgin Islands, and the northern Lesser Antilles
- S. p. melanoptera (Lawrence, GN, 1879) – Guadeloupe (including satellite islands) and Dominica (central Lesser Antilles)
- S. p. babad (Bond, J, 1927) – Saint Lucia (Lesser Antilles)
- S. p. petechia (Linnaeus, C, 1766) – Barbados (Lesser Antilles)
- S. p. alsiosa (Peters, JL, 1926) – Grenadines (Lesser Antilles)
- S. p. rufopileata (Ridgway, R, 1884) – Arabu, Curaçao, Bonaire, and adjacent islands
- S. p. obscura (Cory, CB, 1909) – Islas Los Roques (off northern Venezuela)
- S. p. aurifrons (Phelps, WH Sr & Phelps, WH Jr, 1950) – coastal north-central Venezuela, Islas La Tortuga, Tortuguillas, and Piritu

== Description ==
The mangrove warbler is around 13 cm (5.1 in) in length. Apart from the rufous hood of the male, all subspecies are very similar. Females and immature birds have similarly greenish-yellow uppersides and are a duller yellow below. Young males soon acquire breast and, where appropriate, head coloration. Females are somewhat duller, most notably on the head. In all, the remiges and rectrices are blackish olive with yellow edges, sometimes appearing as an indistinct wing-band on the former. The eyes and the short thin beak are dark, while the feet are lighter or darker olive-buff.

== Status and conservation ==
The Barbados subspecies S. p. petechia has been listed as "endangered foreign wildlife" by the United States Endangered Species Act (ESA) since 1970; other than for specially permitted scientific, educational or conservation purposes, importing it into the US is illegal.

== Gallery ==
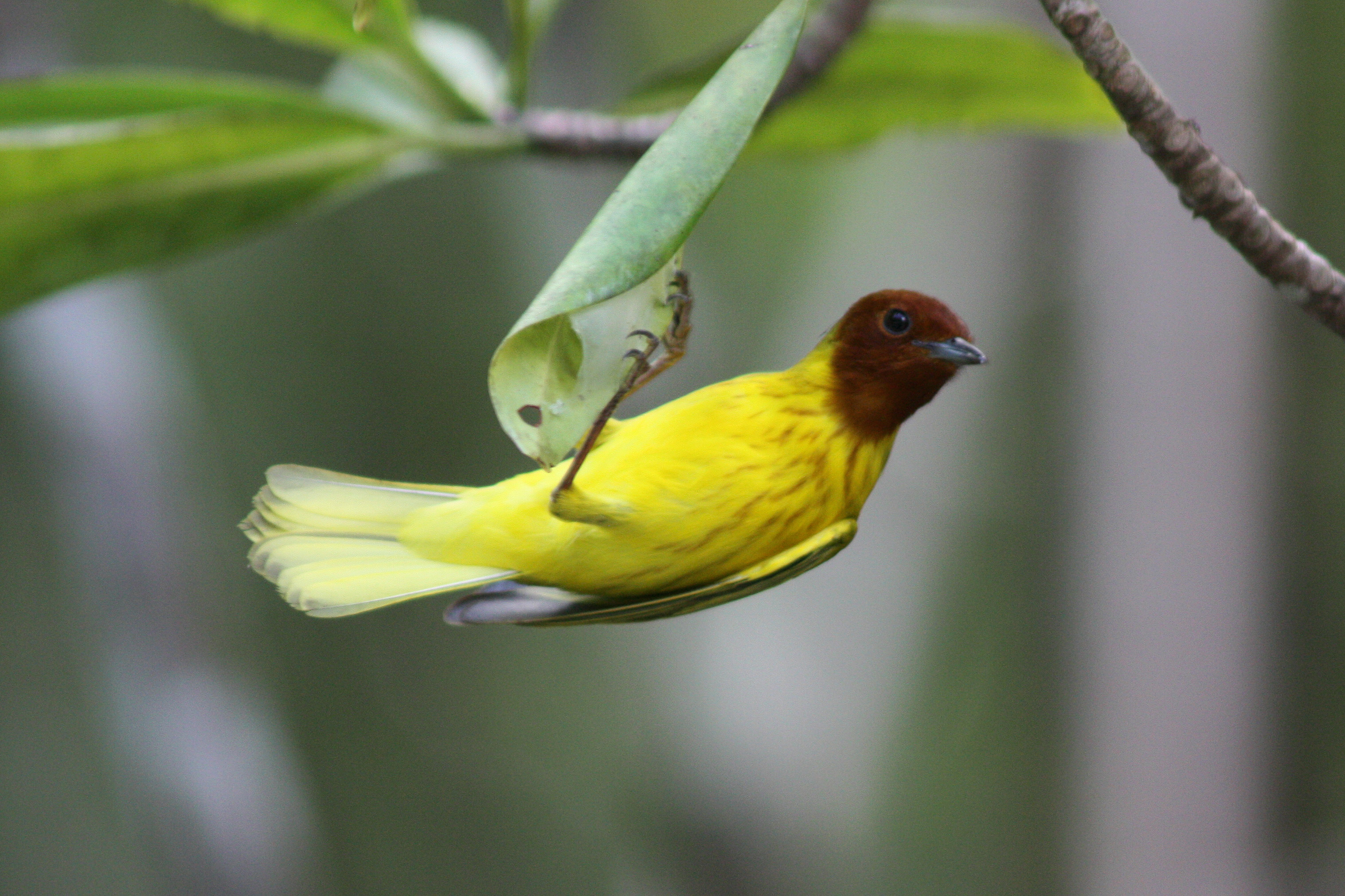
Male S. p. bryanti, Quepos, Costa Rica

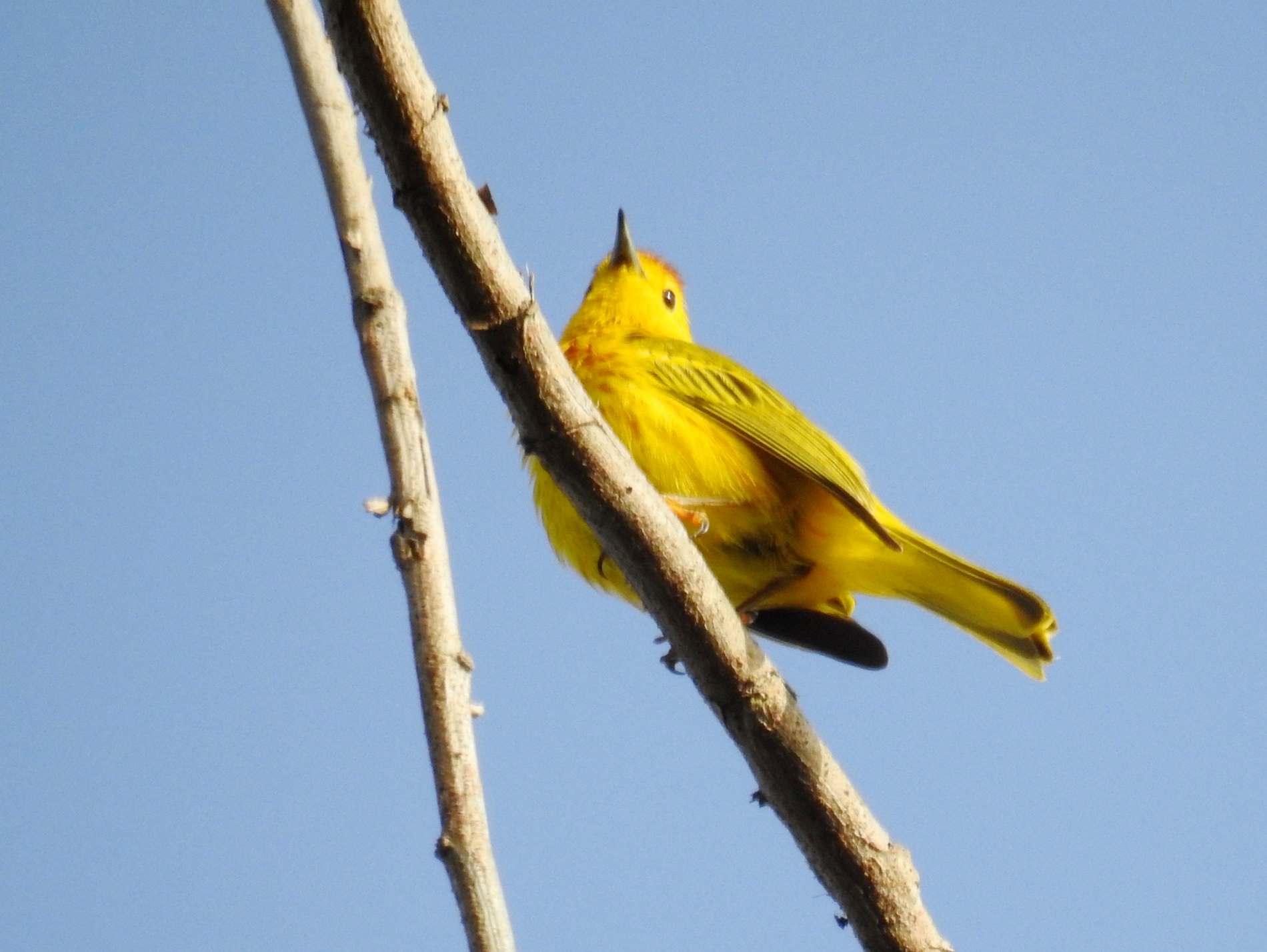
Male S. p. petechia, Barbados

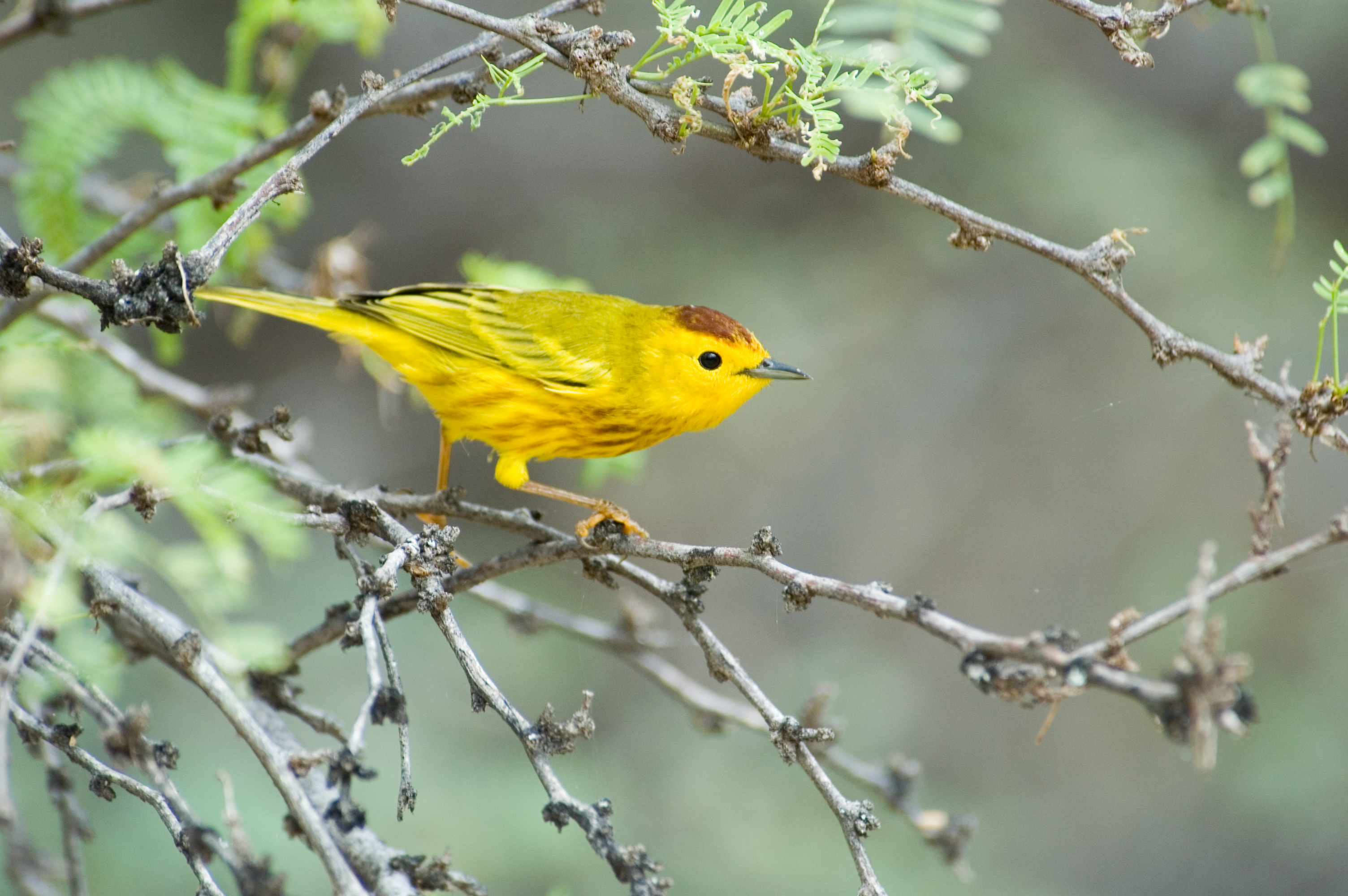
Male S. p. rufopileata, Washington-Slagbaai National Park, Bonaire, Netherlands Antilles

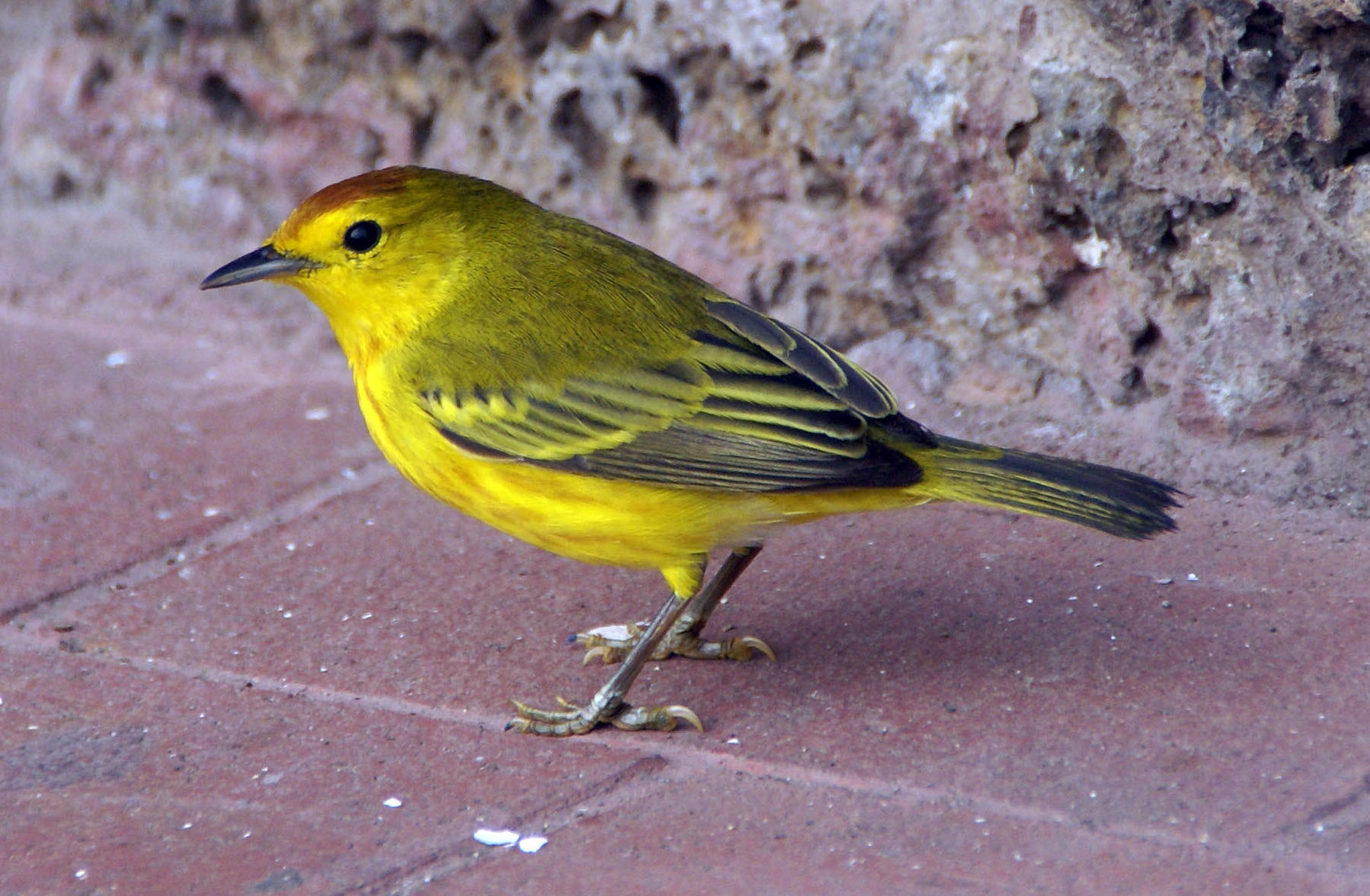
Male S. p. aureola, Puerto Ayora, Santa Cruz, Galápagos Islands

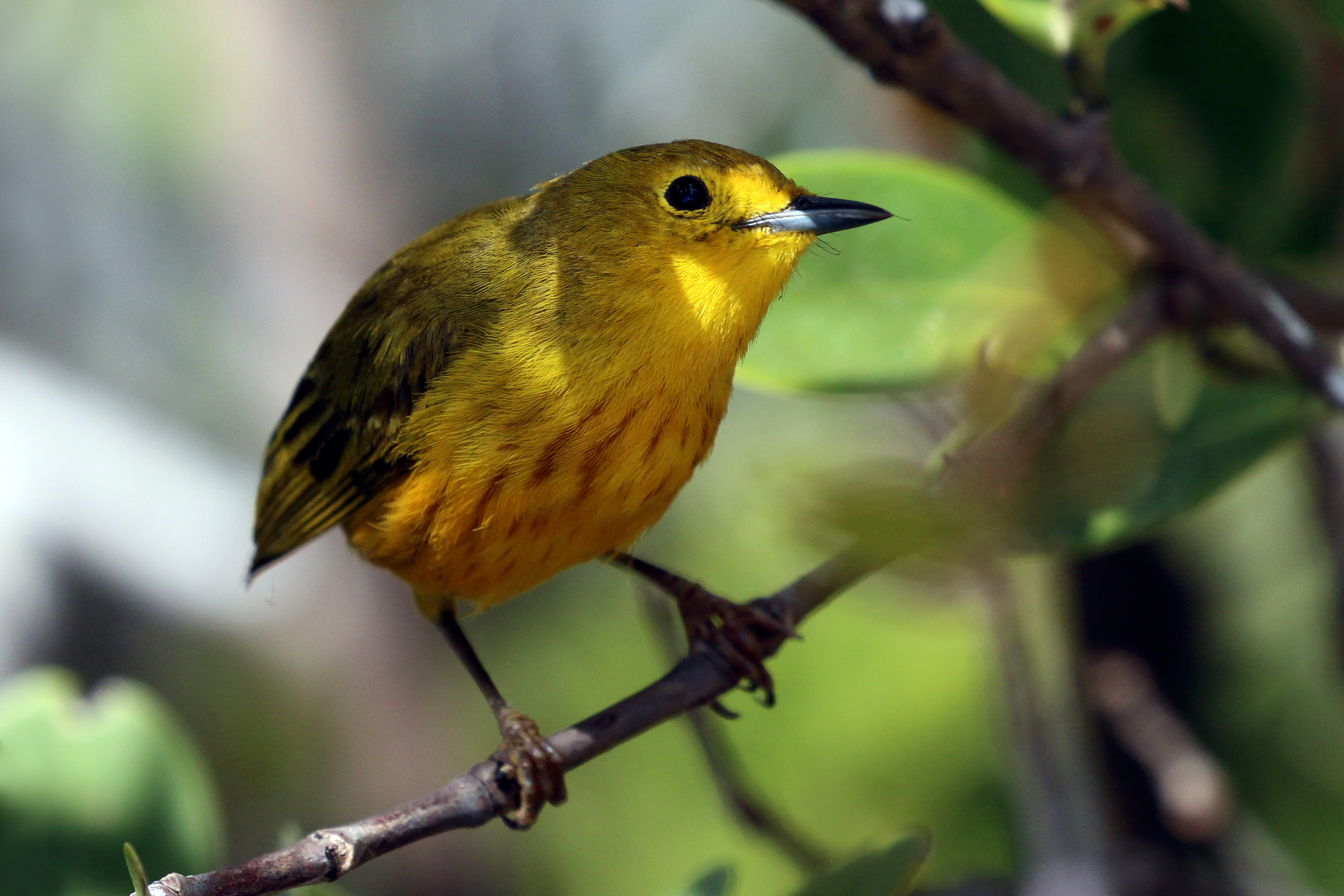
Male S. p. gundlachi, Cuba
