= Coxinha =

Brazilian snack

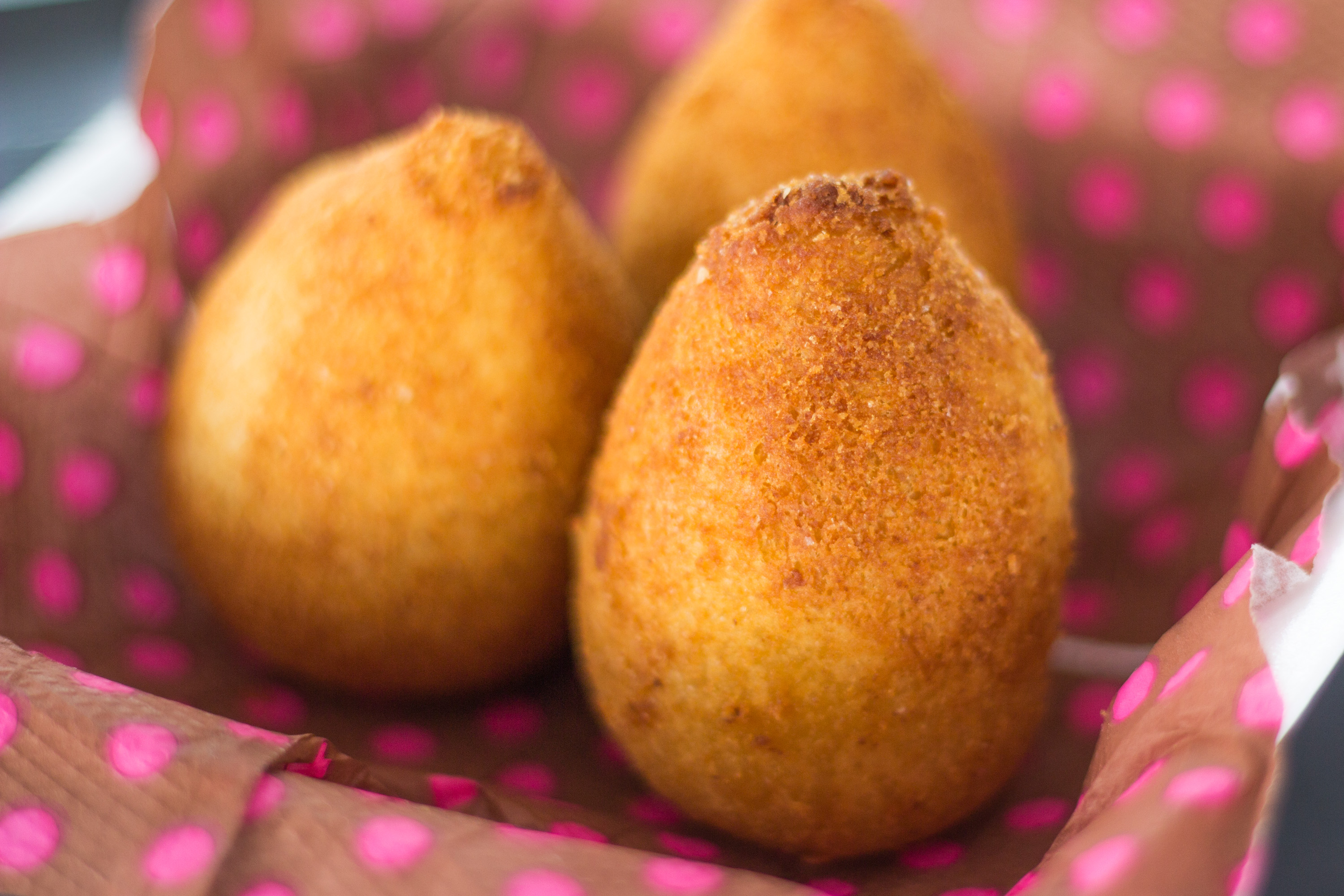
- Coxinha
- Type: Snack
- Place of origin: Brazil
- Region or state: São Paulo
- Serving temperature: Hot
- Main ingredients: Chicken, broth, flour, sometimes potatoes, and requeijão

Coxinha (/koʊˈʃiːnjə/ koh-SHEEN-yə; Portuguese: [koˈʃĩɲɐ], little [chicken] thigh) is a Brazilian snack of Paulista origin which consists of chopped or shredded chicken meat, covered in dough, molded into a shape resembling a teardrop, battered and fried.

== History ==
Coxinhas were originally made with any part of the chicken, and its traditional shape is meant to resemble a drumstick. In its modern processed form, it may have originated in Limeira, São Paulo, in the 19th century.

In the book Stories & Recipes, Nadir Cavazin says that the son of Isabel, Princess Imperial of Brazil (1846–1921) and Prince Gaston, Count of Eu, a child who lived in seclusion for having mental problems, had a favorite dish, chicken, but only ate the drumstick. One day, not having enough drumsticks, the cook decided to turn a whole chicken into drumsticks, nop for a flour dough shaped into a drumstick. The child endorsed the results. Empress Teresa Cristina, when she was visiting him, could not resist the tasty delicacy; she liked it so much that she requested that the master of the imperial kitchen learn how to prepare the snack.

== Preparation ==
The coxinha is based on dough made with wheat flour and chicken broth and optionally mashed potato, which is filled with shredded spiced chicken meat or a whole chicken drumstick. The filling consists of chicken, catupiry cheese or requeijão and onions, parsley and scallions, and occasionally tomato sauce, turmeric. The coxinha is coated in batter, then in bread crumbs or manioc flour and deep fried. It is shaped to roughly resemble a chicken drumstick. The dough used to coat the filling is generally prepared with the broth of the chicken, enhancing the flavor of the coating.

=== Variations ===
Different variations of the original are becoming more prevalent today – for example, the coxinha mineira, for which the filling includes maize, so named because maize is deemed a culinary tradition in the state of Minas Gerais, as well as areas where the caipira and sertanejo dialects are spoken. Cheese coxinhas are also very common in snack bars. In Curitiba, chicken coxinhas filled with cheddar and Araucaria nuts can be found in local restaurants. To mark the cheese, they usually have a toothpick where the bone would be in a chicken coxinha.

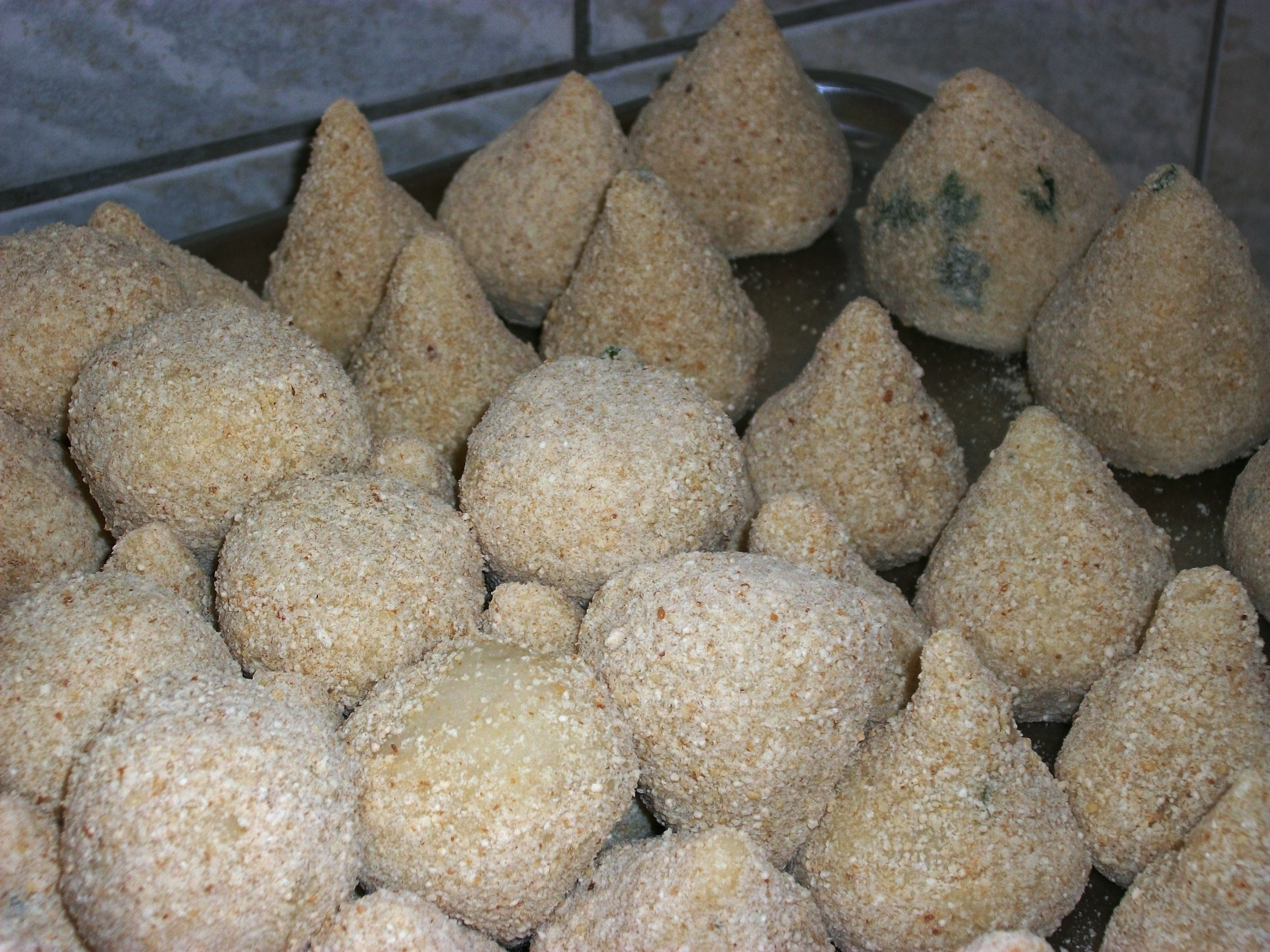
Coxinhas before frying. Note pieces of parsley as part of the seasoning of the thick batter.

Other unconventional ingredients, generally used for home-made coxinhas made by aficionados, include peas, chopped button mushrooms, heart of palm, carrot, cooked and seasoned cashew apples, unripe jackfruit or unripe breadfruit, as well as whole-wheat flour batter or even a vegetarian version of either textured vegetable protein (soy meat) or falafel with appropriate seasonings so its taste resembles a traditional coxinha more closely. These variants are rarely found in snack bars.

== Related foods ==
Coxinha literally means "little thigh", and it is how deep-fried chicken legs are informally named in Brazil (coxa frita means a deep-fried chicken leg, while sobrecoxa frita stands for a deep-fried upper drumstick; it is not uncommon for people having a strong preference for certain poultry cuts over others). Battered and deep-fried chicken breast pieces, for example, are generally called by the name of English influence, nugget.

One of the traditional snacks from the city of Lapa is coxinha de farofa, produced with chicken farofa and pastel dough, with a shape similar to a straw.

- Croquette
- Arancini
- Cuisine of Brazil
- List of Brazilian dishes
- Chicken nugget
