= Paçoca de amendoim =

Brazilian peanut sweet, typical of the state of São Paulo

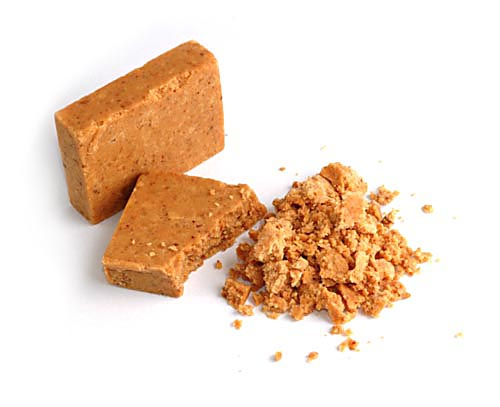
- Place of origin: Brazil
- Region or state: São Paulo
- Main ingredients: Ground peanuts, sugar

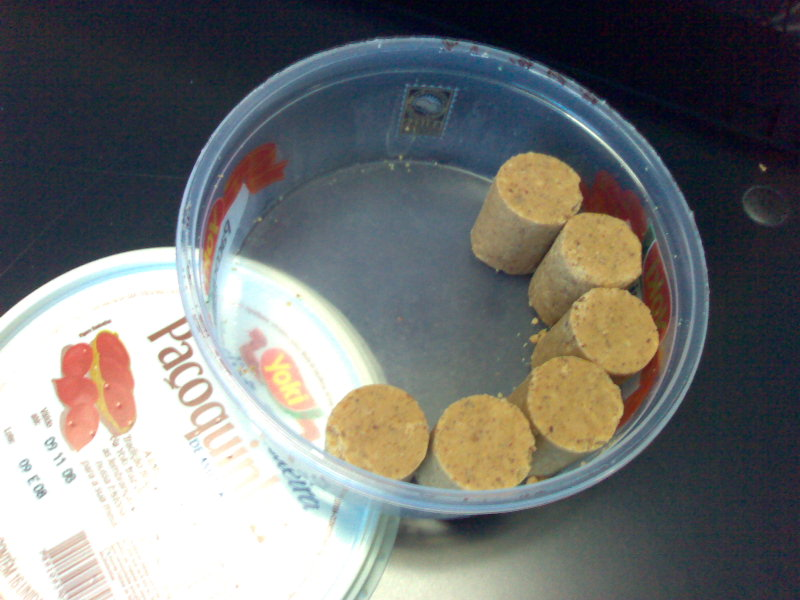
Cork shaped paçocas

Paçoca de amendoim (/pəˈsɒkə/ pə-SO-kə; Portuguese: [paˈsɔka]) is a Brazilian candy typical from São Paulo cuisine, originating in the interior of São Paulo. It is made out of ground peanuts, sugar, and salt. Some recipes also add flour, such as corn flour, oat flour or cassava flour. Typical of the São Paulo Caipira cuisine, it is also present in other states of the country (specially in regions of the historical Paulistania such as Minas Gerais and Paraná (state)), being either manufactured or home-made. Paçoca is also very common during the Festa Junina, an annual festivity that celebrates the caipira lifestyle in Brazil, in addition to being a tradition during Lent and religious festivals in the cities of the Paraíba Valley, such as the artisanal paçoca from Paraibuna. It is known for its distinct dry texture and sweet taste, and is one of the most beloved Brazilian candies.

The state of São Paulo is the largest producer of peanuts in Brazil, while the Santa Helena Group, created in 1942 in the city of Ribeirão Preto, is responsible for the production of Paçoquita, the most consumed paçoca in the country. It is made in a cork or rectangular shape. The group has also launched, in recent years, the creamy version and other versions, such as Paçoquita Diet.

== Origins ==
Savory paçoca was invented earlier during the period of Colonial Brazil Period, and the Native Brazilian peoples had recipes that mixed cassava flour with other ingredients such as meat. Thus, at that time and in subsequent periods, savory paçoca was considered a meal. With the arrival of the Portuguese and the beginning of the exploration of lands, such as Entradas and Bandeiras, who departed from the captaincy of São Paulo, capturing Indigenous people to work in gold mines and labor, paçoca became popular as a viable and nutritious alternative for prospectors, who took almost a month to reach the banks of the Tibagi River in Paraná.

Over time, these recipes were modified by people from the interior of São Paulo, who combined them with peanuts, sugar, and salt, giving rise to peanut paçoca, which, until the 1980s, was called peanut candy.

== Etymology ==
The word "paçoca" comes from the Tupi word pa'soka which means crumble. The term is also used for the savoury dish by the same name. Both are a mix of cassava flour pounded together with other ingredients – peanuts and sugar in the case of the sweet, and carne-de-sol (sun-dried-beef) for the savoury dish.

== Production ==
The traditional artisanal process of making paçoca involves first roasting the peanuts, then grinding all the ingredients together using a traditional mortar (pilão). In more modern manufacturing techniques, instead of a mortar, industrial blenders are used, and the Paçocas are later pressed into many shapes, most commonly square or cork shapes.

== Variations ==
Some companies have created variations from the traditional Paçoca recipe, which include a diet version, with no sugar added, and a version with a concentration of peanuts.

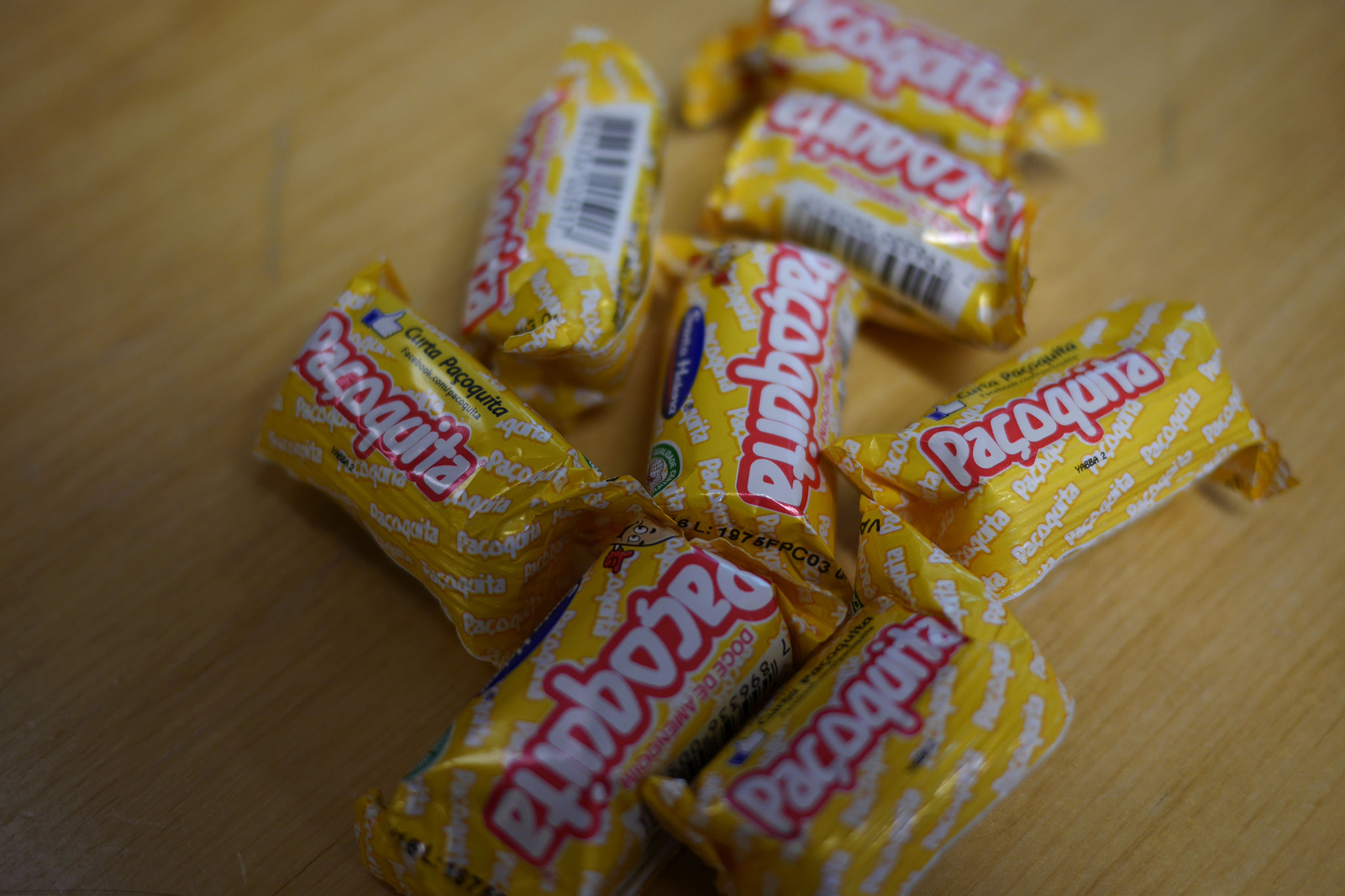
"Paçoquita", a popular version of industrialized paçoca

== See also ==
- List of Brazilian sweets and desserts
