= Queijo de colônia =

Brazilian cheese

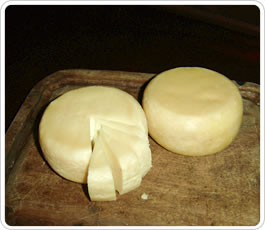
Colony cheese

Colony cheese (Portuguese: queijo de colônia, pronounced [ˈkejʒu dʒi koˈlõnjɐ]) is a type of cheese produced in the highlands of the Brazilian state of Rio Grande do Sul. It is considered one of the icons of southern Brazilian cuisine and is also produced in Santa Catarina. The name derives from the colônias ("colonies"), land allotments settled by German and Italian immigrants, where the cheese originated.

== Production ==
This cheese is made by artisan production, usually in rural areas of the highlands, especially in regions settled by German and Italian immigrants who starting almost two hundred years ago brought with them their cheese-making traditions. It has low production cost, due to its simple manufacturing process, consisting mainly of milk, salt and milk enzymes. It typically goes through a maturation process that can take several months. The aging gives the cheese its most striking feature: a soft, slightly spicy inside, complex flavor and surrounded by a solid yellow crust. The older the cheese gets, bigger and harder its crust get, making the taste of this product more pungent and striking.

There can be a formation of small white mold in its external part, but that does not affect the quality of the product. This problem can be solved by storing it in environments of low relative humidity. Usually this cheese is consumed accompanied by red wines, or it can also be used for cooking, especially in pizzas, lasagnas and other pastas.

== Features ==
Description: mildly spicy, lactic-tasting, close dough, pale yellow colour. Produced without the use of dyes or preservatives. Consistency: hard or semi-hard outside. Soft, fairly creamy inside, showing good elasticity. Easily sliced and well melted when subjected to heat.

Shape: cylindrical and flat, weighing from 800 g (28 oz) to 4 kg (8.8 lb).

== See also ==
- German-Brazilian
- List of Brazilian dishes
- Riograndenser Hunsrückisch
- List of cheeses
