= Coxinha de farofa =

Brazilian snack

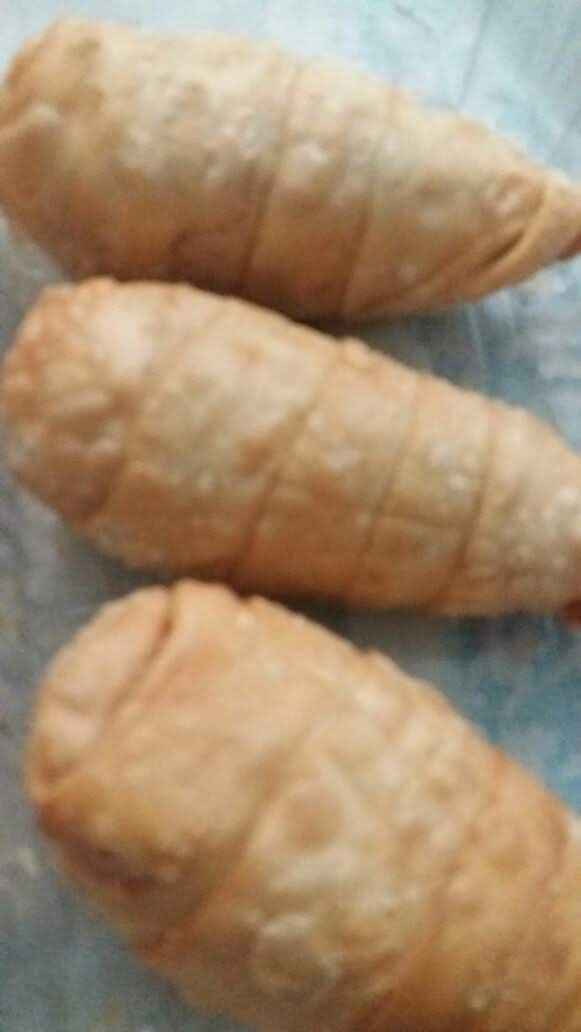
- Coxinha de farofa
- Type: Snack
- Place of origin: Brazil
- Region or state: Paraná
- Created by: Maria da Glória Ribas Kuss
- Serving temperature: Hot
- Main ingredients: Chicken farofa and pastel dough

Coxinha de farofa or coxinha da Lapa is a traditional snack from Lapa. Despite being named after coxinha, it is made by covering chicken meat farofa with pastel dough and molded in a shape that resembles a straw.

== History ==
The creation of coxinha de farofa is attributed to Maria da Glória Ribas Kuss. She was selling pastel during the worship party of Benedict the Moor in Lapa during the 1940s to help funding the construction of a new church for the community. Eventually, most of the ingredients were over, but she improvised the snack by making chicken meat farofa and mixing it with pastel dough.

From there on, the snack became a tradition during the Saint Benedict parties. It was initially known as "coxinha da dona Glória", but she disapproved of the name. Dona Glória sold the snack exclusively during the festivities, and the original recipe was eventually lost. Rosa Mazur Kugeratski and her daughter Irene copied the recipe and started selling it on her bakery, Panificadora Zeni, thus helping to popularize the snack in the city.

Coxinha de farofa became important for Lapa's economy, as many tourists began coming to the city just to taste the snack. In March 2015, the Prefecture promoted the first Coxinha Party.

== Preparation ==
Coxinha de farofa differs from coxinha, being prepared with pastel dough and shaped as a straw. Traditionally, the snack is chicken meat farofa flavoured, but with time new fillings were used, including dried meat and sausage farofa.
