= Catupiry =

Brazilian cheese

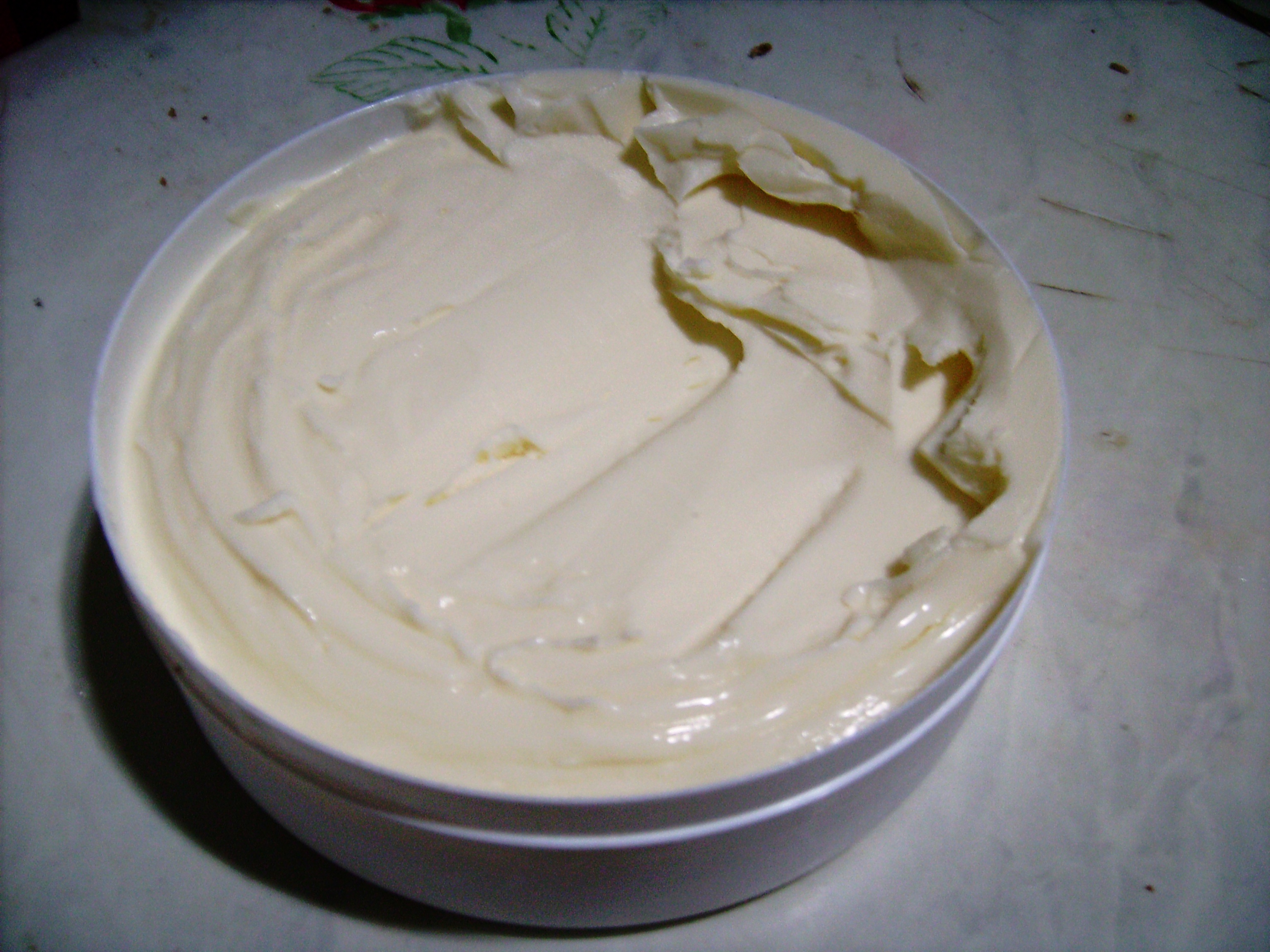
Catupiry

Catupiry (Portuguese pronunciation: [katupiˈɾi]) is one of the most popular brands of requeijão (creamy dairy spread) in Brazil. It was developed by Italian immigrant Mario Silvestrini in the state of Minas Gerais in 1911. The name derives from the Tupi word meaning "excellent".

Catupiry is a soft, mild-tasting "cheese" that can be spread over toasts, crackers and bread buns or used in cooking. Because of its low level of acidity, Catupiry has become an ingredient in various dishes.

Catupiry, as well as imitation cheeses, is a very common ingredient in Brazilian dishes, specially as a filling for pizzas, coxinhas, pães de queijo or pastéis.

Currently, Catupiry has four factories, two in São Paulo in the municipalities of Bebedouro and Santa Fé do Sul and the others in Doverlândia, in Goiás, and Santa Vitória, in Minas Gerais. The company is currently managed by six families, all heirs of the Silvestrini family. The company has a turnover of around R$ 600 million per year and is present in five countries, including the United States, Canada and Japan.

== See also ==
- List of Brazilian dishes
