= Pastéis in Brazilian political campaigns =

Political campaign practice in Brazil

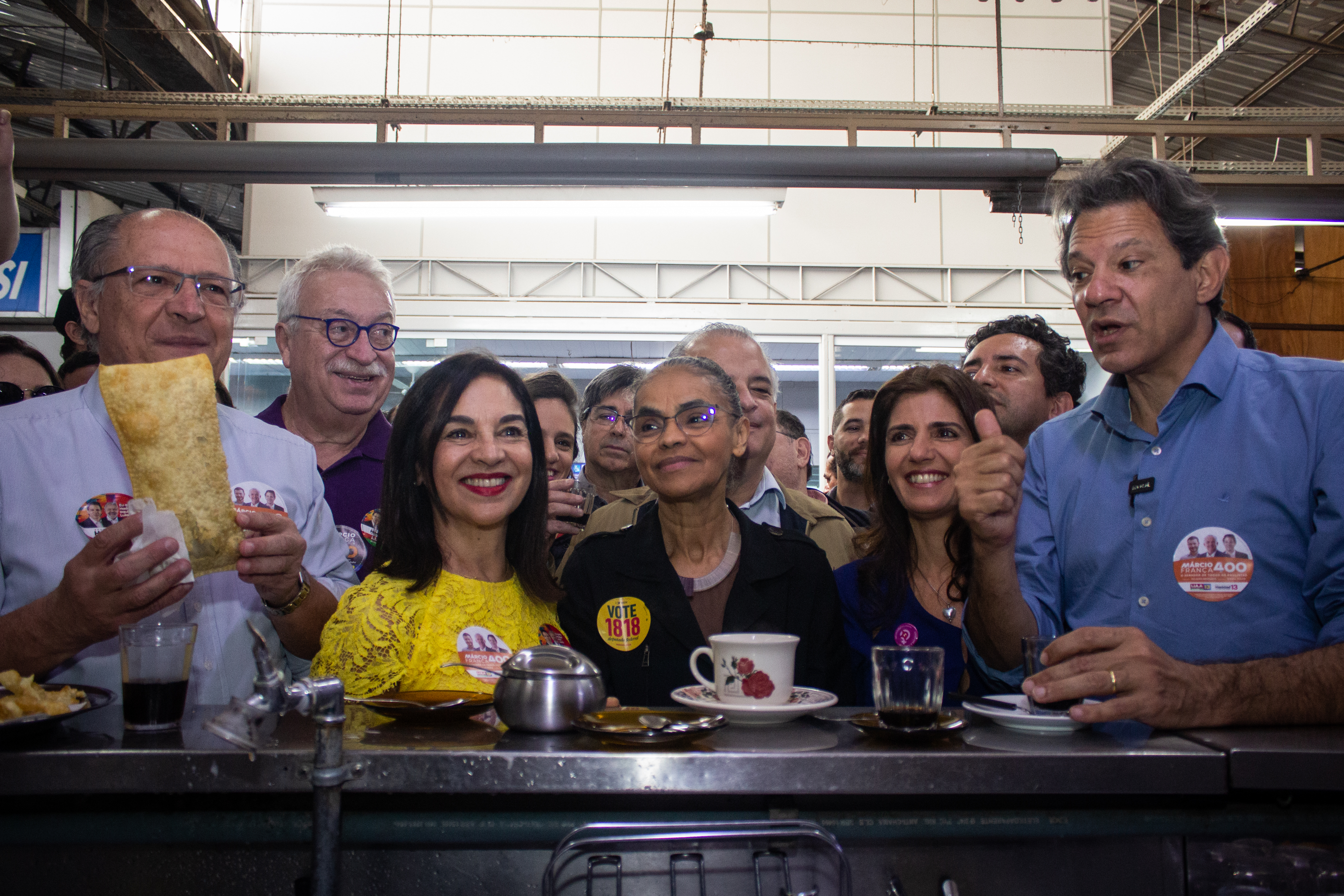
Fernando Haddad (right), then a candidate for governor of São Paulo, in a pastel shop, alongside other politicians.

During election campaigns in Brazil, the act of eating street market pastéis is often used by politicians as a way to get closer to the public. This gesture gains significant attention and becomes the subject of internet memes, leading people to nickname the election campaign period in Brazil as "pastel season."

== Motivation ==
There is also the idea that candidates undergo through this custom simply to show themselves in an urban context. For political scientist Ricken, although some politicians may use the act as a form of opportunism, others use as campaign strategy."

== Reception ==
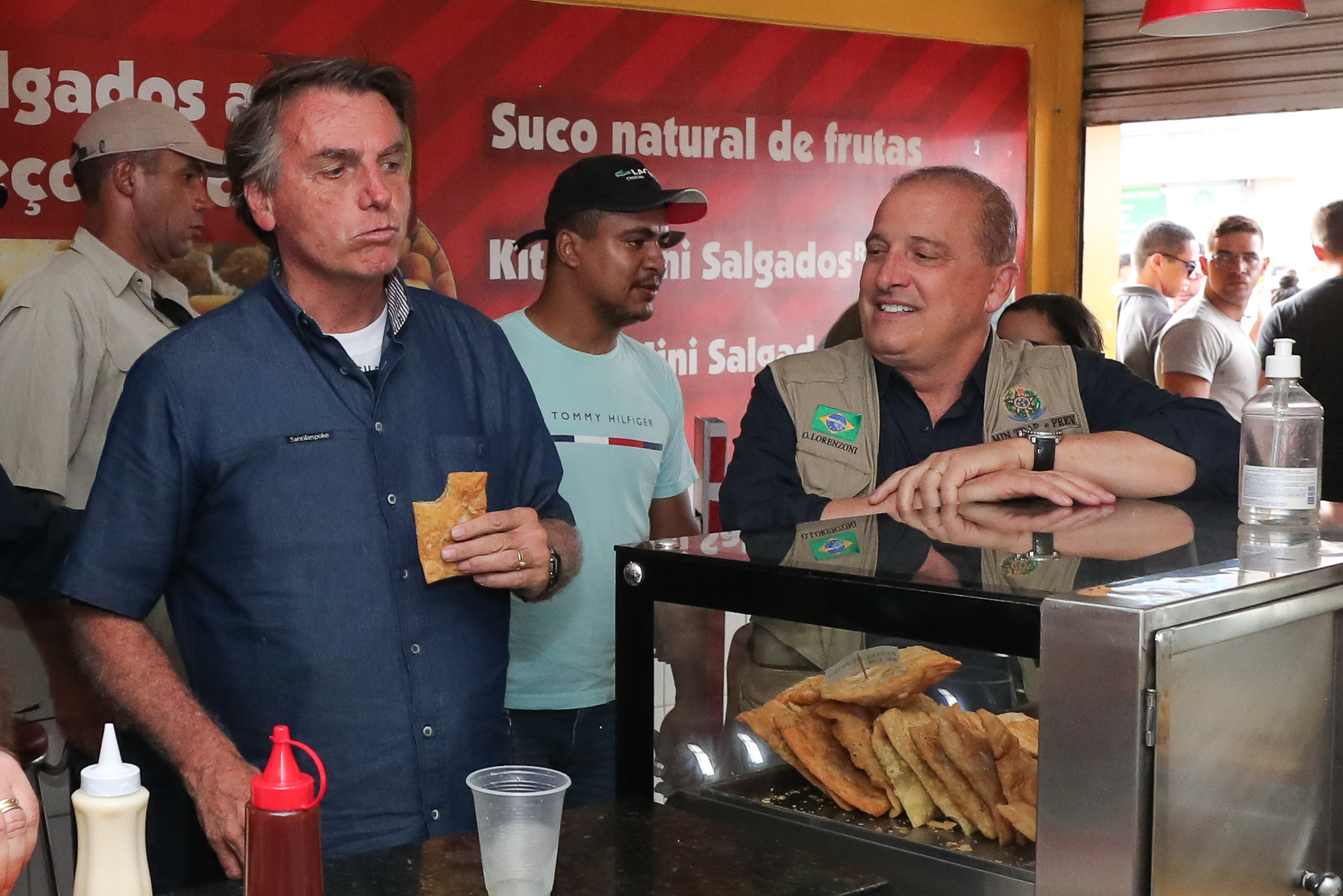
Jair Bolsonaro (left), then president of Brazil, at a pastel shop in Toritama, Pernambuco, in 2021

Seen by some as a cliché, this act gains traction on the internet and becomes the target of memes. The election period is satirized on social media, where it is nicknamed "pastel season." Politicians from center or right-wing parties were derided online by left-leaning internet users when carried out that act, due to their perceived lack of history of connection with social movements.

=== Notable incidents ===
In 2016, João Doria, a candidate for mayor of São Paulo, was photographed making a face interpreted as either a grimace or an expression of disgust while eating a pastel and drinking coffee. Following the backlash, which involved internet memes, his press team asked that he not be photographed while eating. After being elected, Doria said he had "learned how to eat a pastel." Two years later, he posted an image on his Twitter account showing him smiling while eating a pastry, saying it was the "best moment of the day".

In August 2022, the pastel shop Gran Pastel Gourmet started selling pastéis named after the four main presidential candidates — Jair Bolsonaro, Luiz Inácio Lula da Silva, Ciro Gomes, and Simone Tebet — each with some characteristic related to the respective politician. At the end of the month, however, the delivery platform iFood vetoed the sale of some of the pastéis, blocking three of them, except for Bolsonaro's.

Rosângela Moro, a candidate for federal deputy for São Paulo in 2022, posted a video on social media in September of herself eating a pastel. However, in the background, a woman could be seen rummaging through the trash of the pastel stall. After the backlash, she apologized and deleted the video. Political scientist Francis Ricken classified Rosângela's attitude as opportunistic: "The meme arises when the gap between the politician's image and what they do is very wide. A politician who hasn't frequented that environment and tries to get close comes across as strange [...] She is much more connected to Curitiba than to São Paulo, but she tries it in São Paulo to reach a larger electorate and become a prominent party figure. That is opportunism."
