= Paçoca =

Brazilian dish

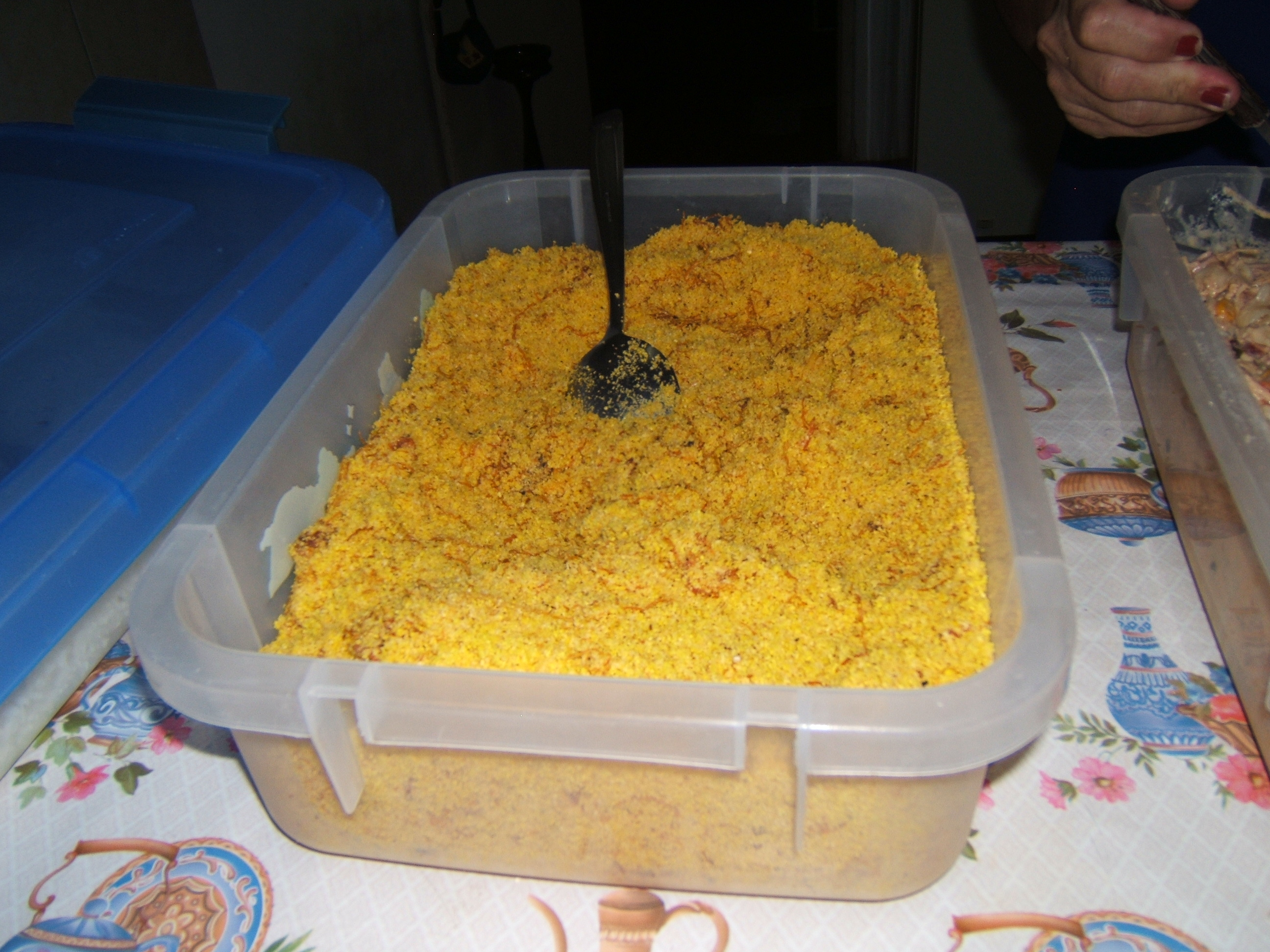
Savory paçoca

Paçoca, or meat paçoca or savory paçoca, is a typical Brazilian dish. Of indigenous origin, it is made with cassava flour and dried meat.

== Etymology ==
The word "paçoca" comes from the Tupi word pa'soka which means crumble.The term is used for a candy and also by a savoury dish. Both are a mix of cassava flour pounded together with other ingredients – peanuts and sugar in the case of the sweet, and carne-de-sol (sun-dried-beef) for the savoury dish.

== Origins ==
Savory paçoca was invented during the period of Colonial Brazil Period, and the Native Brazilian peoples had recipes that mixed cassava flour with other ingredients such as dried meat. Thus, at that time and in subsequent periods, savory paçoca was considered a meal that did not spoil during long periods of travel. With the arrival of the Portuguese and the beginning of the exploration of lands, such as Entradas and Bandeiras, who departed from the captaincy of São Paulo, capturing Indigenous people to work in gold mines and labor, paçoca became popular as a viable and nutritious alternative for prospectors, who took almost a month to reach the banks of the Tibagi River in Paraná.

Over time, these recipes were modified by people from the interior of São Paulo, who combined them with peanuts, sugar, and salt, giving rise to peanut paçoca, which, until the 1980s, was called peanut candy.

== See also ==
- Paçoca de amendoim
