= Escondidinho =

Brazilian dish

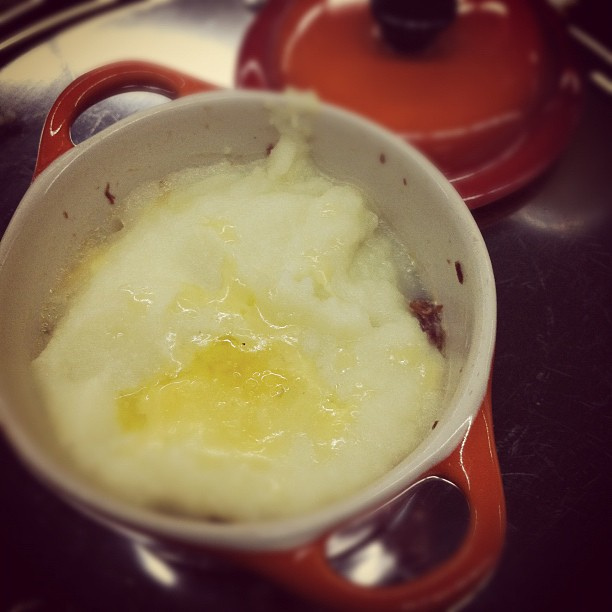
- Type: Meat pie
- Place of origin: Brazil

Escondidinho (from Portuguese: escondido, literally "hidden", plus a diminutive suffix) is a Northeastern Brazilian dish made with carne-de-sol or shredded chicken and topped with a layer of manioc purée. The dish often includes cheese and chicken; cod is sometimes used instead of beef.

The name describes the way the meat is covered ("hidden") with a purée.
