= Mocotó =

Brazilian dish made from cow's feet

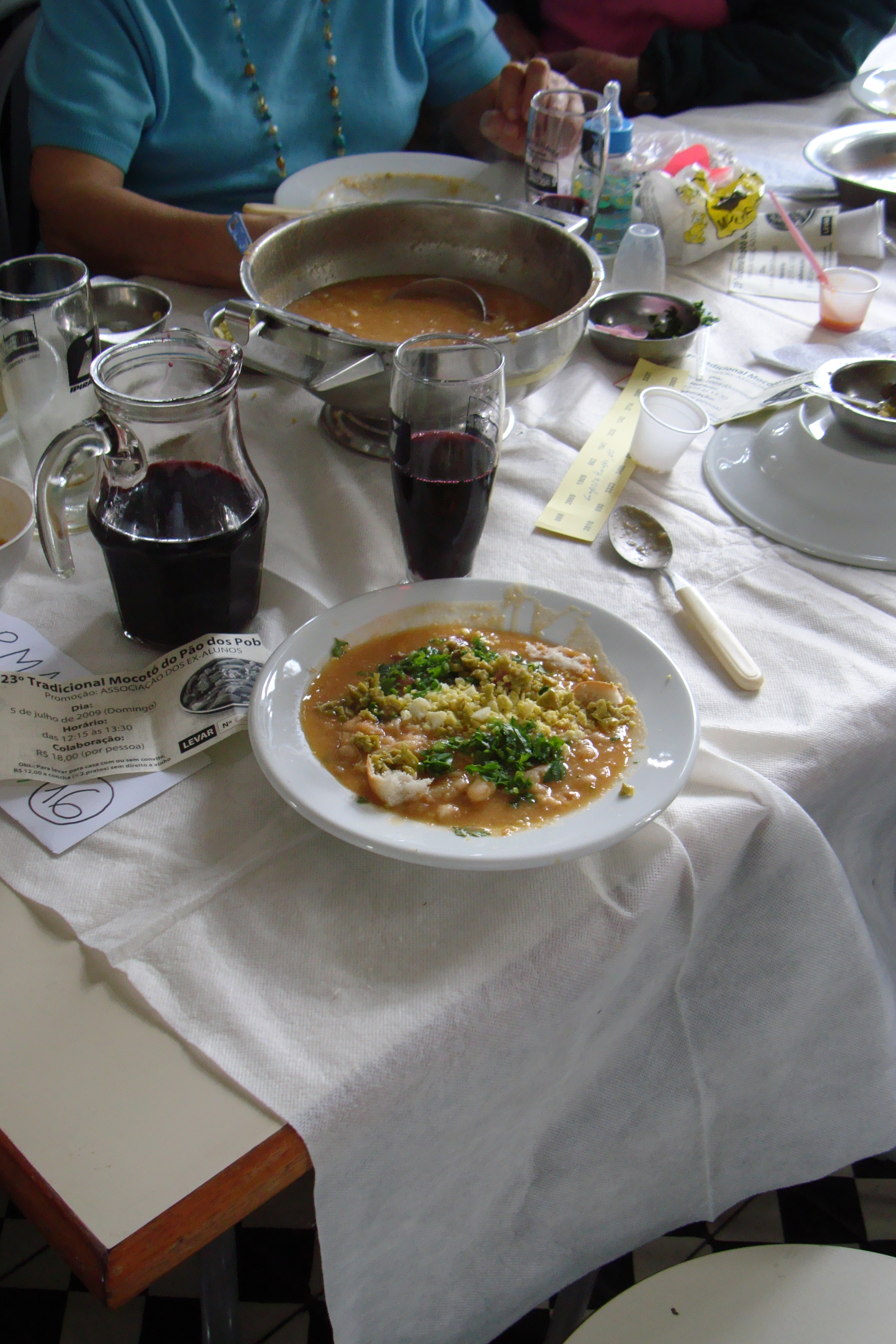
- Mocotó of Rio Grande do Sul
- Type: Stew
- Place of origin: Brazil
- Region or state: Brazil, Portugal
- Main ingredients: Cow's feet, beans, vegetables

Mocotó (Brazilian Portuguese: [moko'tɔ]) is a Brazilian dish made from cow's feet, stewed with beans and vegetables. The name is derived from the Kimbundu mbokotó.

This dish is also popular in Portuguese cuisine, where it is known as mão de vaca com grão. The only difference in the Portuguese variation is the inclusion of chickpeas.

Mocotó was originally made in Angola and picked up by the Portuguese during their colonization of the southwestern African country. Brazil later adopted the dish and incorporated their own taste by adding vegetables.

== Dishes derived ==
=== Mocotó gaúcho ===
In mocotó gaúcho or mocotó à moda gaúcha (known simply as mocotó among the gaúchos), dobradinha is added as a fundamental element of the dish, in addition to tripe and the curd.

== See also ==
- List of Brazilian dishes
- List of stews
