= Cabeça de galo =

Brazilian dish

Cabeça de galo is a dish from the cuisine of the northeast of Brazil, particularly the states of Pernambuco and Paraíba.

It consists of a broth of casava flour with eggs and spices (especially pepper) and may contain other ingredients such as tomatoes, coriander, garlic, peppers, and onions.
