= Tortuguilla Island =

Coordinates: 9.0306°N 76.3444°W

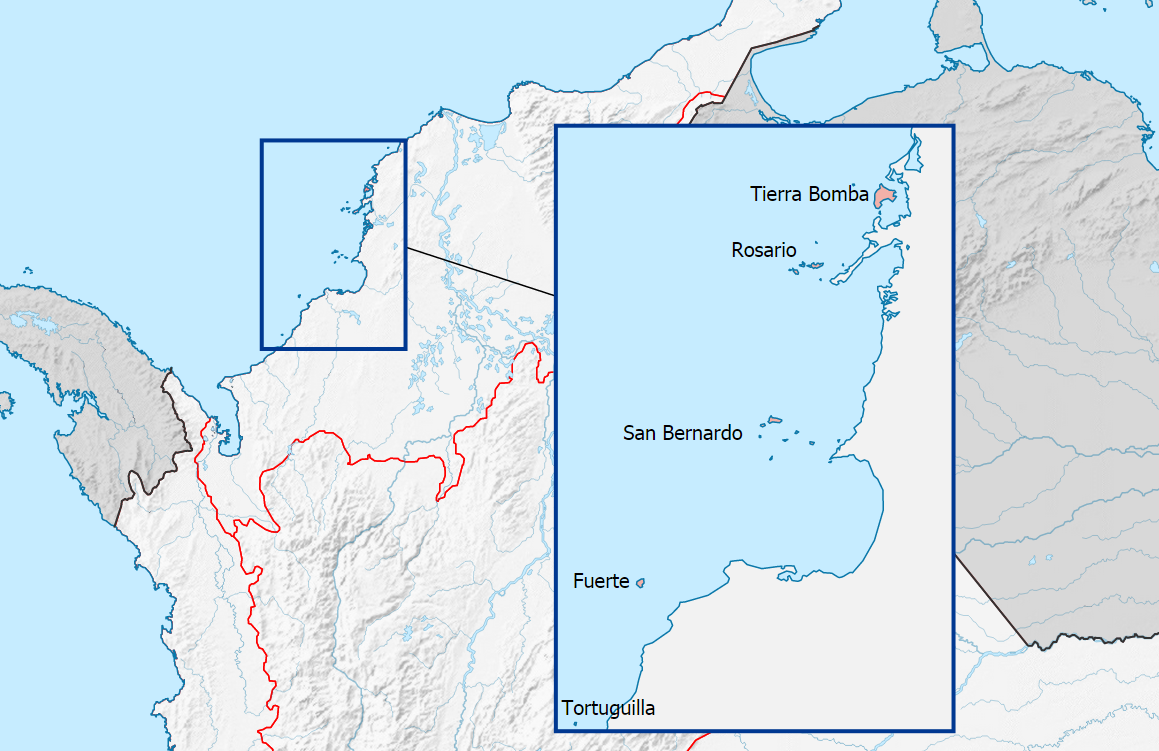
Location map of Tortuguilla Island

Tortuguilla Island (Isla Tortuguilla) is a small island in the Caribbean Sea off the northern coast of Colombia. It is located about 9 km from the mainland, at coordinates 09 ° 01'50 "N 76 ° 20'40" O. Administratively it belongs to the Córdoba department, in the municipality of Puerto Escondido.

== Geography ==
Tortuguilla is a landmass subfossil coral terrace surrounded by a limestone platform about 10 feet deep that is home to numerous coral reefs.

== See also ==
- Caribbean region of Colombia
- Insular region of Colombia
- List of islands of South America
