= Tareco =

Brazilian cookie

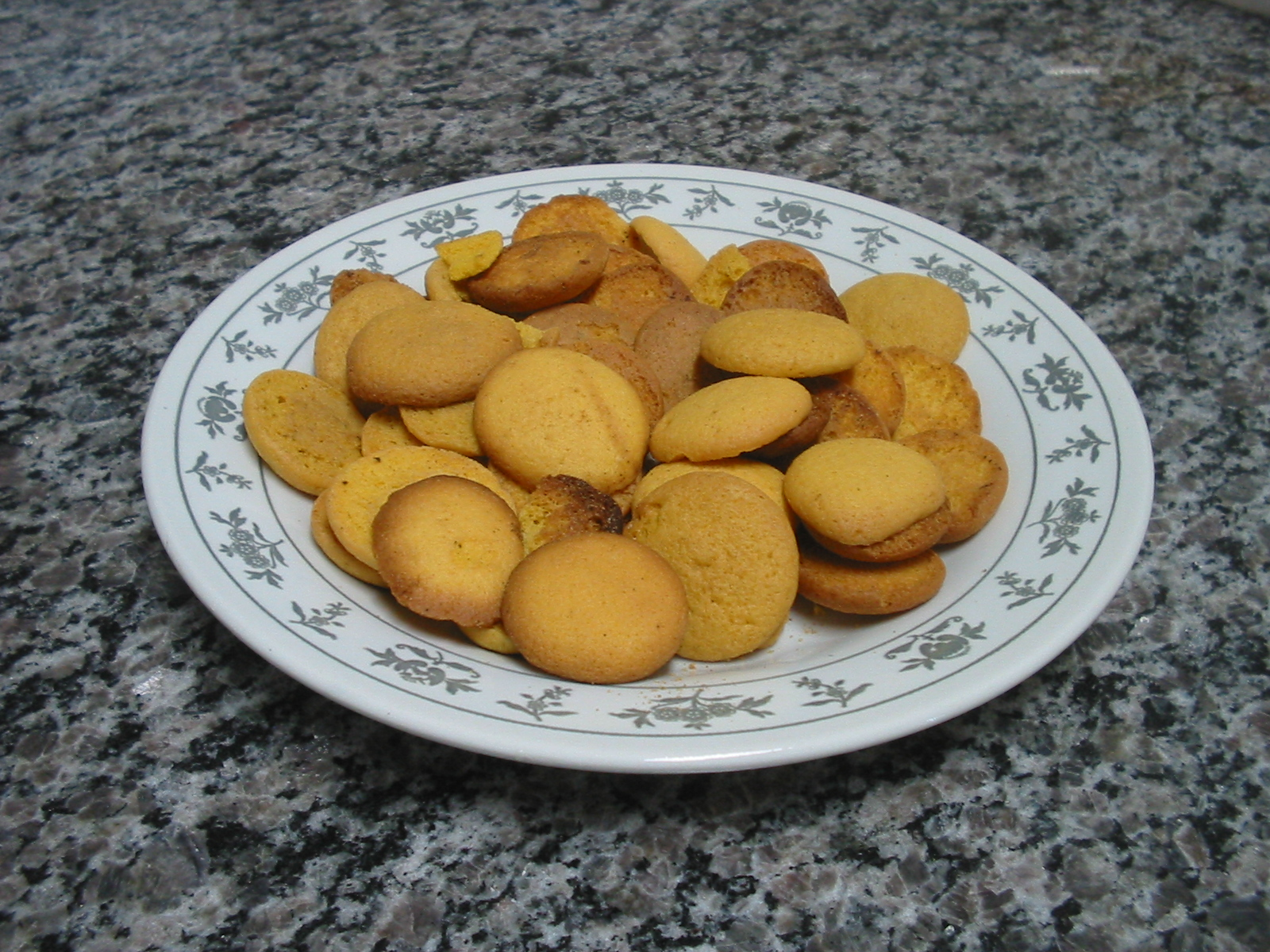
- Plate with tarecos
- Type: Biscuit
- Place of origin: Brazil
- Region or state: Pernambuco, Northeast Region
- Main ingredients: Wheat flour, eggs and sugar

The tareco (Brazilian Portuguese: [ta'ɾɛku]) is a little tough biscuit, made of wheat flour, eggs and sugar; that, when put into the oven, gets the disk shape.

It is part of the popular culture from the Northeast region of Brazil from far. It is said that the tareco was first made in the state of Pernambuco, and then introduced to all Brazil's Northeast. Its presence is noticed in poetry and lyrics; such as the famous song "Tareco e Mariola" (Tareco and Mariola), by Flávio José.
