= Arabu =

Indigenous Brazilian egg dish

- Alternative names: Mujangué or mujanguê
- Region or state: Acre
- Associated cuisine: Brazilian cuisine
- Main ingredients: Eggs, manioc flour, sugar

Arabu, also known as Mujangué, is an indigenous Brazilian dish from Acre consisting of raw eggs beaten with sugar and manioc flour. Traditionally, eggs from the yellow-spotted river turtle were used but eggs from the Brazilian free-range chicken are used nowadays due to environmental reasons.
