= Pastel (Brazilian food) =

Brazilian snack food

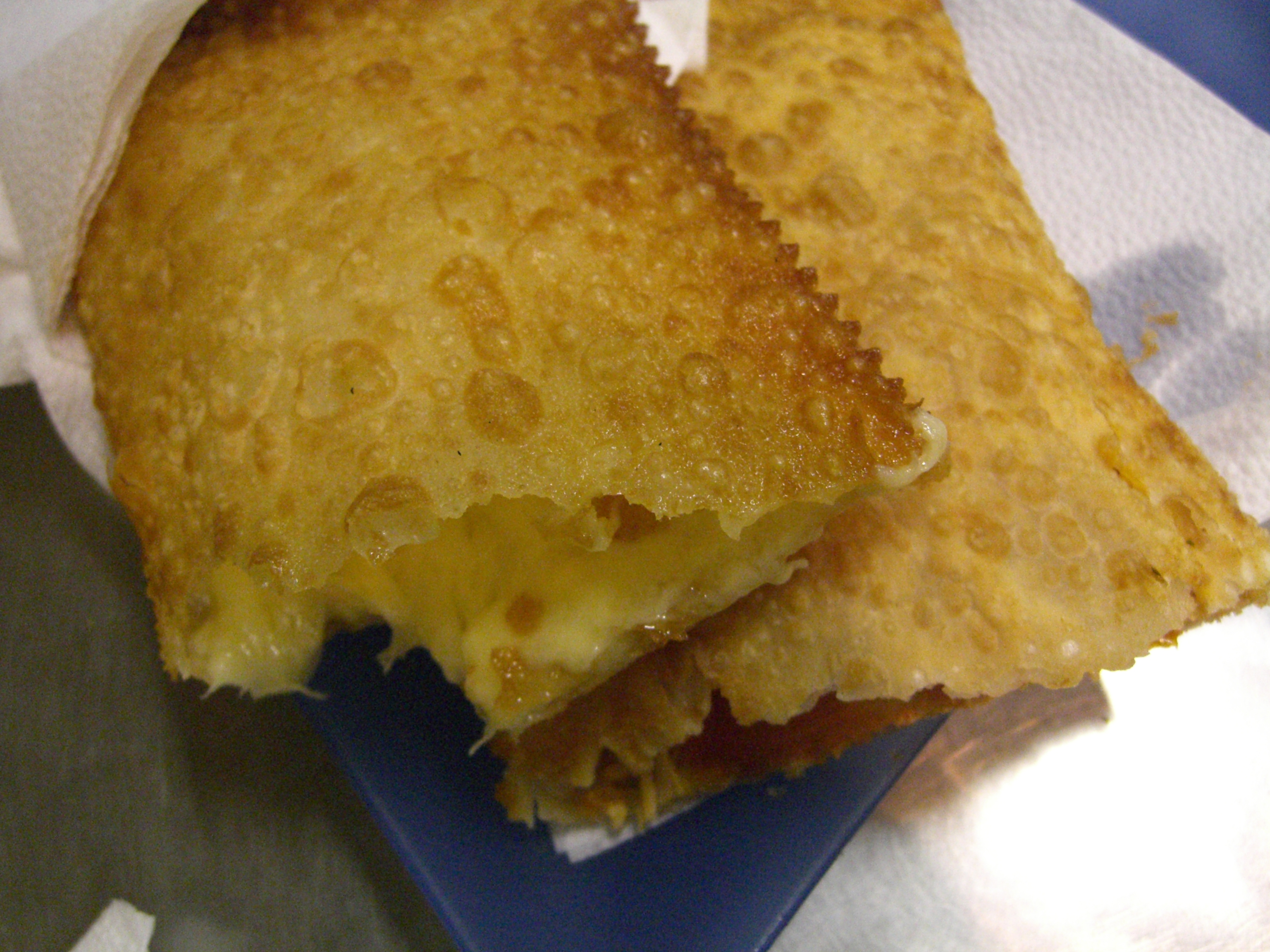
- Cheese pastel made in São Paulo
- Alternative names: Pastel de feira
- Type: Savoury snack, Turnover
- Place of origin: Brazil
- Region or state: São Paulo
- Invented: 1940s

A pastel (pl. pastéis), also known in Portuguese as pastel paulista (plural: pastéis paulistas) or pastel de feira (plural: pastéis de feira), is a typical Brazilian fast-food dish, originating in the state of São Paulo, consisting of half-circle or rectangle-shaped thin crust turnover with assorted fillings, fried in vegetable oil. The result is a crispy, brownish fried pie. The most common fillings are ground meat, mozzarella, Catupiry, heart of palm, codfish, cream cheese, chicken and small shrimp. Pastéis with sweet fillings such as guava paste with Minas cheese, banana and chocolate also exist. The pastel is classified in Brazilian cuisine as a salgado (savoury snack). It is traditionally sold on the streets, in open-air marketplaces, or in fast-food shops known as pastelarias.

It is commonly said to have originated when Chinese immigrants adapted their traditional spring rolls to the Brazilian taste using local ingredients. When these immigrants arrived in Brazil through the Port of Santos, they remained in the city before going to the countryside.

The recipe was later introduced to even more Brazilians by Japanese immigrants who, during World War II tried to pretend to be Chinese to escape from the prejudice Japanese people faced because of the Japanese alliance during the war. Another theory was that Japanese immigrants adapted Chinese fried wontons to sell as snacks at weekly street markets. A common beverage to drink with pastéis is caldo de cana, sugarcane juice.

Pastel de feira is common in election campaigns in Brazil. The act of eating pastel is frequently used by politicians as a way to connect with the population. The action is the subject of internet repercussions and memes, which nickname the election campaign period in Brazil "pastel season".

== See also ==
- Pastel
- List of Brazilian dishes
