= Carne de sol =

Beef dish from northeastern Brazil

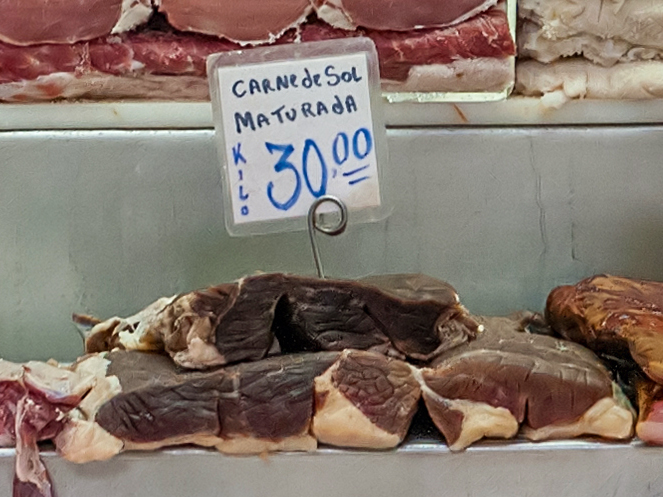
Matured carne de sol

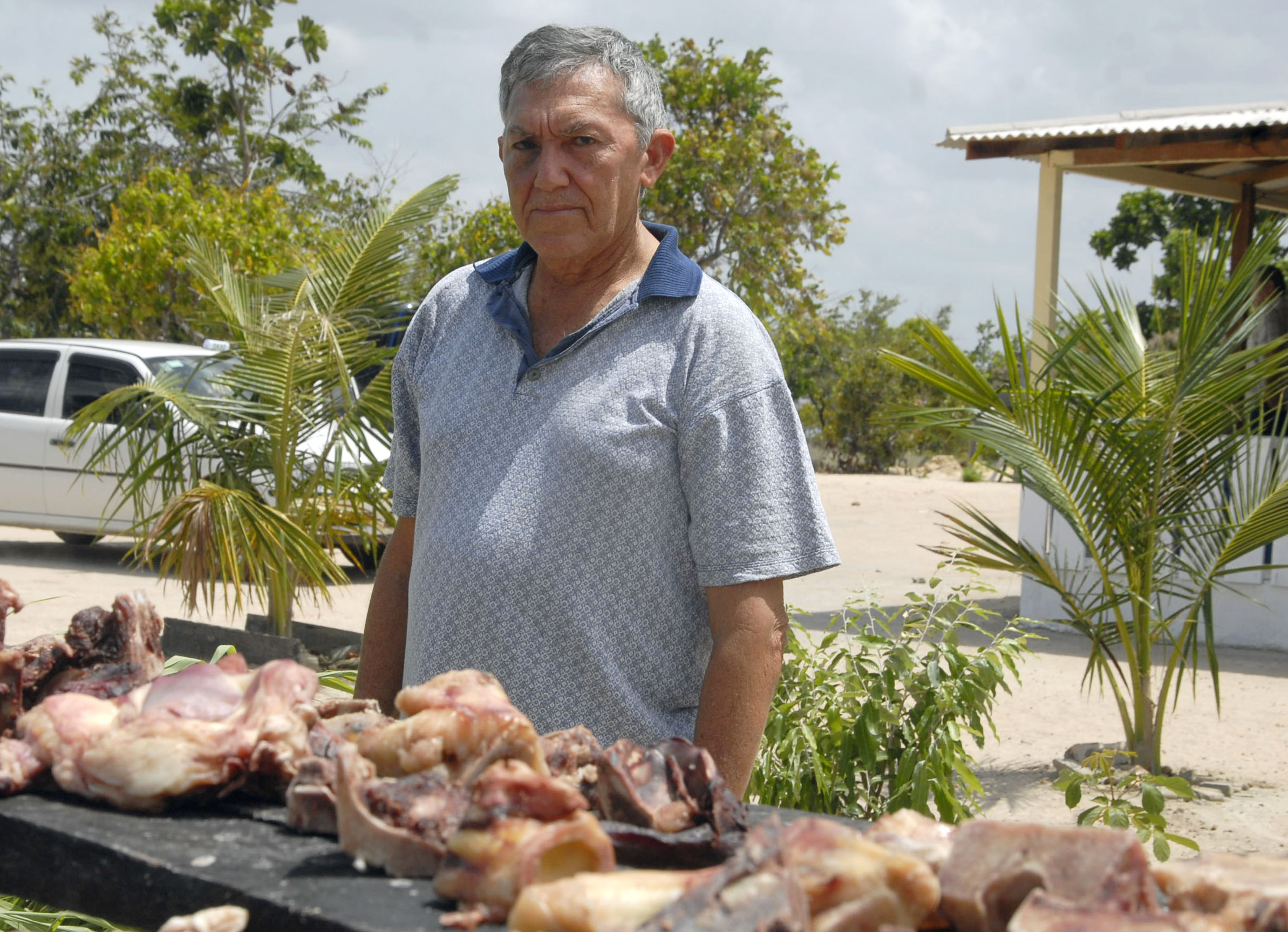
Farmer preparing carne de sol

Carne de sol ([ˈkaʁni dʒi ˈsɔw], Portuguese for "sun meat"), or jabá ([ʒaˈba]) is a dish from Northeastern Brazil. It is made by cutting beef into "blankets" which are then lightly salted. The blankets are then placed outside in a dry and ventilated area to cure.

Carne de sol is sometimes fried and served as a sandwich, or baked in the oven with cream or, more traditionally, prepared as savory paçoca.

Its origin is attributed to the sertanejos living in the semi-arid countryside, who developed this local recipe to preserve meat. The dish is traditional and typical of the entire northeast region of Brazil, and is served in restaurants all across the country.

== See also ==
- Charque
- Bresaola
- Dried meat
- List of Brazilian dishes
- List of dried foods
