= Dutch oven =

Cooking pot with thick walls and a lid

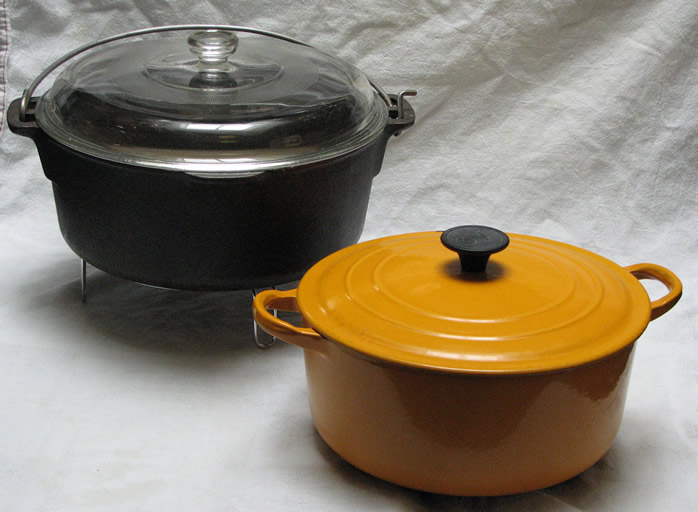
Dutch ovens

A Dutch oven, Dutch pot (US English), or casserole dish (international) is a thick-walled cooking pot with a tight-fitting lid. Dutch ovens are usually made of seasoned cast iron; however, some Dutch ovens are instead made of cast aluminium, or ceramic. Some metal varieties are enameled rather than being seasoned, and these are sometimes called French ovens. The international name casserole dish is from the French casserole which means "cooking pot". They are similar to both the Japanese tetsunabe and the sač, a traditional Balkan cast-iron oven, and are related to the South African potjie, the Australian Bedourie oven and Spanish cazuela.

== History ==
=== Early European history ===
During the 17th century, brass was the preferred metal for English cookware and domestic utensils, and the Dutch produced it at the lowest cost, which, however, was still expensive. In 1702, Abraham Darby was a partner in the Brass Works Company of Bristol, which made malt mills for breweries. Apparently in 1704, Darby visited the Netherlands, where he studied the Dutch methods of working brass, including the casting of brass pots. Darby learned that when making castings, the Dutch used molds made of sand, rather than the traditional loam and clay, and this innovation produced a finer finish on their brassware. In 1706 he started a new brass mill in the Baptist Mills area of Bristol. There, Darby realized that he could sell more kitchen wares if he could replace brass with a cheaper metal, namely, cast iron. Initial experiments to cast iron in sand molds were unsuccessful, but with the aid of one of his workers, James Thomas, a Welshman, he succeeded in casting iron cookware. In 1707 he obtained a patent for the process of casting iron in sand, which derived from the Dutch process. Thus, the term "Dutch oven" has endured for over 300 years, since at least 1710. (Note: The Merriam-Webster Dictionary states that the term "Dutch oven" first appeared in print in 1769. EtymologyOnLine also states that the first occurrence of the term "Dutch oven" was in 1769. Indeed, a "Dutch oven" is mentioned in the records of the Augusta county (Virginia) courthouse for 20 October 1769.) The Merriam-Webster Dictionary and Researching Food History agree that several very different cooking devices were called "Dutch ovens" — a cast-iron pan with legs and a lid; a roughly rectangular box that was open on one side and that was used to roast meats, and a compartment in a brick hearth that was used for baking.

=== American history ===
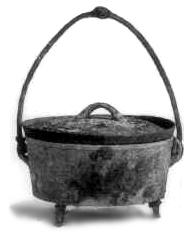
An American Dutch oven, 1896

American Dutch ovens changed over time during the colonial era. These changes included a shallower pot, legs to hold the oven above the coals, and a lid flange to keep the coals on the lid and out of the food. Paul Revere has been credited with the design of the flat lid with a ridge for holding coals as well as the addition of legs to the pots.

Colonists and settlers valued cast-iron cookware because of its versatility and durability. Cooks used them to boil, bake, stew, fry, and roast. The ovens were so valuable that wills in the 18th and 19th centuries frequently spelled out their desired inheritor. For example, Mary Ball Washington (mother of President George Washington) specified in her will, dated 20 May 1788, that one-half of her "iron kitchen furniture" should go to her son-in-law, Fielding Lewis, and the other half to Betty Carter, a granddaughter. This bequest included several Dutch ovens.

Westward-bound settlers took Dutch ovens with them. A Dutch oven was among the gear Lewis and Clark carried when they explored the great American Northwest between 1804 and 1806. Mormon pioneers who settled the American West also took along their Dutch ovens. In fact, a statue raised to honor the Mormon handcart companies who entered Utah's Salt Lake Valley in the 1850s proudly displays a Dutch oven hanging from the front of the handcart. The Dutch oven is also the official state cooking pot of Texas, Utah, and Arkansas.

Mountain men exploring the American frontier used Dutch ovens into the late 19th century. Chuckwagons accompanying western cattle drives also carried Dutch ovens from the mid-19th century into the early 20th century.

=== Dutch history ===
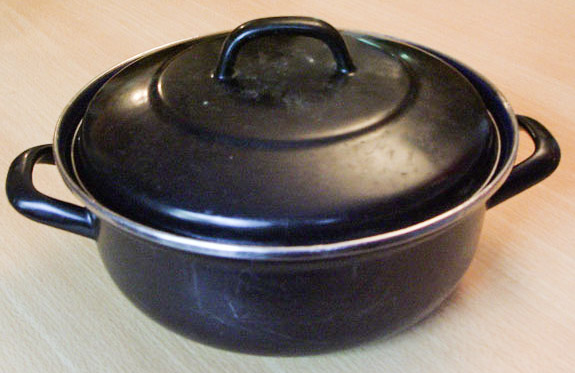
A Dutch oven, or braadpan, as it is used in the Netherlands today

In the Netherlands, a Dutch oven is called a braadpan, which literally translates to roasting pan. Another name for it is sudderpan, which literally translates to "simmerpan" or "simmering pot". The design most used today is a black enameled steel pan that is suitable for gas and induction heating. The model was introduced in 1891 by BK, a well-known Dutch manufacturer of cookware. Cheaper and lighter in weight than cast iron, it proved to be a revolution in the kitchen. A braadpan is mainly used for frying meat only, but it can also be used for making traditional stews, such as hachée. Cast-iron models exist, but are used less frequently.

== Types ==
=== Camping ===
A camping, cowboy, or chuckwagon Dutch oven usually has three integral legs, a wire bail handle, and a slightly concave, rimmed lid so that coals from the cooking fire can be placed on top as well as below. This provides more uniform internal heat and lets the inside act as an oven. A Dutch oven without integral legs can be used as a conventional pot on a stove, or may be set on a separate welded steel or cast iron tripod stand or on small stones when cooking on hot coals. These ovens are typically made of bare cast iron, although some are aluminium. The bail handle facilitates lifting the Dutch oven onto and off the coals, using a metal hook. Dutch ovens are often used in Scouting outdoor activities.

=== Bedourie oven ===
In Australia, a bedourie camp oven is a steel cookpot, shaped and used like a Dutch oven. Named after Bedourie, Queensland, the Bedourie ovens were developed as a more robust, non-breakable alternative to the cast-iron Dutch ovens.

=== Potjie ===
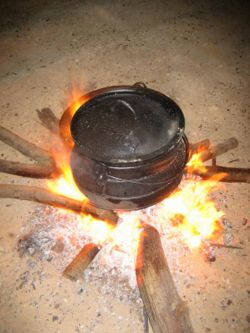
A cast-iron potjie on a fire

In South Africa, a potjie (/ˈpɔɪki/ POY-kee) directly translated "pottle or little pot" from Afrikaans or Dutch, is unlike most other Dutch ovens, in that it is round-bottomed. Traditionally it is a single cast, cast-iron pot, reinforced with external double or triple circumscribing ribs, a bail handle for suspending the pot, and three short legs for resting the pot. It is similar in appearance to a cauldron, to which it is also more closely related in terms of function than other Dutch oven examples. It has a matching handled lid, which is domed, and features a small rim to allow for hot coals to rest on top, providing additional heat from above.

While the first "Dutch ovens" were in fact a new style of cookware made of cast iron, developed in England but directly inspired by the Dutch method of casting brass, the potjie pot itself is in turn a later Dutch usage of this English method of casting iron, on an older style of cookware. In this case, 18th century Dutch -speaking settlers in South Africa used modern iron casting methods in the production of traditional three-legged cauldrons. As a result, in shape the potjie can be directly visually compared to brass cast Dutch cauldrons from before the advent of 18th century cast iron.

Thus, it is a regional direct combination of both cauldrons and the Dutch oven. As it more closely follows the design of traditional three-legged cauldrons, its lid is not as practical for holding hot coals nor providing downwards heat as Dutch ovens, which were designed with this purpose with a flat lid and more established rim.

When the vessel is to be stored long term, care must be taken to avoid rust forming by seasoning. "Potjie" can also refer to the technique of cooking potjiekos. Among the recipes that require a potjie, there is one for a type of bread called "potbrood", which literally means "pot bread".

Among the South African indigenous peoples, specifically Zulus, these pots also became known as phutu pots, after a popular food prepared in it. The larger pots are normally used for large gatherings, e.g., funerals or weddings, to prepare large quantities of food. Wooden spoons called kombe in the Tsonga language are used for mixing and stirring.

This tradition persisted over the years and survives today as a traditional Southern African method of cooking.

=== Chugunok ===
In Eastern Europe, but mostly in Russia, a chugunok is a cast-iron pot used in a modern oven or in a traditional Russian oven, hearth, or a campfire. A chugunok is used in a variety of cooking methods, including high temperature cooking, low-temperature cooking, thermal cooking, slow cooking, smothering, roasting, baking, braising, and stewing.

The shape of a chugunok is similar to a traditional crock with a narrow top and bottom and wider in the middle. When used inside a traditional oven, a long handled holding tool called ukhvat is used handle chugunok in the oven. Since a chugunok has no handles, it's inconvenient to use a it on a kitchen stove.

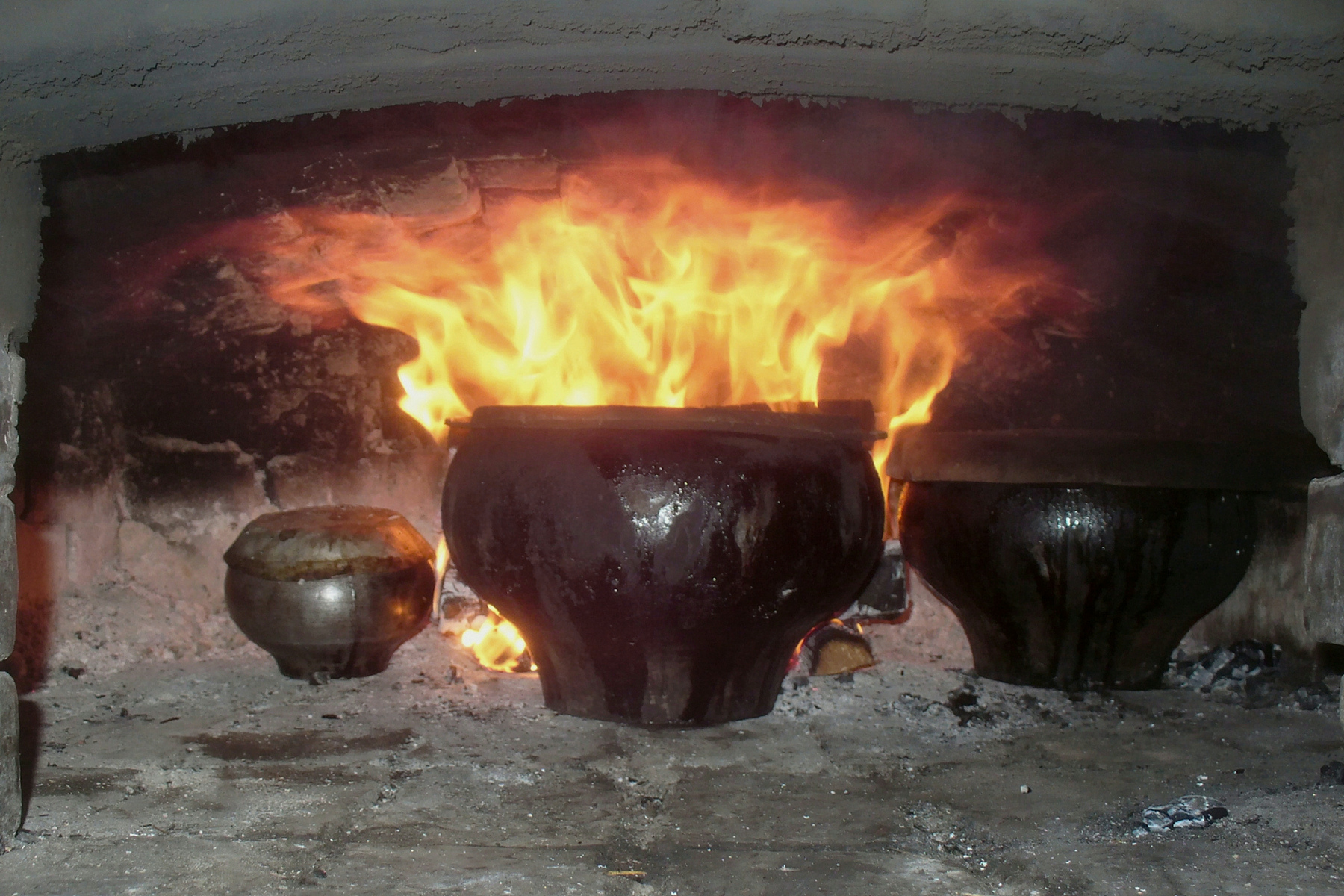
A variety of chugunoks are used to prepare an entire meal

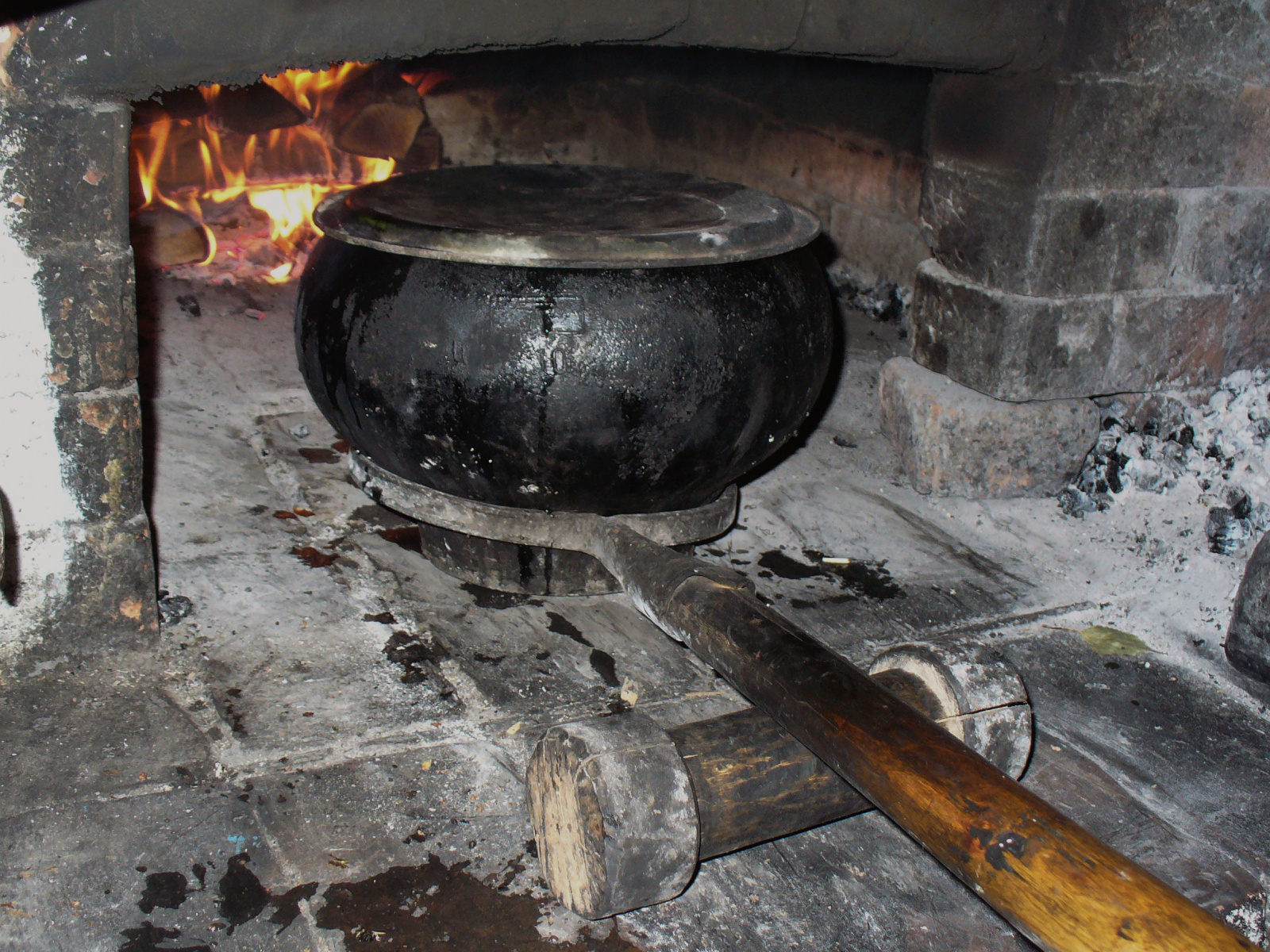
Chugunok with a long handled ukhvat and lifting roller

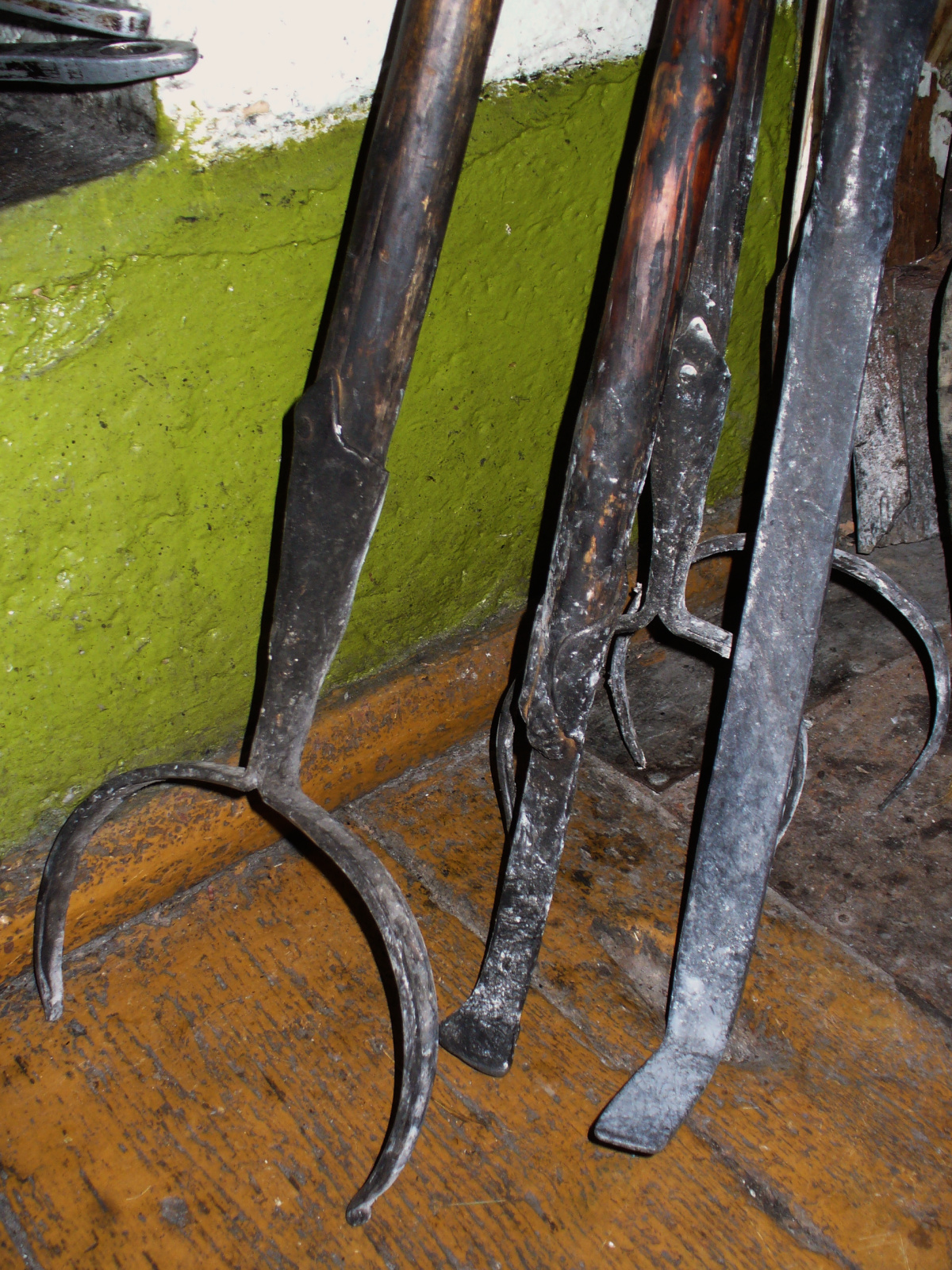
Ukhvat

== Use in cooking and baking ==
Dutch ovens are well suited for long, slow cooking, such as roasts, stews, and casseroles, either in an oven or on a cooktop. Virtually any recipe that can be cooked in a conventional oven can be cooked in a Dutch oven.

=== Outdoor cooking ===
Traditional "camping Dutch ovens," also known as lipped cast-iron Dutch ovens, are particularly effective as baking ovens over outdoor open fires. Smaller interchangeable cooking inserts can be placed inside the oven to cook individual batches or dishes. Additionally, Dutch ovens' ability to simultaneously provide and retain conductive energy can be leveraged by directly stacking them over the open fire, permitting transfer of heat energy between and among each other.

=== Baking ===
Dutch ovens are known to be particularly useful in the baking of breads best produced at high temperatures and high, consistent humidity. Аs heated steam escapes the dough, the oven's heavy lid prevents the vapor from escaping, providing a consistent, somewhat pressurized humid environment inside the oven. This humidity in turn provides essential convection transfer, encouraging a crispy, darker crust which is highly desirable for some breads including sourdoughs, ciabattas, sweet French bread, and Dutch crunch.

Dutch ovens also hold significantly more energy density than most cooking tools, such as traditional sauce pans or stock pots. The oven's ability to retain energy while providing consistent conductive transfer to the dough permits a desired caramelization nearly impossible from thinner, less energy-dense materials.

== See also ==
- List of cooking techniques
- List of cooking vessels
- Outdoor cooking
- Seasoning of a Dutch oven
