= Culture of Africa =

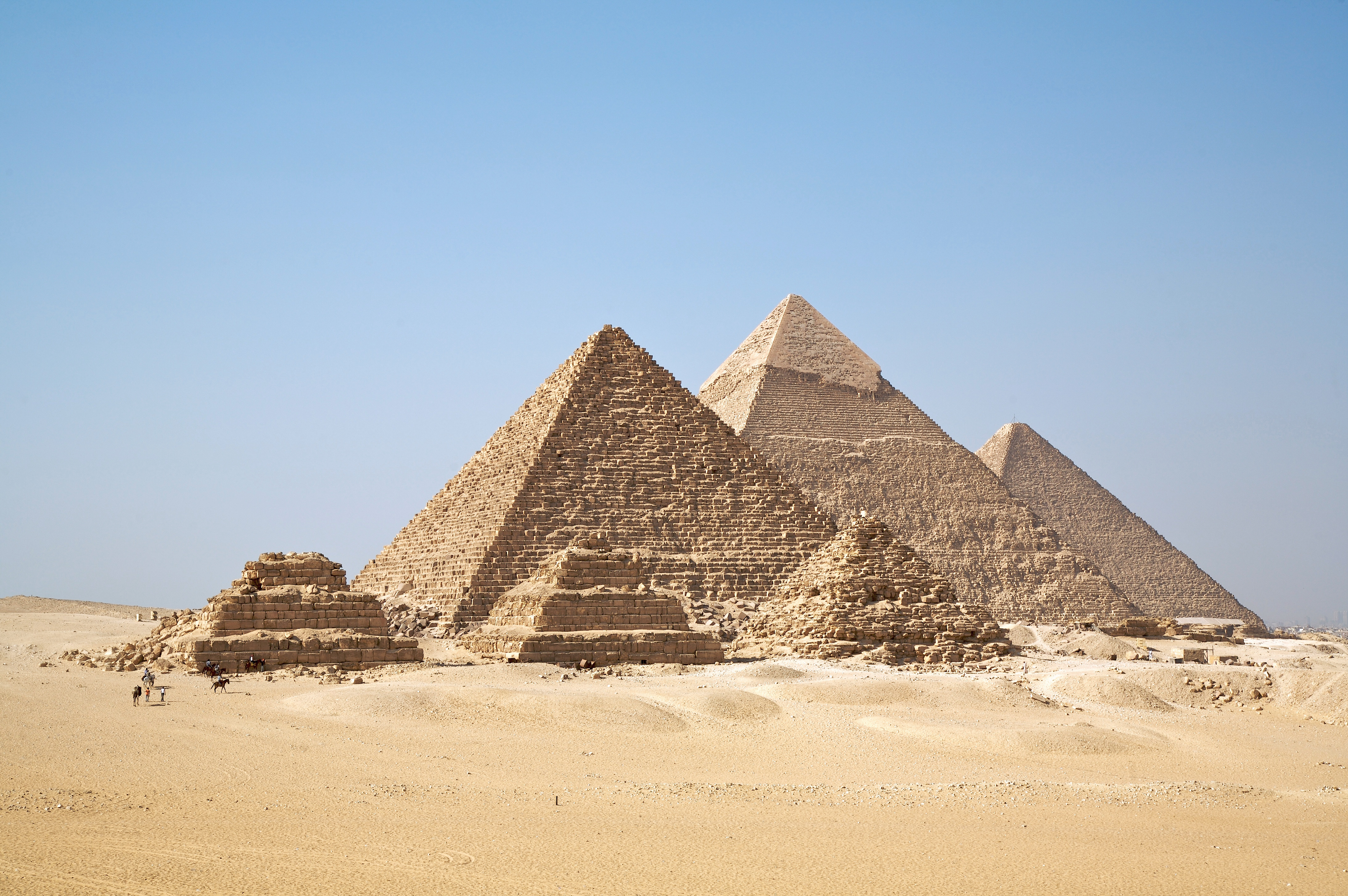
The Great Pyramids of Giza, Egypt

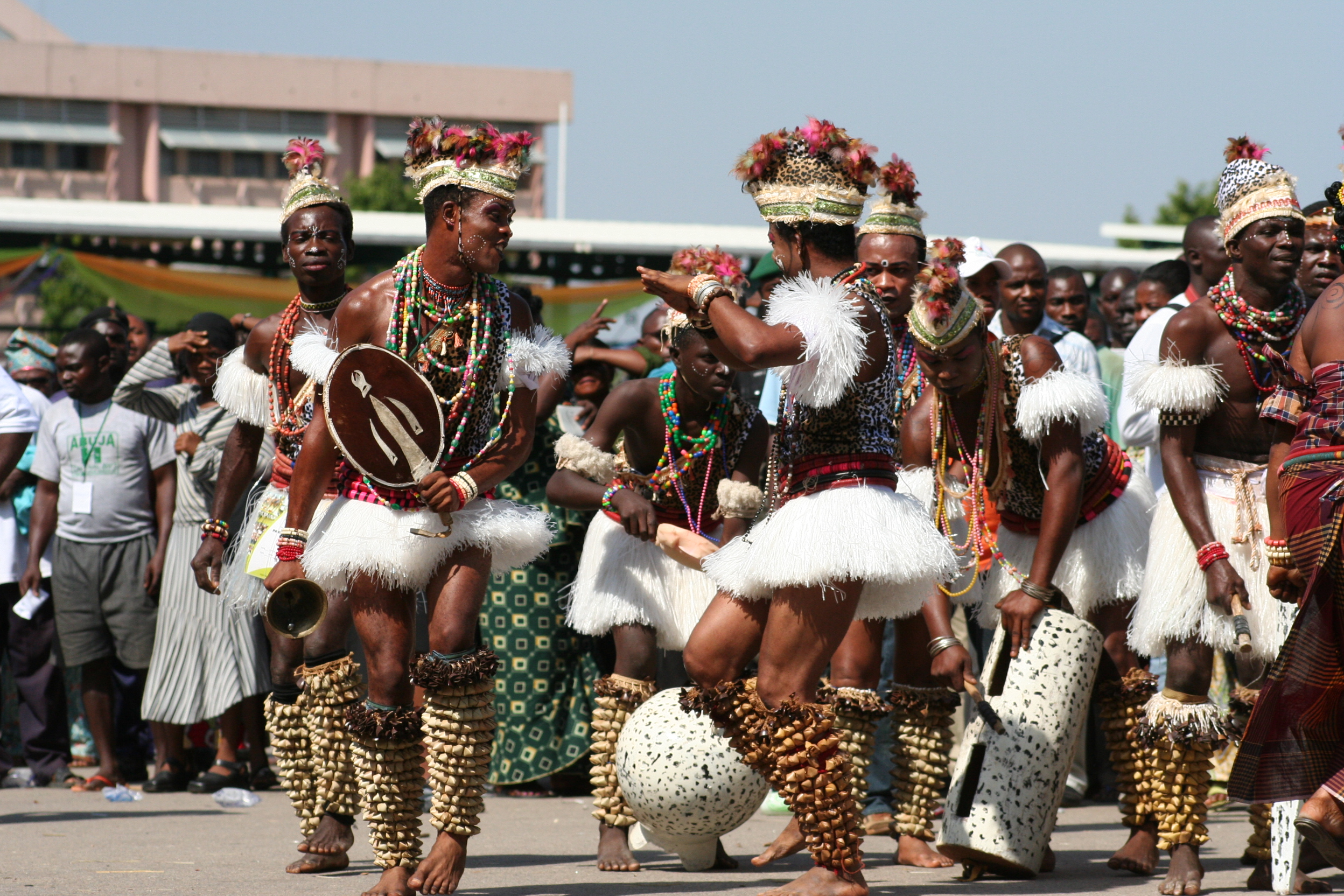
Traditional male dancers from Northern Nigeria

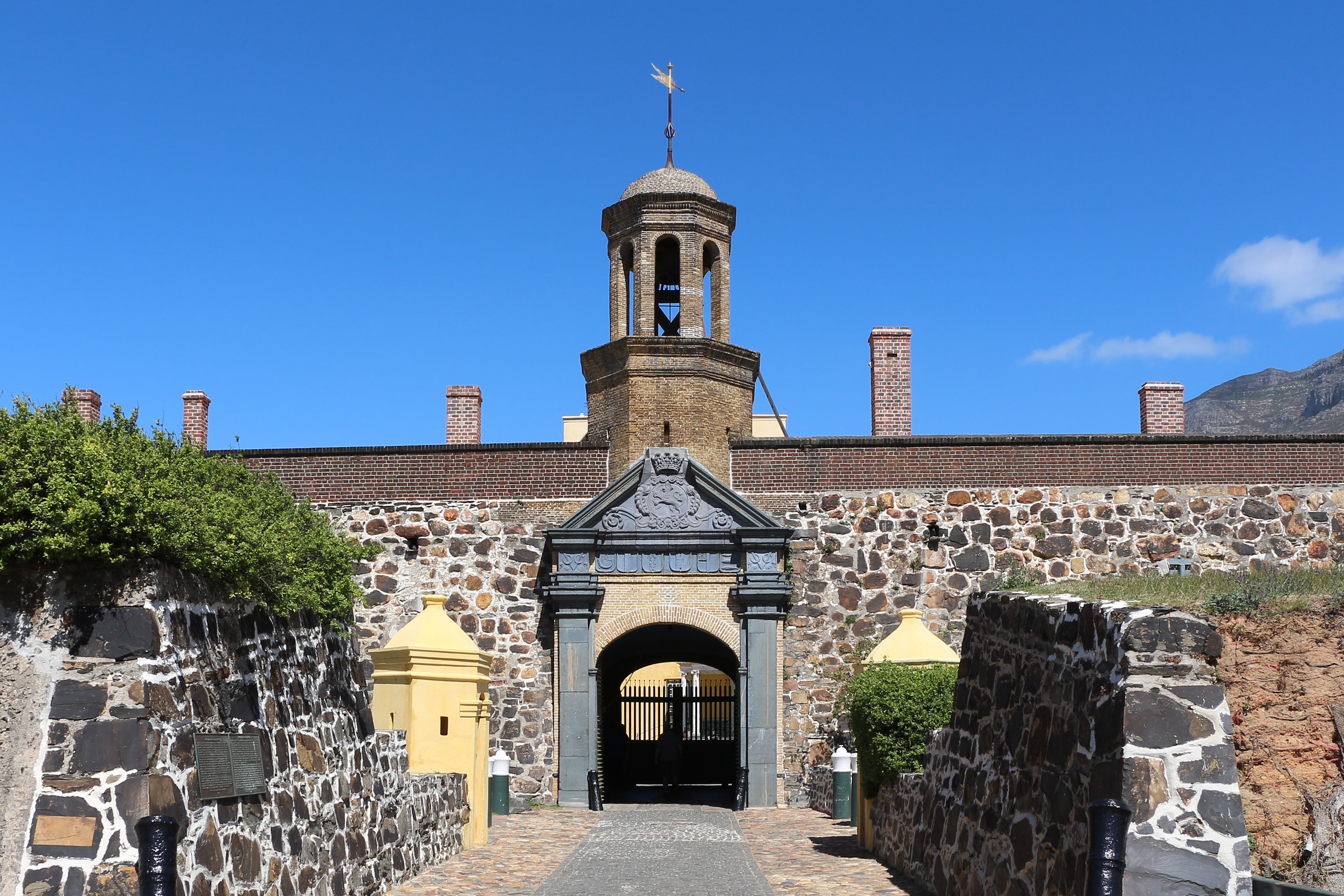
Gateway to the Castle of Good Hope in South Africa

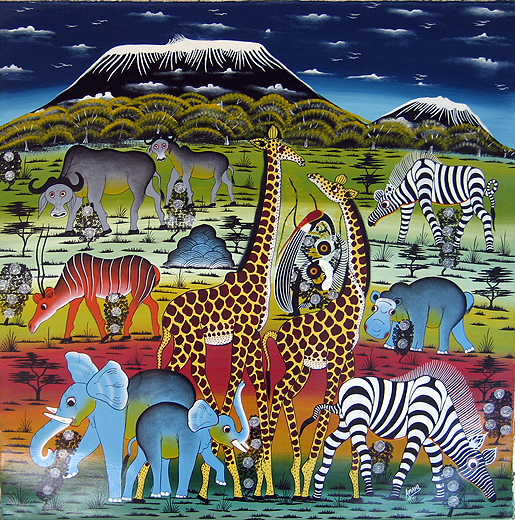
Tingatinga is one of the most widely represented forms of paintings in Tanzania, Kenya and neighbouring countries.

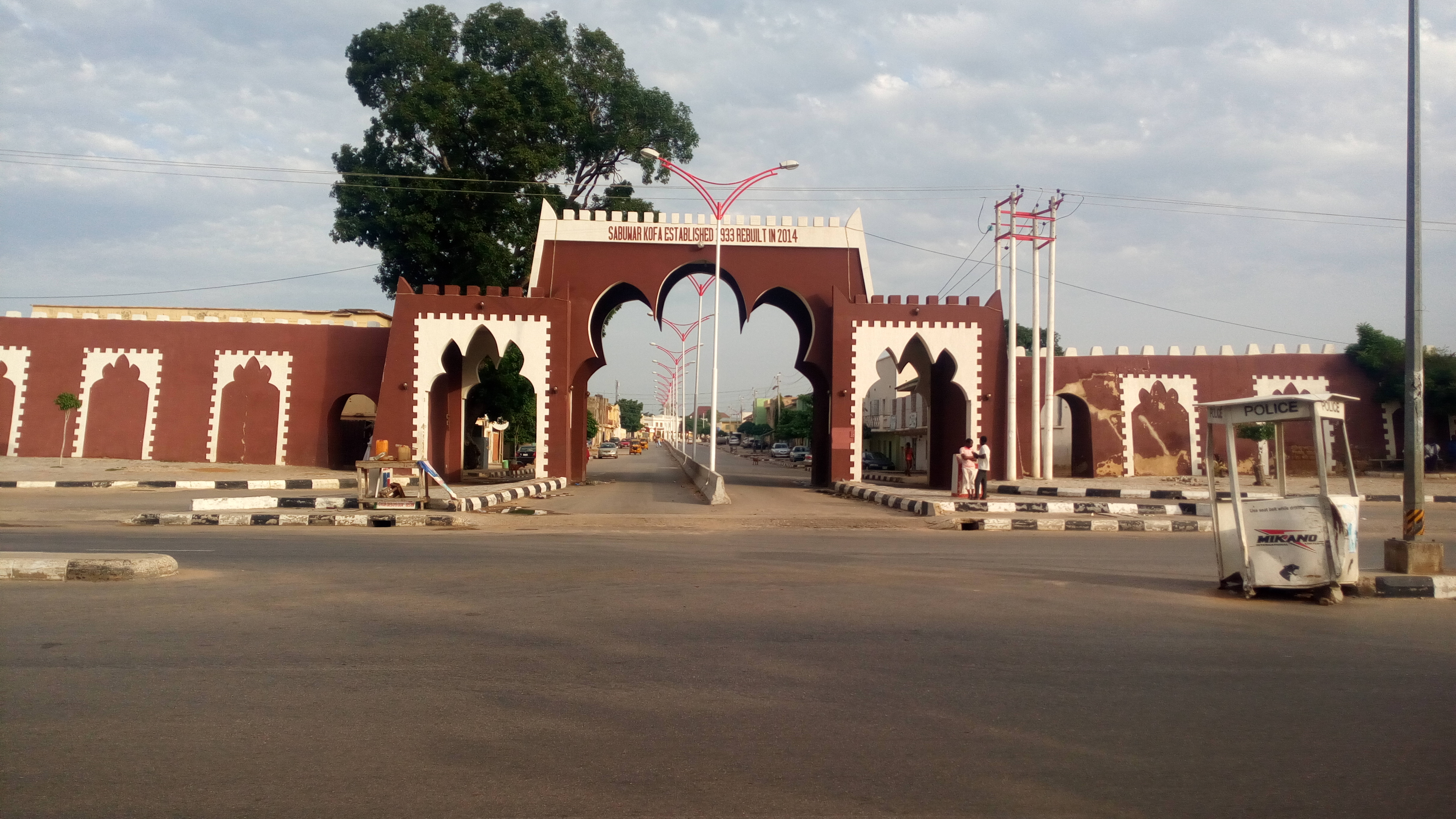
Ancient Kano City Walls, Nigeria

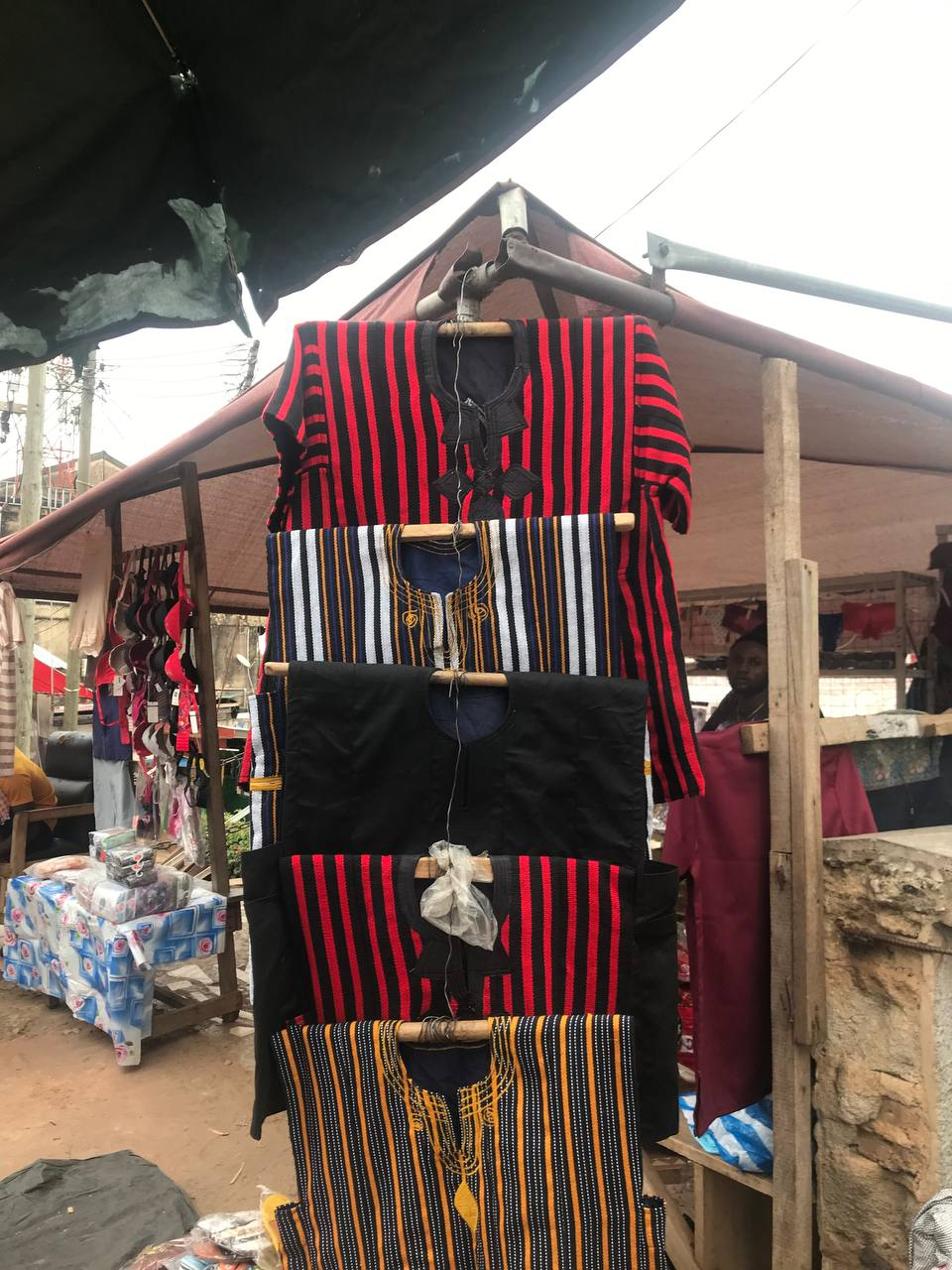
Display of African cultural apparel (smock)

The culture of Africa is varied and manifold, consisting of a mixture of countries with various peoples depicting their unique characteristic and trait from the continent of Africa. It is a product of the diverse populations that inhabit the continent of Africa and the African diaspora. Generally, Culture can be defined as a collective mass of distinctive qualities belonging to a certain group of people. These qualities include laws, morals, beliefs, knowledge, art, customs, and any other attributes belonging to a member of that society. Culture is the way of life of a group of people.

Africa has numerous ethnic nationalities all with varying qualities such as language, dishes, greetings, dressing, dances and music. However, each of the regions of Africa share a series of dominant cultural traits which distinguish various African regional cultures from each other and the rest of the world. For example, social values, religion, morals, political values, economics, and aesthetic values all contribute to various African cultures. Expressions of culture are abundant within Africa, with large amounts of cultural diversity being found not only across different countries but also within single countries. Even though within various regions, the cultures are widely diverse, they are also, when closely studied, seen to have many similarities; for example, the morals they uphold, their love and respect for their culture, as well as the strong respect they hold for the aged and the important, i.e. kings and chiefs.

Africa has influenced and been influenced by other continents. This can be portrayed in the willingness to adapt to the ever-changing modern world rather than staying rooted in their static culture. The Westernized few, persuaded by American culture and Christianity, first denied African traditional culture, but with the increase of African nationalism, a cultural recovery occurred. The governments of most African nations encourage national dance and music groups, museums, and to a lower degree, artists and writers.

90% to 95% of Africa's cultural heritage is held outside of Africa by large museums. In a BBC report on defining factors of identity, "50-60% of British black African/Caribbean respondents, agreed that ethnicity played a key role, the largest of any group. The singular viewpoint of ‘black’ as an ‘identifier’ or an ‘ethnicity’ not only denies cultural differences between the population, it also denies the nuance within a vastly diverse community…. When we attempt to define African culture and identity, we have to be mindful that we are viewing a broad ethnicity comprising different sub communities that are resistant to having their heritage and culture boxed in simplistic labels.”

African cultures, which originated on the continent of Africa, have several distinct differences than that of Black culture, which is originated by African Americans in the United States after they were stripped of most of their own African cultures during enslavement.

== Historical overview ==
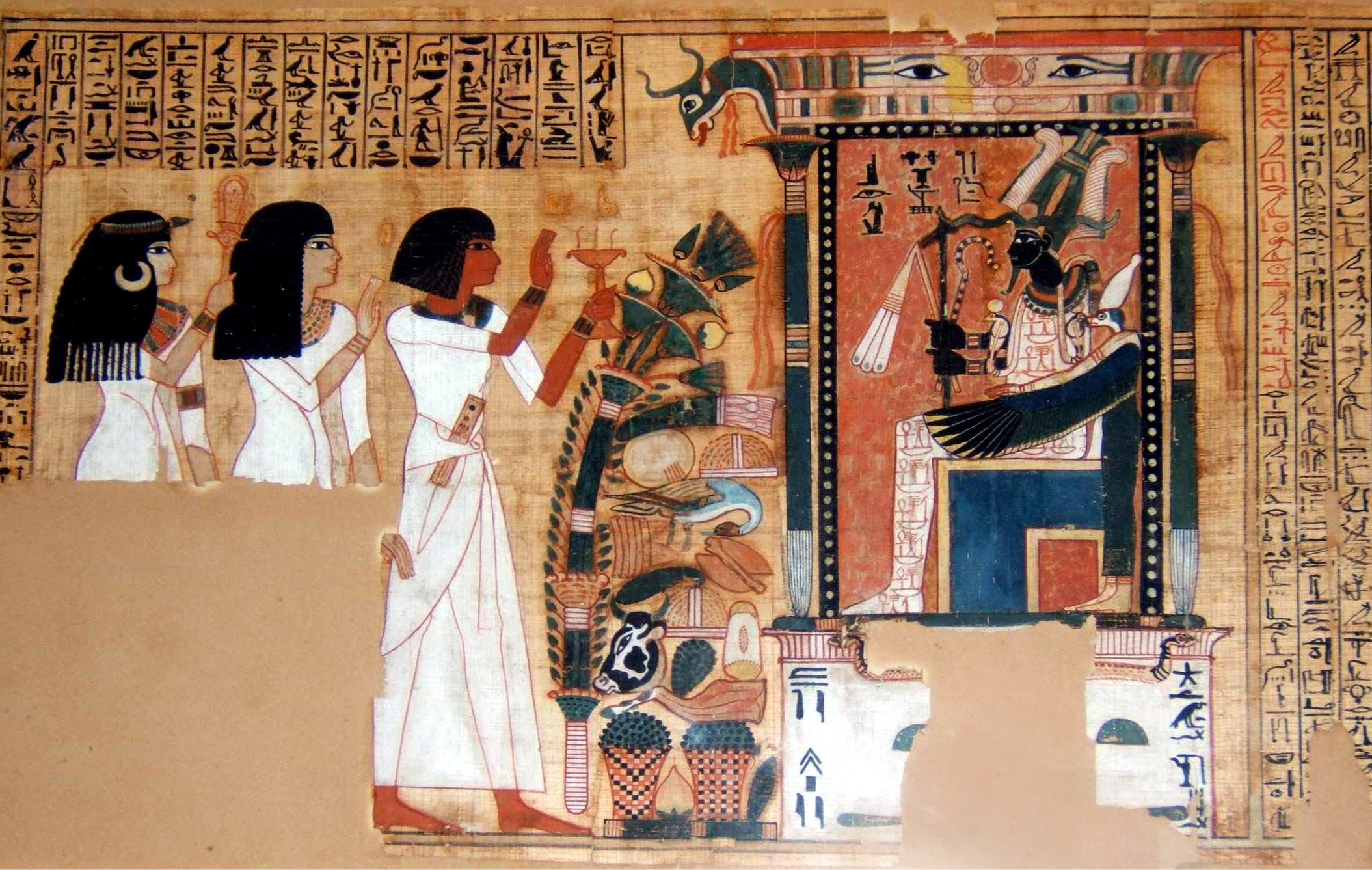
Sample of the Egyptian Book of the Dead of the scribe Nebqed, c. 1300 BC

Africa is divided into a great number of ethnic cultures. The continent's cultural regeneration has also been an integral aspect of post-independence nation-building on the continent, with a recognition of the need to harness the cultural resources of Africa to enrich the process of education, requiring the creation of an enabling environment in several ways. In recent times, the call for a much greater emphasis on the cultural dimension in all aspects of development has become increasingly vocal. During the Roman colonization of North Africa (parts of Algeria, Libya, Egypt, and the whole of Tunisia), provinces such as Tripolitania became major producers of food for the republic and the empire. This generated much wealth in these places for their 400 years of occupation.

During colonialism in Africa, Europeans possessed attitudes of superiority and a sense of mission. The French accepted an African as French if that person gave up their African culture and adopted French ways. Knowledge of the Portuguese language and culture and abandonment of traditional African ways defined one as civilized. (See also: Britons in Africa#Culture)

Kenyan social commentator Mwiti Mugambi argues that the future of Africa can only be forged from accepting and mending the sociocultural present. For Mugambi, colonial cultural hangovers, pervasive Western cultural inundation, and aid-giving arm-twisting donors are, he argues, here to stay and no amount of looking into Africa's past will make them go away. However, Maulana Karenga states:

Our culture provides us with an ethos we must honor in both thought and practice. By ethos, we mean a people's self-understanding as well as its self-presentation in the world through its thought and practice in the other six areas of culture. It is, above all, a cultural challenge. For culture is here defined as the totality of thought and practice by which a people creates itself, celebrates, sustains and develops itself and introduces itself to history and humanity

— Maulana Karenga, African Culture and the Ongoing Quest for Excellence

== African arts and crafts ==
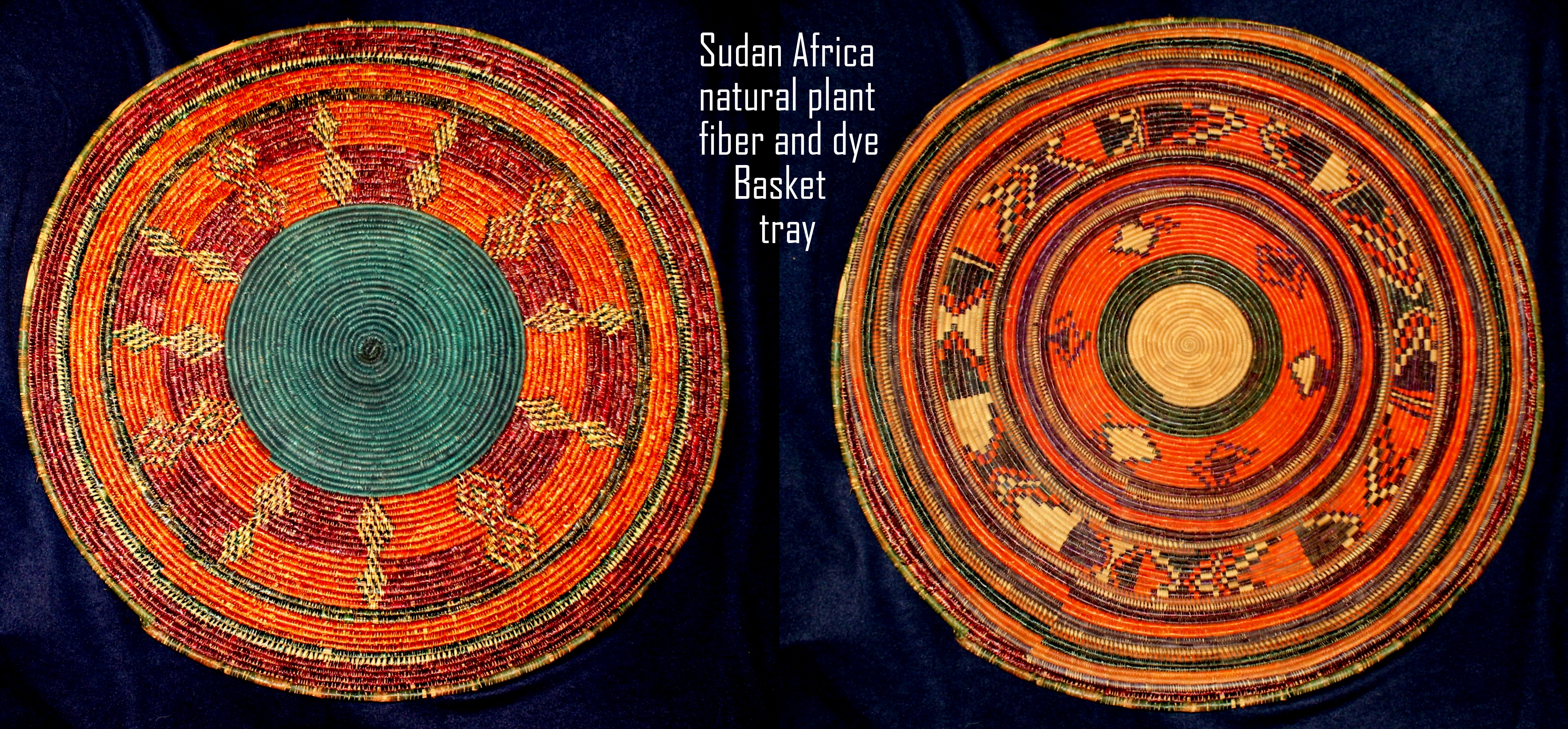
Sudan basket-tray, tabar of weaved natural plant fiber, in different colors

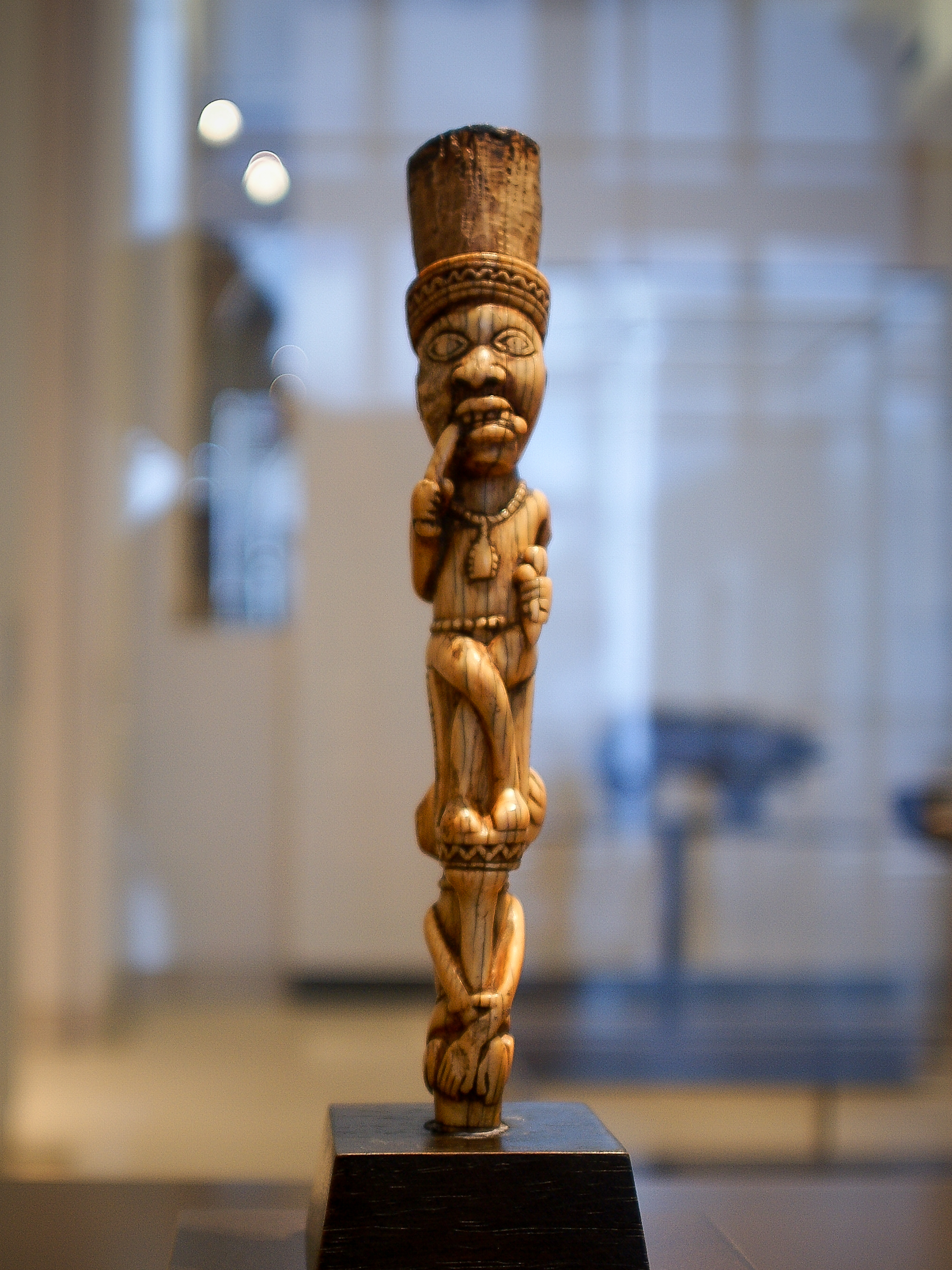
A Yombe sculpture (Louvre, Paris)

Africa has a rich tradition of arts and crafts.

African arts and crafts find expression in a variety of woodcarvings, brass and leather artworks. African arts and crafts also include sculpture, paintings, pottery, ceremonial and religious headgear and dress. Maulana Karenga states that in African art, the object was not as important as the soul force behind the creation of the object. He also states that All art must be revolutionary, and in being revolutionary, it must be collective, committing, and functional. The meaning behind what he said can simply be interpreted as black art serving an actual purpose in the direction of a revolutionary change. Black art should not be done simply for "arts sake" but should rather be a means by which artists make a vast change through a medium that awakens, strengthens, and provides inspiration for a massive change within the black community.

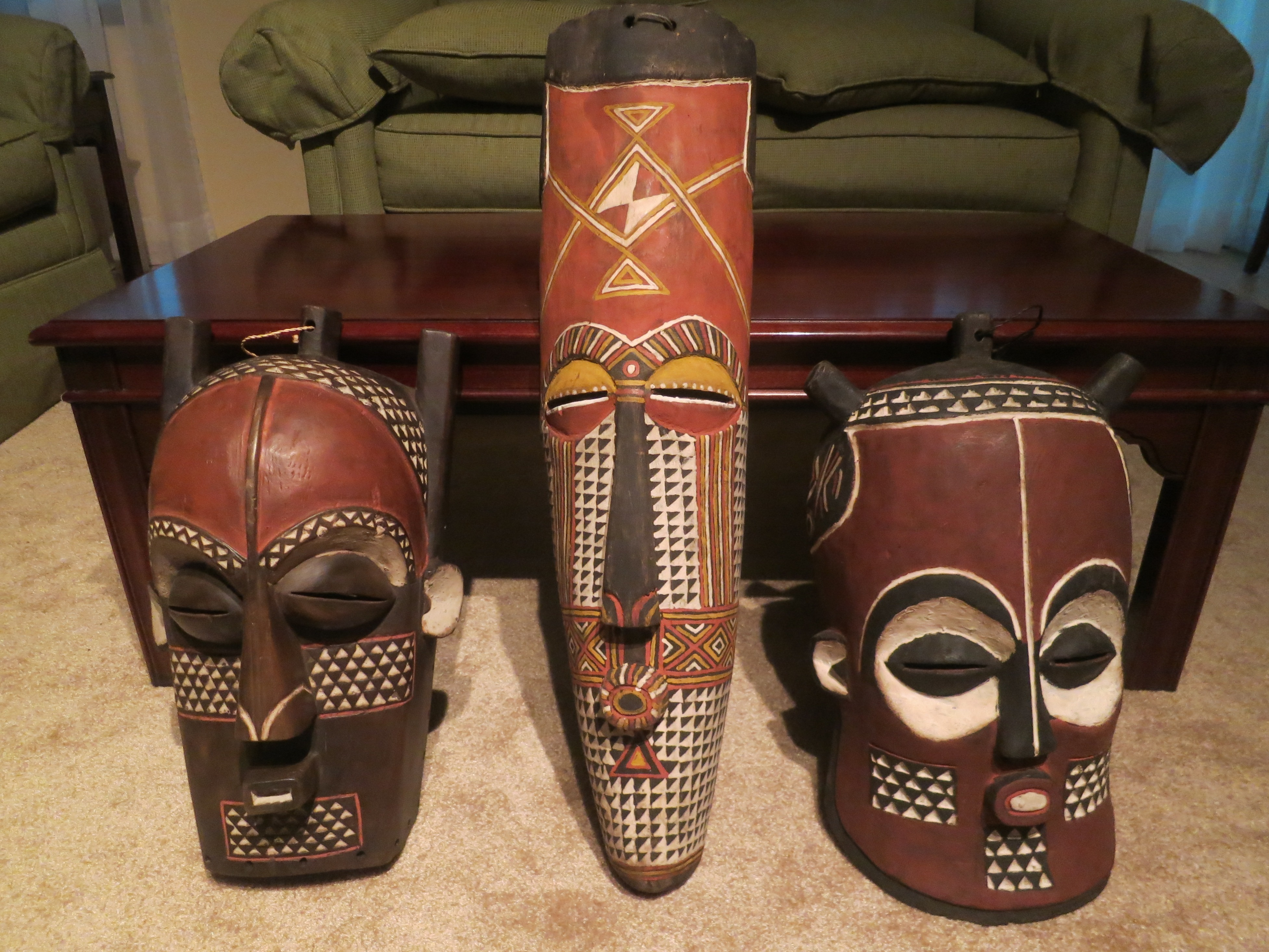
BaKongo masks from the Kongo Central region

Certain African cultures have always emphasized personal appearance, and jewelry has remained an important personal accessory. Many pieces of such jewelry are made of cowry shells and similar materials. Similarly, masks are made with elaborate designs and are an important part of some cultures in Africa. Masks are used in various ceremonies depicting ancestors and spirits, mythological characters, and deities.

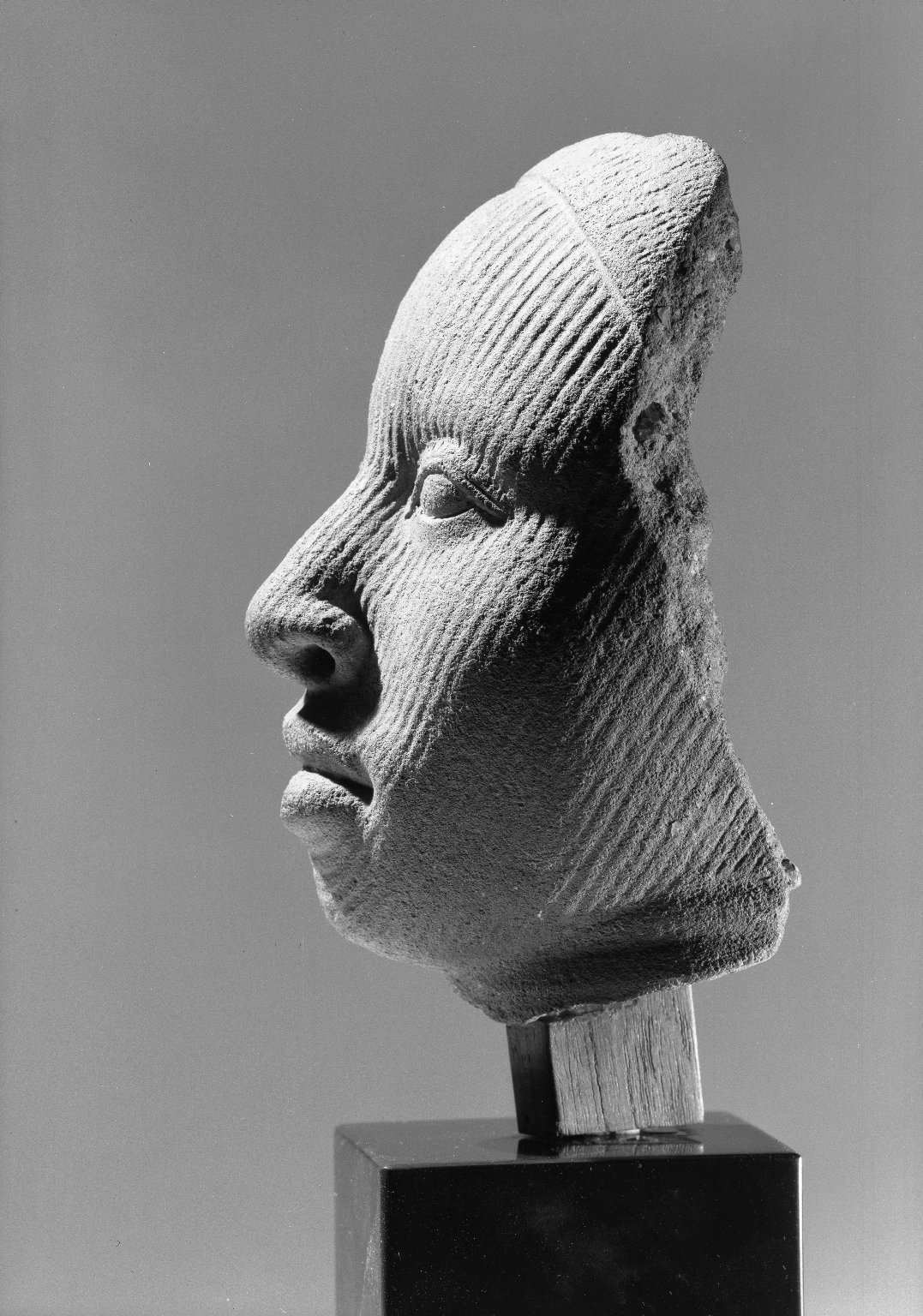
A realistic terracotta head sculpture (1100–1500) of the Yoruba representing the oni or king of Ife

In many traditional arts and craft traditions in Africa, certain themes significant to those particular cultures recur, including a couple, a woman with a child, a male with a weapon or animal, and an outsider or a stranger. Couples may represent ancestors, community founders, married couples, or twins. The couple theme rarely exhibits the intimacy of men and women. The mother with the child or children reveals the intense desire of the women to have children. The theme is also representative of mother mars and the people as her children. The man with the weapon or animal theme symbolizes honor and power. A stranger may be from some other tribe or someone from a different country, and a more distorted portrayal of the stranger indicates a proportionately greater gap from the stranger. These are all popular interpretations of African craft and art.

== Folklore and religion ==
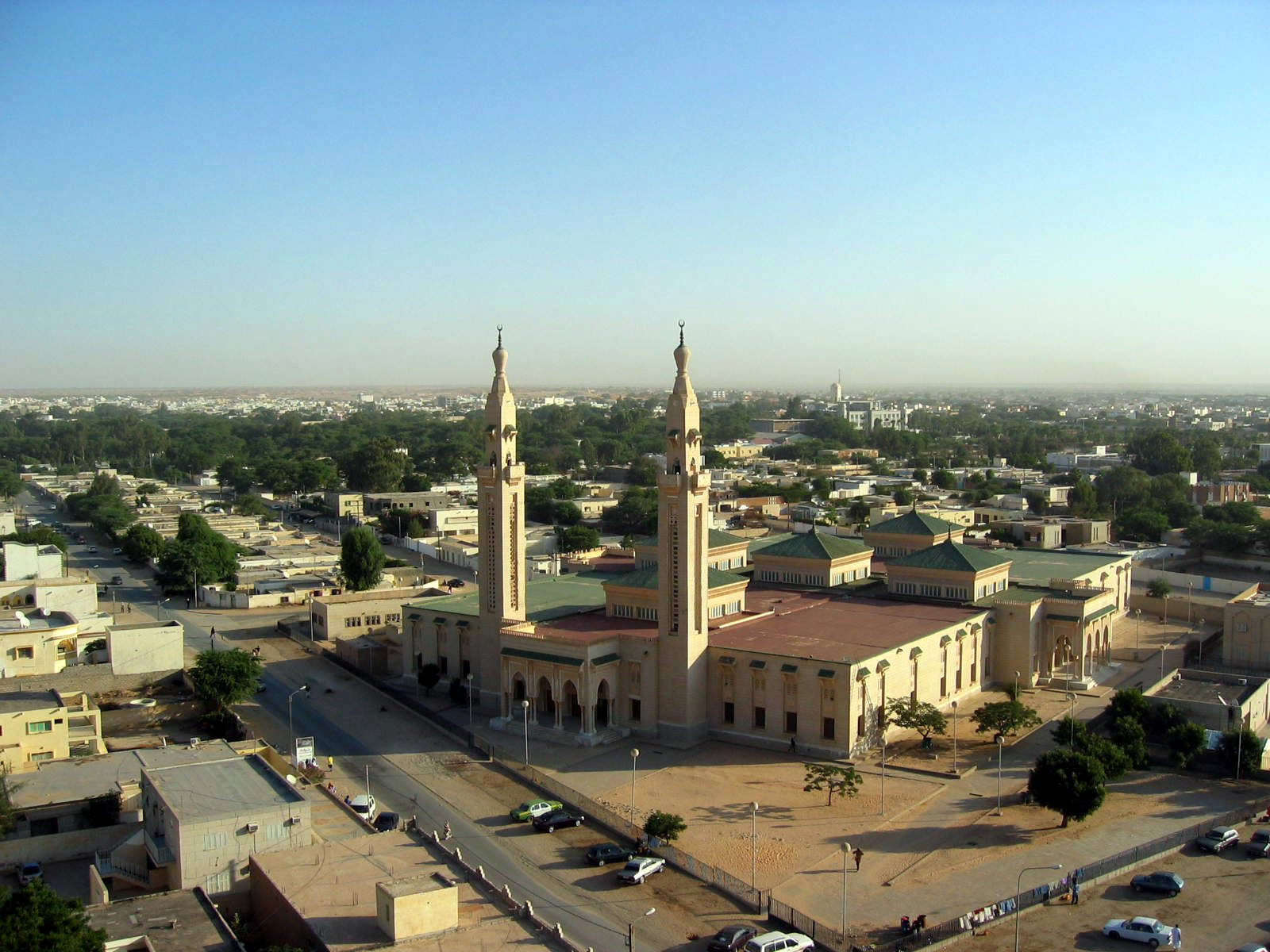
Central mosque in Nouakchott, Mauritania

Like all human cultures, African folklore and religion represents a variety of social facets of the various cultures in Africa. Like almost all civilizations and cultures, flood myths have been circulating in different parts of Africa. Culture and religion share space and are deeply intertwined in African cultures. In Ethiopia, Christianity and Islam form the core aspects of Ethiopian culture and inform dietary customs and rituals and rites. According to a myth among Central African foragers, Chameleon, hearing a strange noise in a tree, cut open its trunk, and water came out in a great flood that spread all over the land.

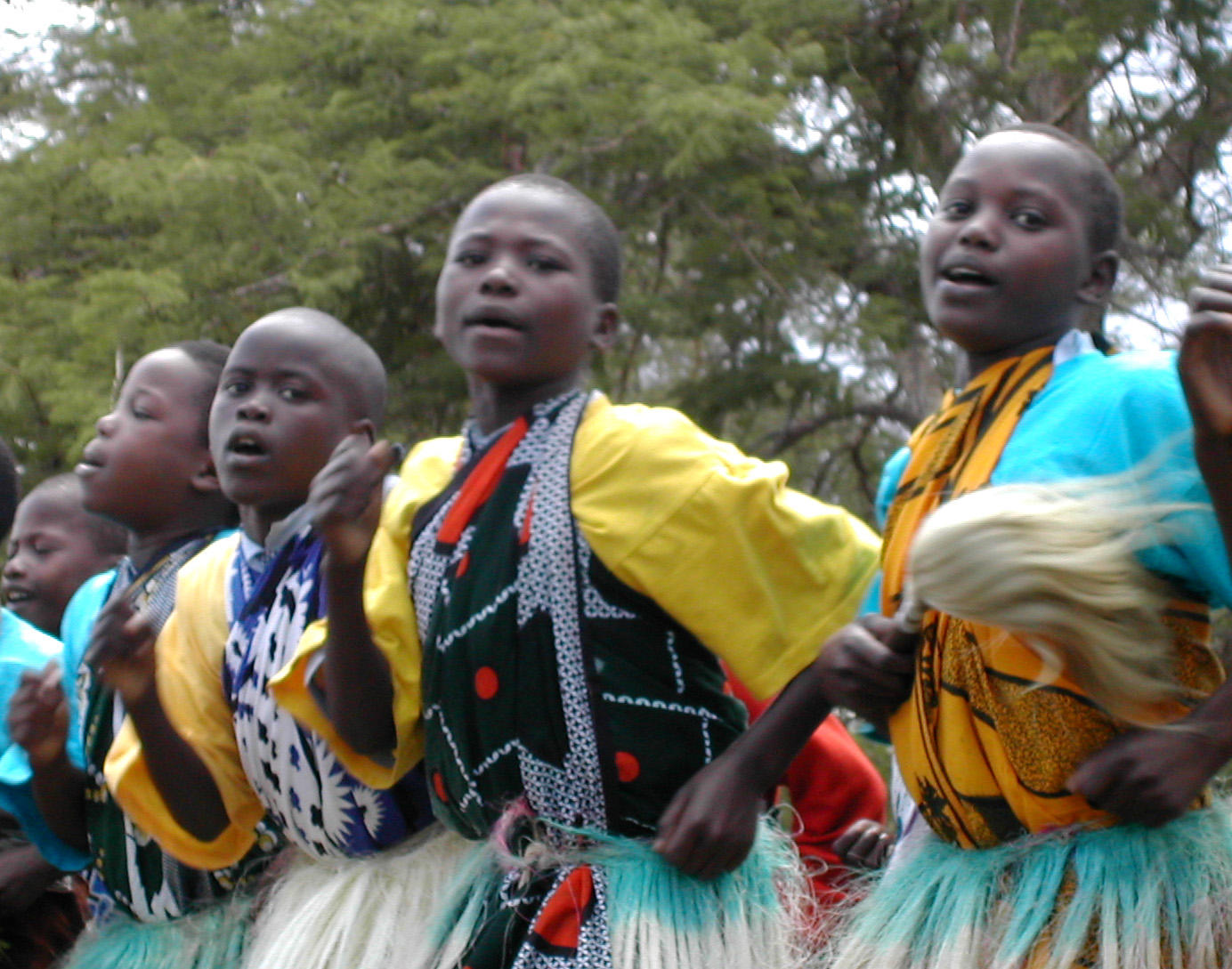
Kenyan boys and girls performing a traditional folklore dance

Folktales also play an important role in many African cultures. Stories reflect a group's cultural identity, and preserving the stories of Africa will help preserve an entire culture. Storytelling affirms pride and identity in a culture. In Africa, stories are created by and for the ethnic group telling them. Different ethnic groups in Africa have different rituals or ceremonies for storytelling, which creates a sense of belonging to a cultural group. To outsiders hearing an ethnic group's stories, it provides an introspection and insight into the beliefs, views, and customs of the community. For people within the community, it allows them to encompass their group's uniqueness. They show the human desires and fears of a group, such as love, marriage, and death. Folktales are also seen as a tool for education and entertainment. Folklore provides the wisdom to understand certain moments from different perspectives and it also showcases that all of our problems and successes happen in every culture and throughout different periods of history. They provide a way for children to understand the material and social environment. Every story has a moral to teach people, such as goodwill prevail over evil. For entertainment, stories are set in fantastic, non-human worlds. Often, the main character of the story would be a talking animal, or something unnatural would happen to a human character. Even though folktales are for entertainment, they bring a sense of belonging and pride to communities in Africa.

There are different types of African stories: animal tales and day-to-day tales. Animal tales are more oriented towards entertainment but still have morals and lessons to them. Animal tales are normally divided into trickster tales and ogre tales. In animal tales, a certain animal would always have the same character or role in each story, so the audience does not have to worry about characterization. The popular roles for some animals are as follows; The Hare was always the trickster, clever and cunning, while the Hyena was always tricked by the Hare. Ogres are always cruel, greedy monsters. The messengers in all the stories were the Birds. Day-to-Day tales are the most serious tales, never including humor, that explained the everyday life and struggles of an African community. These tales take on famine, escape from death, courtship, and family matters, using a song form when the climax of the story was being told.

African stories all have a certain structure to them. Villagers would gather around a common meeting place at the end of the day to listen and tell their stories. Storytellers had certain commands to start and end the stories, "Ugai Itha" to get the audience's attention and begin the story, and "Rukirika" to signal the end of a tale. Each scene of a story is depicted with two characters at a time, so the audience does not get overwhelmed. In each story, victims can overcome their predators and take justice out on the culprit. Certain tools were used in African folktales. For example, idiophones, such as drums, were used to make the sounds of different animals. Repetition and call-back techniques in prose or poem were also used to get the audience involved in the stories.

== Clothes ==
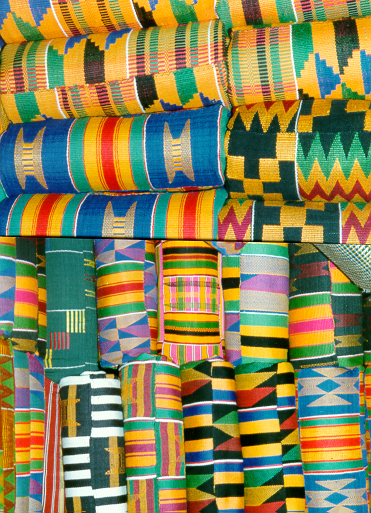
Ashanti Kente cloth patterns

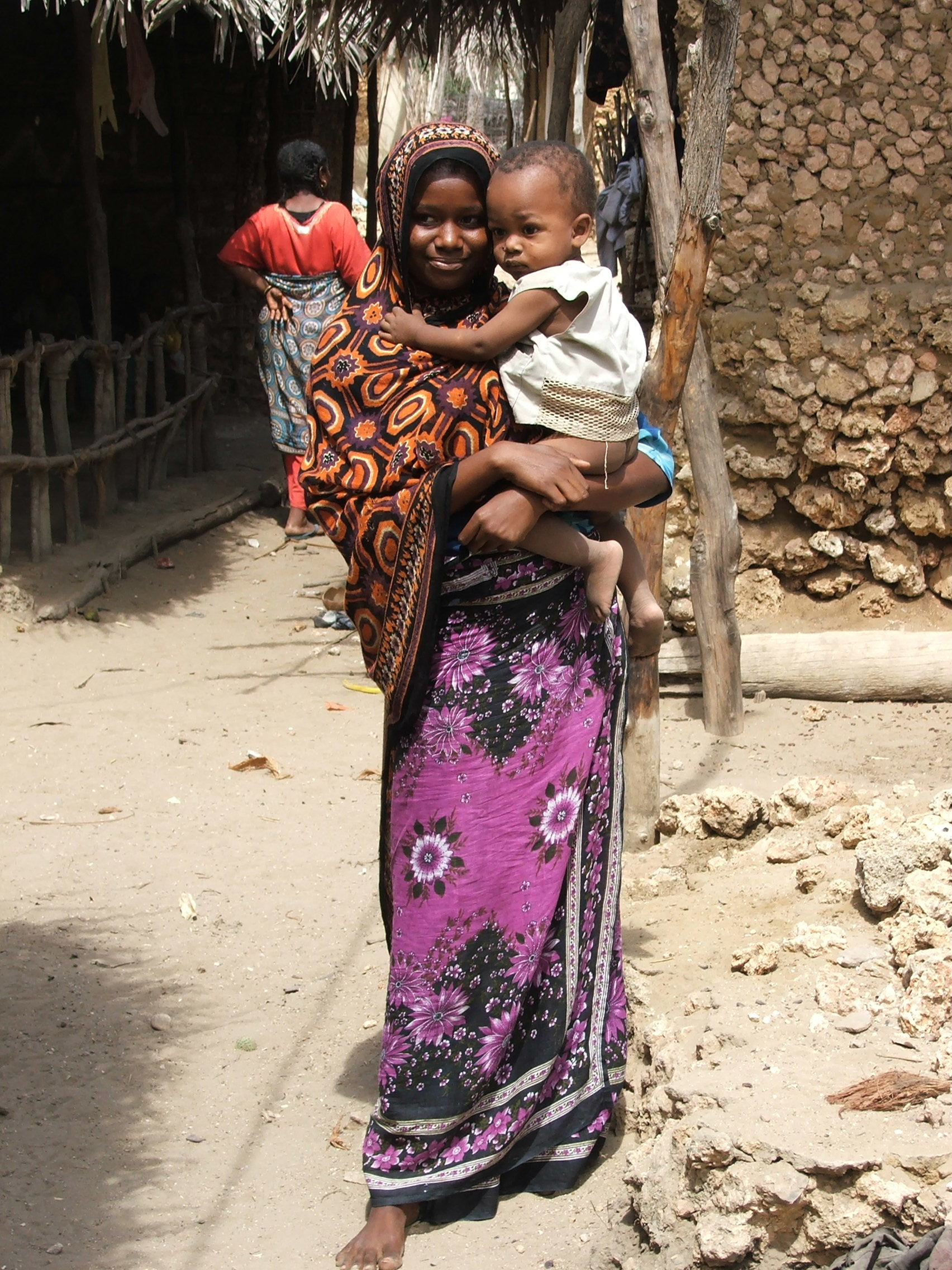
A woman in Kenya wearing kanga

Women's traditional clothes in Ethiopia are made from cloth called schema and are used to make habesha kemis. This all white outfit can be said to be the national costume for the Ethiopian as a result of it being commonly accepted and it's wild spread use but there exists much more variations to this outfit for example the Oromo people of Bale wear more of a leather garment and the Afaris wear brightly colored wraps made of cotton. The latter garment (habesha kemis) is basically cotton cloth, about 90 cm wide, woven in long strips which are then sewn together. Sometimes shiny threads are woven into the fabric for an elegant effect. Men wear pants and a knee-length shirt with a white collar, and perhaps a sweater. Men often wear knee-high socks, while women might not wear socks at all. Men, as well as women, wear shawls, the netela.

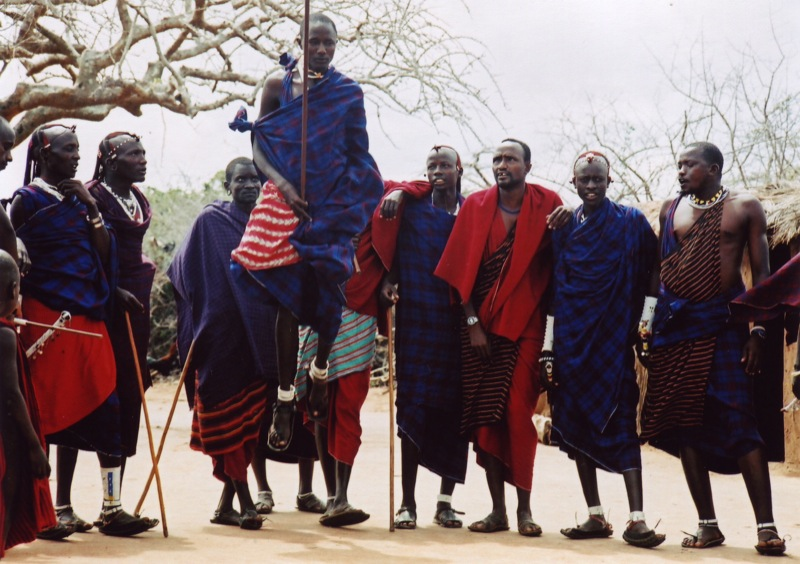
Maasai wearing traditional clothes named Matavuvale while performing Adumu, a traditional dance

Zulus wear a variety of attire, both traditional for ceremonial or culturally celebratory occasions. Traditional male clothing is usually light, consisting of a two-part apron (similar to a loincloth) used to cover the genitals and buttocks. The front piece is called the umutsha (pronounced Zulu pronunciation: [umtifash]) and is usually made of springbok or other animal hide twisted into different bands which cover the genitals. The rear piece, called the Ibheshu [ibeːʃu], is made of a single piece of springbok or cattle hide, and its length is usually used as an indicator of age and social position; longer amabheshu (plural of ibheshu) are worn by older men. Married men will usually also wear a headband, called the umqhele [umǃʰɛle], which is usually also made of springbok hide, or leopard hide by men of higher social status, such as chiefs. Zulu men will also wear cow tails as bracelets and anklets called imishokobezi [imiʃoɠoɓɛːzi] during ceremonies and rituals, such as weddings or dances.

In the Muslim parts of Africa, daily attire also often reflects Islamic tradition. The traditional attire for the Muslim men usually covers a minimum of the head and the range between the waist of the man and the knees, while the dress code for the islamic women is made to conceal and cover the hair and the body from the neck down to the ankles. There are some Muslim women who also conceal their face. Nevertheless, there are some Muslims that believe that the Quran does not command that women should wear a hijab or a burqa.

== Cuisine ==
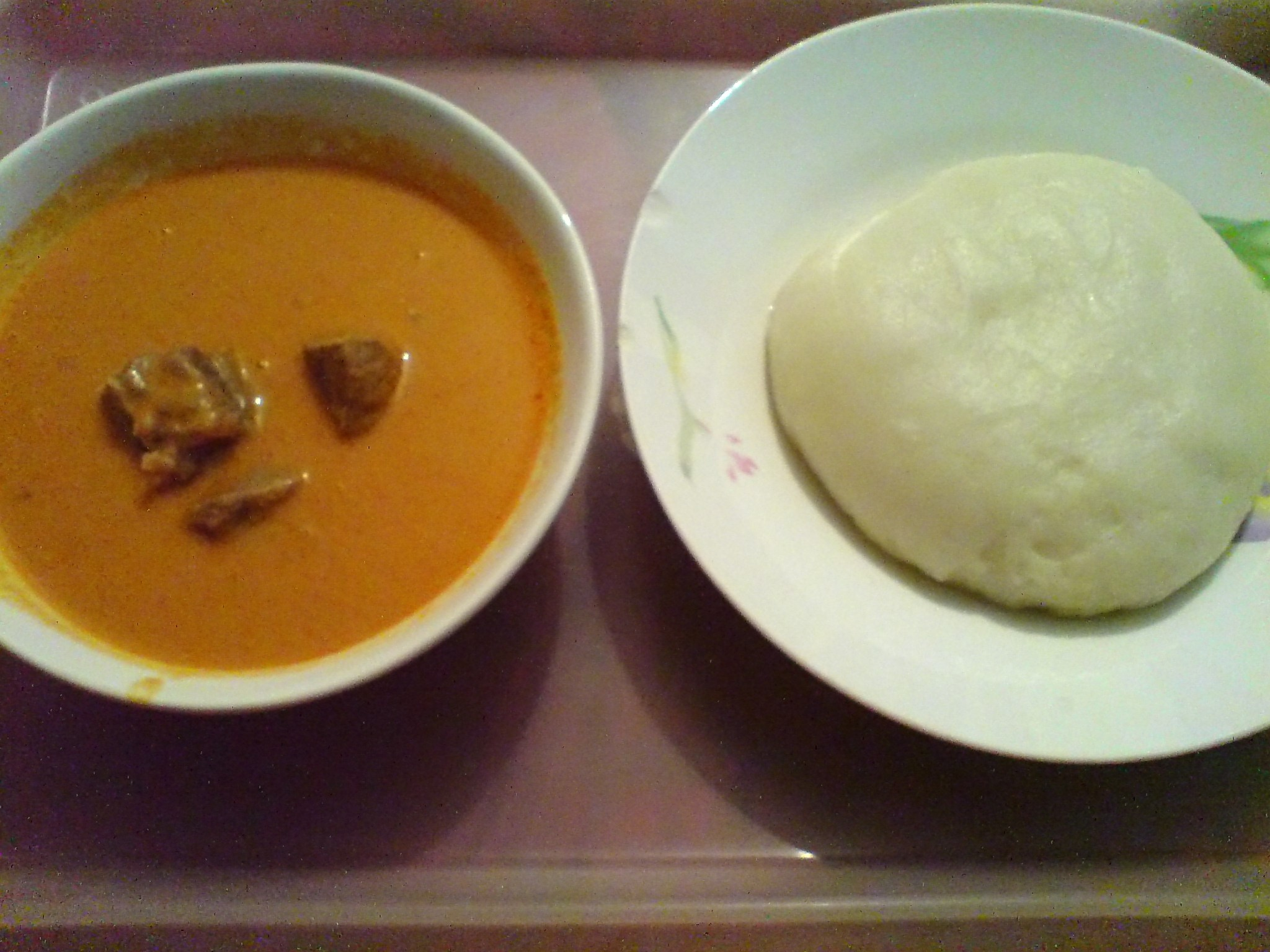
Fufu (right) is a staple meal in West Africa and Central Africa. It is usually served with some peanut soup.

The various cuisines of Africa use a combination of locally available fruits, cereal grains and vegetables, as well as milk and meat products. In some parts of the continent, the traditional diet features a preponderance of milk, curd and whey products. In much of tropical Africa, however, cow's milk is rare and cannot be produced locally (owing to various diseases that affect livestock). The continent's diverse demographic makeup is reflected in the many different eating and drinking habits, dishes, and preparation techniques of its manifold populations. However it is important to consider the affordability of and access of these products on daily basis.

In Central Africa, the basic ingredients are plantains and cassava. Fufu-starchy foods (usually made from fermented cassava roots) are served with grilled meat and sauces. Many local ingredients are used while preparing other dishes like spinach stew, cooked with tomato, peppers, chillis, onions, and peanut butter. Cassava plants are also consumed as cooked greens. Groundnut (peanut) stew is also prepared, containing chicken, okra, ginger, and other spices. Another favorite is Bambara, a porridge of rice, peanut butter, and sugar. Beef and chicken are favorite meat dishes, but game meat preparations containing crocodile, monkey, antelope and warthog are also served occasionally.

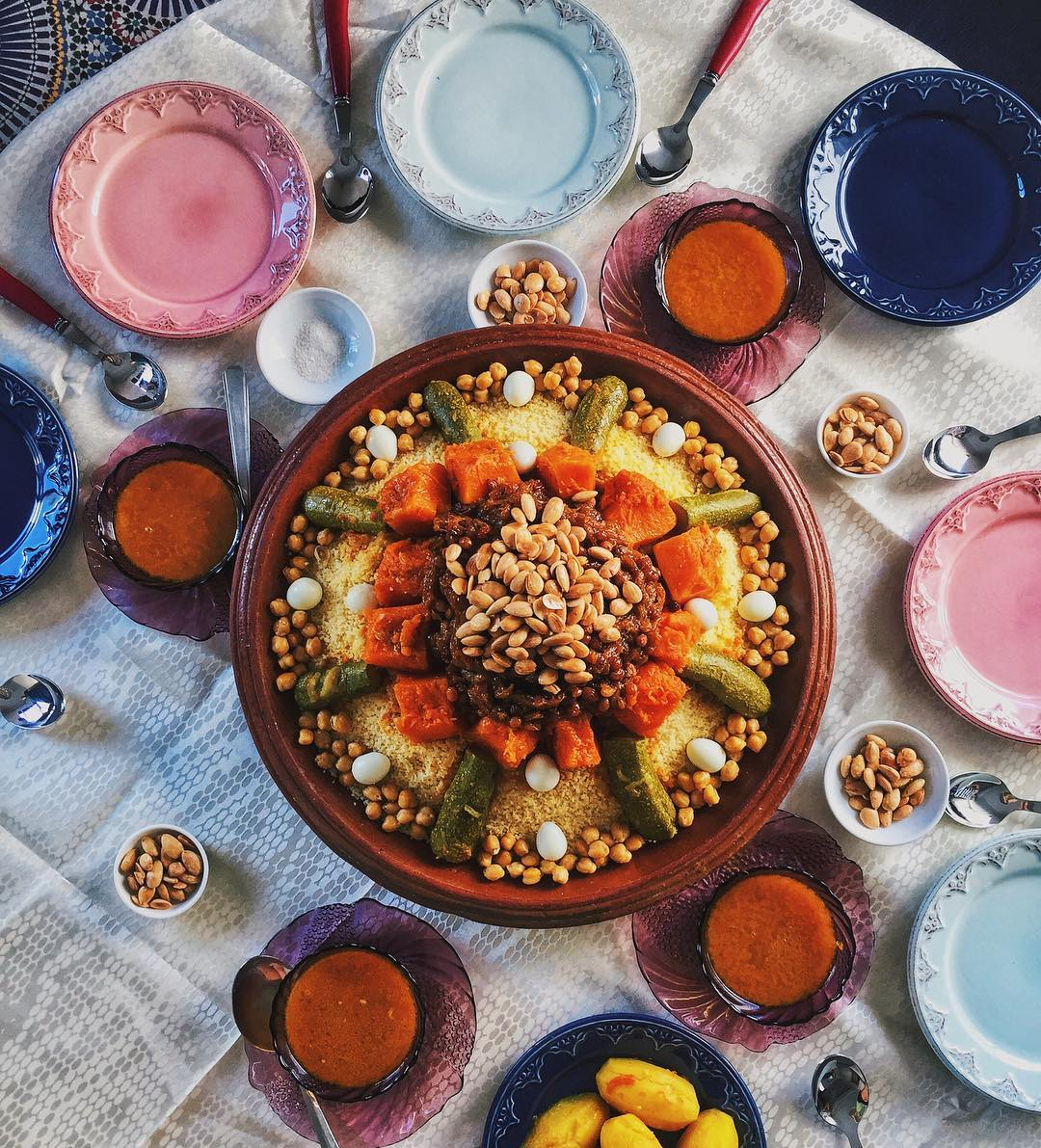
Fresh Moroccan couscous with vegetables and chickpeas

The cuisine of the African Great Lakes region varies from area to area. In the inland savannah, the traditional cuisine of cattle-keeping people is distinctive in that meat products are generally absent. Cattle, sheep and goats were regarded as a form of currency and a store of wealth and are not generally consumed as food. In some areas, traditional people consume the milk and blood of cattle, but rarely the meat. Elsewhere, other peoples are farmers who grow a variety of grains and vegetables. Maize (corn) is the basis of ugali, the East African version of West Africa's fufu. Ugali is a starch dish eaten with meats or stews. In Uganda, steamed, green bananas called matoke provide the starch filler of many meals.

In the Horn of Africa, the main traditional dishes in Ethiopian cuisine and Eritrean cuisine are tsebhis (stews) served with injera (flatbread made from teff, wheat, or sorghum), and hilbet (paste made from legumes, mainly lentil, faba beans). Eritrean and Ethiopian cuisine (especially in the northern half) are very similar, given the shared history of the two countries. The related Somali cuisine consists of an exotic fusion of diverse culinary influences. Varieties of bariis (rice), the most popular probably being basmati, usually serve as the main dish. Xalwo (halwo) or halva is a popular confection served during special occasions such as Eid celebrations or wedding receptions. After meals, homes are traditionally perfumed using frankincense (lubaan) or incense (cuunsi), which is prepared inside an incense burner referred to as a dabqaad. All food is served halal.

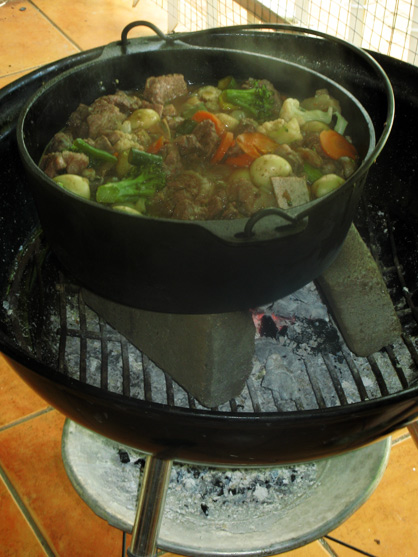
Potjiekos is a traditional Afrikaner stew made with meat and vegetables and cooked over coals in cast-iron pots.

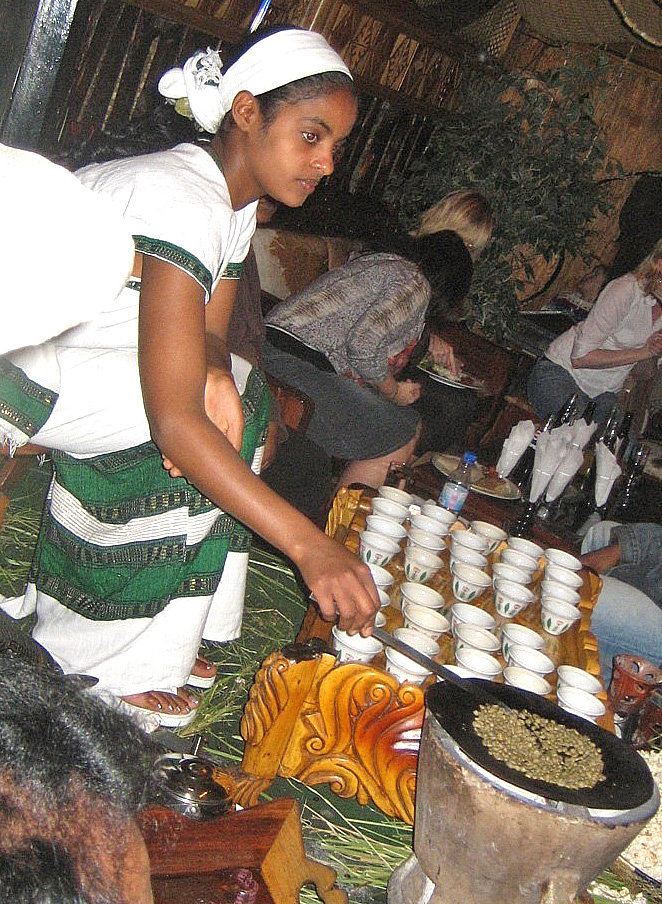
An Ethiopian woman preparing Ethiopian coffee at a traditional ceremony. She roasts, crushes, and brews the coffee on the spot.

The roots of North African cuisine can be traced back to the ancient empires of North Africa, particularly in Egypt, where many of the country's dishes and culinary traditions date back to ancient Egypt. Over several centuries traders, travelers, invaders, migrants and immigrants all have influenced the cuisine of North Africa. Most of the North African countries today have several similar dishes, sometimes almost the same dish with a different name (the Moroccan tangia and the Tunisian coach are both essentially the same dish: a meat stew prepared in an urn and cooked overnight in a public oven), sometimes with a slight change in ingredients and cooking style. To add to the confusion, two completely different dishes may also share the same name (for example, a "tajine" dish is a slow-cooked stew in Morocco, whereas the Tunisian "tajine" is a baked omelet/quiche-like dish). There are noticeable differences between the cooking styles of different nations – there's the sophisticated, full-bodied flavours of Moroccan palace cookery, the fiery dishes of Tunisian cuisine, and the humbler, simpler cuisines of Egypt and Algeria.

The cooking of Southern Africa is sometimes called 'rainbow cuisine', as the food in this region is a blend of many culinary traditions, including those of the Khoisan, Bantu, European and Asian populations. Basic ingredients include seafood, meat products (including wild game), poultry, as well as grains, fresh fruits and vegetables. Fruits include apples, grapes, mangoes, bananas and papayas, avocado, oranges, peaches and apricots. Desserts may simply be fruit. However, there are some more western style puddings, such as the Angolan Cocada amarela, which was inspired by Portuguese cuisine. Meat products include lamb, as well as game like venison, ostrich, and impala. The seafood includes a wide variety such as crayfish, prawns, tuna, mussels, oysters, calamari, mackerel, and lobster. There are also several types of traditional and modern alcoholic beverages including many European-style beers.

A typical West African meal is heavy with starchy items, meat, spices, and flavors. A wide array of staples are eaten across the region, including those of Fufu, Banku and Kenkey (originating from Ghana), Foutou, Couscous, Tô, and Garri, which are served alongside soups and stews. Fufu is often made from starchy root vegetables such as yams, cocoyams, or cassava, but also from cereal grains like millet, sorghum or plantains. The staple grain or starch varies from region to region and ethnic group to ethnic group. However, corn has gained significant ground as it is cheap, swells to greater volumes and creates a beautiful white final product that is greatly desired. Banku and Kenkey are maize dough staples, and Garri is made from dried grated cassavas. Rice dishes are also widely eaten in the region, especially in the dry Sahel belt inland. Examples of these include Benachin from The Gambia and Jollof rice, a pan-West African rice dish similar to Arab kabsah.

== Music ==
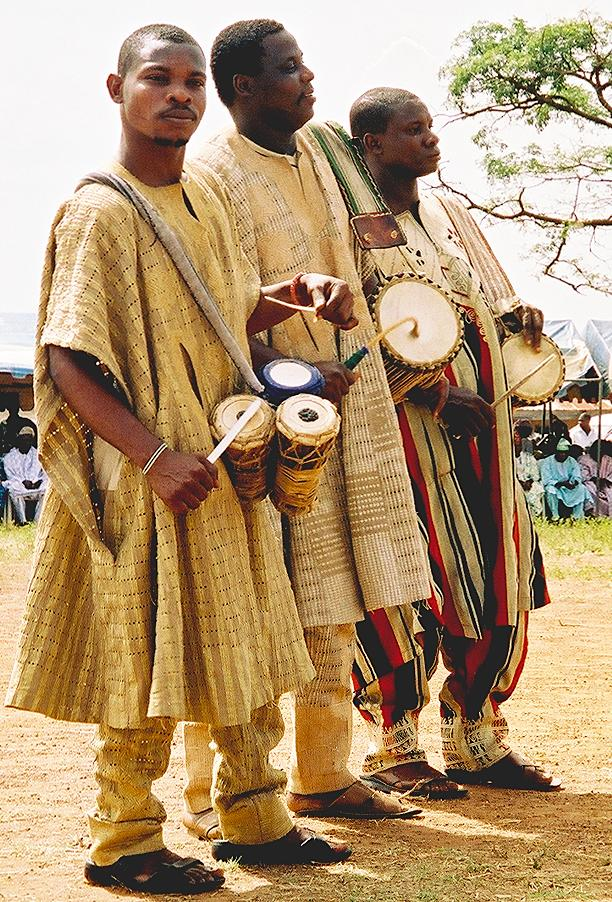
Yoruba drummers at celebration in Ojumo Oro, Kwara State, Nigeria

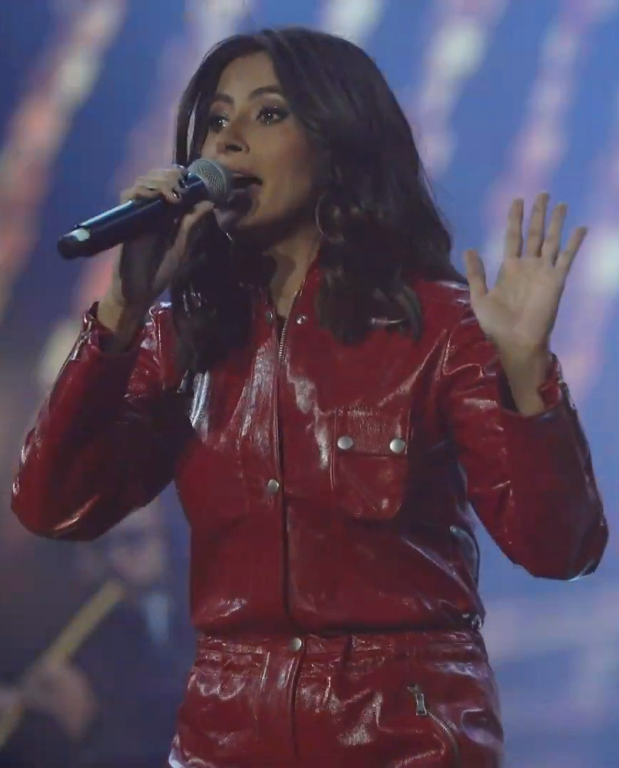
Ruby, Egyptian singer performing

Traditional Sub-Saharan African music is as diverse as the region's various populations. The common perception of Sub-Saharan African music is that it is rhythmic music centered on the drums, and indeed, a large part of Sub-Saharan music, mainly among speakers of Niger–Congo and Nilo-Saharan languages, is rhythmic and centered on the drum. Sub-Saharan music is polyrhythmic, usually consisting of multiple rhythms in one composition such as the Serer of Senegambia's ultra-religious njuup tradition (the progenitor of mbalax). Dance involves moving multiple body parts. These aspects of Sub-Saharan music were transferred to the new world by enslaved West Africans and can be seen in its influence on music forms as Samba, Jazz, Rhythm and Blues, Rock & Roll, Salsa, and Rap music.

Other African musical traditions also involve strings, horns, and very few poly-rhythms. Music from the eastern Sahel and along the Nile, among the Nilo-Saharan, made extensive use of strings and horns in ancient times. Dancing involves swaying body movements and footwork. Among the Khoisans extensive use of string instruments with emphasis on footwork.

Modern Sub-Saharan African music has been influenced by music from the New World (Jazz, Salsa, Rhythm and Blues etc.). Popular styles include Mbalax in Senegal and Gambia, Highlife in Ghana, Zoblazo in Côte d'Ivoire, Makossa in Cameroon, Soukous in the Democratic Republic of Congo, Kizomba in Angola, and Xhosa music in South Africa. New World styles like Salsa, R&B/Rap, Reggae, and Zouk also have widespread popularity.

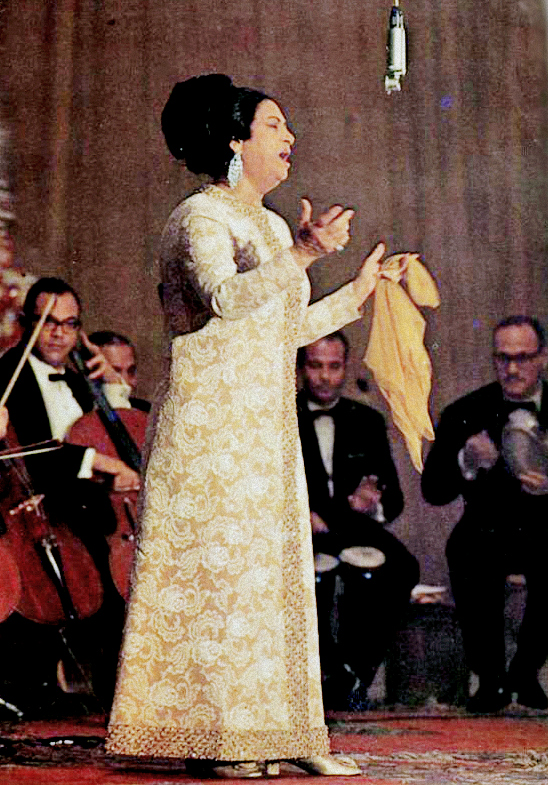
Egyptian singer Umm Kulthum, one of the most iconic singers in African history

Like the musical genres of the Nile Valley and the Horn of Africa, North African music has close ties with Middle Eastern music and utilizes similar melodic modes (maqamat). It has a considerable range, from the music of ancient Egypt to the Berber and the Tuareg music of the desert nomads. The region's art music has for centuries followed the outline of Arabic and Andalusian classical music. Its popular contemporary genres include the Algerian Raï. Somali music is typically pentatonic, using five pitches per octave in contrast to a heptatonic (seven note) scale such as the major scale. In Ethiopia, the Amhara music of the highlands uses a fundamental modal system called qenet, of which there are four main modes: tezeta, bati, ambassel, and anchihoy. Three additional modes are variations on the above: tezeta minor, bati major, and bati minor. Some songs take the name of their qenet, such as tizita, a song of reminiscence.

== Languages ==
Africa is home to approximately one-third of the world's languages, anywhere between 1000 and 2000 languages. The main ethnolinguistic divisions in Africa are Afro-Asiatic (approximately 200 languages) covering nearly Northern Africa (including the horn of Africa, Central Sahara et the top Nile), Niger–Congo with approximately 1,350 - 1,650 languages is the largest of the four; it is also the largest language family in the world. The Niger-Congo languages inhabit Western, Central, Eastern and Southern Africa this includes the Bantu language. Nilo-Saharan in parts of the Sahara and the Sahel and parts of Eastern Africa, and Khoisan (indigenous minorities of Southern Africa). Nilo-Saharan gathers approximately 140 languages with some eleven million speakers scattered in Central and Eastern Africa. Last but not least is the Khoisan family with between 40 - 70 members. Believed to be the oldest of the four language families, it is the smallest of the four and is found mainly in Southern Africa.

The continent of Africa speaks hundreds of languages, and if dialects spoken by various ethnic groups are also included, the number is much higher. These languages and dialects do not have the same importance: some are spoken by only a few hundred people, others are spoken by millions. The most widely spoken languages of Africa, Swahili (100 million), Hausa (38 million), Yoruba (20 million), Amharic (20 million), Igbo (21 million), and Fula (13 million), belong mostly to the Niger-Congo family. Very few countries of Africa use any single language, and for this reason, several official languages coexist, African and European. Some Africans speak various European languages such as English, Spanish, French, Portuguese, Italian, German and Dutch. The official languages of the African Union and all its institutions shall be Arabic, English, French, Portuguese, Spanish, Kiswahili and any other African language.

== Sport ==
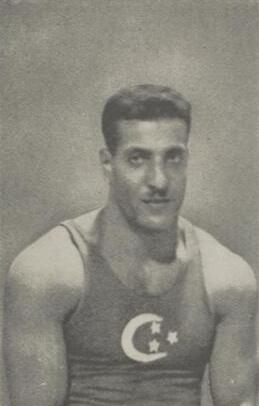
Egyptian weightlifter El-Sayed Nosseir, winner of the gold medal in the light heavyweight class at the 1928 Summer Olympics in Amsterdam. He is the first Egyptian to win an Olympic gold medal in the history of the Olympic Games.

Sports in Africa is organized, with many sports having professional leagues. Association football (also known as soccer) is the most popular sport in almost all African countries. Some East African nations, such as Kenya and Ethiopia, are very dominant at long-distance running, whilst North African countries such as Algeria, Egypt, Morocco and Tunisia are dominant in handball. Rugby union and golf are reasonably popular in a few African countries, though rugby union is very popular in South Africa.

Traditional sports were strictly marginalised during the colonial era, and many are dying or have gone extinct under the pressure of modernisation, however lots remain popular despite not having formal governmental recognition or support. In 2010, South Africa became the first African nation to host the FIFA World Cup.

== African diaspora ==
African cultures have had profound influences on the rest of the world through West African cultural traditions that were brought to the Americas and the Caribbean during the Trans-Atlantic Slave Trade, as well as later immigration of people from throughout Africa.

African cultures, which originated on the continent of Africa, have several distinct differences than that of Black culture, which originated by African Americans in the United States after they were stripped of most of their own African cultures during enslavement. Some differences are that African cultures retain tribal affairs to only be worn during specific events, hand carvings, tribal masks and dances whereas Black culture is ethnic to African Americans such as hip hop, jazz, hamboning and soul food. Though some Africanisms were retained in Black culture of the United States, most of Black American culture and history was created by Black Americans. The same retained Africanisms and also created cultural differences and can be noticed and noted in Caribbean cultures from the descendants of the enslaved as well as in black South American cultures, such as culturally different expressions, foods, styles and languages due to the centuries separation and enslavement away from the African continent, being formed uniquely in places like Bahia, Brazil.

== See also ==
- African philosophy
- Africana philosophy
- African divination
- History of Africa
- Sub-Saharan Africa
- Culture of Asia
- Culture of Europe
- Culture of North America
- Culture of Oceania
- Culture of South America
- National African Immigrant Heritage Month
