= Chugunov =

Chugunov may refer to

- Chugunov (surname)
- Chugunov Island in Antarctica
- Chugunov Glacier in Antarctica
