= Potbrood =

Bread made by Boer settlers (South Africa)

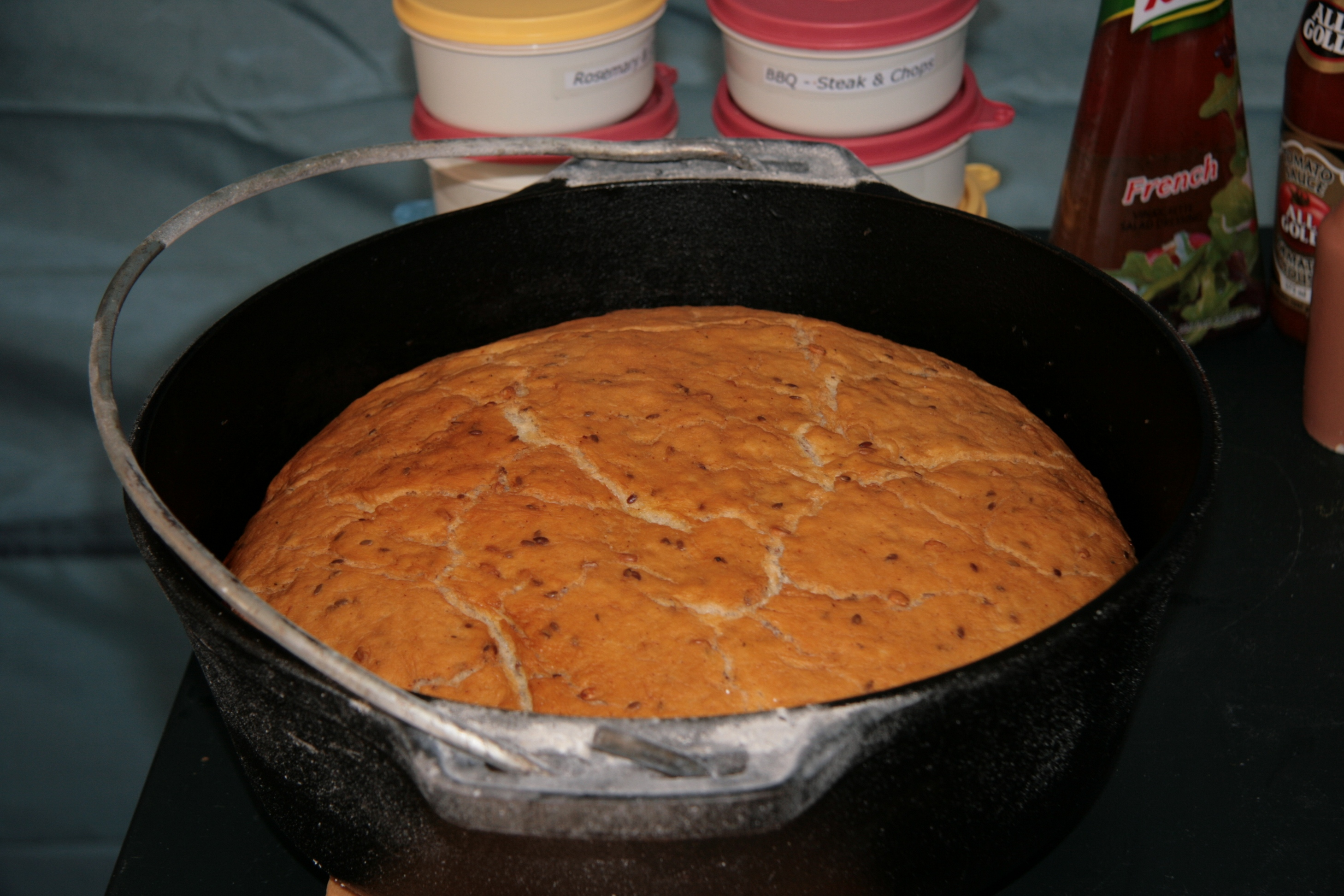
- Potbrood in the pot
- Type: Bread
- Place of origin: South Africa

Potbrood ("pot bread") is bread first made by the Boer settlers of what is now South Africa. Potbrood was traditionally baked in a cast-iron pot (also known as a Dutch oven) in a pit made in the ground and lined with hot coals.

Potbrood is often made at a braai (barbecue) by packing charcoal or wood coals around a cooking pot.

== See also ==
- Potjiekos
- List of African dishes
