= Chugun (pot) =

Cast-iron crock

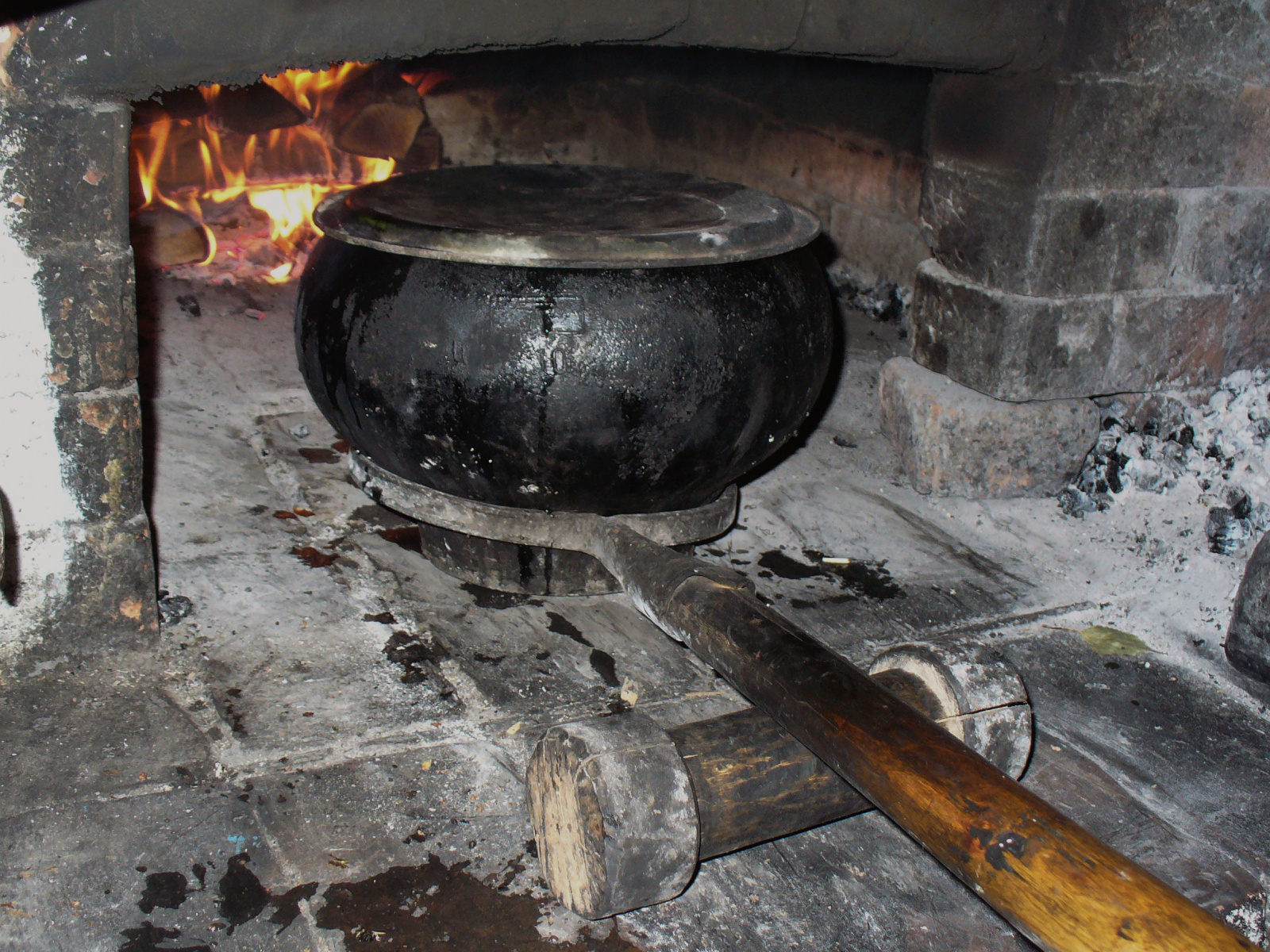
Handling a chugun with an ukhvat

Chugun (Russian: чугун, Russian pronunciation: [tɕʊˈɡun]; small one: chugunok (Russian: чугунок, Russian pronunciation: [t͡ɕʊɡʊˈnok])) is a crock initially made of cast iron, hence its name: "chugun" in Russian means "cast iron". It has a special shape: narrow at the bottom quickly turning into a round bowl, that permits handling of it in the Russian stove with a special implement called ukhvat, a long wooden handle ending with the two-pronged metal "grabber". Later chuguns were made of aluminium as well. This kind of ware had become widespread in Russia since the break of the 19th and 20th centuries.

Standalone small stoves had special metal rings to fit bottoms of chuguns of different sizes.

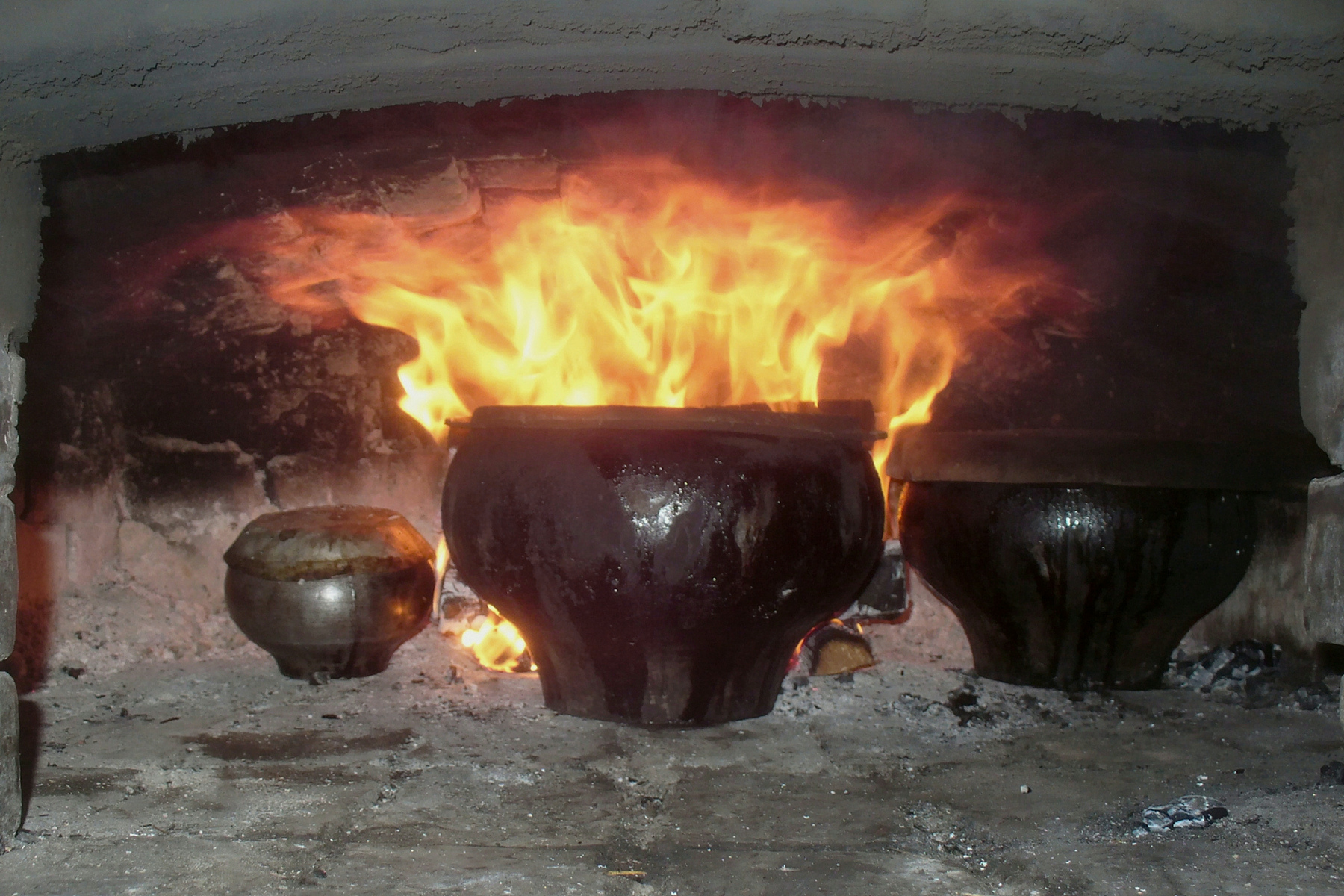
A variety of chuguns and chugunoks are used to prepare an entire meal

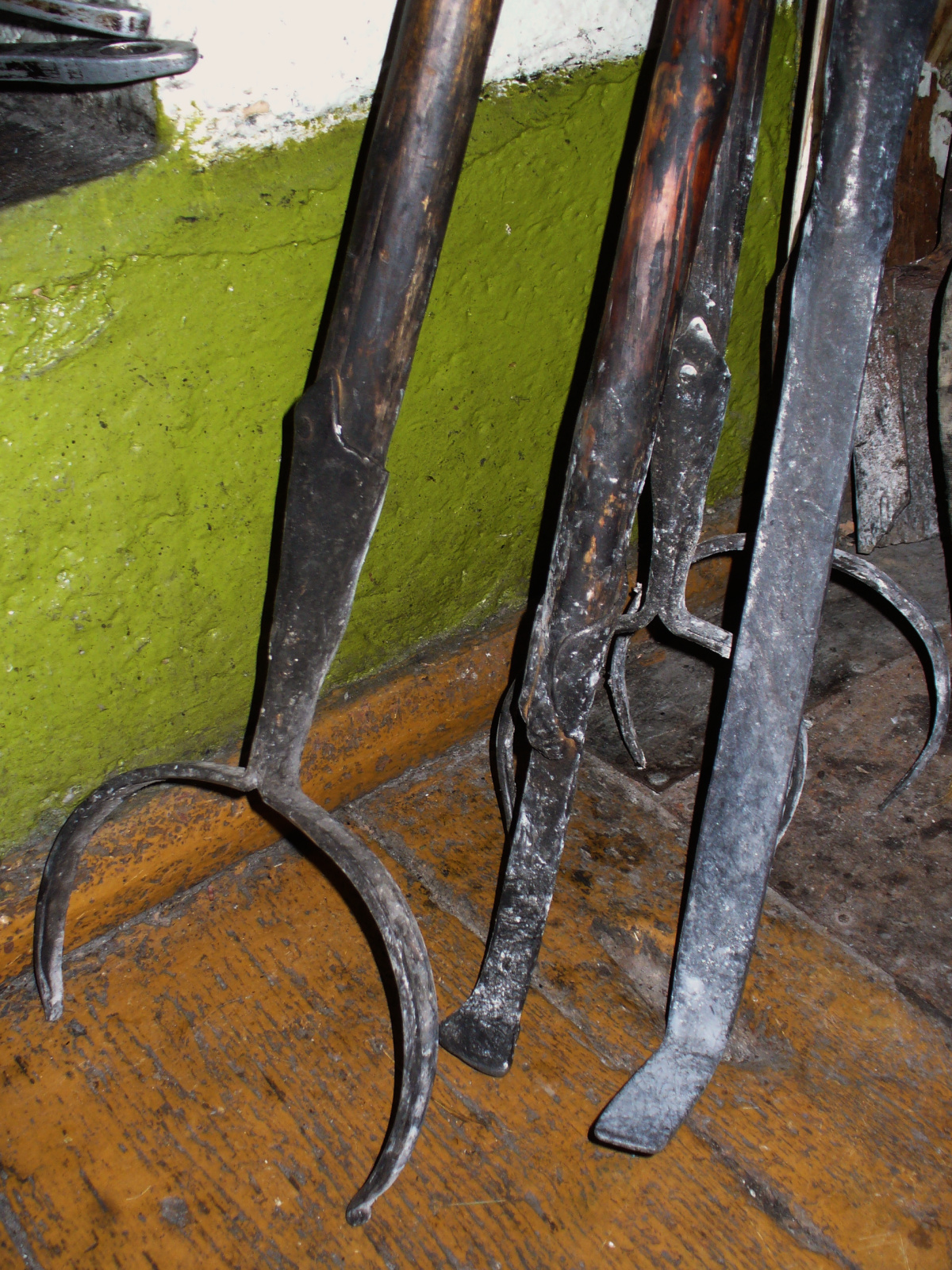
Ukhvats of varying sizes, fire iron, and chapelnik (to handle pans)

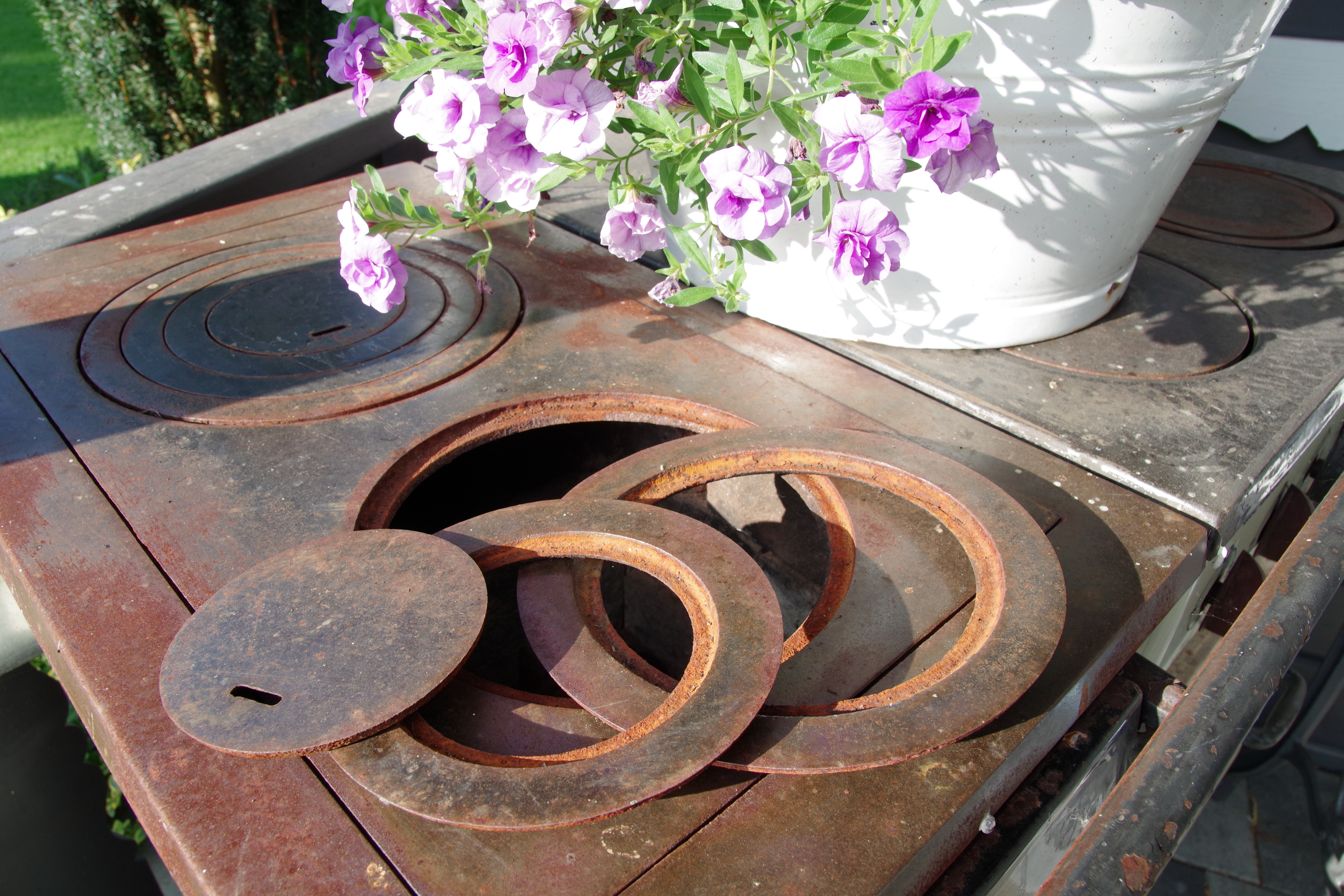
A stovetop with iron fitting rings

The implement gave rise to Russian surnames Chugunov and Chugunkov.

== See also ==
- Dutch oven
- Kazan (cookware)
