= Sač =

Bell-shaped lid used like an oven in the Balkans

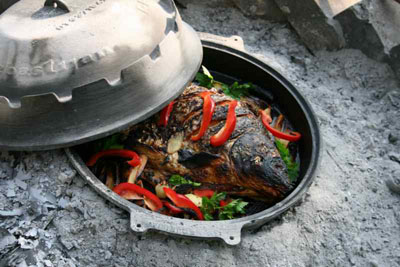
A carp cooked in a sač

A sač (Cyrillic: Сач; Croatian: peka) is a large metal or ceramic lid like a shallow bell with which bread dough or various dishes to be baked are covered, and over which ashes and live coals are placed. Dishes prepared in a sač are evenly cooked, retain their juiciness, and are praised for their rich flavour.

Sač can also refer to a dish made of meat, vegetables and potatoes and baked in a sač oven.

== Origin ==
The bell itself probably comes from the saj, a curved metal utensil used on its convex side for flatbread baking, and with the concave side employed similarly to a wok in the Middle East and large parts of Asia.

== History ==
Traditionally, the sač was a simple, primitive oven for baking various foods used by less well-off families who could not afford a stove in their homes, and the lid itself often doubled as a plate for flatbread baking.

Today, the baking appliance is commonly used by restaurants all over Turkey and the Balkan Peninsula –Albania, Bulgaria, Bosnia and Herzegovina, Croatia (where it is called "peka"), Greece (where it is called "Παραδοσιακή Γάστρα", "Σινί" or "Χάνι"), Kosovo, Montenegro, North Macedonia, Serbia, and Slovenia.

== Use and characteristics ==
Cooking in the sač enables even convection baking, and the bell shape allows the steam to recirculate, allowing the meat, fish and vegetables to remain juicy, and the potatoes and other vegetables to intermix their flavours with that of the meat. It is also used for baking bread and traditional pastries like burek and pizza. This traditional style of cooking has been adopted mostly because of its specific flavour-enhancing properties, which enable the food to be lightly smoked during the convection cooking process.

== Regional variants ==
In Bulgaria, the word сач (sach) or сачѐ (sachè) refers to a flat clay plate, which is heated to a high temperature, and placed on the table, where thin slices of vegetables and meat are cooked on it. Fat is not used, and it is not covered. In the region of the Rhodopes typically more meat is used.

In some regions of Romania, the equivalent of sač, called țest, a derivate of the Latin testum, was used for baking bread.

== Gallery ==
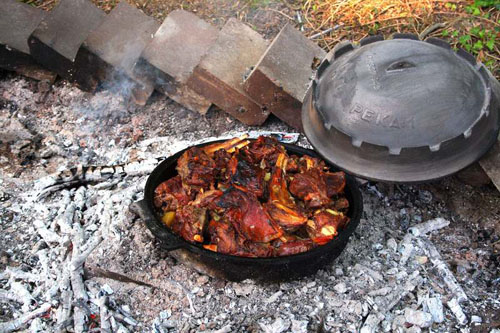
An example of cooking lamb in the sač

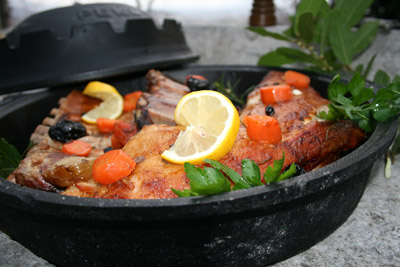

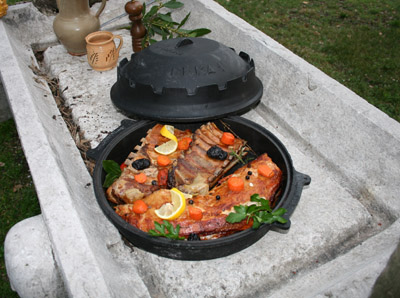

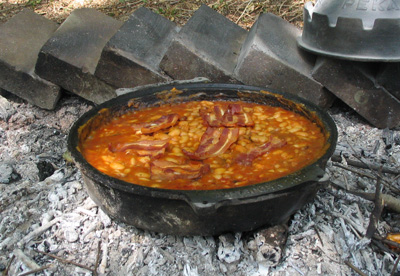

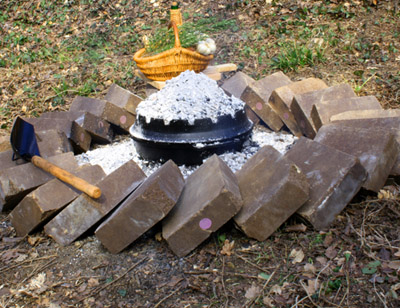

== See also ==
- Dutch oven
- Saj (utensil)
- Wok
