= Potjiekos =

South African stew

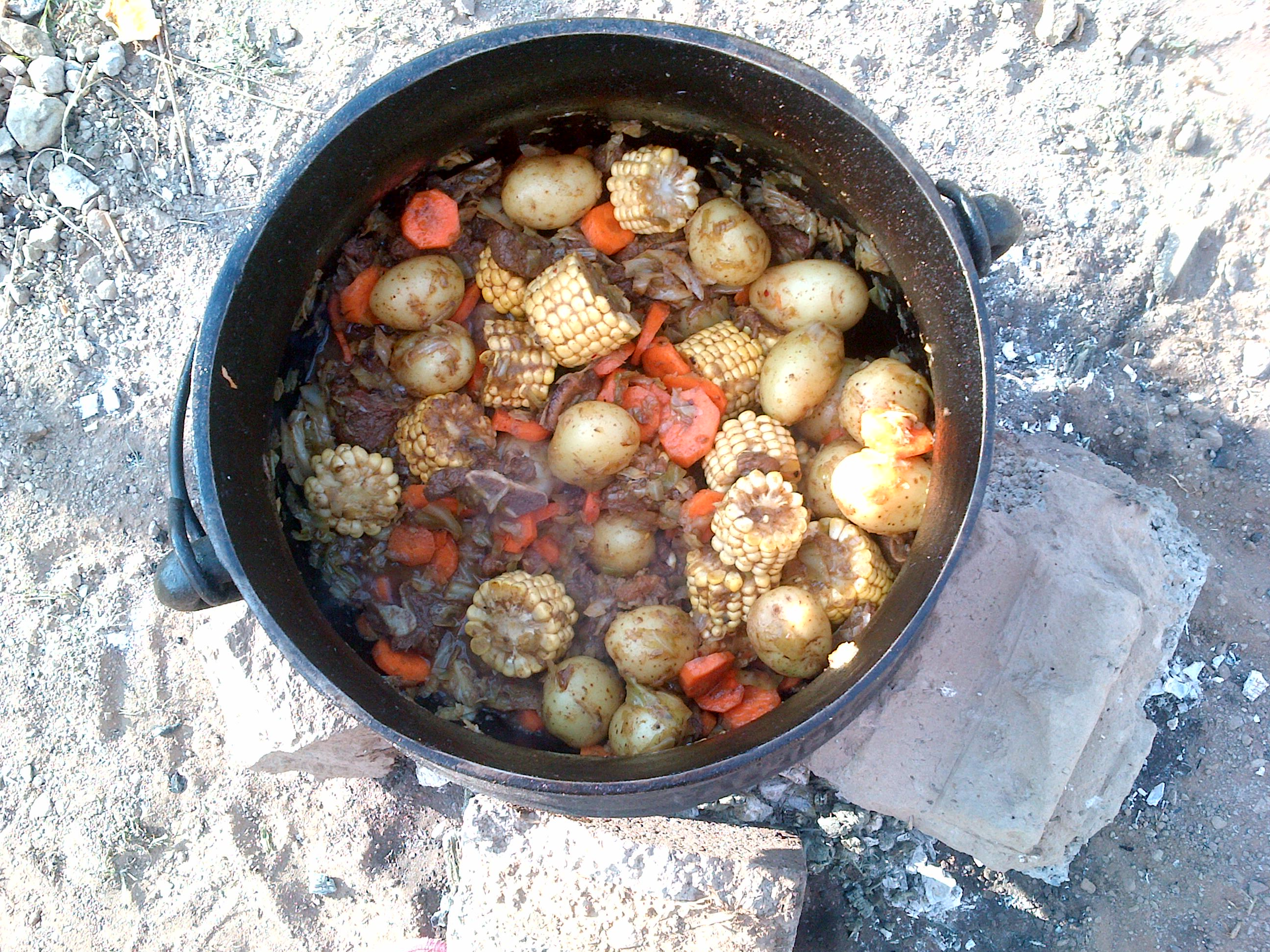
- Type: Stew
- Place of origin: South Africa
- Main ingredients: Meat, vegetables like cabbage, carrots, cauliflower, potatoes; beer or a dessert wine

In South Africa, a potjiekos /ˈpɔɪkiːkɒs/, literally translated "small-pot food", is a dish prepared outdoors. It is traditionally cooked in a round, cast iron, three-legged cauldron, the potjie. The pot is heated using small amounts of wood or charcoal or, if fuel is scarce, twisted grass or even dried animal dung.

== History ==
Traditionally, the recipe includes meat, vegetables like carrots, cabbage, cauliflower, or pumpkin, starches like rice or potatoes, all slow-cooked with Dutch-Malay spices, the distinctive spicing of South Africa's early culinary melting pot. Other common ingredients include fruits and flour-based products like pasta.

Potjiekos originated with the Voortrekkers, evolving as a stew made of venison and vegetables (if available), cooked in the potjie. As trekkers (pioneers) shot wild game, it was added to the pot. The large bones were included to thicken the dish. Each day when the wagons stopped, the pot was placed over a fire to simmer. New bones replaced old and fresh meat replaced meat eaten. Game included venison, poultry such as guinea fowl, warthog, bushpig, rabbit, and hare.

== Ingredients and general process ==
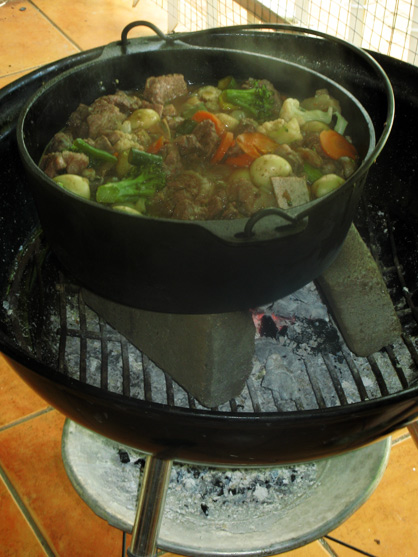
An improvised potjie

Cooking oil is added to a potjie, and placed on a fire until hot. Meat is added, typically lamb or pork. The meat is spiced and often a form of alcohol is added for flavor—mostly beer, Old Brown Sherry or a dessert wine like Humbro.

== Health hazards ==
In 1998, it was reported that illegally-imported aluminium potjie pots with large amounts of lead were being sold, placing users at risk of lead poisoning.

== See also ==
- Braai
- Skottle
- Hot pot
- List of African dishes
- List of stews
- Perpetual stew
- Potbrood
- Sač
