= Tiger bread =

Type of bread

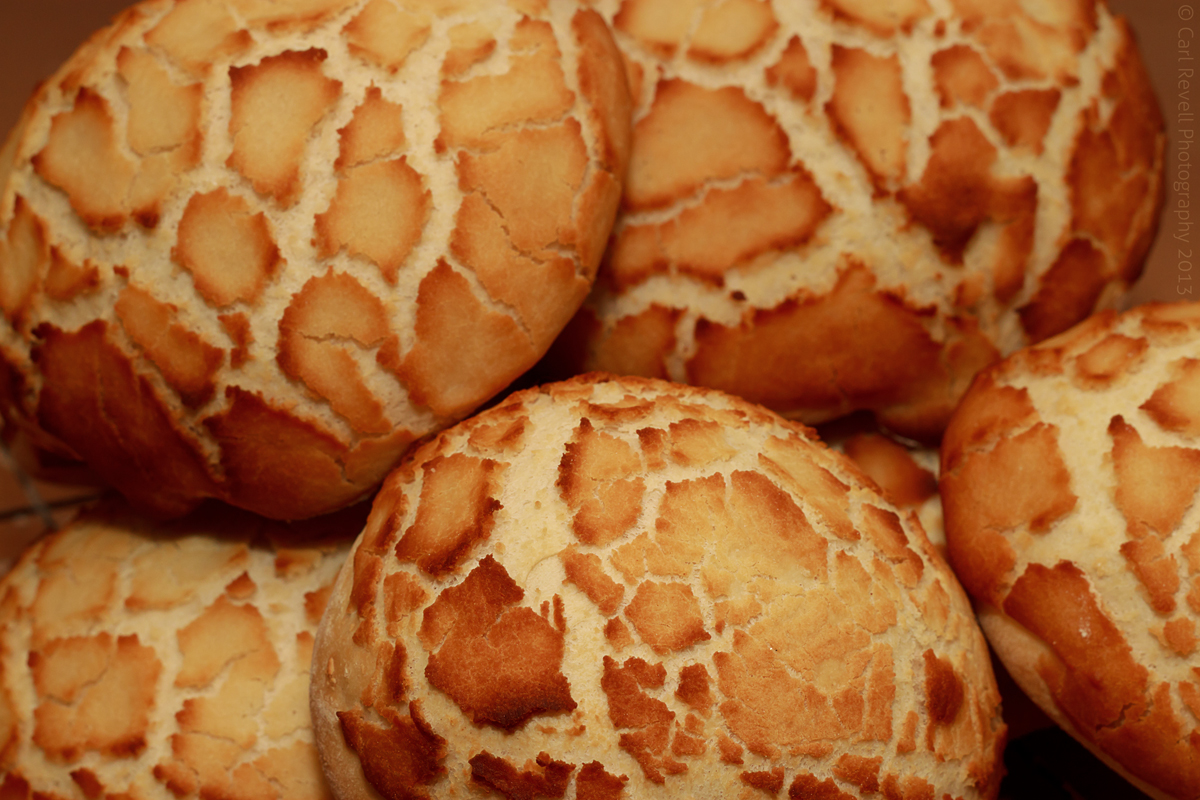
- Tiger bread rolls
- Type: Bread
- Place of origin: Netherlands
- Main ingredients: bread, Rice paste

Tiger bread (Dutch: Tijgerbrood), also known as Dutch crunch and under various brand names, is a bread of Dutch origin that has a mottled crust.

== Crust ==
The bread is generally made with a pattern baked onto the top made by painting rice paste onto the surface prior to baking. The rice paste that imparts the bread's characteristic flavor dries and cracks during the baking process. The bread itself has a crusty exterior, but is soft inside. Typically, tiger bread is made as a white bread bloomer loaf or bread roll, but the technique can be applied to any shape of bread.

== Other names ==
The bread originated in the Netherlands, where it is known as tijgerbrood or tijgerbol (tiger bun). The first published reference in the US to "Dutch crunch" bread was in 1935 in Oregon, according to food historian Erica J. Peters, where it appeared in a bakery advertisement. The US supermarket chain Wegmans sells it as "Marco Polo" bread. In the San Francisco Bay Area it is called Dutch Crunch.

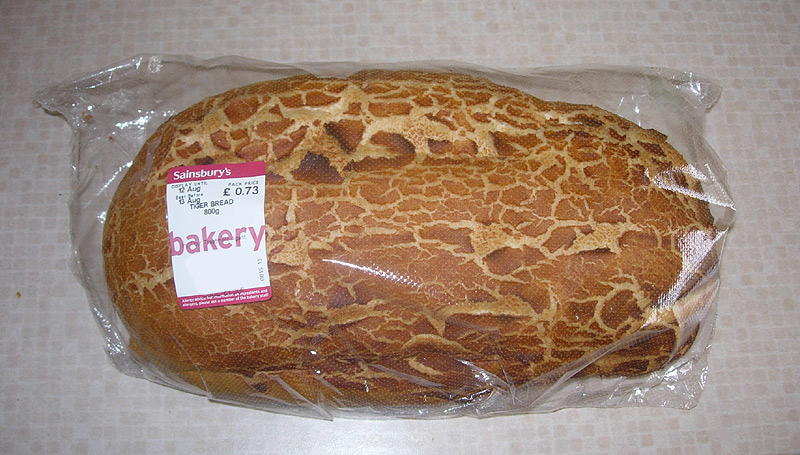
A tiger bread loaf

In January 2012, the UK supermarket chain Sainsbury's announced that it would market the product under the name "giraffe bread", after a three-year-old girl wrote to the company to suggest it, and the letter and reply gained traction on her mother's social media accounts.
