= Chugunov (surname) =

Chugunov (Russian: Чугунов, from чугун meaning cast iron or chugun, a kind of pot) is a Russian masculine surname, its feminine counterpart is Chugunova. It may refer to

- Chris Chugunov
- Dmitri Chugunov (born 1968), Russian football player
- Galina Chugunova (born 1980), Russian sprint canoer
- Gleb Chugunov
