= National African Immigrant Heritage Month =

H.Res.371 — 114th Congress (2009-2010) established National African Immigrant Heritage Month. to be celebrated during the month of September, recognizing the impact that African Immigrants in America play in the shaping of the country.

== Legislative history ==
H.R. 371 was introduced into United States House of Representatives by 25 co-sponsors. The resolution sought to express the sense of congress that September should be the month to celebrate Americans who are of African immigrant heritage in the United States. H.R. 371 showed the diversity of the African immigrant communities, from languages and culture, while also identifying that African immigrants need be classified more accurately and not as the ethnic group African Americans due to different needs as immigrants.

It was in 2015 that the House of Representatives passed and established National African Immigrant Heritage Month to be observed in September.

There is also a National Immigrant Heritage Month which is also celebrated in June.

== Celebrations ==
Since the passing of National African Immigrant Heritage Month, there have been celebrations in various states, emphasizing how those of African Immigrant Heritage have impacted society in the USA.
