= Plakali =

Ghanaian staple food

- Alternative names: Plakali
- Place of origin: Ghana, Côte d’Ivoire
- Region or state: Western Region
- Main ingredients: Usually cassava
- Variations: 2
Nutritional value
(per serving)
- Protein: {{{protein}}} g
- Fat: 0.1 g
- Carbohydrate: 84 g

Plakali is a staple food mainly prepared by the Ahanta and Nzema peoples of the Western region of Ghana and Akan people of Ivory Coast (Baoulé people, Aboure, Nzema, Anyi people). It consists of cassava dough cooked in hot water, and it is similar to banku, another Ivorian and Ghanaian staple food, and fufu. Plakali is eaten with palm nut or groundnut soup.

== See also ==
- Ground nut Soup
- Palm Nut Soup
