= Shito =

Ghanaian hot black pepper sauce

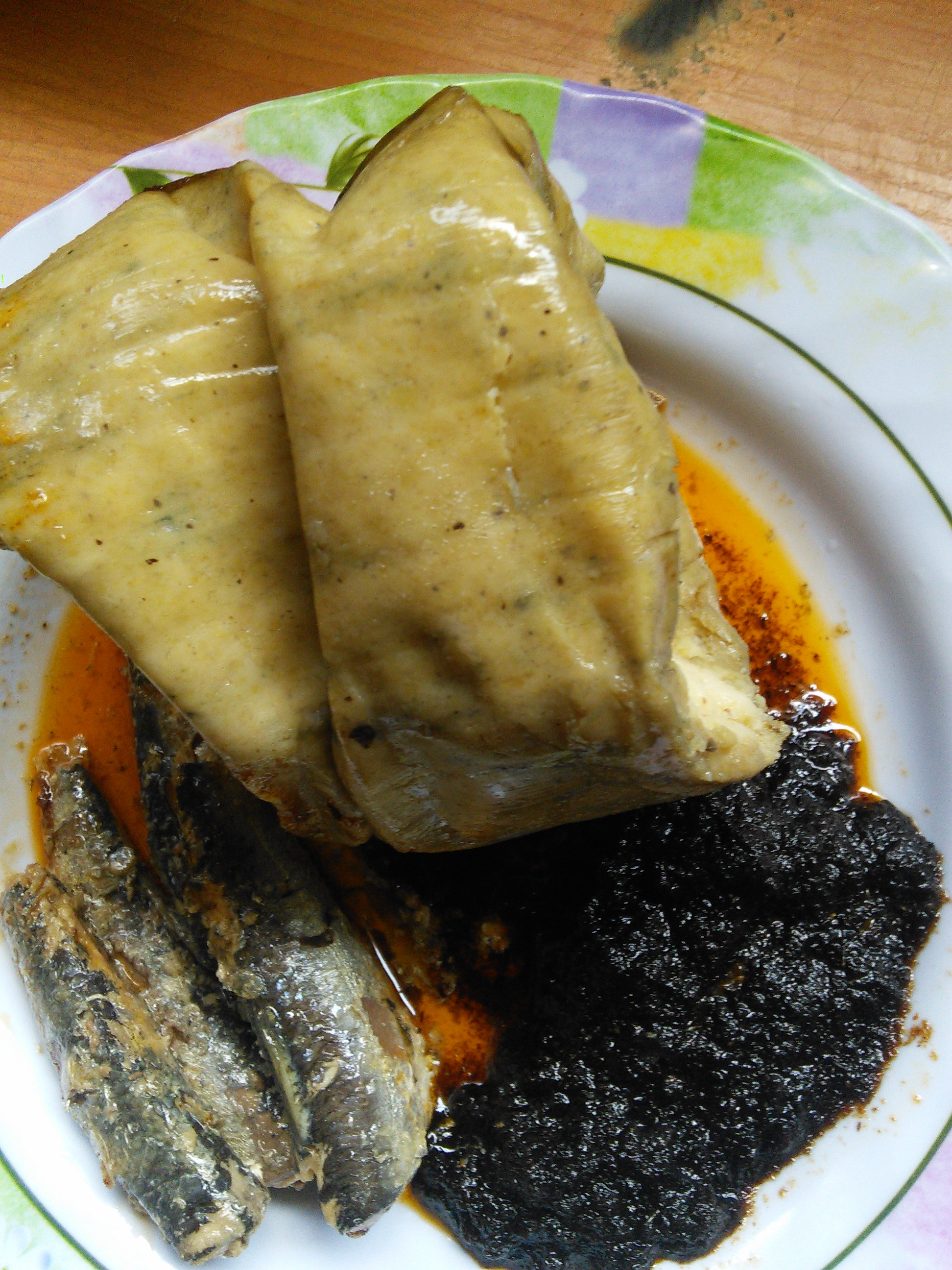
Fante kenkey served with shito and sardines

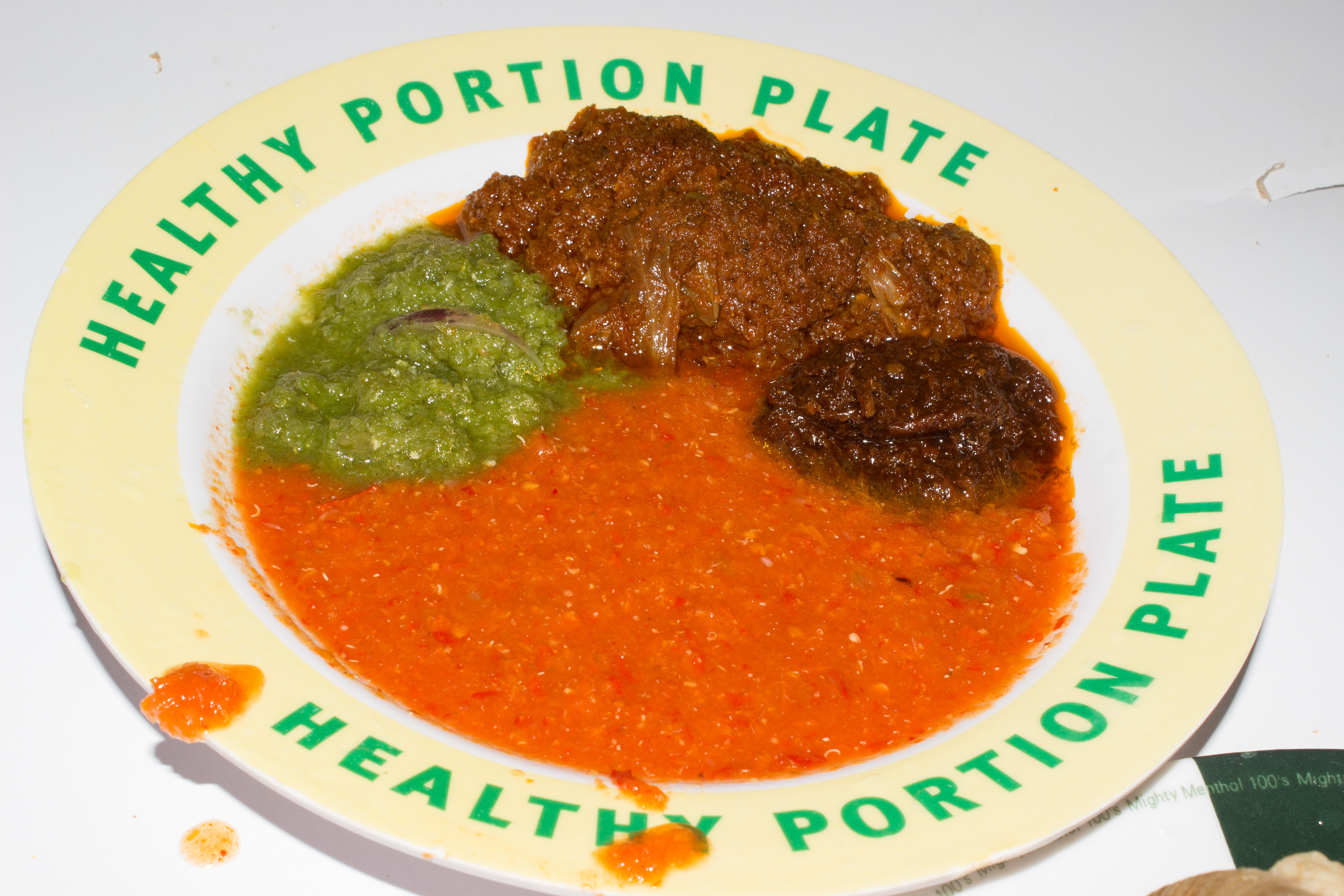
Gravy with shito (at top, green, red and black)

Shito or shitor din (lit. 'black pepper') is a hot black pepper sauce ubiquitous in Ghanaian cuisine. The name comes from the Ga language.

Shito sauce consists primarily of fish or vegetable oil, ginger, dried fish, prawns, crustaceans, garlic, peppers and spices. These ingredients are usually blended and cooked in vegetable or corn oil for a little over an hour to create the sauce. The blend of spices and fish differs between different regions and villages but owes its original recipe to the Ga tribe.

In Ghana, shito is used with a variety of dishes. These include kenkey, steamed rice, garri and waakye (rice and beans) and banku. Indeed, its uses have been adapted to that of a local ketchup, hot sauce or chili oil. It is not uncommon to find shito being eaten with white bread or spring rolls. In most Chinese restaurants across Ghana, shito replaces layou as a condiment to fried rice/steamed rice.

== Ground shito ==
Shito is not always hot black pepper and it can also be prepared without the use of oil. The ingredients for this type of shito are fresh pepper, onions, tomatoes and a little salt mashed together in an earthenware bowl popularly known as 'asanka' and a pestle shaped like an hour glass. The colour of the resulting sauce is red (shitor tsulu) or green (kpakpo shito) depending on the colour of the pepper used. It can be eaten with banku, akple, gari, kenkey and steamed rice.

== See also ==
- Chili oil
- Solomon Gundy
- Shacha sauce
