= Abunuabunu =

Ghanaian soup

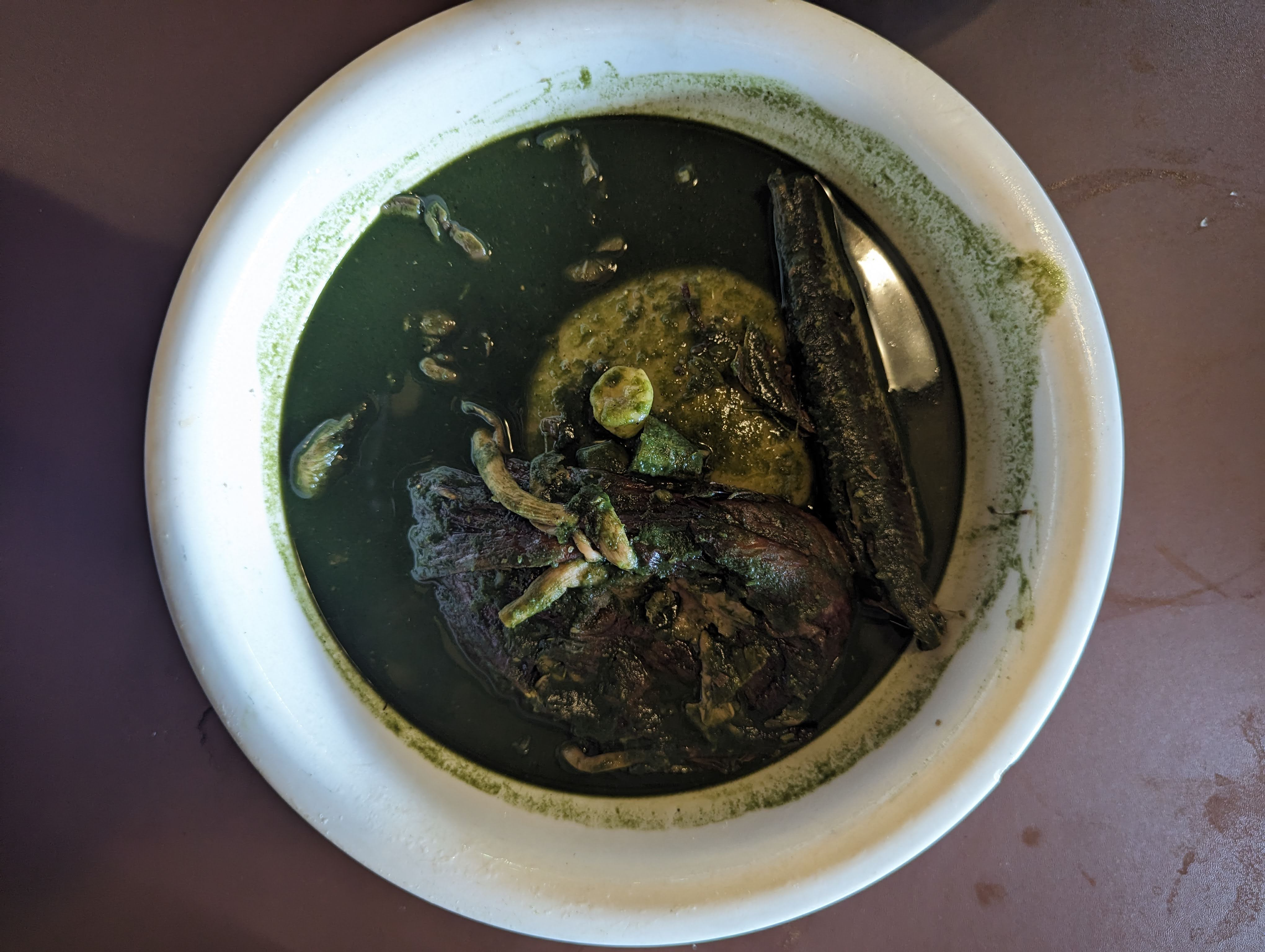
- Place of origin: Ghana
- Created by: Akan people
- Serving temperature: Hot
- Main ingredients: cocoyam leaves (kontomire), tomatoes, snails, smoked fish, onions, pepper, kwansesaawa and salt

Abunuabunu also known as Abubunabunu in Bono Twi is a soup from the Brong Ahafo Region of Ghana. It is made from cocoyam leaves (locally called kontomire) together with other ingredients (tomatoes, snails, smoked fish, onions, green pepper, turkey berries - called kwahu nsusua in Twi and salt).

It is commonly found and prepared among Akan people especially the Bono people since thus where the Abubunabunu soup originated from, and mostly eaten with fufu or banku.

== See also ==
- Ghanaian Cuisine
