= Kokonte =

African meal

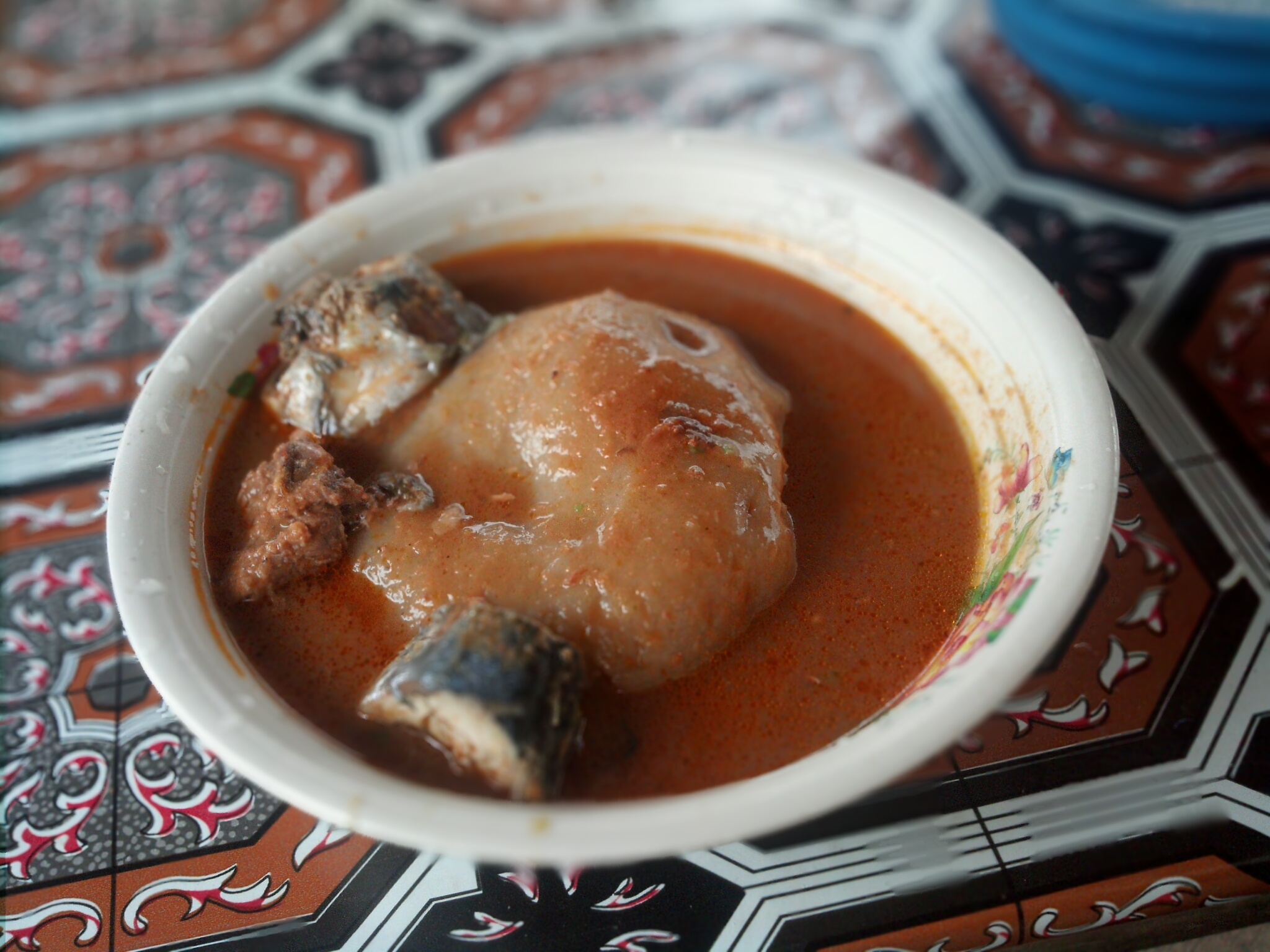
- Balls of kokonte
- Alternative names: "Face the wall"
- Type: Swallow
- Course: Stew, soup
- Place of origin: Ghana
- Region or state: Southern
- Serving temperature: Hot
- Main ingredients: Dry cassava

Konkonte
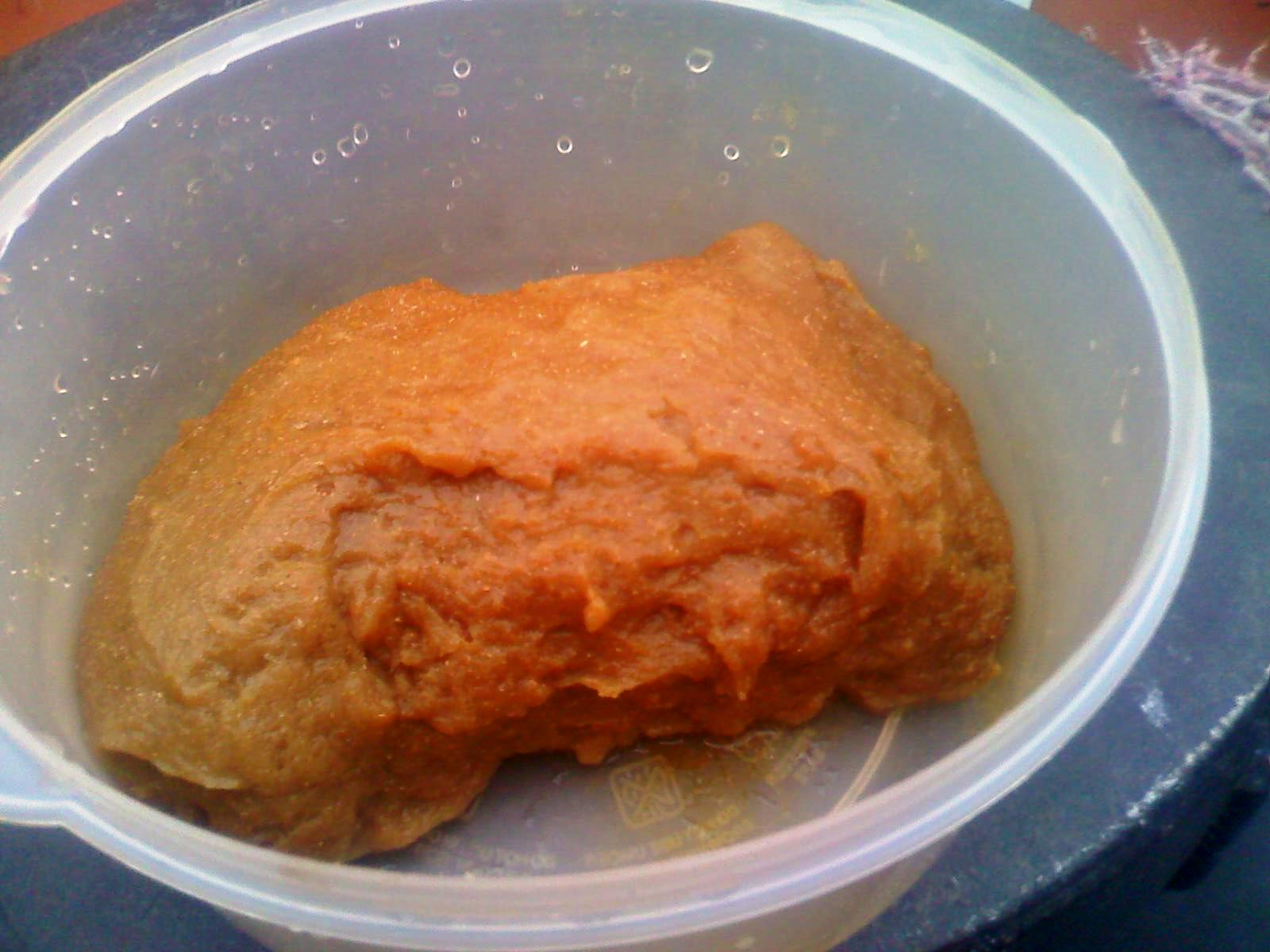
- Alternative names: Abitie, lapiiwa
- Type: Thick pap
- Place of origin: Ghana
- Region or state: All over Ghana
- Main ingredients: Cassava root

Kokonte, also known as abetiɛ, lapiiwa, lapelawa or “face the wall”, is a staple swallow food eaten in some parts of Africa including Togo, Ghana and others. In Ghana, kokonte is eaten by most of the ethnic groups like the Ga, Akan, Hausa, Kokonte usually is brown, grey and deep green depending on the type of ethnic group that prepares the dish. Kokonte is usually prepared out of dried cassava.

Konkonte is a Ghanaian dish made from cassava flour usually eaten with soups made from palm nut or groundnuts. It is popular in West African countries such as Nigeria and is also eaten in the Caribbean.

The English name for the dish is "brown fufu". It is similar to tapioca, a popular Brazilian dish that is also popular in the Volta Region of Ghana.

It is a simple dish made from dried and pounded cassava, or manioc, root and takes upon a brown appearance once made. In Ghana the dish is locally prepared by the Akans where its local name is derived from the Kwa languages.

== Appearance ==
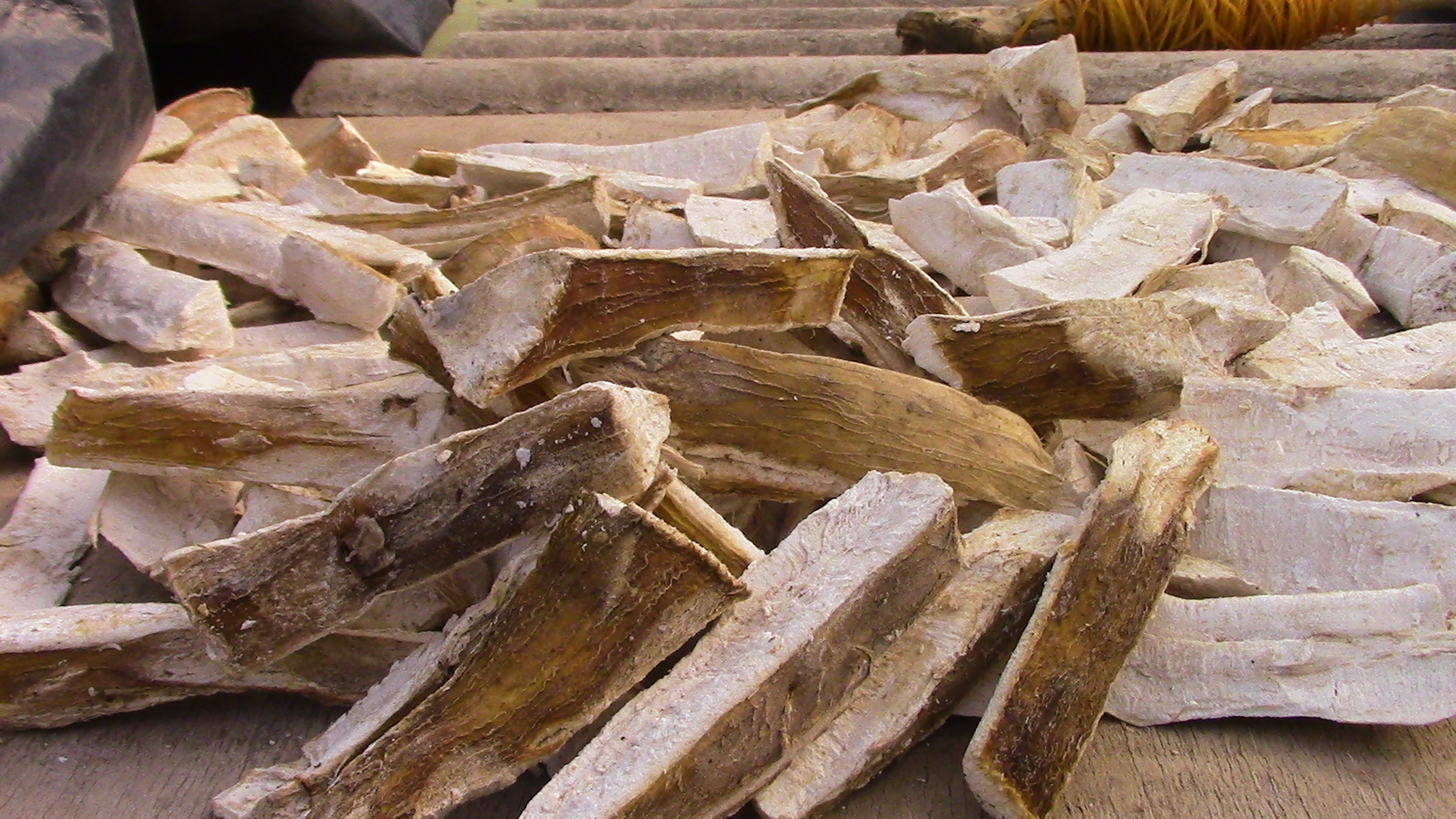
Brownish konkonte

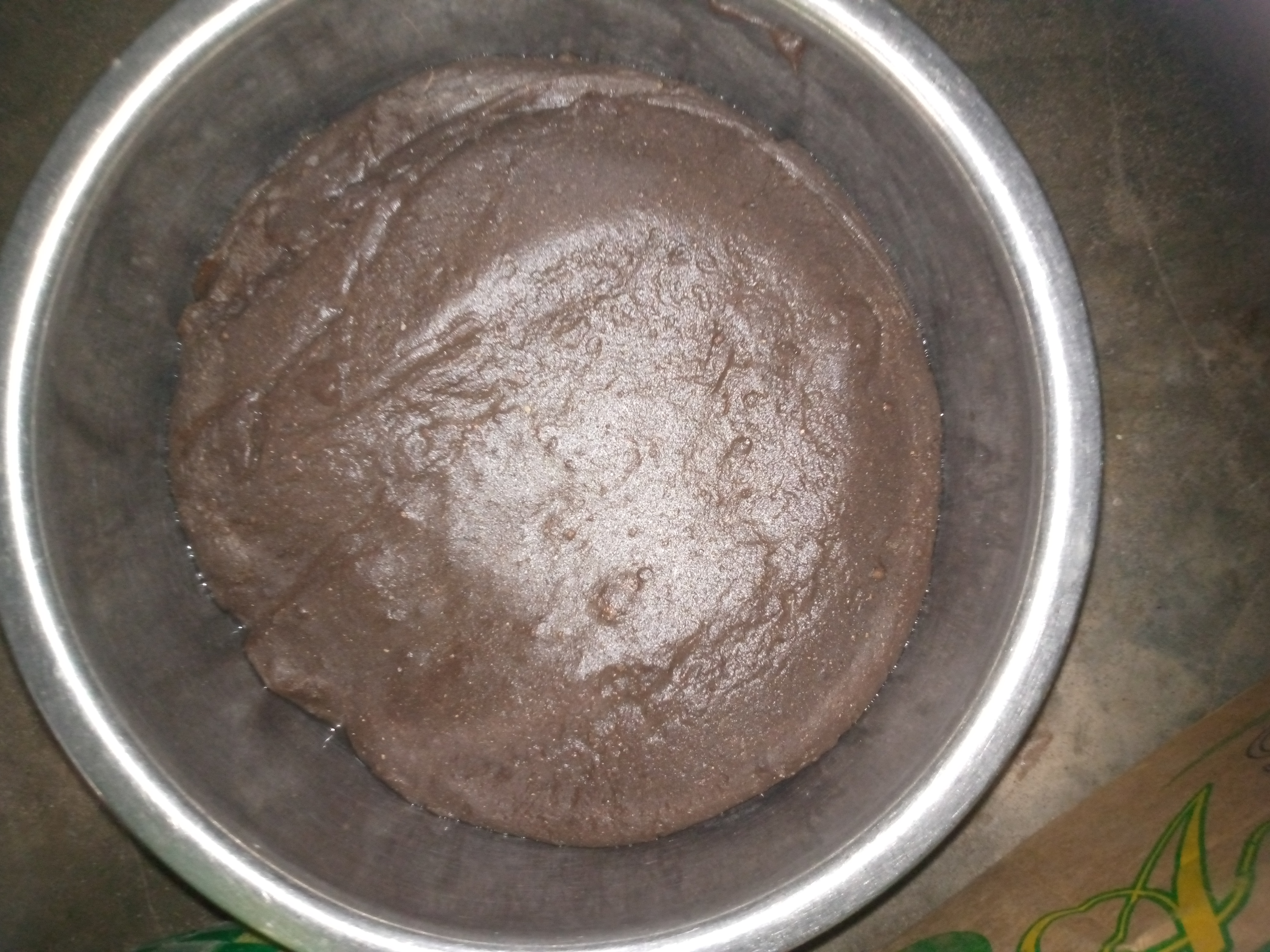
Konkonte, chocolate-brown

The appearance of the fully prepared konkonte depends on the type of cassava used and to what extent it has been dried. It generally looks brownish in color but can also be chocolate-brown.

== Preparation ==
- Put your hot water on fire to heat
- Add your dried powdered cassava or yam
- Stir firmly in water to prevent the paste from becoming lumpy
- Continue to stir firmly until a deep green, brown or grayish colour shows
- When the colour shows up you can dish out the food to serve attractively with soup like palm nut soup, groundnut soup, and others.

The basics of cooking konkonte begins with getting the cassava from the farm or from the nearest market. Cassava is one of the most widely eaten staples across Ghana because it is relatively cheap. One can buy relatively little of the flour and have enough for a whole family. It is this same cassava that is combined with plantain to prepare the Ghanaian dish known as fufu.

=== Pre-cooking ===
To get edible cassava, the plant must first be peeled. The peel can be used to feed livestock or used as manure to fertilize the farm yard (if a farmer). The edible cassava is then washed. It is cut into chips. These cassava chips are usually dried in the sun, then ground at a mill into powder.

There are a couple of ways to dry cassava chips. In Ghana, some farmers have what is termed in Twi as apa, which simply refers to a kind of booth made of palm fronds on which farmers place their harvested maize. This booth is intentionally made over the locally made type of kitchen called muka. This is done so that the smoke coming out of the firewood dries the maize, in this case the cassava chips. This method of drying gives the cassava chips a blackened appearance which affects the overall appearance of the final product— the prepared and cooked konkonte. The best method, though, is the natural way - drying the cassava chips in direct sunlight by spreading them over a drying tray usually made of a wood or aluminium big enough to spread the chips on.

One noteworthy fact is that, when the undried cassava chips are left unattended for enough time, they will start developing a form of brownish-like algae on the surfaces. After developing this fungus, the appearance of the final dish will be affected. Thus it is recommended that the chips are dried while they are fresh to retain the whitish nature of the final dish. However, many believe the browning of the chips also adds to overall taste of the konkonte.

To convert the dried chips into powder, it is pounded in a mortar and pestle, or taken to the mill to be ground. This gives the final product that will be cooked by adding water, kneading it on the fire until cooked, then you have your konkonte dish.

=== Cooking and serving ===
Konkonte powder can be mixed with room temperature water or hot water. Some people prefer adding hot water to the powder first before cooking. It is stirred on the fire until it thickens and then it is kneaded and cooked some more. If it is too thick one adds a little more hot water to it then covered with a lid for few minutes then kneaded against the pot until the water mixes it well, (you may have to repeat the hot water addition and kneading if necessary until you get the right consistency) until it is cooked. Serving 1: Once cooked, wet a deep bowl all around with a little water, scoop portion suitable for your meal and place in middle of bowl, draw all edges of konkonte to middle of portion, it will create a smooth base of konkonte underneath. Flip over and you should have a smooth ball to put your soup over. Serving 2 : Some people just scoop a portion into bowl and pour their soup over it.

== See also ==
- Ghanaian cuisine
- List of African dishes
- List of porridges
