= Asanka =

Ghanaian grinding pot

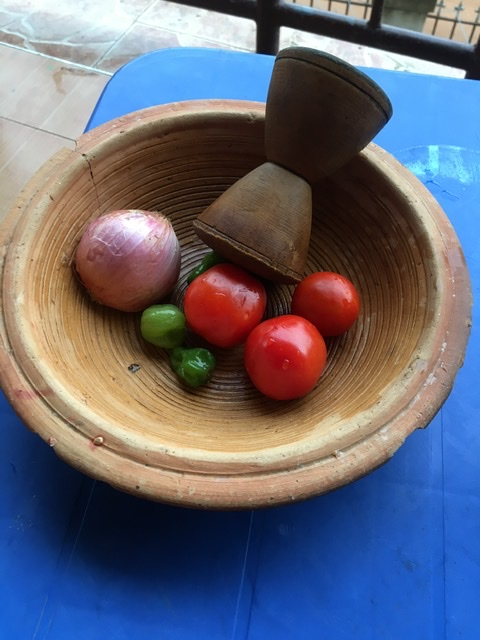
An asanka with a wooden tapoli

The asanka is a Ghanaian earthenware grinding bowl characterised by ridges on its inner surface. It is a common kitchen tool in Ghanaian homes, usually accompanied by a wooden pestle or masher called an eta or tapoli in local languages. Often referred to as a "traditional blender" or "pounding pot", the asanka is particularly relied on in areas without electricity.

The bowl is known by various names across different ethnic groups in Ghana; the Ga call it a kaa, while Akans refer to it as an apotoyewaa or asanka. Aside from food preparation, it is also commonly used as a serving bowl in chop bars (traditional eateries).

== History ==
Earthenware dishes are among the oldest kitchen tools in Ghana and can be found in almost every Ghanaian household. Pottery-making is an integral part of Ghanaian culture and a traditional profession for women in several districts. Indigenous people in towns across the Eastern, Bono and Ashanti regions — such as Amanfrom, Besease, Jejeti, Mpraseso, Oframoase and Tanoso — are heavily involved in the mass production of these pottery items.

== Usage ==
Using an asanka requires skill, forearm strength and the correct technique to prevent wrist strain. Ingredients are usually chopped into smaller pieces before being placed into the bowl to make grinding easier. The ridges inside the asanka create friction, enabling it to grind effectively. The user forcefully rubs the wooden masher (the eta or tapoli) against the ridges to crush, pulverise and blend the ingredients over time.

The asanka has several primary uses in Ghanaian cuisine:

- Grinding and crushing ingredients for soups and stews.
- De-hulling black-eyed peas.
- Smoking and steaming ingredients. Among the Akans, ingredients are sometimes crushed and heated directly in the bowl on a stove to make a dish commonly called abom.
- Serving local dishes such as fufu, banku, konkonte and rice balls with soup, particularly in chop bars.

Because it is made of clay, the asanka must be carefully cleaned and maintained to ensure its durability and prevent breakage.
