= Fufu machine =

Kitchen appliance

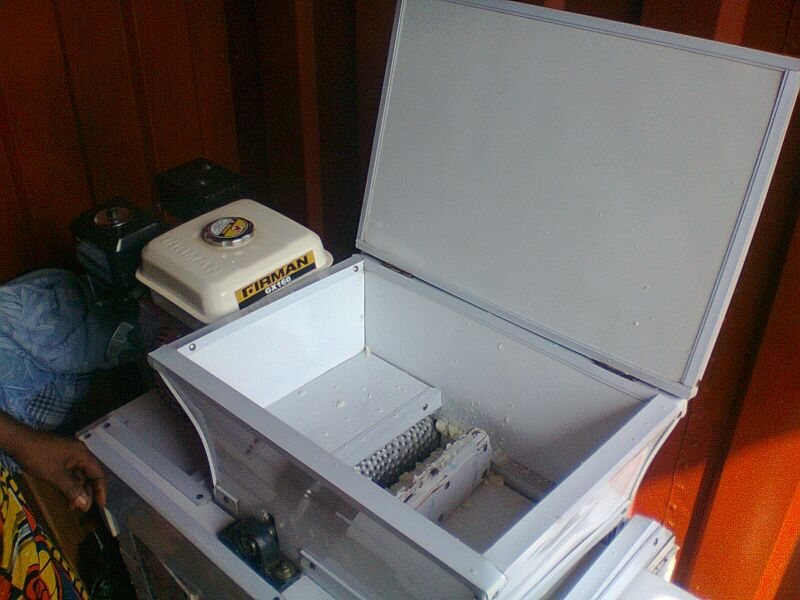
Machine used in making fufu

A fufu machine is a kitchen appliance used to pound cooked starchy vegetables, particularly cassava, plantains, or yams, into the West and Central African staple food fufu.

Fufu machines can achieve the fine, dough-like, pasty texture of fufu in about one minute; traditional hand-pounding methods generally required at least 30 minutes for the same result.

== Development ==
The first fufu machine was developed in 2004 by Ghanaian electrical-equipment dealer Fadegnom Charles, who produced small numbers of electric fufu machines for local consumption. A mass-marketable design by a team led by Professor Kwadeo Kesse, Dr Lawrence Ansong and R.E Doddoo at Kwame Nkrumah University of Science and Technology (KNUST) was released shortly thereafter. The machine saw significant adoption in both homes and small businesses in Accra by 2014.

In 2017, a Togolese entrepreneur named Logou Minsob successfully invented the model Foufoumix which allows for efficient mixing of the fufu into a well-set texture and consistency.
