= Peanut soup =

Soup made from peanuts

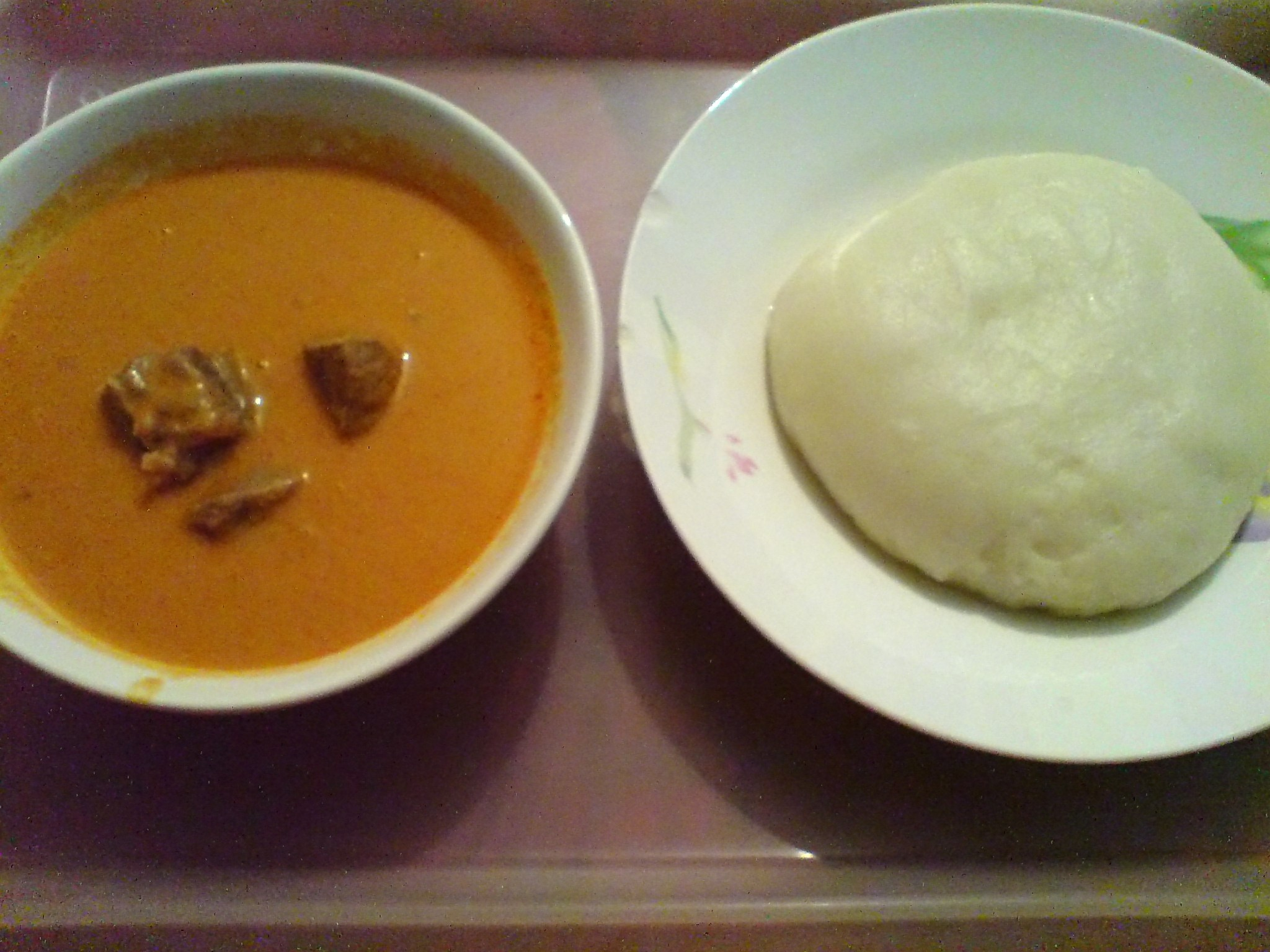
- West African peanut soup with fufu
- Alternative names: Groundnut soup
- Type: Soup
- Course: Main
- Region or state: West African cuisine
- Serving temperature: Hot
- Main ingredients: Peanuts, onions, tomatoes, eggplants, okra, ashanti pepper, ginger, bay leaves, rosemary, peanut butter, water

Peanut soup or groundnut soup is a soup made from peanuts, often with various other ingredients. It is a staple in West African cuisine but is also eaten in East Asia (Taiwan), the United States (mainly in Virginia) and other areas around the world. It is also common in some regions, such as Argentina's northwest, Bolivia and Peru, where it can sometimes be served with bone meat and hollow short pasta or fries. In Ghana it is often eaten with fufu, omo tuo and banku and is often very spicy. Groundnut soup is also a native soup of the Benin (Edo) people in Nigeria and it is often eaten with pounded yam. Some of the essential ingredients used in making it are ugu, oziza leaves, Piper guineense (uziza seed) and Vernonia amygdalina (bitter leaf).

It is prepared from groundnut which is mashed into a paste, usually termed as groundnut paste. When cooked, the groundnut is ashy pink in color. Groundnut soup is eaten with eba, fufu, banku, kenkey and so on. It is a delicacy that Nigerian, Ghanaian and people in other African countries consume, such as in Sierra Leone. In Ghana, it is known as nkatenkwan in Akan language and "Azidetsi" in Ewe language.

== Images ==
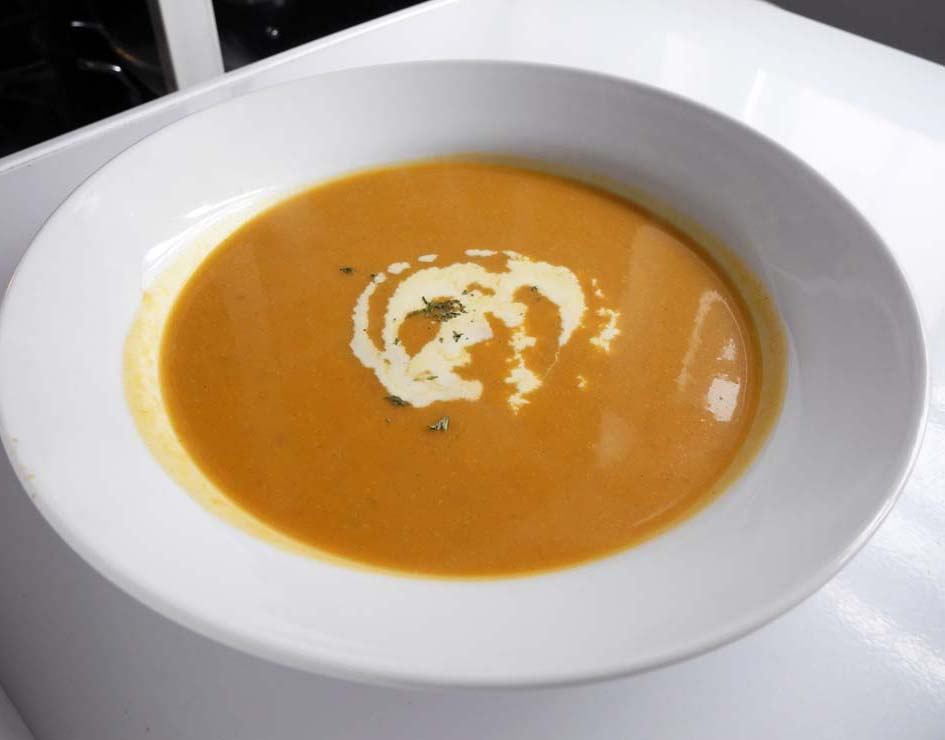
Garnished ground nut or peanut soup

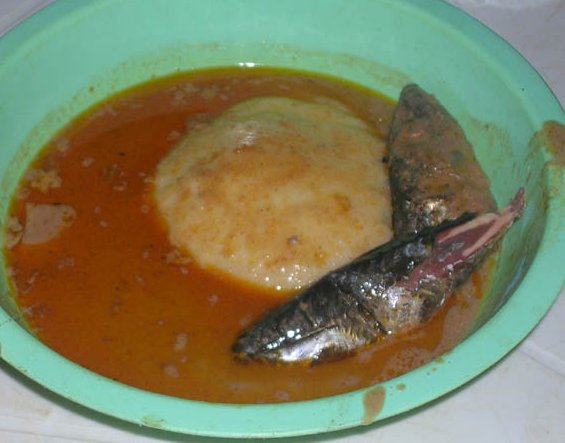
Peanut soup with fufu and fish

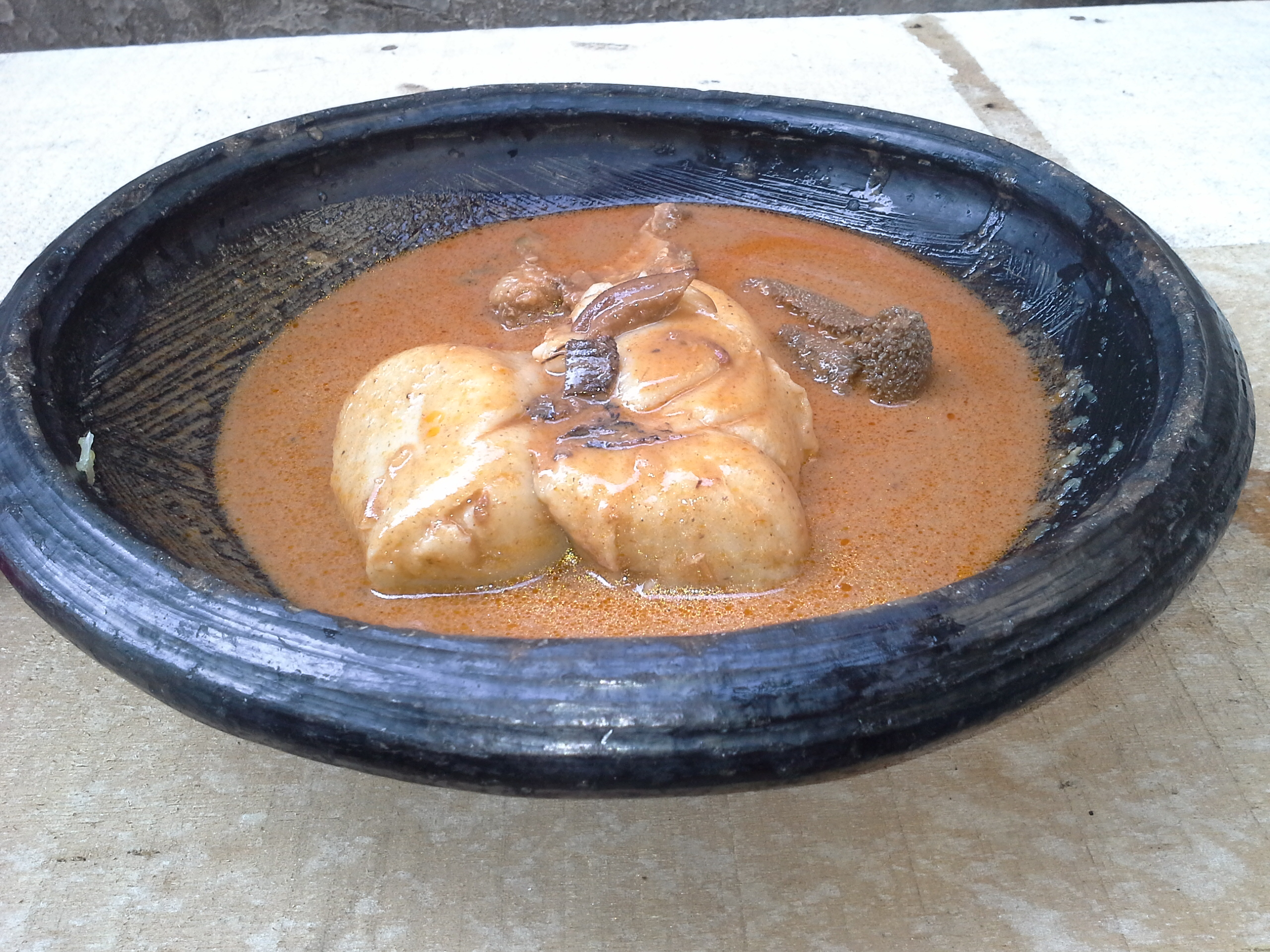
Ghana groundnut soup with fufu

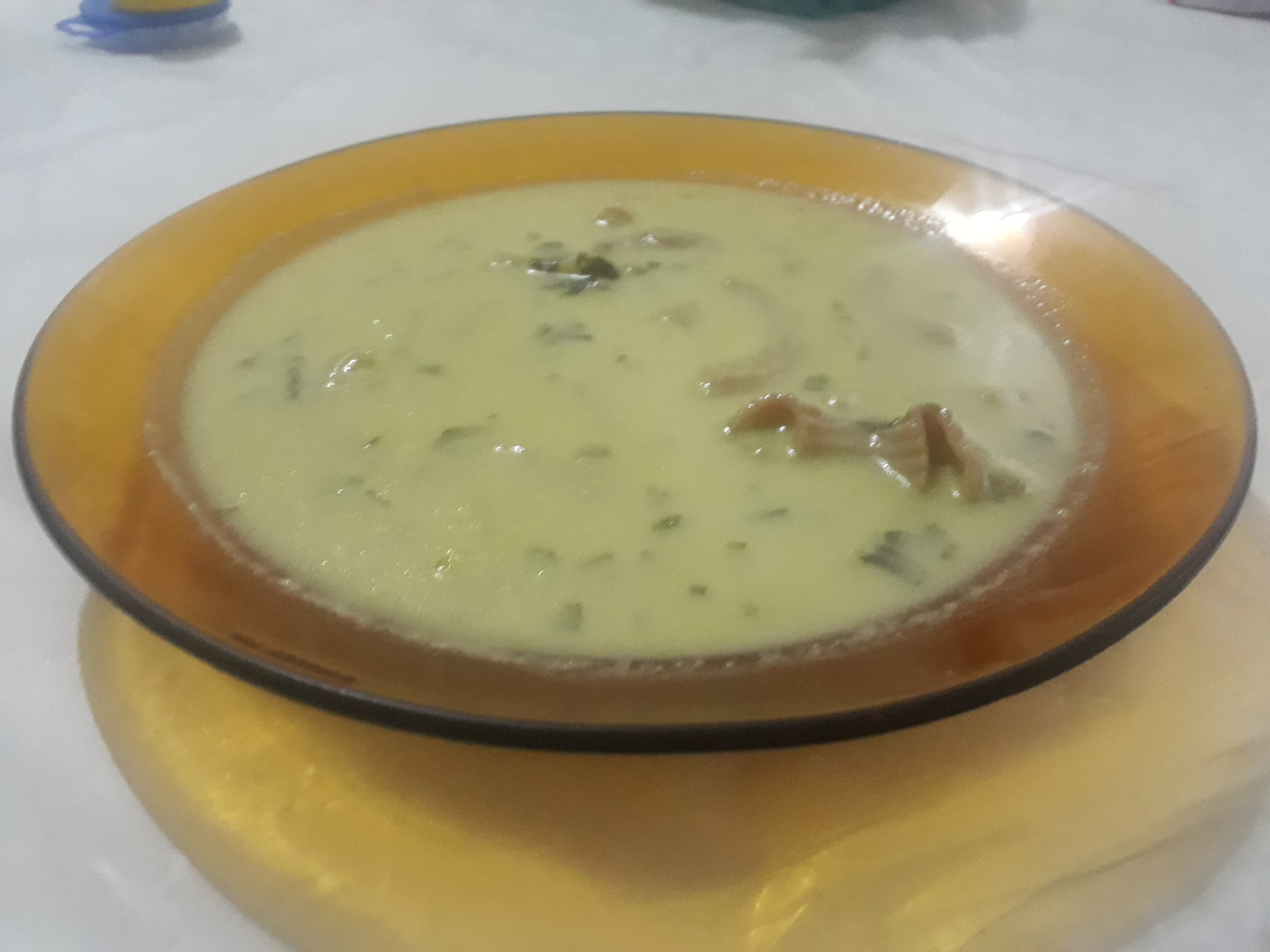
Latin American peanut soup

== See also ==
- Peanut stew
- Palm nut soup
- List of peanut dishes
- List of soups
