= Fufu =

Dough-like food in African cuisine

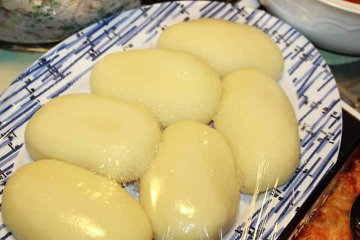
- Alternative names: Fufuo; foufou; foofoo; foutou; sakora; sakoro; couscous de Cameroun
- Type: Swallow
- Place of origin: West Africa
- Main ingredients: Unfermented cassava, plantains or cocoyams
- Food energy (per 240 g serving): 398 kcal (1,670 kJ)
Nutritional value
(per 240 g serving)
- Protein: 3.6 g
- Fat: 7.2 g
- Carbohydrate: 81 g
- Similar dishes: Chikwangue; nsima; pap; sadza; ugali

Fufu (or fufuo, foofoo, foufou /ˈfuˌfu/ foo-foo) is a pounded meal found in West African cuisine originally made from boiled cassava, plantains, and cocoyam. Fufu's prevalence in West Africa has been noted in local literature, such as Chinua Achebe's Things Fall Apart.

Fufu is a Twi word originating from the Akans in Ghana. However, the word has been expanded to include several variations of the pounded meal found in other African countries including Sierra Leone, Liberia, Ivory Coast, Burkina Faso, Benin, Togo, Nigeria, Cameroon, the Democratic Republic of Congo, the Central African Republic, the Republic of Congo, Angola and Gabon. It also includes variations in the Greater Antilles and Central America, where African culinary influence is high.

In Ghana, Ivory Coast, and Liberia, they use the method of separately mixing and pounding equal portions of boiled cassava with green plantain or cocoyam, or by mixing cassava/plantain/cocoyam flour with water and stirring it on a stove. Its thickness is then adjusted to personal preference, and it is eaten with broth-like soups. Meanwhile, in Nigeria fufu is made solely from fermented cassava, giving it its unique thickness compared to that found elsewhere. It is eaten with a variety of soups (such as Egusi soup and Ogbono soup), vegetables, beef, and fish.

In recent years other flours, such as wheat semolina, maize flour, or mashed plantains may take the place of cassava flour. This is common for those in the diaspora or families that live in urban cities. Families in rural areas with access to farmland still maintain the original recipe of using cassava. Fufu is traditionally eaten with the fingers, and a small ball of it can be dipped into an accompanying soup or sauce.

== Names ==
- Angola: funge, fúngi
- Benin: santana, foufou
- Burkina Faso: tô
- Cameroon: couscous, couscous de manioc
- Central African Republic: foufou
- Congo-Kinshasa and Congo-Brazzaville: fufú, moteke, fufú, luku , bidia
- Gabon: foufou
- Ghana: fufu, fufuo, sakɔro
- Haiti: tomtom
- Ivory Coast: foutou, foufou
- Liberia: fufu
- Mozambique: sadja, sadza, xima
- Nigeria: fufu, santana, akpụ, ụtara, loi-loi, swallow, tuk rogo
- Sierra Leone: foofoo, foofoo
- Togo: foufou

== In Africa ==
Before the Portuguese traders introduced cassava to Africa from Brazil in the 16th century, fufu was mainly made from cocoyam, plantain, and yams. The traditional method of eating fufu is to pinch some of the fufu off in one's right-hand fingers and form it into an easily ingested round ball. The ball is then dipped in the soup before being eaten.

=== Angola ===
In Angola, fufu is served as part of the national dish but is called fungi/fungee and is made using cornmeal and okra.

=== In Cote d'Ivoire ===
In Côte d'Ivoire, the word foutou is also used. Ivorian foufou is specifically mashed sweet plantains, whereas foutou is a stronger, heavier paste made of various staple foods such as yam, cassava, plantains, taro or a mix of any of those.

=== In Cameroon ===
In the French-speaking regions of Cameroon, it is called "couscous" (not to be confused with the North African dish couscous).

=== In Ghana ===
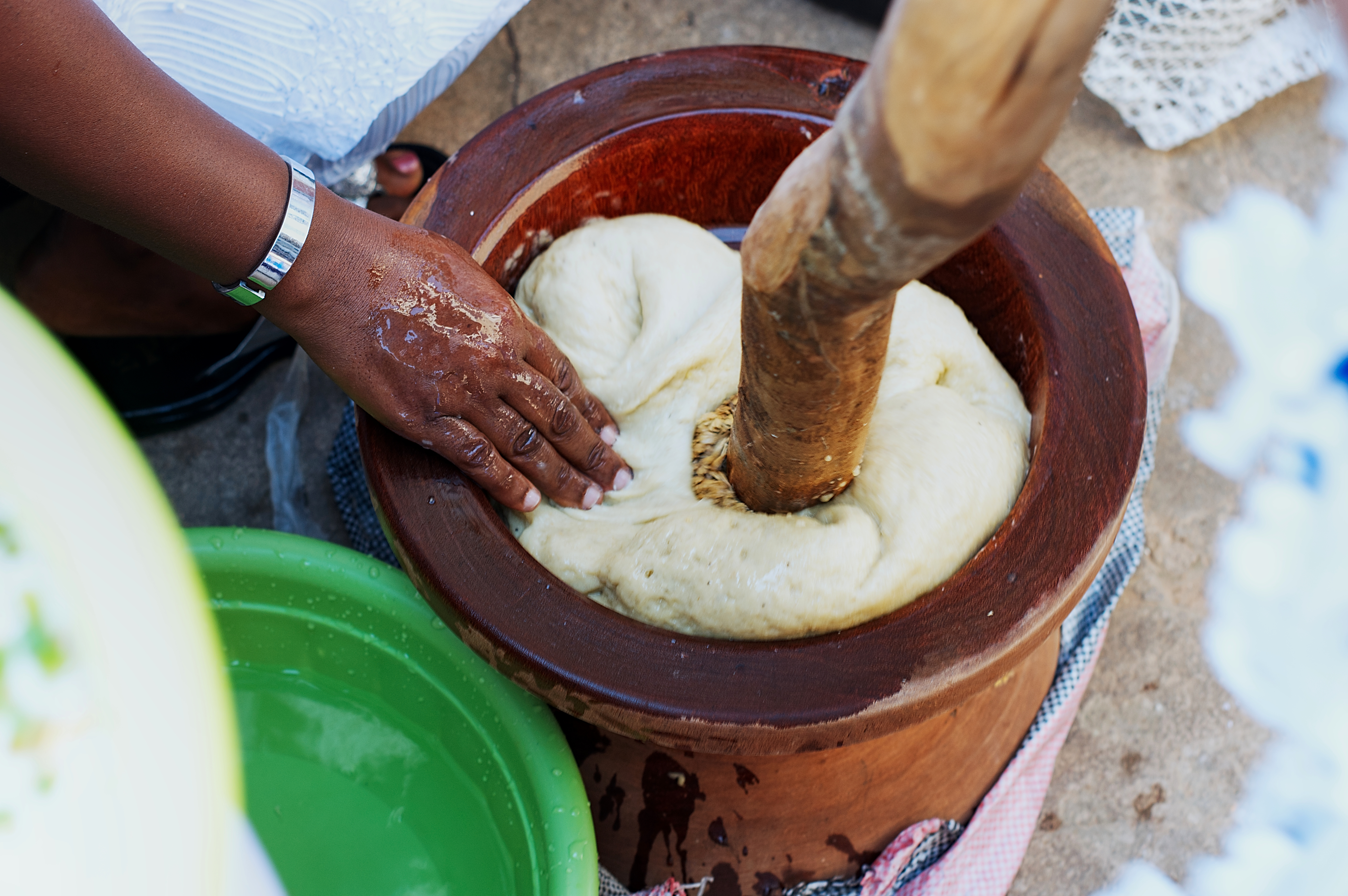
Pounding of fufu in Ghana

It is believed to originate in what is now modern-day Ghana, by the Asante, the Akuapem, the Akyem, the Bono, and the Fante people of the Akan ethnic group of Ghana and now generally accepted across the country. According to historian Miller, "the word Fufu literally means white in Twi." and is likely derived from the whitish colour of the cassava component in Ghanaian fufu. In Ghana, it is made out of pieces of boiled cassava and/or other tubers such as plantain or cocoyam. It is mostly pounded together in a locally made wooden mortar (woduro) using a wooden pestle (woma). In between blows from the pestle, the mixture is turned by hand, and water is gradually added until it becomes a soft, sticky dough. The mixture is then formed into a rounded slab and served. With the invention of the fufu machine, preparation has become much less labour-intensive. The resulting food is eaten with liquid soups (nkwan) such as light soup (nkrakra nkwan), abenkwan (palm nut soup), nkatenkwan (peanut butter soup), and abunubunu soup. Today, it also features in Beninese cuisine, Cameroonian cuisine, Guinean cuisine, Congolese cuisine, Nigerian cuisine, and Togolese cuisine, where it is eaten with hot pepper soup, okra, or other kinds of stew. Fufu was a major cuisine of the Ashanti Empire. In Ghana, fufu, also known as fufuo, is white and sticky, if plantain is not mixed with the cassava when pounding.

=== In Nigeria ===
In Nigeria, fufu or akpu is a popular food made from fresh or fermented cassava. The Nigerian version of fufu differs from that of Ghana's; however, it remains a staple food in both countries. In Nigeria, cassava-based fufu, referred to as akpu (Igbo), is common among various ethnic groups in Nigeria. Its preparation and consumption are deeply embedded in the cultural and culinary practices of these communities. The preparation of Yoruba fufu differs slightly from other ethnic groups. It is made from fermented cassava of which the soft pieces are sieved. The starchy remains are boiled and stirred with a wooden rod until it turns into dough. Akpu, properly punctuated as akpụ in Igbo, is the Igbo word for cassava. Requiring several days to make, akpu is often eaten with egusi soup. Akpu is traditionally made by peeling and washing raw cassava until it is white. The cassava is soaked in water for 3–4 days to ferment and become soft. It is then filtered with a porous calabash or sieve. Excess water is quickly drained by pouring the wet paste into a sack, upon which is placed a heavy and flat item (e.g., a plank and brick). The paste is then pounded and molded into large balls and simmered for 30–60 seconds, after which it is thoroughly pounded to remove lumps, molded again into smaller balls, boiled for 15–20 minutes, and then pounded until smooth.

== In the Caribbean ==
In Caribbean nations with substantial populations of West African origin (such as Cuba, the Dominican Republic, Haiti and Puerto Rico), plantains, cassava or yams are mashed with other ingredients.

=== Cuba ===
In Cuba, the dish retains its original African stem name, termed simply as fufú or with added descriptive extensions like fufú de plátano or fufú de plátano pintón.

=== Dominican Republic ===
In the Dominican Republic, mangú is very similar to fufú. Mangú is made from mashed, boiled green plantains, typically topped with sautéed red onions cooked in vinegar.

=== Haiti ===
In Haiti, it is called tonm tonm and foofoo. It is mostly made of breadfruit but can be made of plantain or yams and is usually served with an okra based stew or soup. It is primarily consumed in the southernmost regions of Haiti namely the Grand'Anse and Sud departments. The city of Jérémie is regarded as the tonmtonm capital of Haiti.

=== Puerto Rican ===
Puerto Rican mofongo, in keeping with the creolized cuisine traditions of the Caribbean, tends toward a fufú of much higher density and robust seasoning. While keeping a conspicuous African character, mofongo has borrowed from the island's Iberian culinary tradition, to create a dish made of fried green and yellow plantains, cassava or breadfruit. Unlike the mushier Caribbean and West African fufús, mofongo is generally firmer and crustier. To prepare mofongo, green plantains are deep-fried once unlike twice fried tostones. Next, they are mashed in a 'pilon' (mortar) with chopped garlic, salt, fat (lard, olive oil, butter, or bone marrow), other spices and broth can also be added. The resulting mash is then pressed and rounded into a hollowed crusty orb. Meat, traditionally chicharrón, is then stuffed into the chunky ball of fried green plantains. Some recipes call for a meat or vegetable salsa criolla" (related to American Creole sauce) poured atop the hot sphere. In the trendier "mofongo relleno", typical of western Puerto Rico, seafood is all over, inside and outside. Traditional mofongo, as previously cited, comes seasoned and stuffed with meat and bathed in a chicken broth soup. Because of its elaborate process of preparation and its sundry ingredients, poet and blogger Arose N Daghetto called the mofongo a type of "fufú paella" and branded it as "the big daddy of fufús". Although mofongo is associated with being fried, boiled and roasting plantain mofongo predate fried mofongo and is still excited but a rare find in Puerto Rico. A dish called funche made with taro, green and yellow plantains boiled and mashed with butter, garlic, and pork fat was once popular in Puerto Rico. Once mashed it was formed into balls and eaten with broth made from sesame seeds. Funche is written in early Puerto Rican cookbooks around the 1800s, but can probably be traced back to African slaves on the island. Funche today in Puerto Rico is cornmeal cooked in coconut milk and milk.

=== Anglo-Caribbean ===
The vegetable or fufú sauce in the Anglo-Caribbean is not fried first. Plantain is not used as much, as it is used in so many dishes. Fufu is usually part of, or added to, a soupy sauce or on the side with a soupy dish. Similarly to Angola, Barbados serves it as part of the national dish and is called cou-cou and uses cornmeal or, less commonly, split peas, green bananas, or breadfruit instead, like several other English Caribbean islands.

== Nutrition ==
100 g dry fufu flour (made from cocoyam) contains 2 g of protein, 0.1 g of fat and 84 g of carbohydrates, and 267 calories. One serving (240g) of cooked fufu contains 3.6 g of protein, 7.2 g of fat and 81 g of carbohydrates, and 398 calories.

Fufu is low in cholesterol and rich in potassium. As such, it is commonly prescribed by doctors for people who have a low level of potassium in their blood.

== Gallery ==
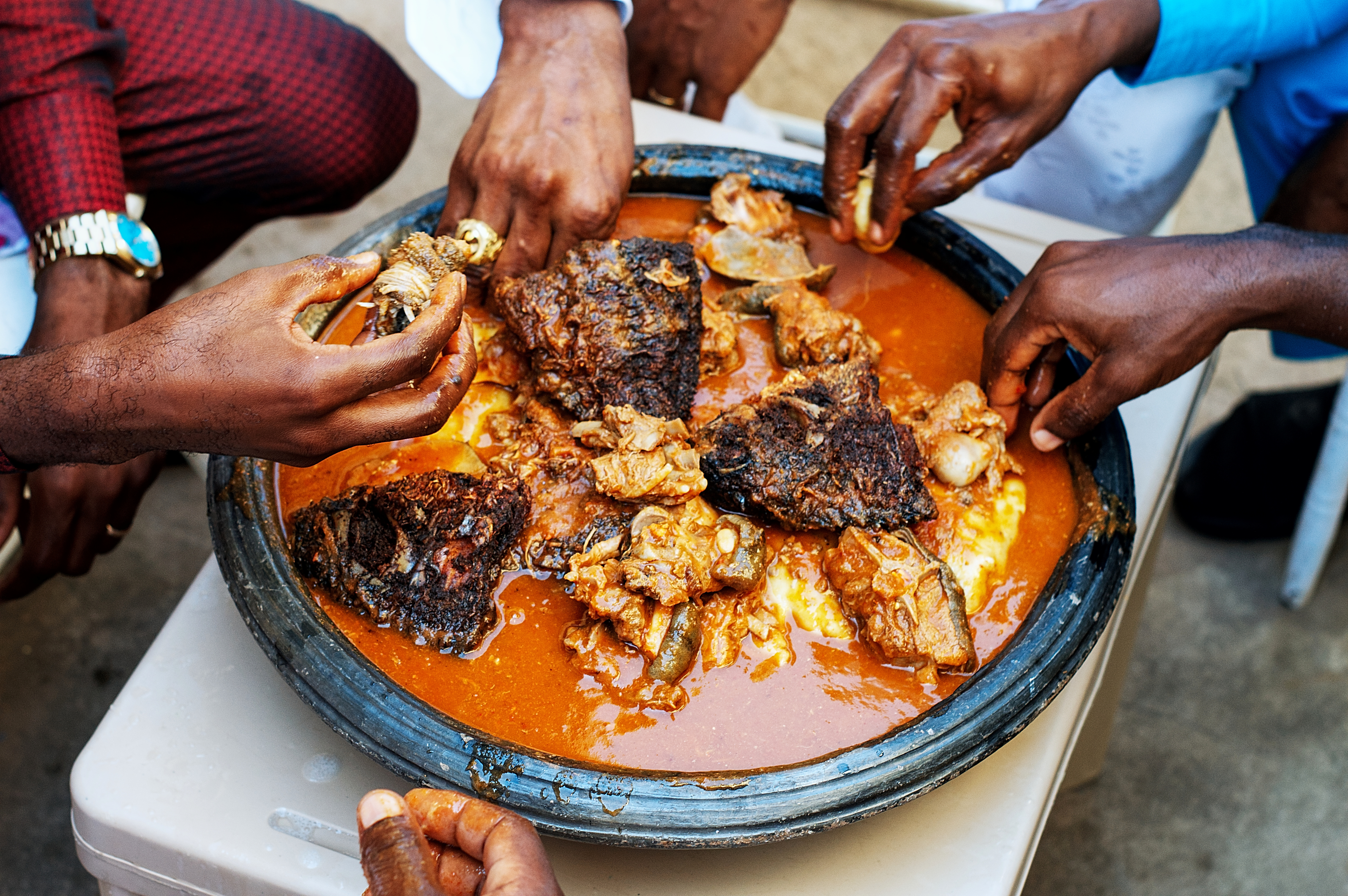
A family eating fufu

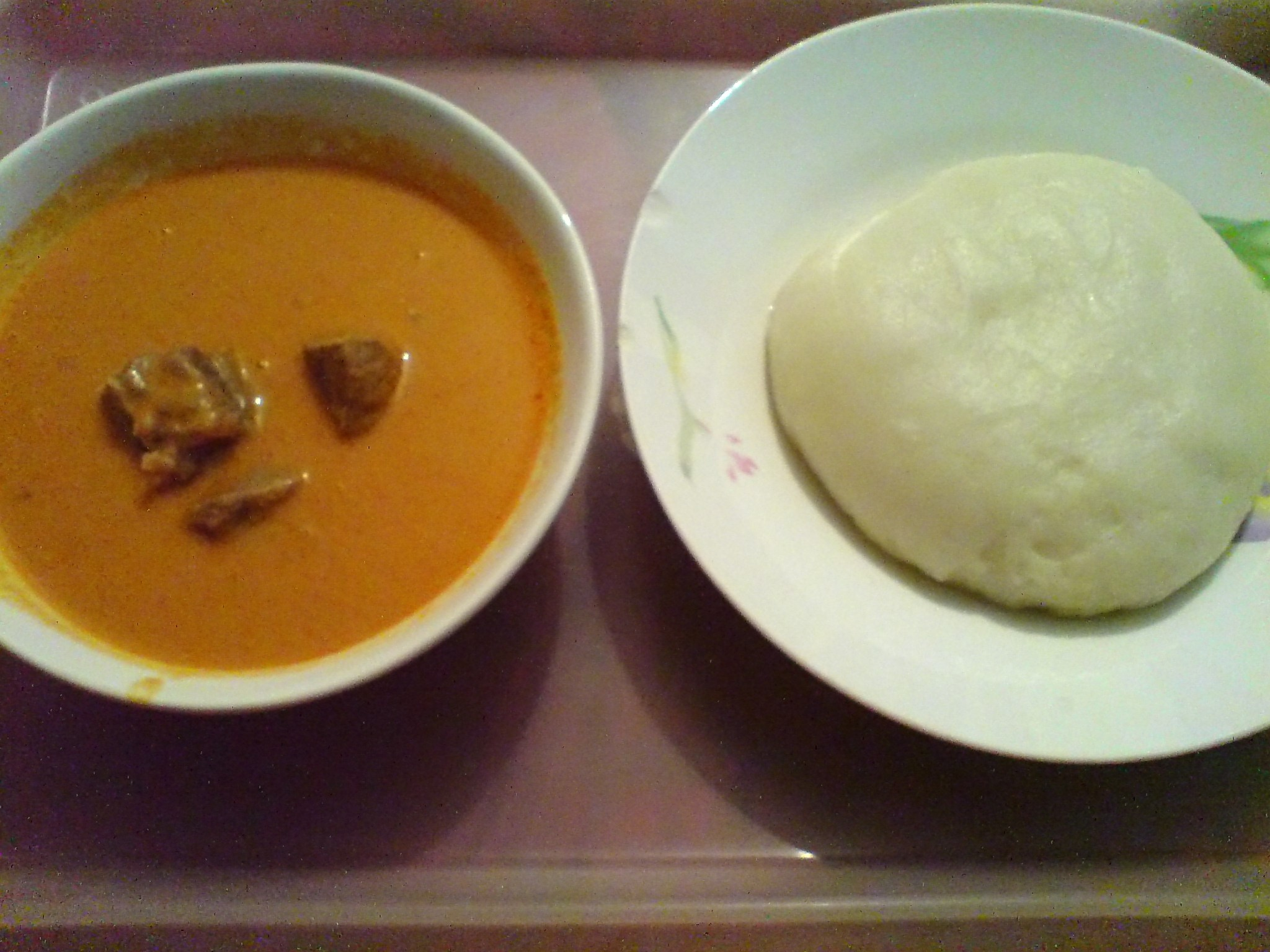
A plate of fufu (right) accompanied by peanut soup

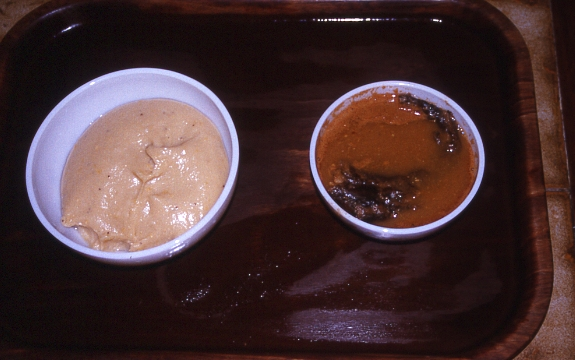
Fufu (left) and Palm nut soup (right)

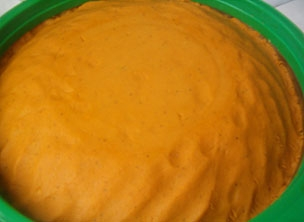
Fufu

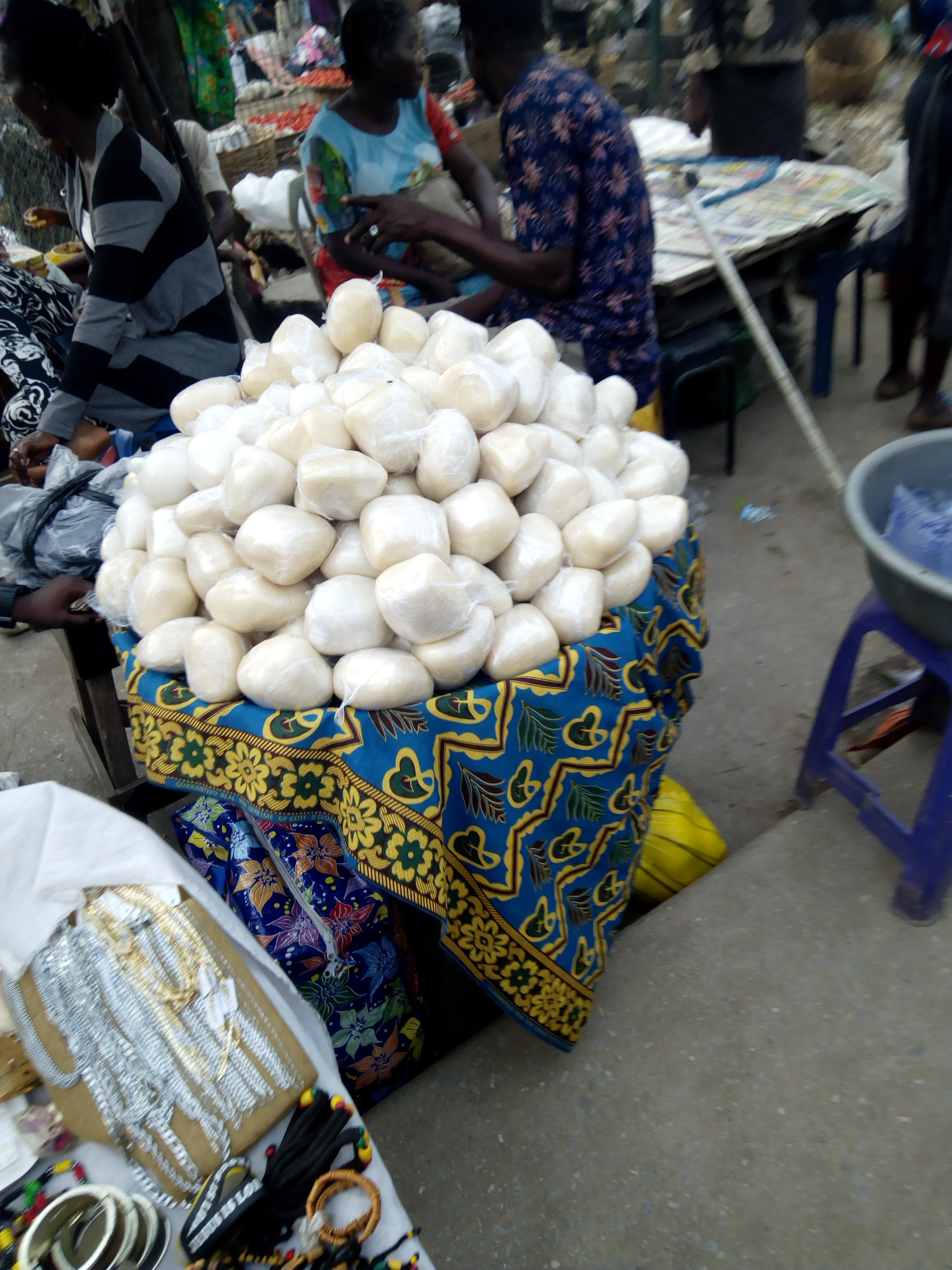
Nigerian food: fufu being sold on the street in Lagos

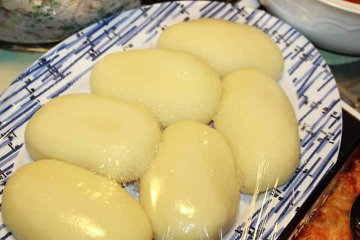
Wrapped fufu

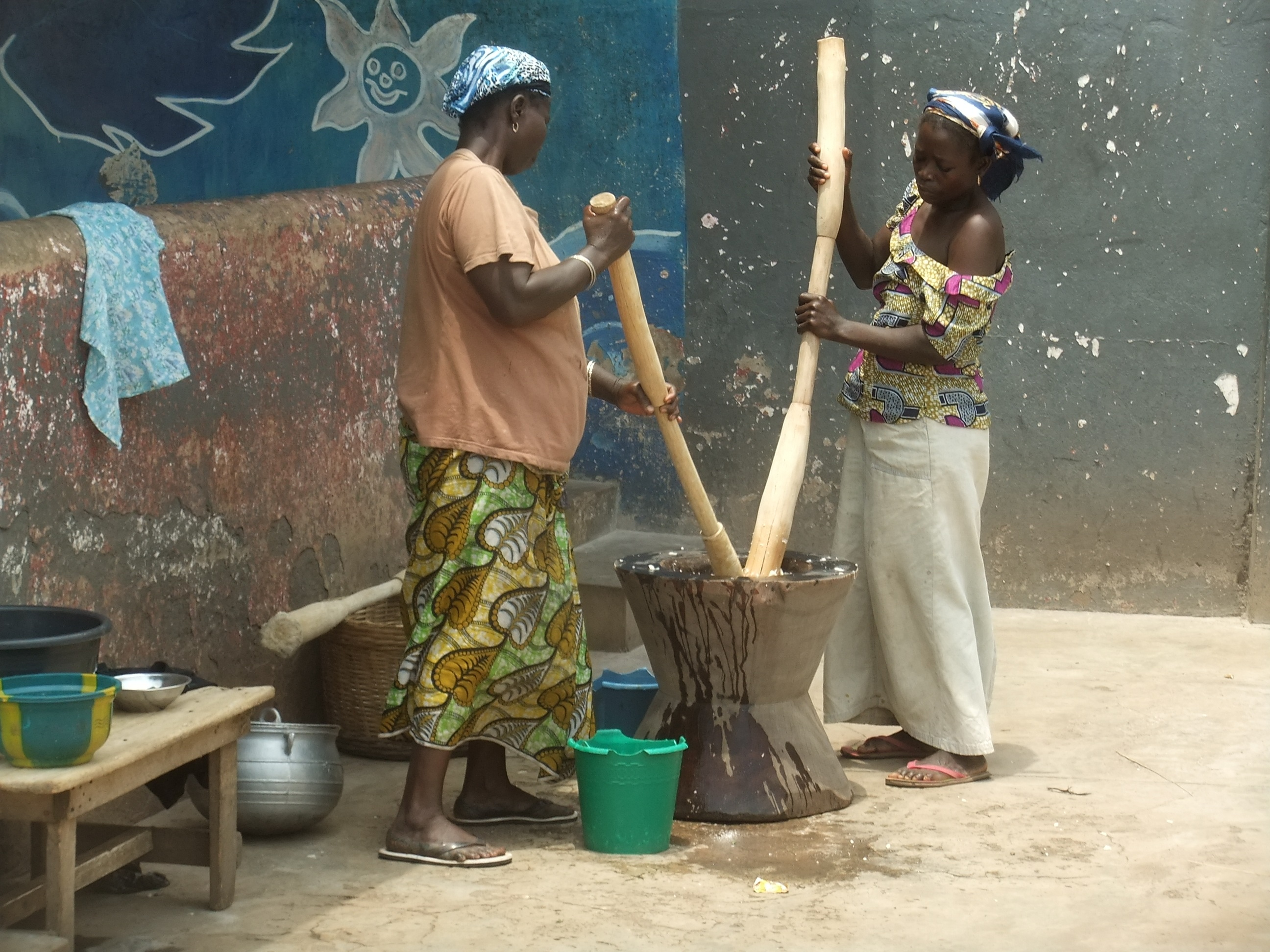
Preparing fufu in Togo

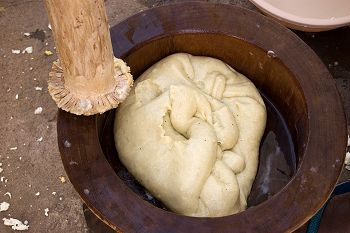
Wooden pestle and mortar for pounding fufu

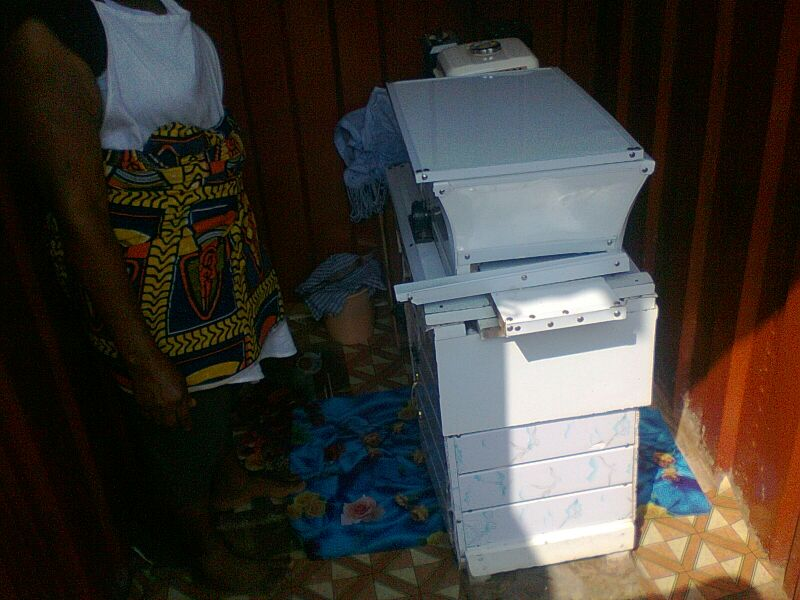
Fufu machine used by a food vendor

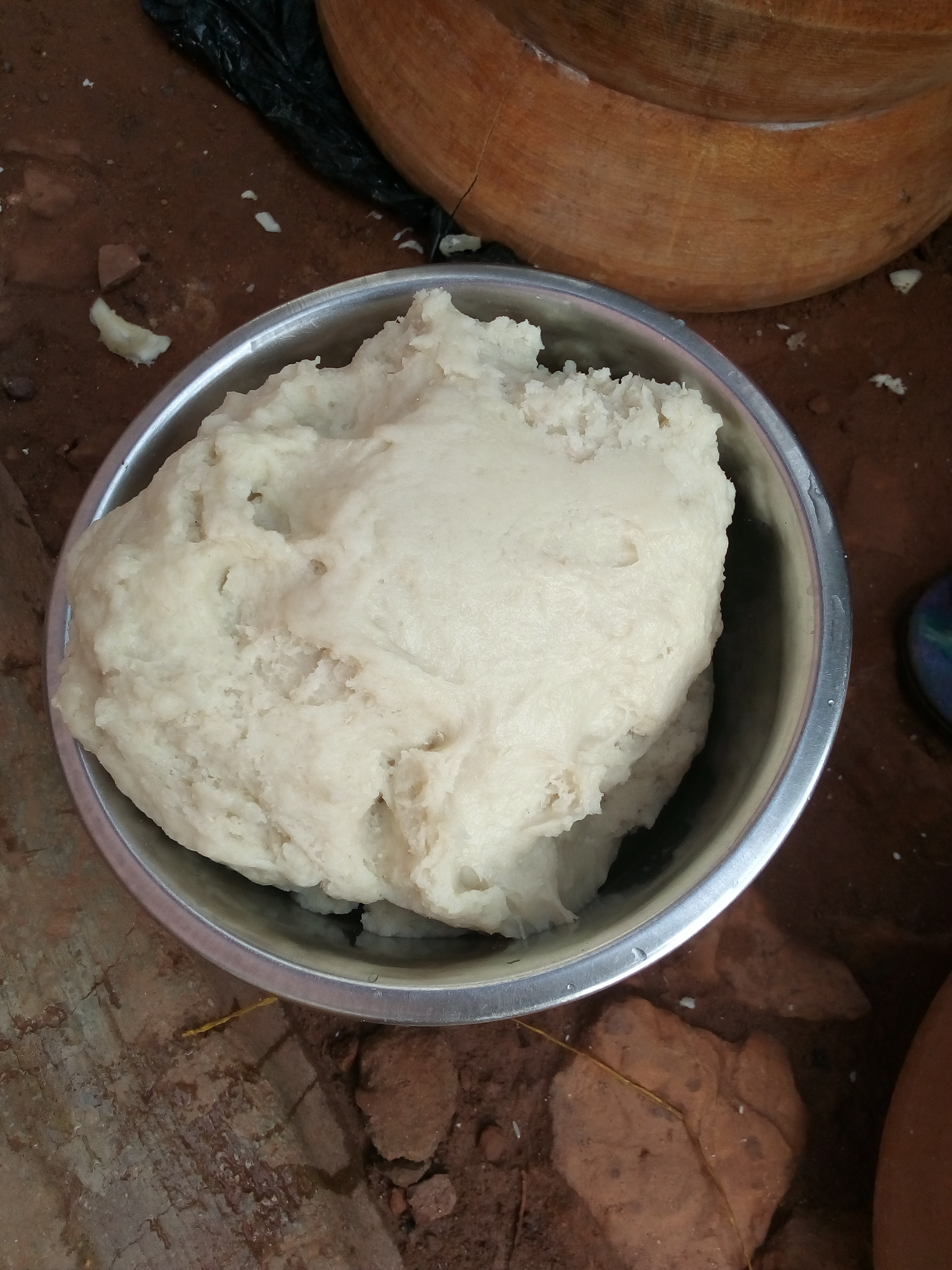
Pounded fufu

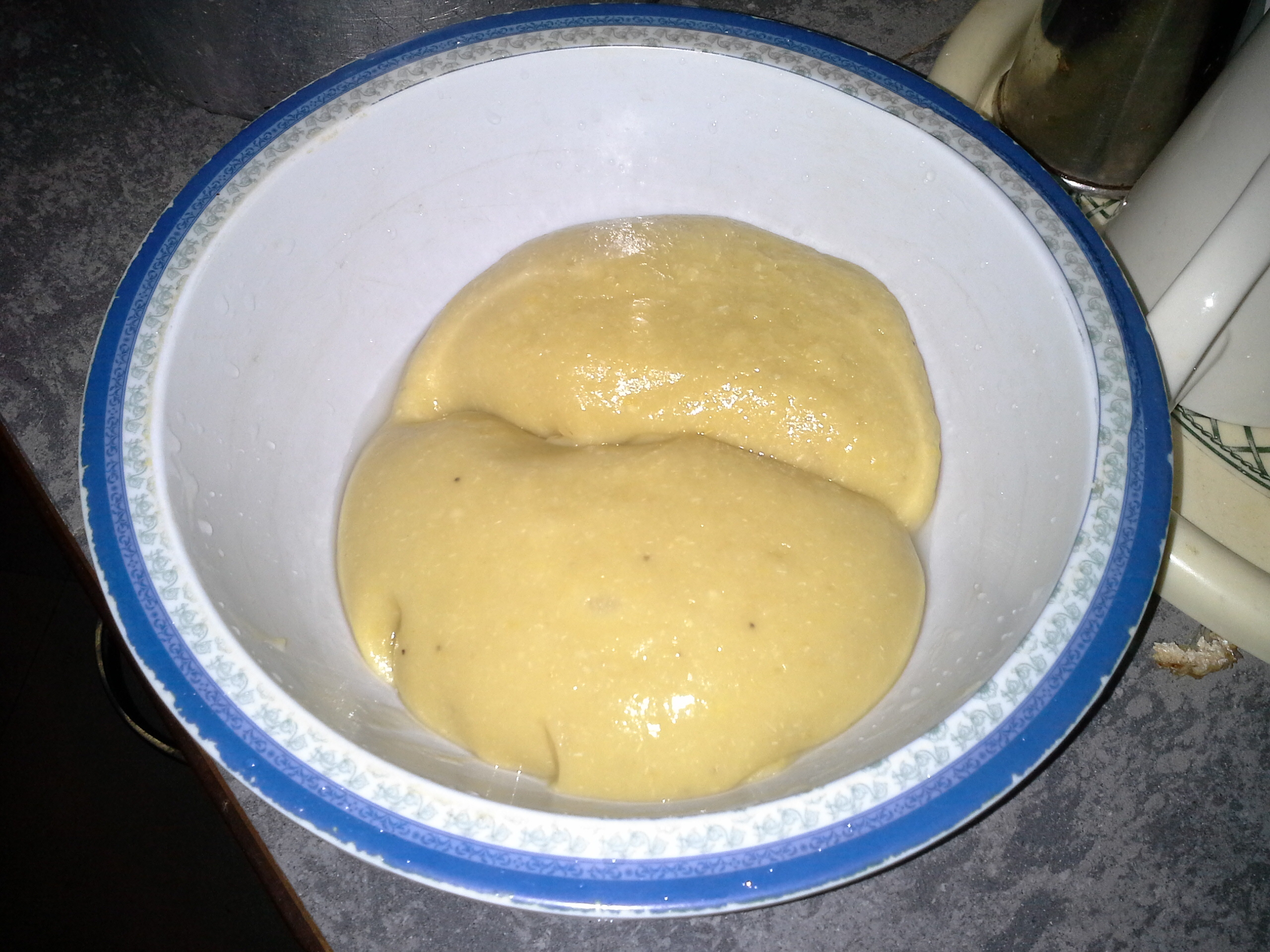
Fufu from Ghana

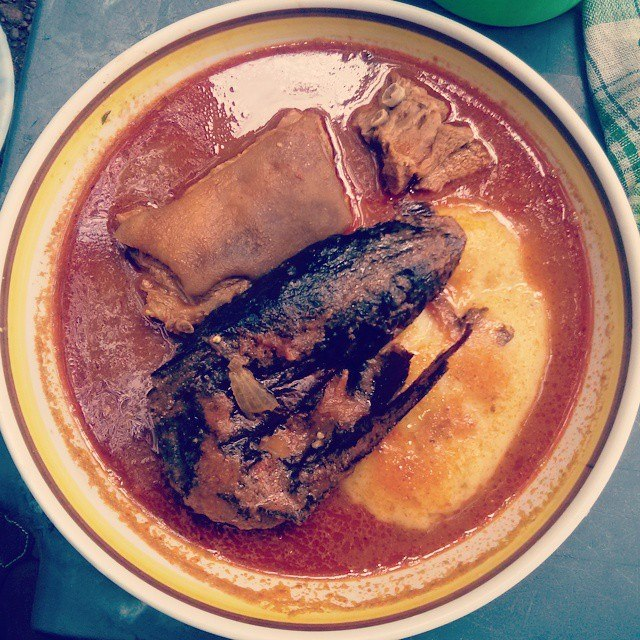
Ghanaian fufu with light soup, goat meat, and smoked fish

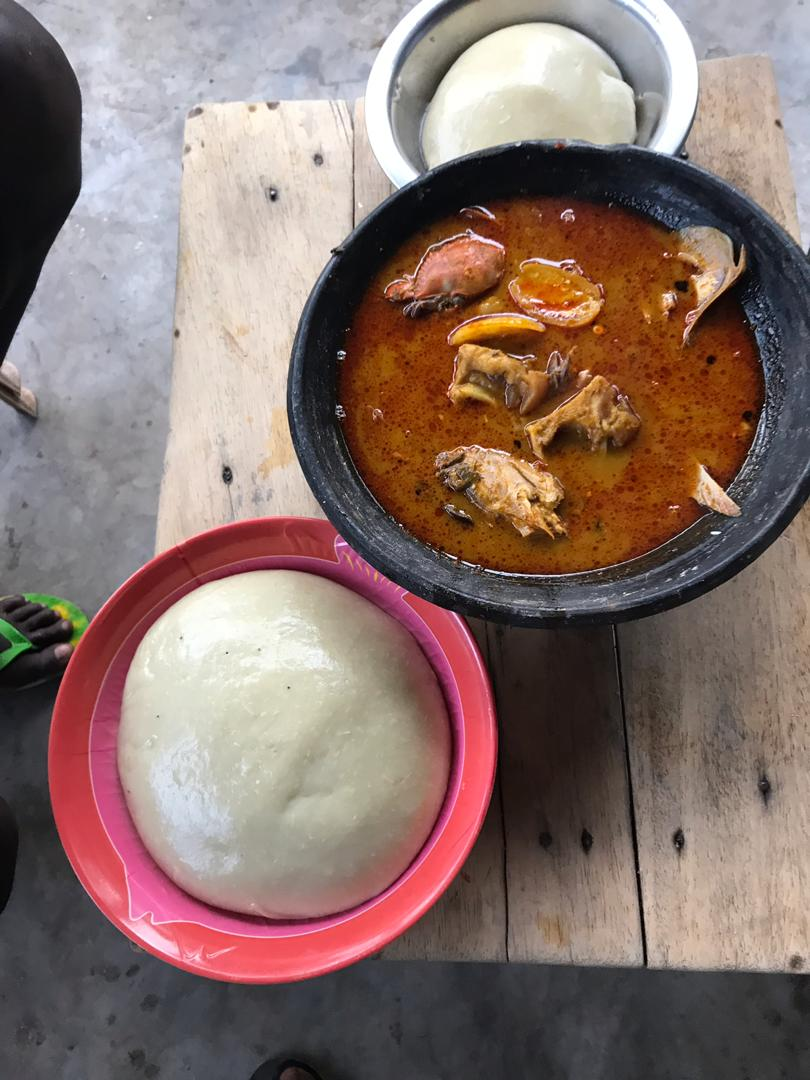
Fufu and light soup in asanka

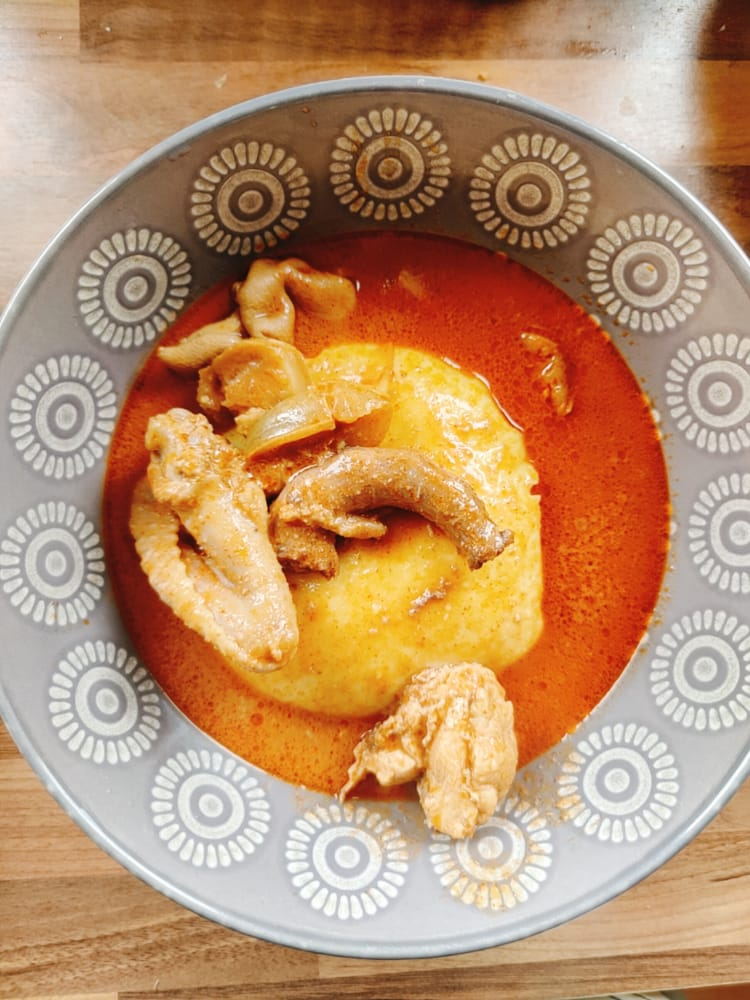
ceramic bowl

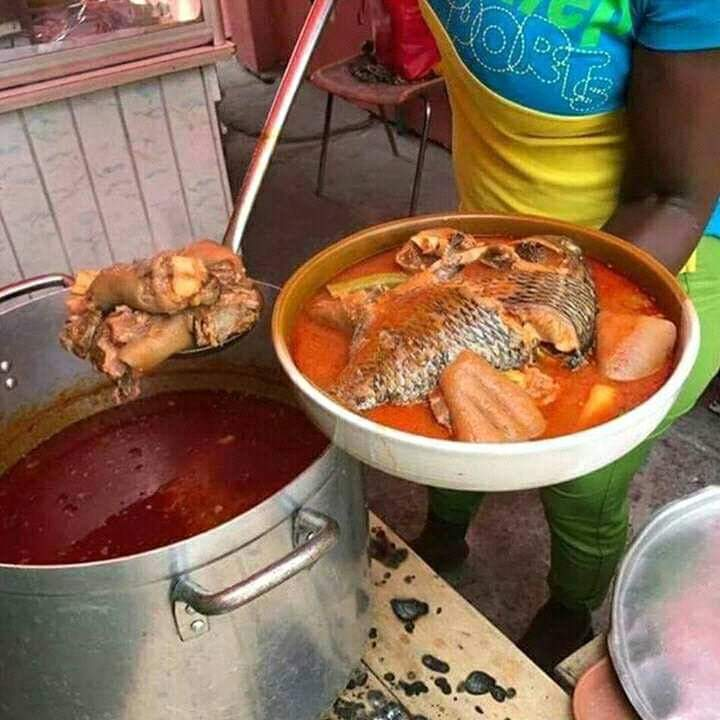
Fufu with tilapia, meat and light soup

== See also ==
- African cuisine
  - List of African dishes
- Ragi mudde
- Ambuyat
- Asida
- Attiéké
- Bazeen
- Congolese cuisine
- Eba
- Garri
- Grits
- Konkonte
- List of maize dishes
- Mămăliga
- Mangú
- Mashed potato
- Mochi
- Mofongo
- Plakali
- Poi
- Polenta
