= Banku (dish) =

Staple food of Ghana

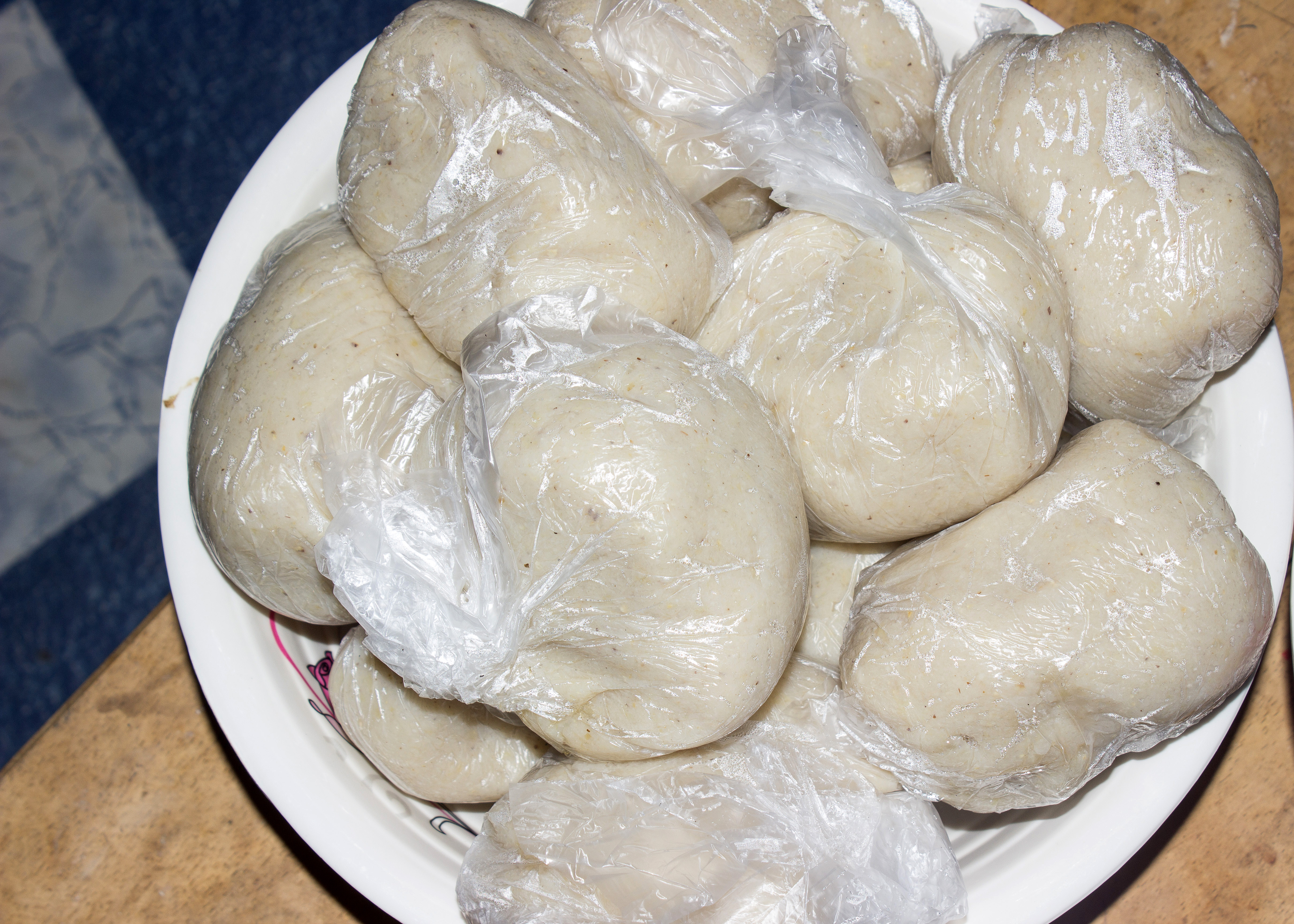
- Balls of banku
- Alternative names: Akple, ɛtsew
- Type: Swallow
- Place of origin: Ghana
- Serving temperature: Hot
- Main ingredients: Corn dough, cassava dough, salt and water

In Ghanaian cuisine, banku and akple (//) are staple dishes made of a slightly fermented cooked mixture of maize and cassava doughs formed into single-serving balls.

Banku is cooked in hot water until it turns into a smooth, whitish paste, served with soup, okra stew or a pepper sauce with fish.

Akple is preferred by the people of the southern regions of Ghana—the Ewe people, the Fante people and the Ga-Dangme—but it is also eaten across other regions in Ghana. Banku is a softer variety eaten by the Ga-Dangme (Ga or Dangbe), while the Fante people also have a drier variant of the dish they call ɛtsew.

== Etymology ==
Banku is a distinctively Ga-Dangme term. Banku is coined from the Dangbe phrase "ba mi ku". "Ba" means "leaf(ves)". "Ku" is the generic Ga-Dangbe term for all food of similar texture and prepared in a similar manner. Historically, banku was stored in leaves. The phrase ba mi ku simply means "ku in leaves", and has been adulterated over time into banku. There are similar tonal terms with different meanings in the Ga language, such as inku (for pomade in the Ga language), ashanku (for a variant of a plantain fritter called tatale), and many other names ending in "ku".

== Ingredients and preparation ==
The main ingredients for preparing banku are corn flour, cassava, salt and water. Banku and akple are made with similar ingredients.

Cassava is peeled, chopped and mixed with corn grains and soaked for a day. The water is poured off and the cassava and maize are milled into a smooth, fine and wet dough. The dough is then fermented for two to five days, depending on temperature.

The corn and cassava dough is mixed with water and then boiled. The mixture is stirred gradually until the slurry becomes dough-like again and is then kneaded until it is smooth. Water is added around the "dough-in-pan-island", enough to almost cover the surface. It then needs to be covered well and allowed to boil, ensuring even cooking and steaming of the dough in the covered pan. Next, the dough is kneaded with a spatula to incorporate the water into it until it is smooth.

The process is repeated with centring, watering, and kneading until the dough is soft and evenly cooked. The cooked dough is portioned into small balls.

Banku and akple are traditionally eaten with the hands. Akple is usually eaten with an okro (okra) soup known as fetri detsi among the Ewes. It can be served with soup, stew or pepper sauce with meat or fish.

== Gallery ==
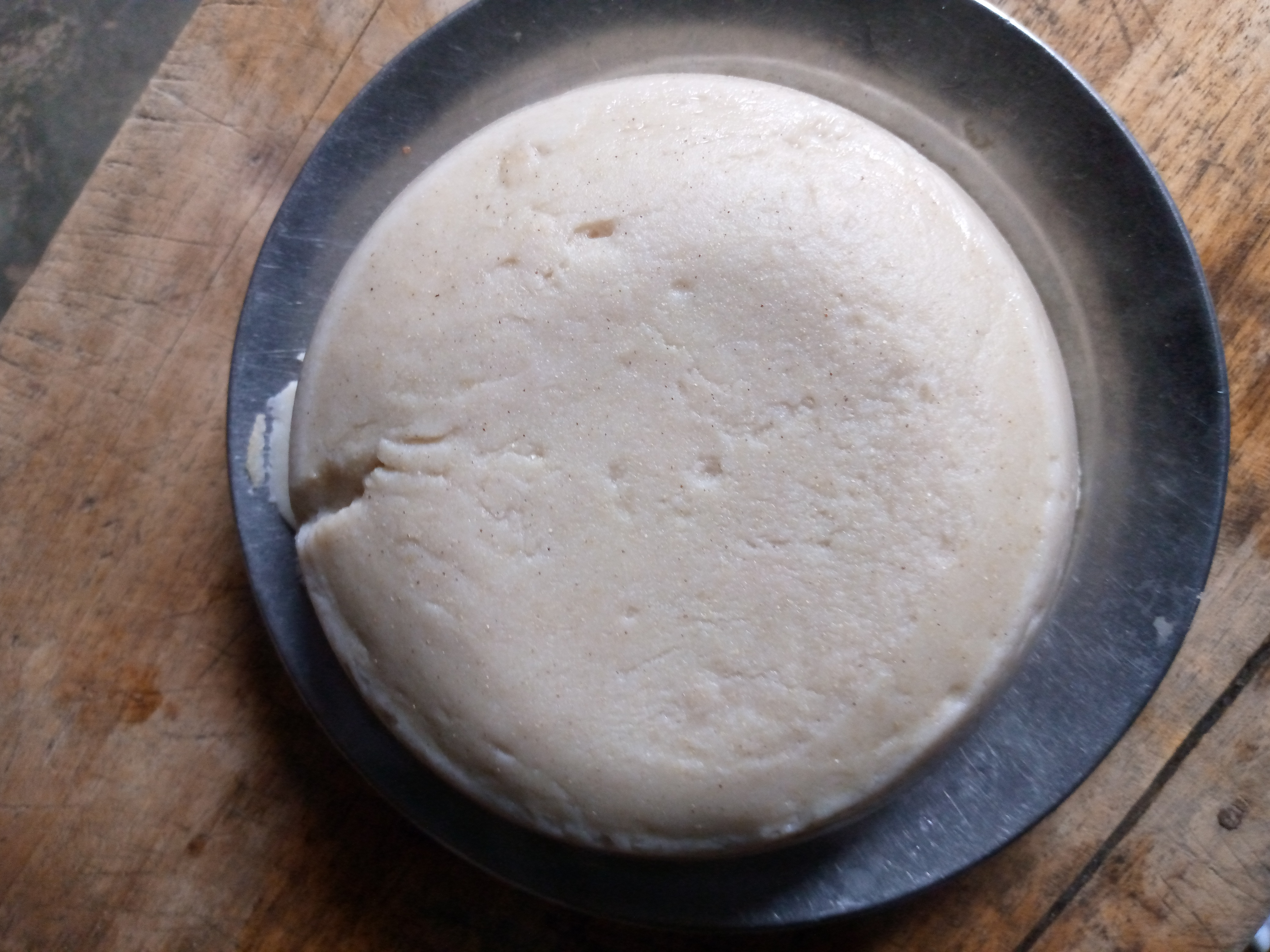
Akple

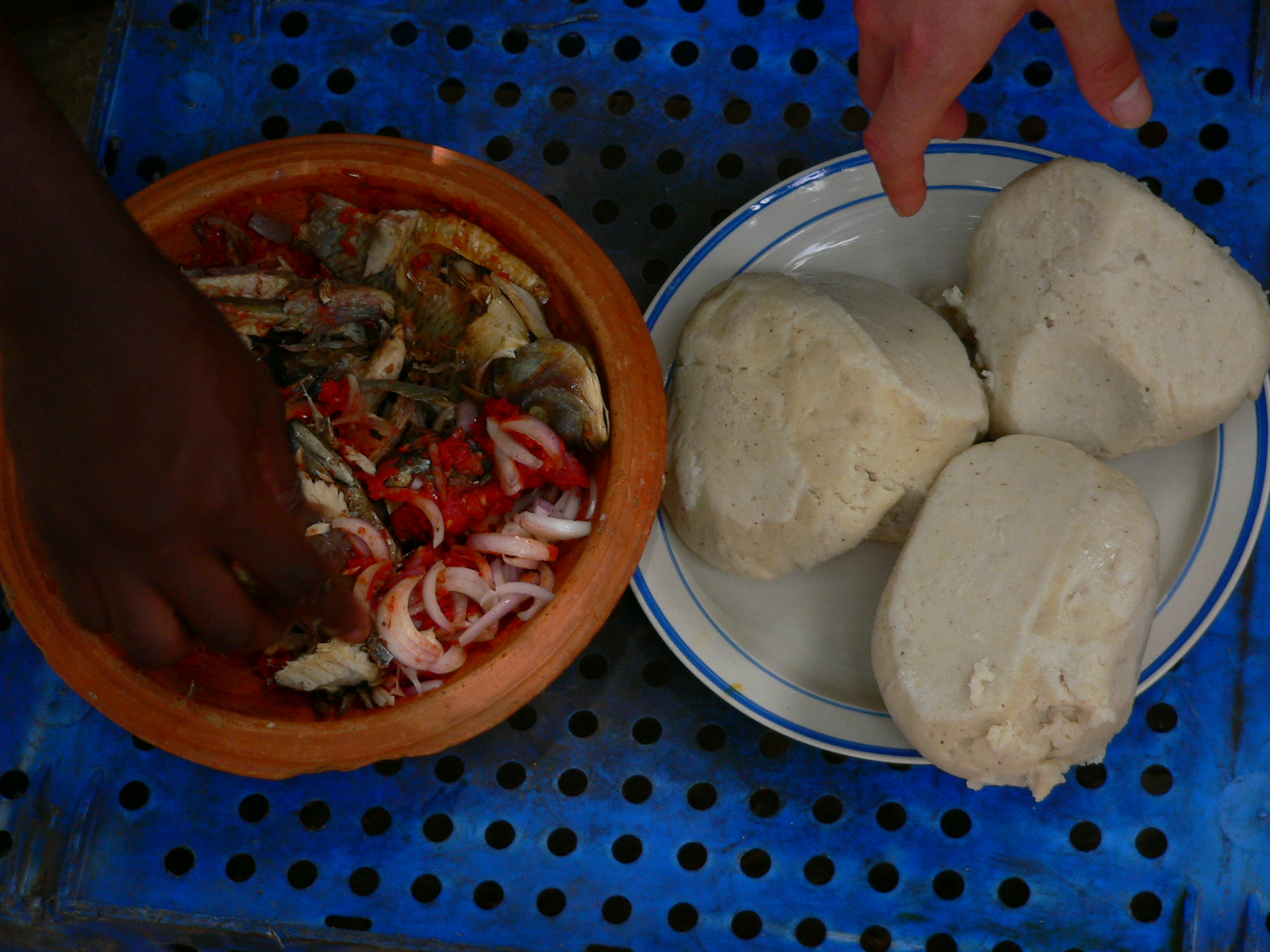
Banku and pepper

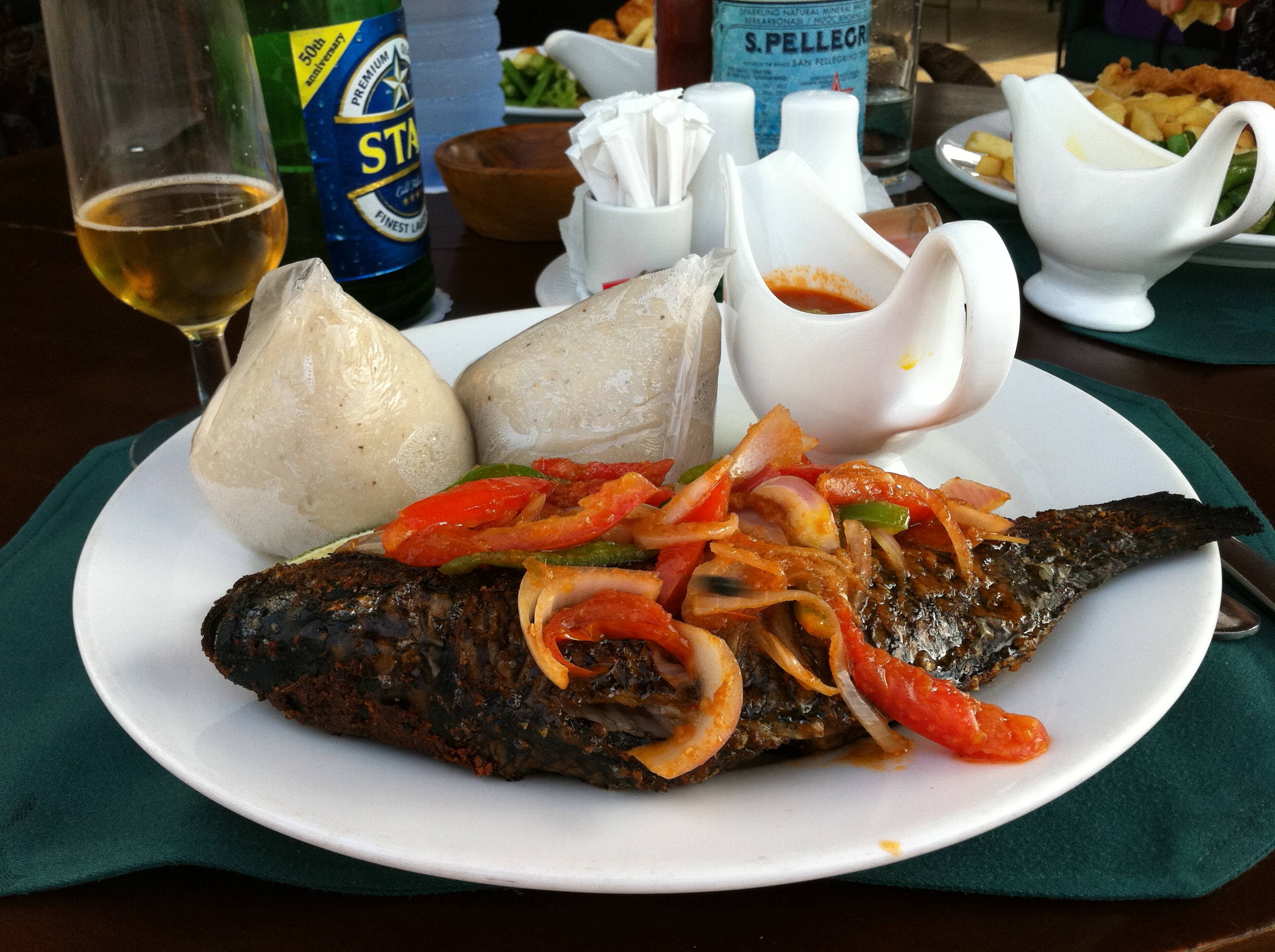
Grilled tilapia with banku

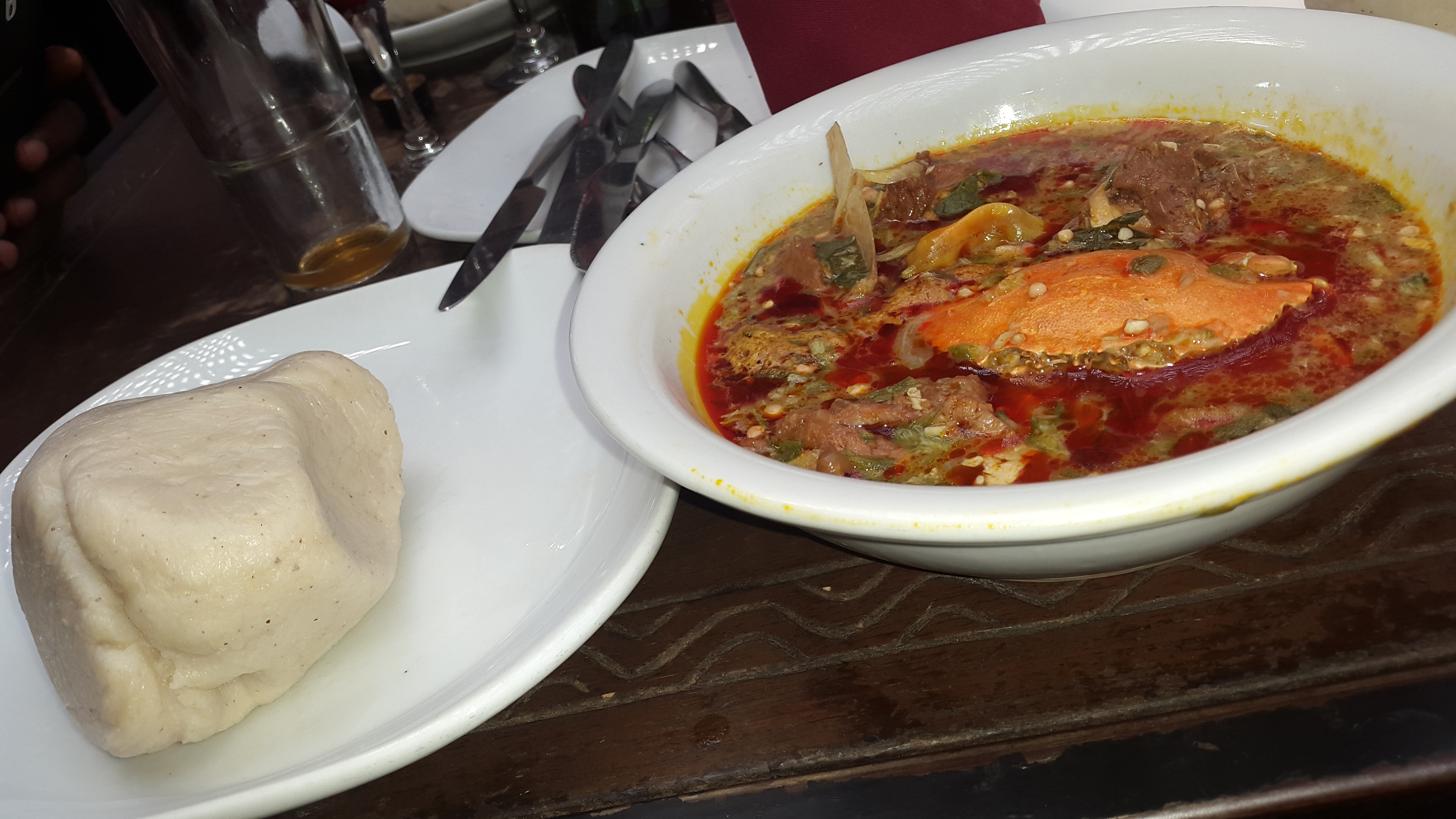
Banku with okro okra stew and crab

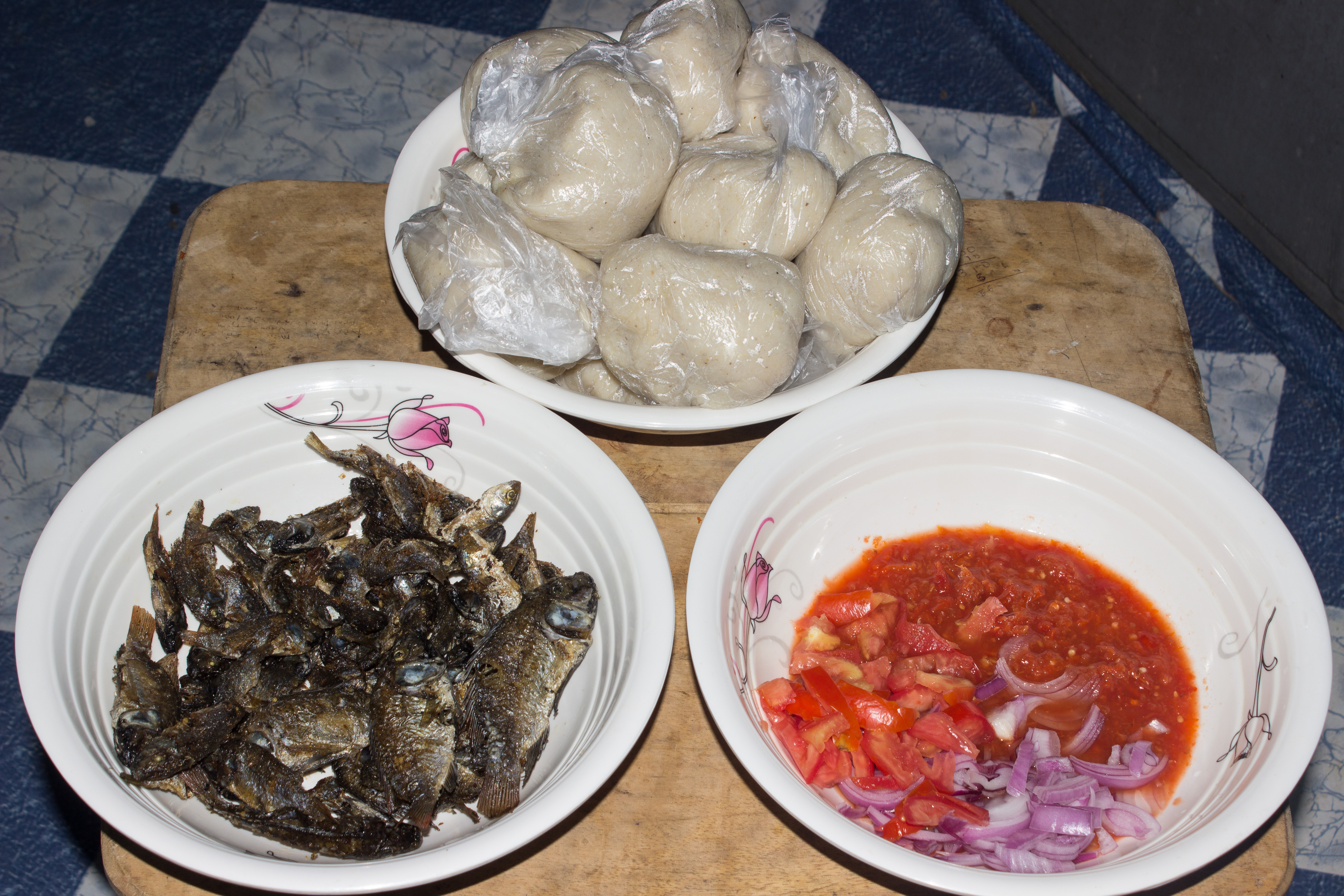
Banku with fried fish and hot pepper

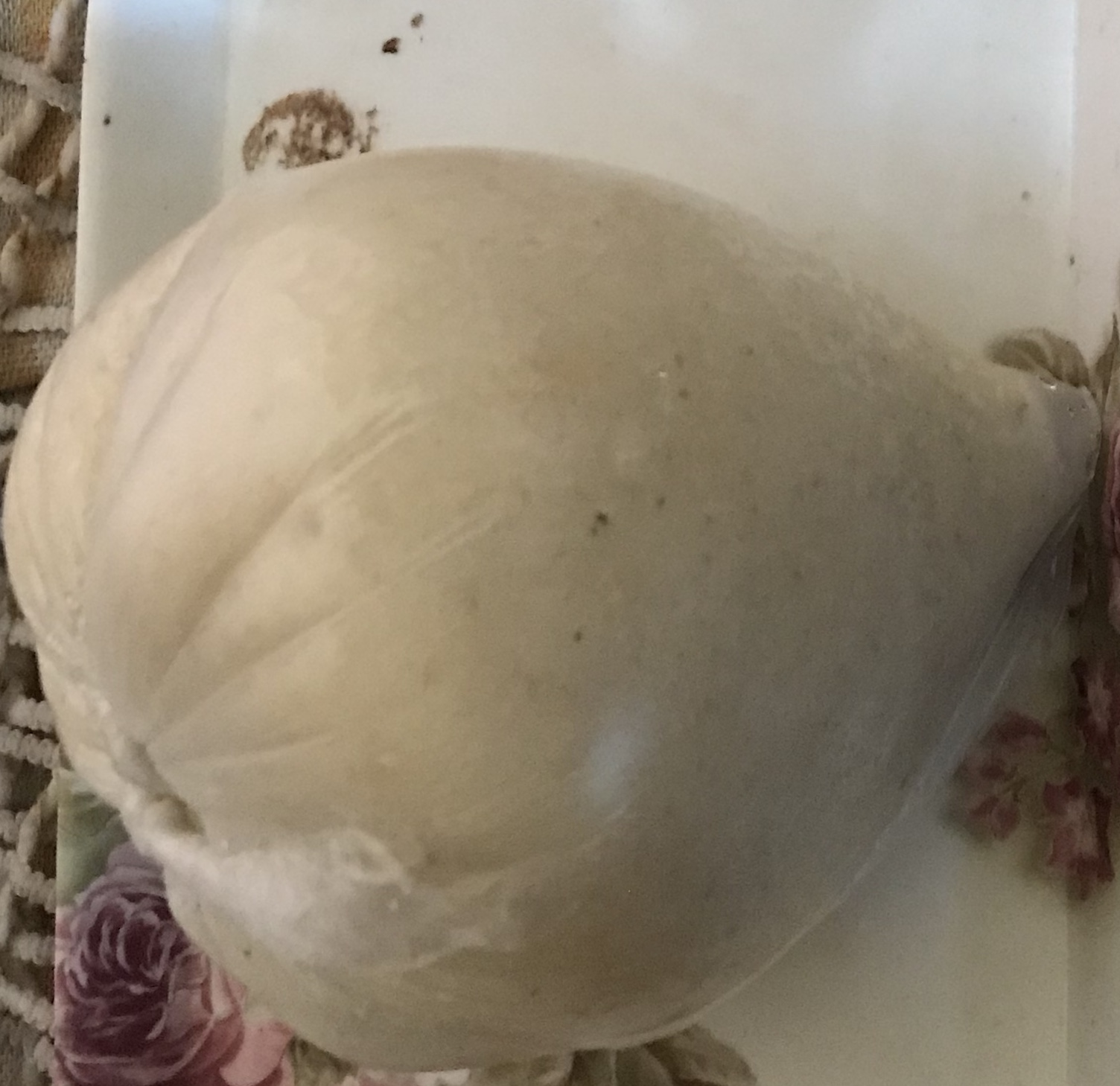
A ball of akple tied in plastic

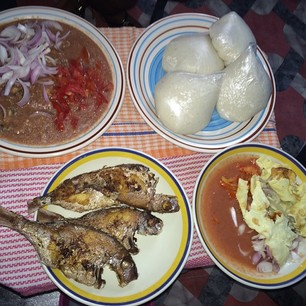
Akple (upper right) and borbi tadi

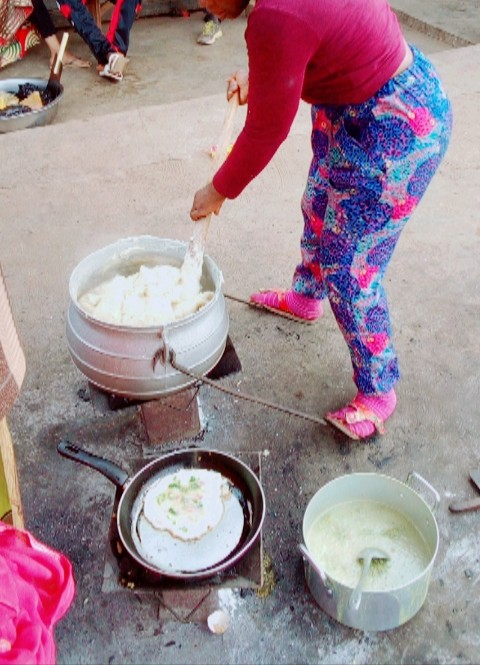
A woman preparing banku in Ghana

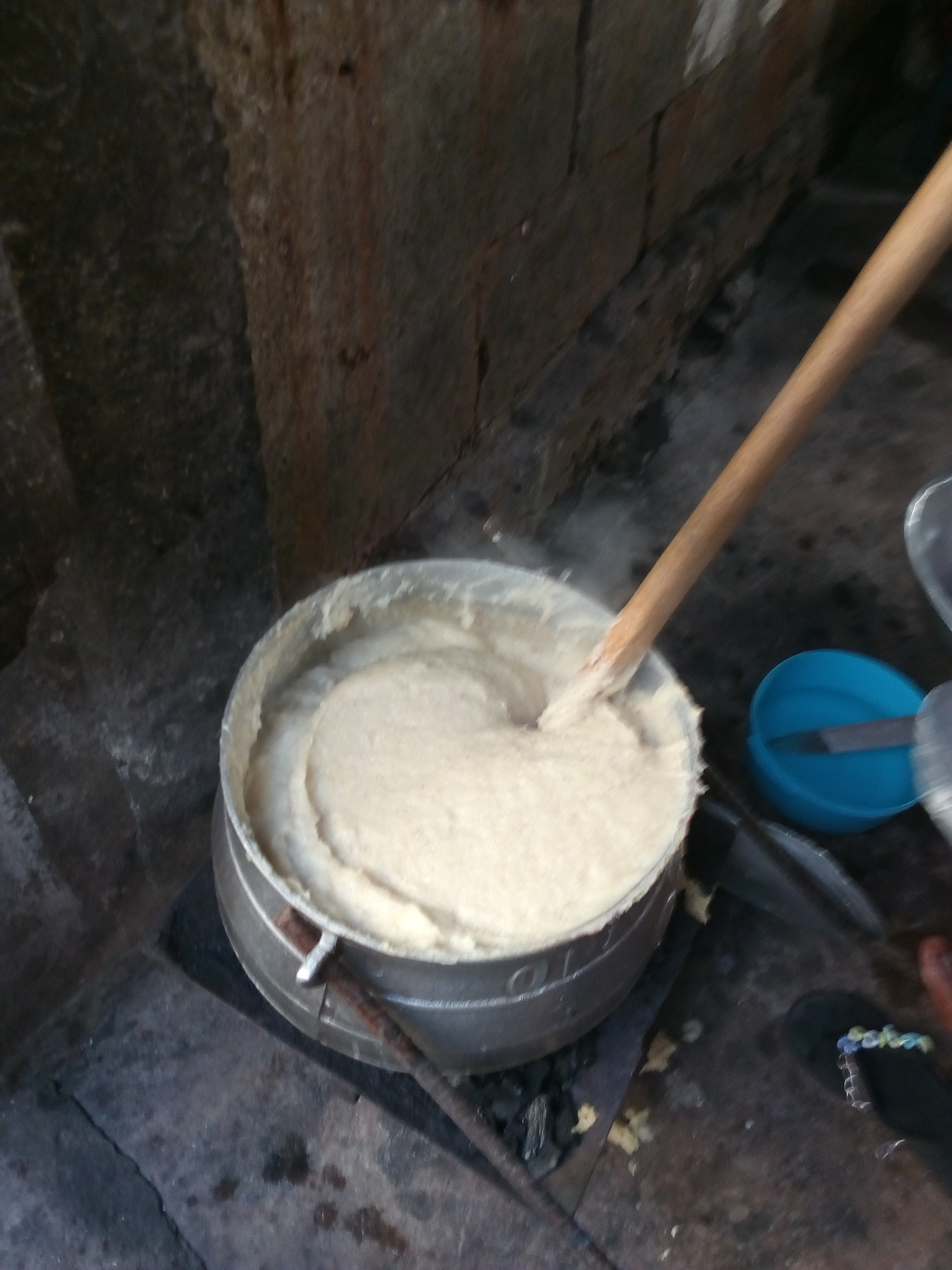
Preparing banku

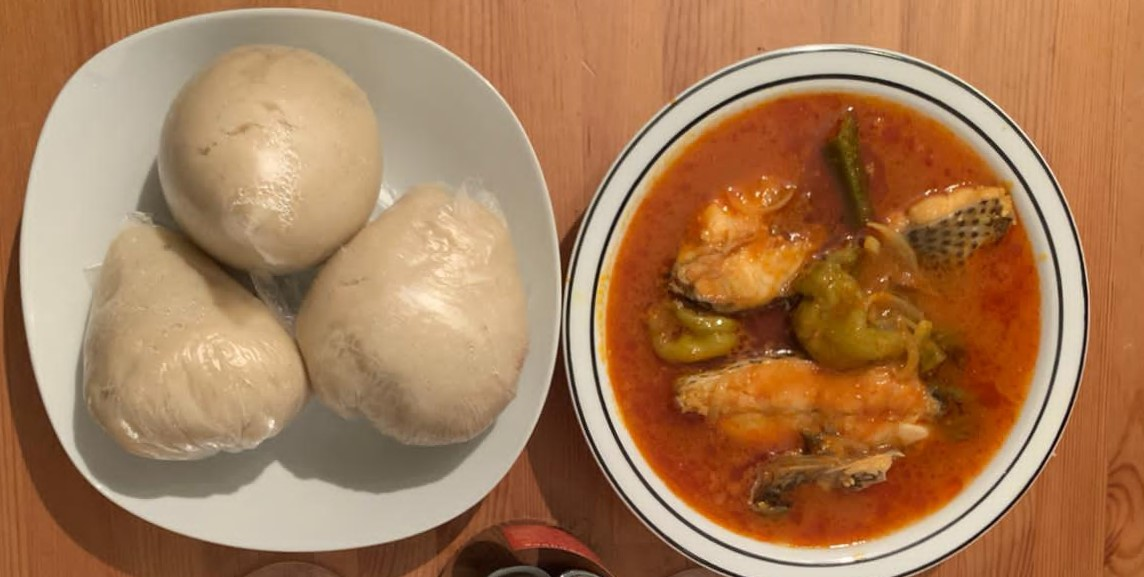
wrapped banku and light soup
