= List of Orthotylinae genera =

This is a list of 71 genera in the subfamily Orthotylinae.

== Orthotylinae genera ==
- Acaciacoris Schaffner, 1977
- Anapus Stål, 1858
- Aoplonema Knight, 1928
- Aoplonemella
- Apachemiris Carvalho and Schaffner, 1974
- Argyrocoris Van Duzee, 1912
- Ballella Knight, 1959
- Blepharidopterus Kolenati, 1845
- Brachynotocoris Reuter, 1880
- Brooksetta Kelton, 1979
- Ceratocapsus Reuter, 1876
- Ceratopidea Knight, 1968
- Coridromius Signoret, 1862
- Cyrtorhinus Fieber, 1858
- Daleapidea Knight, 1968
- Diaphnidia Uhler, 1895
- Dichaetocoris Knight, 1968
- Ephedrodoma Polhemus & Polhemus, 1984
- Fieberocapsus Carvalho and Southwood, 1955
- Hadronema Uhler, 1872
- Halticus Hahn, 1832 (fleahoppers)
- Heterocordylus Fieber, 1858
- Heterotoma Lepeletier & Serville, 1825
- Hyalochloria Reuter, 1907
- Ilnacora Reuter, 1876
- Ilnacorella Knight, 1925
- Jobertus Distant, 1893
- Kalania Kirkaldy, 1904
- Kamehameha Kirkaldy, 1902
- Koanoa Kirkaldy, 1902
- Labopella Knight, 1929
- Labopidea Uhler, 1877
- Labops Burmeister, 1835
- Lindbergocapsus Wagner, 1960
- Lopidea Uhler, 1872
- Lopidella Knight, 1925
- Loulucoris Asquith, 1995
- Malacocoris Fieber, 1858
- Mecomma Fieber, 1858
- Melanotrichus Reuter, 1875
- Melymacra Schwartz, 2004
- Microtechnites
- Myrmecophyes Fieber, 1870
- Nesidiorchestes Kirkaldy, 1902
- Nesiomiris Kirkaldy, 1902
- Noctuocoris Knight, 1923
- Oaxacacoris Schwartz and Stonedahl, 1987
- Origonema
- Orthocephalus Fieber, 1858
- Orthotylus Fieber, 1858
- Pamillia Uhler, 1887
- Paraproba Distant, 1884
- Parthenicus Reuter, 1876
- Pilophoropsidea Henry
- Pilophoropsis Poppius, 1914
- Proboscidotylus Henry, 1995
- Pseudoclerada Kirkaldy, 1902
- Pseudoloxops Kirkaldy, 1905
- Pseudopsallus Van Duzee, 1916
- Pseudoxenetus Reuter, 1909
- Renodaeus Distant, 1893
- Reuteria Puton, 1875
- Saileria Hsiao, 1945
- Sarona Kirkaldy, 1902
- Scalponotatus Kelton, 1969
- Schaffneria Knight, 1966
- Sericophanes Reuter, 1876
- Slaterocoris Wagner, 1956
- Squamocoris Knight, 1968
- Sulamita Kirkaldy, 1902
- Texocoris Schaffner, 1974
