= List of Parthenicus species =

This is a list of 75 species in the genus Parthenicus.

== Parthenicus species ==
- Parthenicus accumulus Knight, 1968
- Parthenicus albellus Knight, 1925
- Parthenicus aridus Knight, 1918
- Parthenicus atriplicis Knight, 1968
- Parthenicus aureosquamis Knight, 1925
- Parthenicus baccharidis Knight, 1925
- Parthenicus basicornis Knight, 1968
- Parthenicus becki Knight, 1968
- Parthenicus boutelouae Knight, 1968
- Parthenicus brevicornis Knight, 1968
- Parthenicus brindleyi Knight, 1968
- Parthenicus brooksi Kelton, 1980
- Parthenicus brunneus Van Duzee, 1925
- Parthenicus candidus Van Duzee, 1918
- Parthenicus cercocarpi Knight, 1968
- Parthenicus condensus Knight, 1968
- Parthenicus consperus Knight, 1968
- Parthenicus covilleae Van Duzee, 1918
- Parthenicus cowaniae Knight, 1968
- Parthenicus cuneotinctus Knight, 1925
- Parthenicus davisi Knight, 1968
- Parthenicus deleticus Knight, 1968
- Parthenicus desertus Knight, 1968
- Parthenicus discalis Van Duzee, 1925
- Parthenicus femoratus (Van Duzee, 1925)
- Parthenicus furcatus Knight, 1968
- Parthenicus fuscipilus Knight, 1968
- Parthenicus fuscosus Knight, 1968
- Parthenicus giffardi Van Duzee, 1917
- Parthenicus grex Van Duzee, 1925
- Parthenicus incurvus Knight, 1968
- Parthenicus irroratus Knight, 1968
- Parthenicus juniperi (Heidemann, 1892)
- Parthenicus knighti Henry, 1982
- Parthenicus merinoi Knight, 1968
- Parthenicus micans Knight, 1925
- Parthenicus miniopunctatus Knight, 1968
- Parthenicus muchmorei Knight, 1968
- Parthenicus multipunctatus Knight, 1968
- Parthenicus mundus Van Duzee, 1923
- Parthenicus nevadensis Knight, 1968
- Parthenicus nicholellus Knight, 1968
- Parthenicus nicholi Knight, 1925
- Parthenicus nigripunctus Knight, 1968
- Parthenicus obsoletus Knight, 1968
- Parthenicus oreades Knight, 1925
- Parthenicus pallidicollis Van Duzee, 1925
- Parthenicus pallipes Knight, 1968
- Parthenicus peregrinus (Van Duzee, 1918)
- Parthenicus picicollis Van Duzee, 1918
- Parthenicus pictus Knight, 1925
- Parthenicus pilipes Knight, 1968
- Parthenicus pinicola Knight, 1968
- Parthenicus psalliodes Reuter, 1876
- Parthenicus ribesi Knight, 1968
- Parthenicus ruber Van Duzee, 1917
- Parthenicus rubrinervis Knight, 1925
- Parthenicus rubromaculosus Knight, 1968
- Parthenicus rubropunctipes Knight, 1968
- Parthenicus rubrosignatus Knight, 1968
- Parthenicus rufiguttattus Knight, 1968
- Parthenicus rufivenosus Knight, 1925
- Parthenicus rufus Henry, 1982
- Parthenicus rufusculus Knight, 1925
- Parthenicus sabulosus Van Duzee, 1925
- Parthenicus selectus Knight, 1925
- Parthenicus soror (Van Duzee, 1917)
- Parthenicus taxodii Knight, 1941
- Parthenicus tenuis Knight, 1968
- Parthenicus thibodeaui Schwartz and Scudder, 2003
- Parthenicus trispinosus Knight, 1968
- Parthenicus utahensis Knight, 1968
- Parthenicus vaccini (Van Duzee, 1915)
- Parthenicus weemsi Henry, 1982
- Parthenicus wheeleri Henry, 2007
