= Hadronema militare =

Scientific classification
- Kingdom: Animalia
- Phylum: Arthropoda
- Class: Insecta
- Order: Hemiptera
- Suborder: Heteroptera
- Family: Miridae
- Tribe: Orthotylini
- Genus: Hadronema
- Species: H. militare

Binomial name
- Hadronema militare Uhler, 1872

Synonyms
- Hadronema militaris Uhler, 1872

Species of true bug

Hadronema militare is a species of plant bug in the family Miridae. It is found in North America.
