= Paraproba cincta =

Scientific classification
- Kingdom: Animalia
- Phylum: Arthropoda
- Class: Insecta
- Order: Hemiptera
- Suborder: Heteroptera
- Family: Miridae
- Tribe: Orthotylini
- Genus: Paraproba
- Species: P. cincta

Binomial name
- Paraproba cincta Van Duzee, 1917

Species of true bug

Paraproba cincta is a species of plant bug in the family Miridae. It is found in North America.
