= Ilnacorella sulcata =

Scientific classification
- Kingdom: Animalia
- Phylum: Arthropoda
- Class: Insecta
- Order: Hemiptera
- Suborder: Heteroptera
- Family: Miridae
- Tribe: Orthotylini
- Genus: Ilnacorella
- Species: I. sulcata

Binomial name
- Ilnacorella sulcata Knight, 1925

Species of true bug

Ilnacorella sulcata is a species of plant bug in the family Miridae. It is found in North America.
