= Paraproba hamata =

Scientific classification
- Kingdom: Animalia
- Phylum: Arthropoda
- Clade: Pancrustacea
- Class: Insecta
- Order: Hemiptera
- Suborder: Heteroptera
- Family: Miridae
- Tribe: Orthotylini
- Genus: Paraproba
- Species: P. hamata

Binomial name
- Paraproba hamata (Van Duzee, 1912)

Species of true bug

Paraproba hamata is a species of plant bug in the family Miridae. It is found in North America.
