= Lopidella flavoscuta =

Scientific classification
- Kingdom: Animalia
- Phylum: Arthropoda
- Class: Insecta
- Order: Hemiptera
- Suborder: Heteroptera
- Family: Miridae
- Tribe: Orthotylini
- Genus: Lopidella
- Species: L. flavoscuta

Binomial name
- Lopidella flavoscuta Knight, 1925

Species of true bug

Lopidella flavoscuta is a species of plant bug in the family Miridae. It is found in North America.
