= Reuteria querci =

Scientific classification
- Kingdom: Animalia
- Phylum: Arthropoda
- Class: Insecta
- Order: Hemiptera
- Suborder: Heteroptera
- Family: Miridae
- Tribe: Orthotylini
- Genus: Reuteria
- Species: R. querci

Binomial name
- Reuteria querci Knight, 1939

Species of true bug

Reuteria querci is a species of plant bug in the family Miridae. It is found in North America.
