= Slaterocoris croceipes =

Scientific classification
- Kingdom: Animalia
- Phylum: Arthropoda
- Class: Insecta
- Order: Hemiptera
- Suborder: Heteroptera
- Family: Miridae
- Tribe: Orthotylini
- Genus: Slaterocoris
- Species: S. croceipes

Binomial name
- Slaterocoris croceipes Knight, 1970

Species of true bug

Slaterocoris croceipes is a species of plant bug in the family Miridae. It is found in North America.
