= Reuteria platani =

Scientific classification
- Kingdom: Animalia
- Phylum: Arthropoda
- Class: Insecta
- Order: Hemiptera
- Suborder: Heteroptera
- Family: Miridae
- Tribe: Orthotylini
- Genus: Reuteria
- Species: R. platani

Binomial name
- Reuteria platani Knight, 1941

Species of plant bug

Reuteria platani is a species of plant bug in the family Miridae. It is found in North America.
