= Parthenicus taxodii =

Scientific classification
- Kingdom: Animalia
- Phylum: Arthropoda
- Class: Insecta
- Order: Hemiptera
- Suborder: Heteroptera
- Family: Miridae
- Tribe: Orthotylini
- Genus: Parthenicus
- Species: P. taxodii

Binomial name
- Parthenicus taxodii Knight, 1941

Species of true bug

Parthenicus taxodii is a species of plant bug in the family Miridae. It is found in North America.
