= Hadronema pictum =

Scientific classification
- Kingdom: Animalia
- Phylum: Arthropoda
- Class: Insecta
- Order: Hemiptera
- Suborder: Heteroptera
- Family: Miridae
- Tribe: Orthotylini
- Genus: Hadronema
- Species: H. pictum

Binomial name
- Hadronema pictum Uhler, 1895

Species of true bug

Hadronema pictum is a species of plant bug in the family Miridae. It is found in North America.
