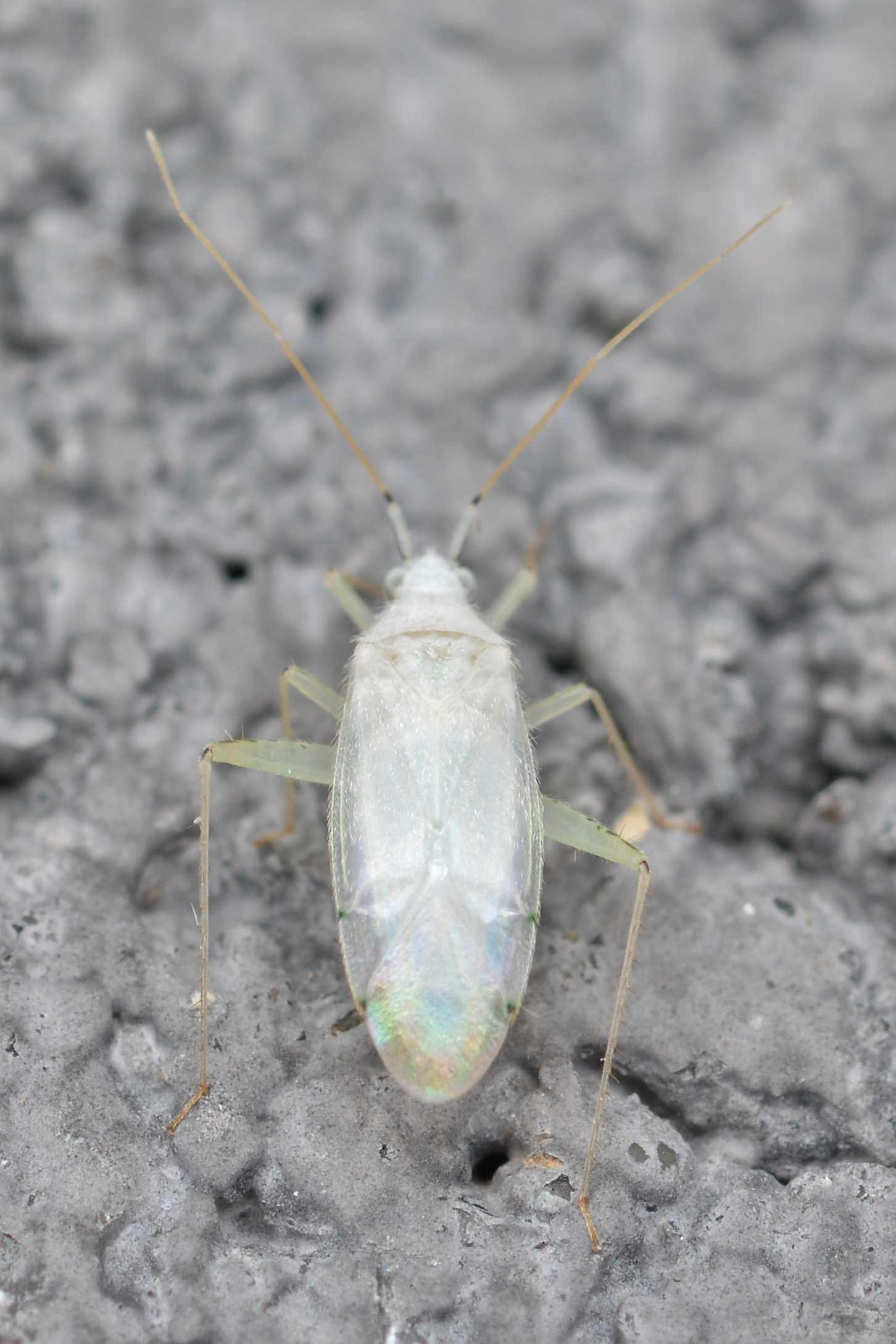

Scientific classification
- Kingdom: Animalia
- Phylum: Arthropoda
- Class: Insecta
- Order: Hemiptera
- Suborder: Heteroptera
- Family: Miridae
- Tribe: Orthotylini
- Genus: Reuteria
- Species: R. bifurcata

Binomial name
- Reuteria bifurcata Knight, 1939

= Reuteria bifurcata =

Species of true bug

Reuteria bifurcata is a species of plant bug in the family Miridae. It is found in North America.
