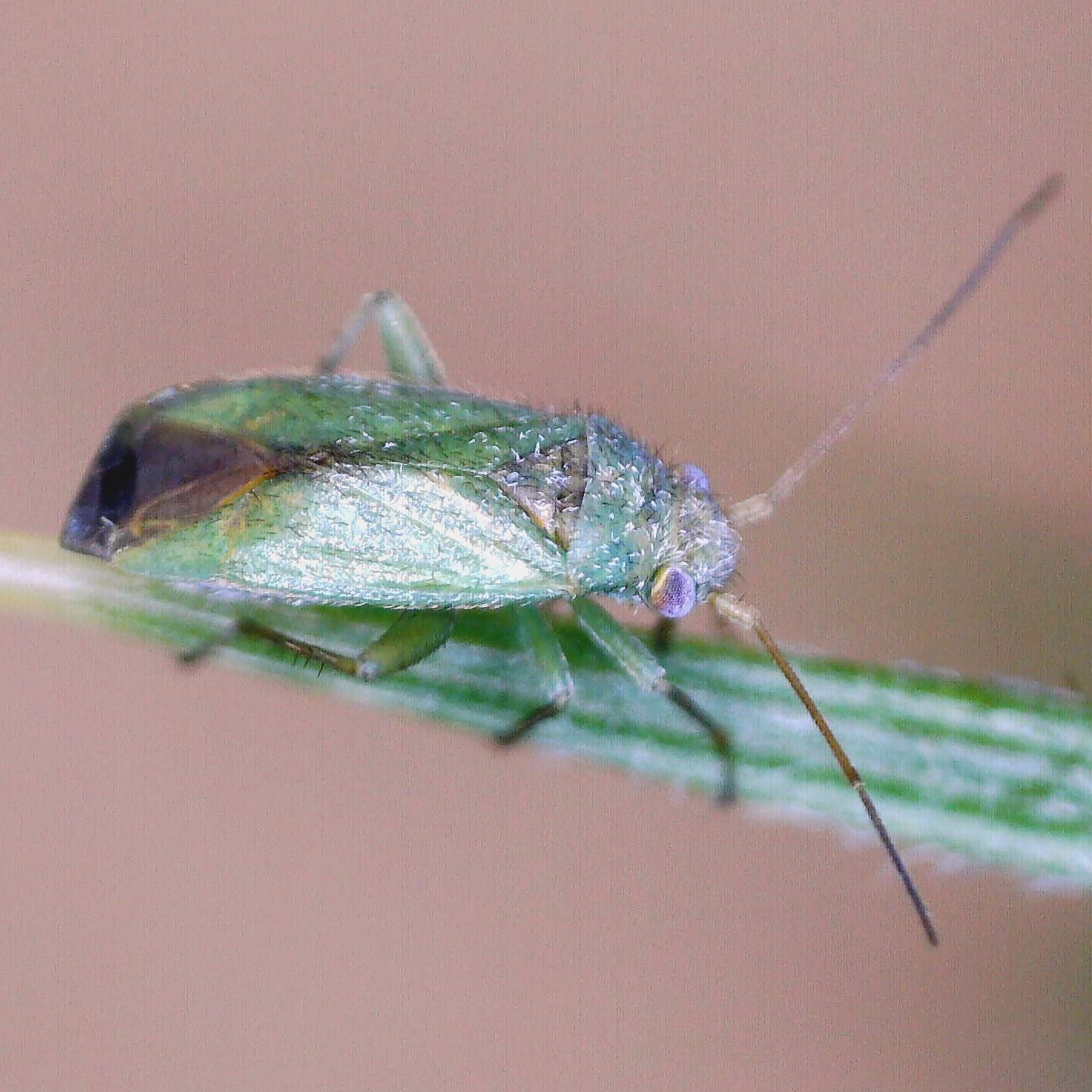
- Platycranus bicolor

Scientific classification
- Kingdom: Animalia
- Phylum: Arthropoda
- Class: Insecta
- Order: Hemiptera
- Suborder: Heteroptera
- Family: Miridae
- Subfamily: Orthotylinae
- Tribe: Orthotylini
- Genus: Platycranus; Fieber, 1870

= Platycranus =

Genus of true bugs

Platycranus is a genus of mostly European capsid bugs in the tribe Orthotylini, erected by Franz Xaver Fieber in 1858. The species P. bicolor has been recorded from the British Isles.

== Species ==
According to BioLib the following are included:

subgenus Genistocapsus Wagner, 1957

- Platycranus alkestis Linnavuori, 1999
- Platycranus bicolor (Douglas & Scott, 1868)
- Platycranus boreae Gogala, 2002
- Platycranus concii Tamanini, 1987
- Platycranus genistae Lindberg, 1948
- Platycranus jordii Günther, 2011
- Platycranus jurineae P.V. Putshkov, 1985
- Platycranus longicornis Wagner, 1955
- Platycranus metriorrhynchus Reuter, 1883
- Platycranus minutus Wagner, 1955
- Platycranus orientalis Linnavuori, 1965
- Platycranus pictus Wagner, 1963
- Platycranus remanei Wagner, 1955
- Platycranus rumelicus Simov, 2006
- Platycranus wagneri Carapezza, 1997

subgenus Platycranus Fieber, 1870

- Platycranus eckerleini Wagner, 1962
- Platycranus erberi Fieber, 1870 - type species
- Platycranus hartigi Wagner, 1951
- Platycranus jordanicus Linnavuori, 1984
- Platycranus lindbergi Wagner, 1954
- Platycranus putoni Reuter, 1879
