= Malacocoris chlorizans =

Scientific classification
- Domain: Eukaryota
- Kingdom: Animalia
- Phylum: Arthropoda
- Class: Insecta
- Order: Hemiptera
- Suborder: Heteroptera
- Family: Miridae
- Genus: Malacocoris
- Species: M. chlorizans

Binomial name
- Malacocoris chlorizans (Panzer, 1794)

Species of true bug

Malacocoris chlorizans (commonly known as delicate apple capsid) is a species of plant bugs belonging to the family Miridae, subfamily Orthotylinae.

== Description ==
The species is green coloured and is 3–4 millimetres (0.12–0.16 in) long.

== Distribution ==
It is found in Europe (mainly absent from Albania, Azores, Canary Islands, Cyprus, Faroe Islands, Iceland, Liechtenstein, Madeira, Malta and North Macedonia). and east to the Caspian Sea.

== Ecology ==
Malacocoris chlorizans is found in deciduous trees, especially in hazel where it feeds on mites and aphids. Adults fly from May to October.
