= Pseudopsallus anograe =

Scientific classification
- Kingdom: Animalia
- Phylum: Arthropoda
- Class: Insecta
- Order: Hemiptera
- Suborder: Heteroptera
- Family: Miridae
- Tribe: Orthotylini
- Genus: Pseudopsallus
- Species: P. anograe

Binomial name
- Pseudopsallus anograe Knight, 1930

Species of true bug

Pseudopsallus anograe is a species of plant bug in the family Miridae. It is found in North America.
