= Pseudopsallus sericatus =

Scientific classification
- Kingdom: Animalia
- Phylum: Arthropoda
- Class: Insecta
- Order: Hemiptera
- Suborder: Heteroptera
- Family: Miridae
- Tribe: Orthotylini
- Genus: Pseudopsallus
- Species: P. sericatus

Binomial name
- Pseudopsallus sericatus (Uhler, 1895)

Species of true bug

Pseudopsallus sericatus is a species of plant bug in the family Miridae. It is found in North America.
