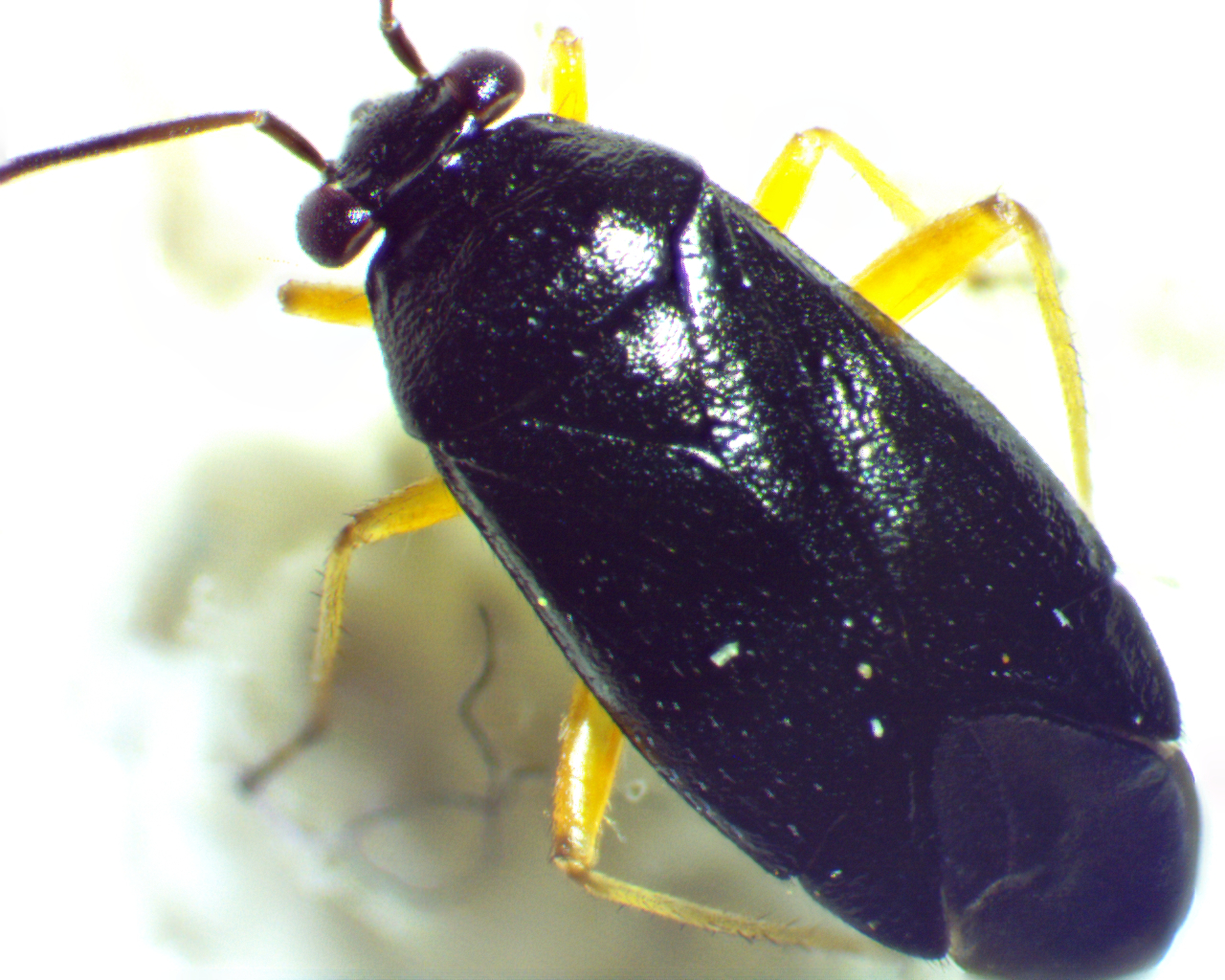

Scientific classification
- Kingdom: Animalia
- Phylum: Arthropoda
- Class: Insecta
- Order: Hemiptera
- Suborder: Heteroptera
- Family: Miridae
- Tribe: Orthotylini
- Genus: Slaterocoris
- Species: S. pallipes

Binomial name
- Slaterocoris pallipes (Knight, 1926)

= Slaterocoris pallipes =

Species of true bug

Slaterocoris pallipes is a species of plant bug in the family Miridae. It is found in North America.
