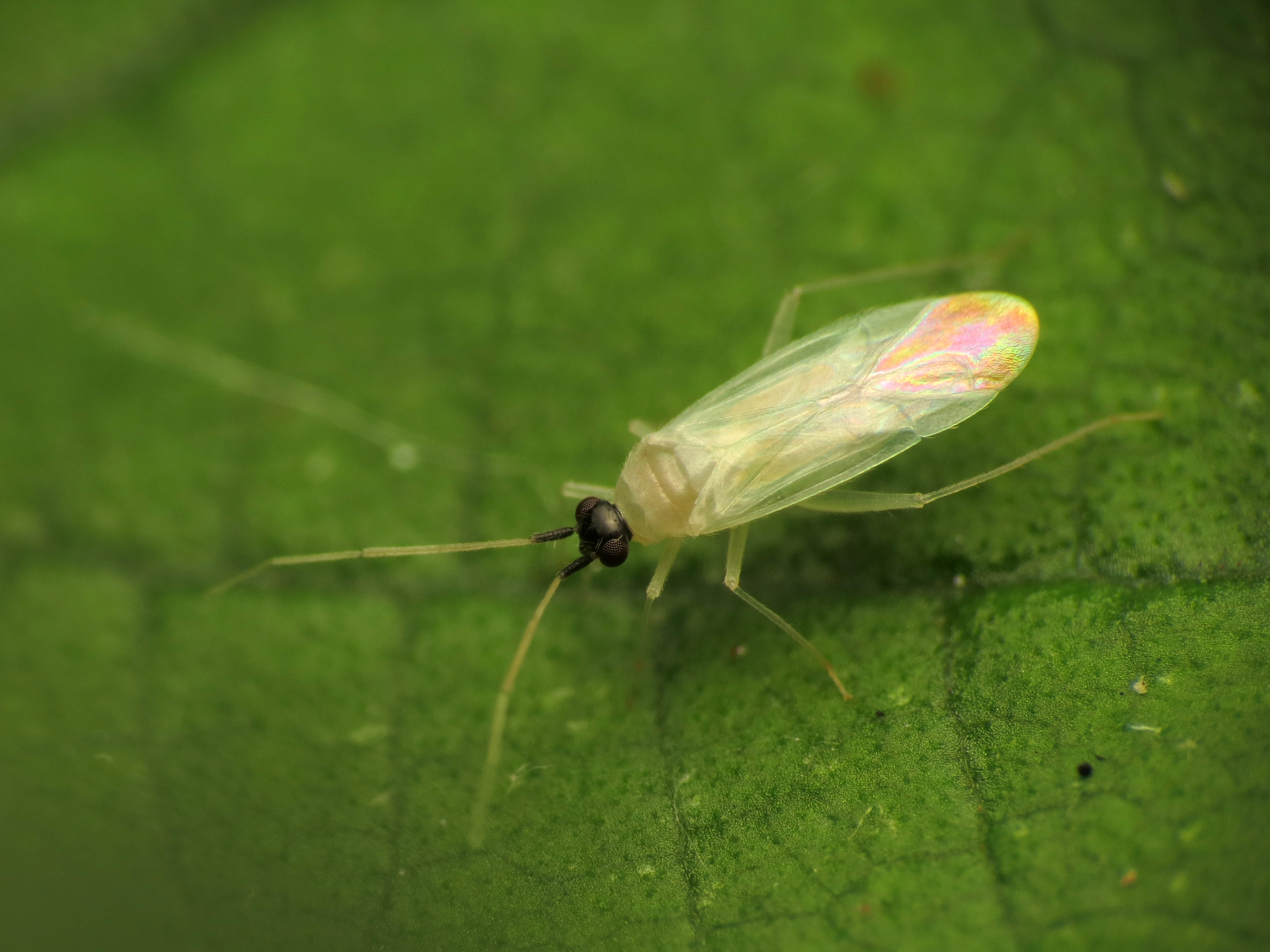

Scientific classification
- Kingdom: Animalia
- Phylum: Arthropoda
- Class: Insecta
- Order: Hemiptera
- Suborder: Heteroptera
- Family: Miridae
- Tribe: Orthotylini
- Genus: Paraproba
- Species: P. capitata

Binomial name
- Paraproba capitata (Van Duzee, 1912)

= Paraproba capitata =

Species of true bug

Paraproba capitata is a species of plant bug in the family Miridae. It is found in North America.
