= Heterocordylus malinus =

Scientific classification
- Kingdom: Animalia
- Phylum: Arthropoda
- Class: Insecta
- Order: Hemiptera
- Suborder: Heteroptera
- Family: Miridae
- Tribe: Orthotylini
- Genus: Heterocordylus
- Species: H. malinus

Binomial name
- Heterocordylus malinus Slingerland, 1909

Species of true bug

Heterocordylus malinus is a species of plant bug in the family Miridae. It is found in North America.
