= Heterotoma =

Heterotoma may refer to:

- Heterotoma (bug), a genus of bug from the family Miridae
- Heterotoma (plant), a genus of Mexican spurred lobelias, whose members are sometimes classified in Lobelia
