= Pseudopsallus puberus =

Scientific classification
- Kingdom: Animalia
- Phylum: Arthropoda
- Class: Insecta
- Order: Hemiptera
- Suborder: Heteroptera
- Family: Miridae
- Tribe: Orthotylini
- Genus: Pseudopsallus
- Species: P. puberus

Binomial name
- Pseudopsallus puberus (Uhler, 1894)

Species of true bug

Pseudopsallus puberus is a species of plant bug in the family Miridae. It is found in Central America and North America.
