= Slaterocoris breviatus =

Scientific classification
- Kingdom: Animalia
- Phylum: Arthropoda
- Clade: Pancrustacea
- Class: Insecta
- Order: Hemiptera
- Suborder: Heteroptera
- Family: Miridae
- Tribe: Orthotylini
- Genus: Slaterocoris
- Species: S. breviatus

Binomial name
- Slaterocoris breviatus (Knight, 1938)

Species of true bug

Slaterocoris breviatus is a species of plant bug in the family Miridae.
