= Brooksetta althaeae =

Scientific classification
- Kingdom: Animalia
- Phylum: Arthropoda
- Class: Insecta
- Order: Hemiptera
- Suborder: Heteroptera
- Family: Miridae
- Tribe: Orthotylini
- Genus: Brooksetta
- Species: B. althaeae

Binomial name
- Brooksetta althaeae (Hussey, 1924)

Species of true bug

Brooksetta althaeae, the hollyhock plant bug, is a species of plant bug in the family Miridae. It is found in North America.
