= Parthenicus weemsi =

Scientific classification
- Kingdom: Animalia
- Phylum: Arthropoda
- Class: Insecta
- Order: Hemiptera
- Suborder: Heteroptera
- Family: Miridae
- Tribe: Orthotylini
- Genus: Parthenicus
- Species: P. weemsi

Binomial name
- Parthenicus weemsi Henry, 1982

Species of true bug

Parthenicus weemsi is a species of plant bug in the family Miridae. It is found in North America.
