= Saileria irrorata =

Scientific classification
- Kingdom: Animalia
- Phylum: Arthropoda
- Class: Insecta
- Order: Hemiptera
- Suborder: Heteroptera
- Family: Miridae
- Tribe: Orthotylini
- Genus: Saileria
- Species: S. irrorata

Binomial name
- Saileria irrorata Henry, 1976

Species of true bug

Saileria irrorata is a species of plant bug in the family Miridae. It is found in North America.
