= Pseudopsallus angularis =

Scientific classification
- Kingdom: Animalia
- Phylum: Arthropoda
- Class: Insecta
- Order: Hemiptera
- Suborder: Heteroptera
- Family: Miridae
- Tribe: Orthotylini
- Genus: Pseudopsallus
- Species: P. angularis

Binomial name
- Pseudopsallus angularis (Uhler, 1894)

Synonyms
- Macrotylus angularis Uhler, 1894

Species of true bug

Pseudopsallus angularis is a species of plant bug in the family Miridae. It is found in Central America and North America.
