= Hadronemidea =

Scientific classification
- Kingdom: Animalia
- Phylum: Arthropoda
- Class: Insecta
- Order: Hemiptera
- Suborder: Heteroptera
- Family: Miridae
- Subfamily: Orthotylinae
- Tribe: Orthotylini
- Genus: Hadronemidea; Reuter, 1908

species
- see text

Genus of true bugs

Hadronemidea is a genus of plant bugs in the family Miridae.

== Species ==
- Hadronemidea echinata (Gruetzmacher & Schaffner, 1977)
- Hadronemidea esau Reuter, 1908
