= Ilnacora malina =

Scientific classification
- Kingdom: Animalia
- Phylum: Arthropoda
- Class: Insecta
- Order: Hemiptera
- Suborder: Heteroptera
- Family: Miridae
- Tribe: Orthotylini
- Genus: Ilnacora
- Species: I. malina

Binomial name
- Ilnacora malina (Uhler, 1877)

Species of true bug

Ilnacora malina is a species of plant bug in the family Miridae. It is found in North America.
