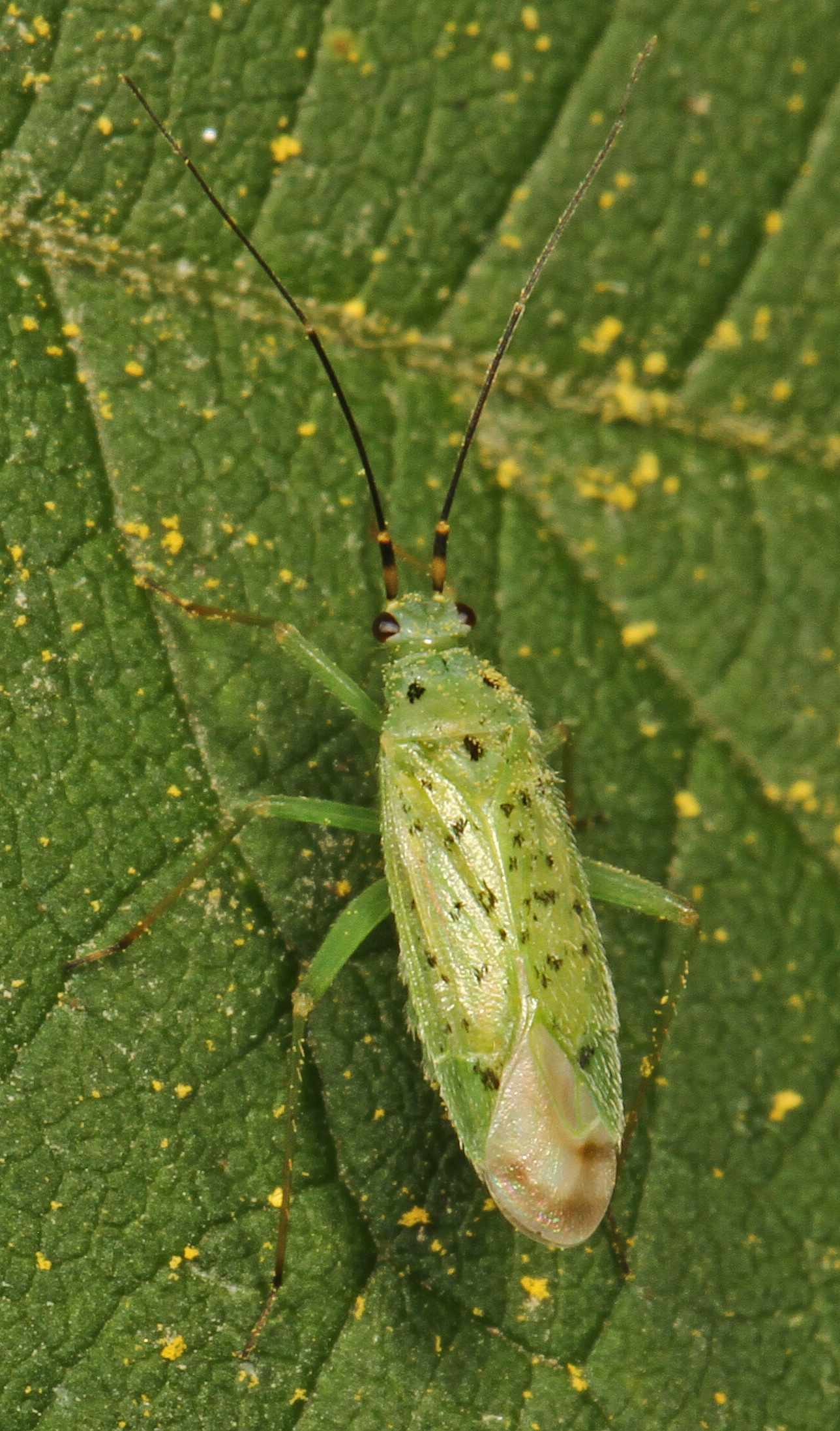

Scientific classification
- Kingdom: Animalia
- Phylum: Arthropoda
- Class: Insecta
- Order: Hemiptera
- Suborder: Heteroptera
- Family: Miridae
- Tribe: Orthotylini
- Genus: Ilnacora
- Species: I. stalii

Binomial name
- Ilnacora stalii Reuter, 1876

= Ilnacora stalii =

Species of true bug

Ilnacora stalii is a species of plant bug in the family Miridae. It is found in North America.
