= Slaterocoris ambrosiae =

Scientific classification
- Kingdom: Animalia
- Phylum: Arthropoda
- Class: Insecta
- Order: Hemiptera
- Suborder: Heteroptera
- Family: Miridae
- Tribe: Orthotylini
- Genus: Slaterocoris
- Species: S. ambrosiae

Binomial name
- Slaterocoris ambrosiae (Knight, 1938)

Species of true bug

Slaterocoris ambrosiae is a species of plant bug in the family Miridae. It is found in Central America and North America.
