= Pseudopsallus atriseta =

Scientific classification
- Kingdom: Animalia
- Phylum: Arthropoda
- Class: Insecta
- Order: Hemiptera
- Suborder: Heteroptera
- Family: Miridae
- Tribe: Orthotylini
- Genus: Pseudopsallus
- Species: P. atriseta

Binomial name
- Pseudopsallus atriseta (Van Duzee, 1916)

Species of true bug

Pseudopsallus atriseta is a species of plant bug in the family Miridae. It is found in Central America and North America.
