= Parthenicus oreades =

Scientific classification
- Kingdom: Animalia
- Phylum: Arthropoda
- Class: Insecta
- Order: Hemiptera
- Suborder: Heteroptera
- Family: Miridae
- Tribe: Orthotylini
- Genus: Parthenicus
- Species: P. oreades

Binomial name
- Parthenicus oreades Knight, 1925

Species of true bug

Parthenicus oreades is a species of plant bug in the family Miridae. It is found in North America. . Described by H.H. Knight in 1925, these bugs are known for having conspicuous red flecks on the clavus and corium, along with golden, scale-like hairs. They are relatively small insects, with males measuring approximately 3.7 mm and females 3.3 mm.
