= Lopidella =

Scientific classification
- Kingdom: Animalia
- Phylum: Arthropoda
- Clade: Pancrustacea
- Class: Insecta
- Order: Hemiptera
- Suborder: Heteroptera
- Family: Miridae
- Subfamily: Orthotylinae
- Tribe: Orthotylini
- Genus: Lopidella; Knight, 1925

Genus of true bugs

Lopidella is a genus of plant bugs in the family Miridae. There are about five described species in Lopidella.

== Species ==
These five species belong to the genus Lopidella:

- Lopidella birama Knight, 1965
- Lopidella flavoscuta Knight, 1925
- Lopidella knighti Schaffner, 1969
- Lopidella luteicollis Knight, 1965
- Lopidella oaxacensis Schaffner, 1969
