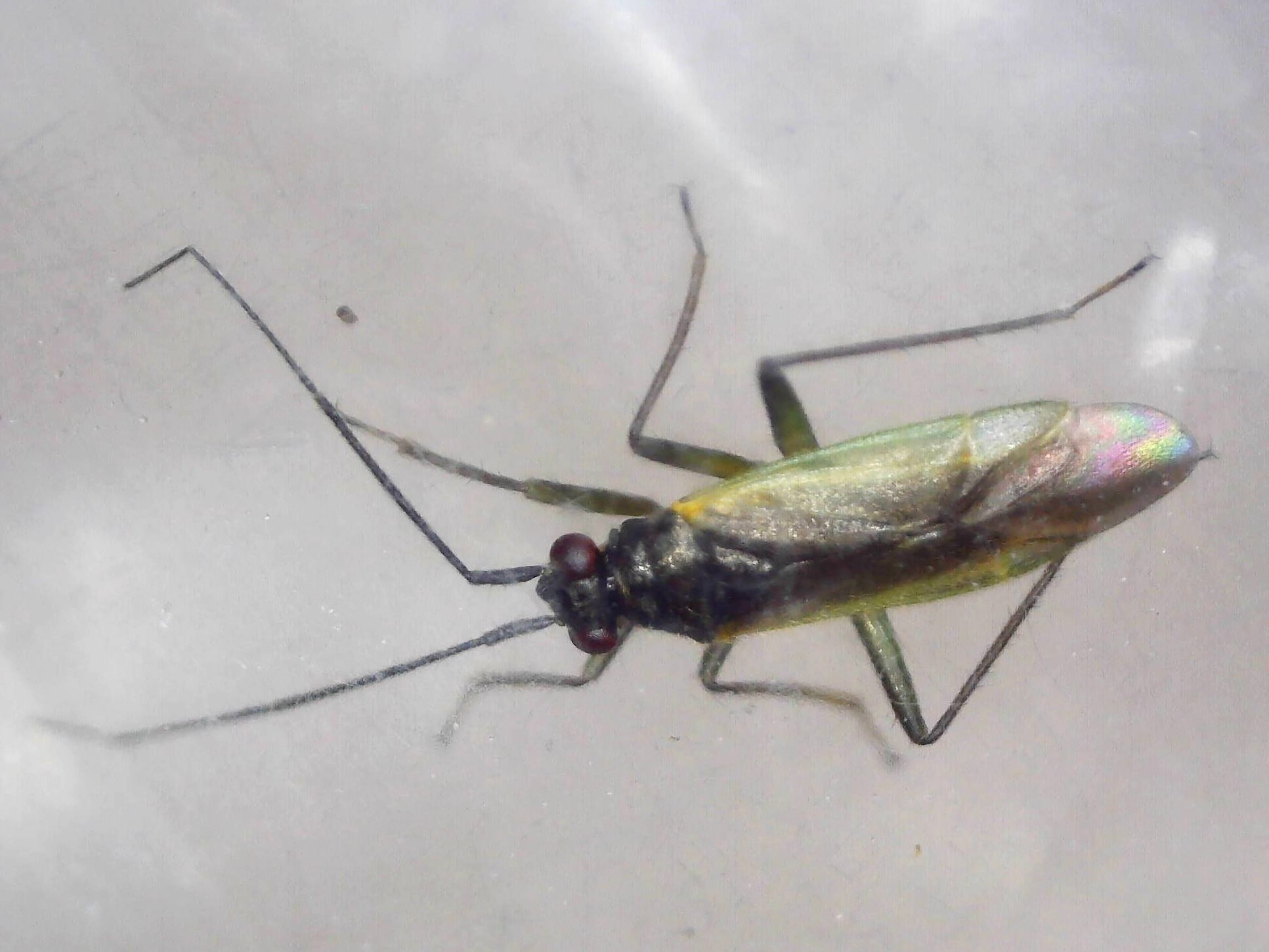

Scientific classification
- Kingdom: Animalia
- Phylum: Arthropoda
- Class: Insecta
- Order: Hemiptera
- Suborder: Heteroptera
- Family: Miridae
- Genus: Cyrtorhinus
- Species: C. caricis

Binomial name
- Cyrtorhinus caricis (Fallén, 1807)

Synonyms
- Capsus caricis Meyer-Dür, 1843; Capsus elegantulus (Meyer-Dür, 1843); Cyrtorhinus elegantulus Fallén, 1807

= Cyrtorhinus caricis =

Species of true bug

Cyrtorhinus caricis is a species of plant bug in the family Miridae. It is found in Europe except the far South and across the Palearctic to Siberia, China, Korea Japan and North America.

== Biology ==
C.caricis is associated with Scirpus, Schoenoplectus, Carex, Juncus and Typha
