= Saileria =

Scientific classification
- Kingdom: Animalia
- Phylum: Arthropoda
- Clade: Pancrustacea
- Class: Insecta
- Order: Hemiptera
- Suborder: Heteroptera
- Family: Miridae
- Subfamily: Orthotylinae
- Tribe: Orthotylini
- Genus: Saileria; Hsiao, 1945

Genus of true bugs

Saileria is a genus of plant bugs in the family Miridae. There are about nine described species in Saileria.

== Species ==
These nine species belong to the genus Saileria:

- Saileria almeidai (Carvalho, 1946)
- Saileria bella (Van Duzee, 1916)
- Saileria carmelitana Carvalho, 1990
- Saileria compsus (Reuter, 1907)
- Saileria fluminensis Carvalho, 1990
- Saileria irrorata Henry, 1976
- Saileria mexicana Carvalho, 1985
- Saileria serrana Carvalho, 1985
- Saileria sulina Carvalho, 1989
