= Aoplonemella =

Scientific classification
- Kingdom: Animalia
- Phylum: Arthropoda
- Class: Insecta
- Order: Hemiptera
- Suborder: Heteroptera
- Family: Miridae
- Subfamily: Orthotylinae
- Tribe: Orthotylini
- Genus: Aoplonemella; Forero, 2008
- Species: A. festiva

Binomial name
- Aoplonemella festiva (Van Duzee, 1910)

Synonyms
- Hadronema festiva Van Duzee, 1910

Species of true bugs

Aoplonemella is a genus of true bugs in the family Miridae, containing a single known species, Aoplonemella festiva.
