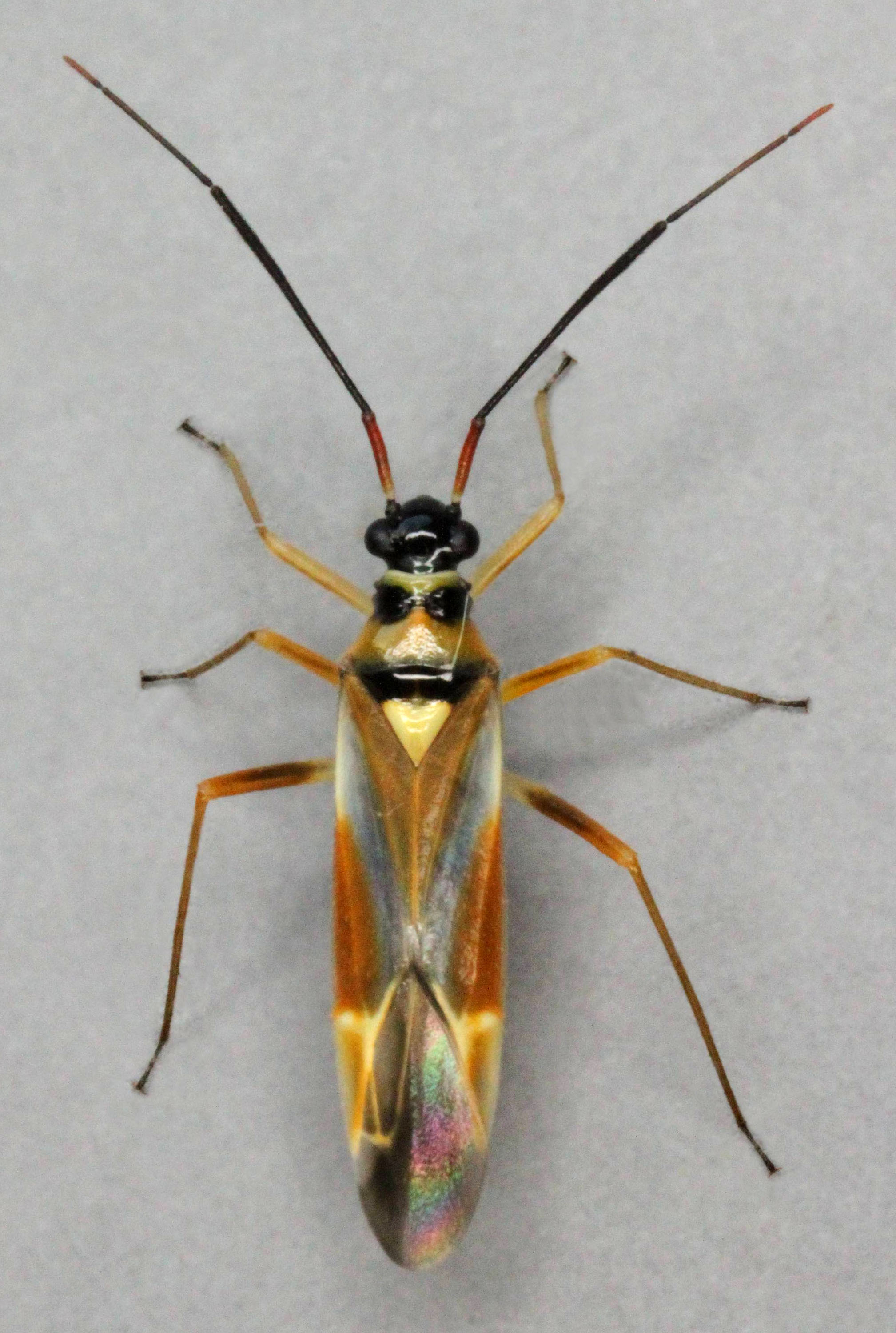
- Cyllecoris histrionius Bala, North Wales

Scientific classification
- Kingdom: Animalia
- Phylum: Arthropoda
- Class: Insecta
- Order: Hemiptera
- Suborder: Heteroptera
- Family: Miridae
- Genus: Cyllecoris
- Species: C. histrionius

Binomial name
- Cyllecoris histrionius (Linnaeus, 1767)

= Cyllecoris histrionius =

Species of true bug

Cyllecoris histrionius is a species of bug in Miridae family that can be found in the British Isles, Iceland, Western, Eastern, and Central Europe. and also in North Africa and east across Asia Minor to the Caucasus.The species have strikingly marked and elongated body, and have a large black pronotum that is narrowed at the front and is of yellowish-white colour. The eggs hatch in spring after they overwinter for a bit. The species hatch as bluish-green coloured larvae. Adults fly from May to July and could be found on oaks feeding on small insects such as aphids and bark flies.
