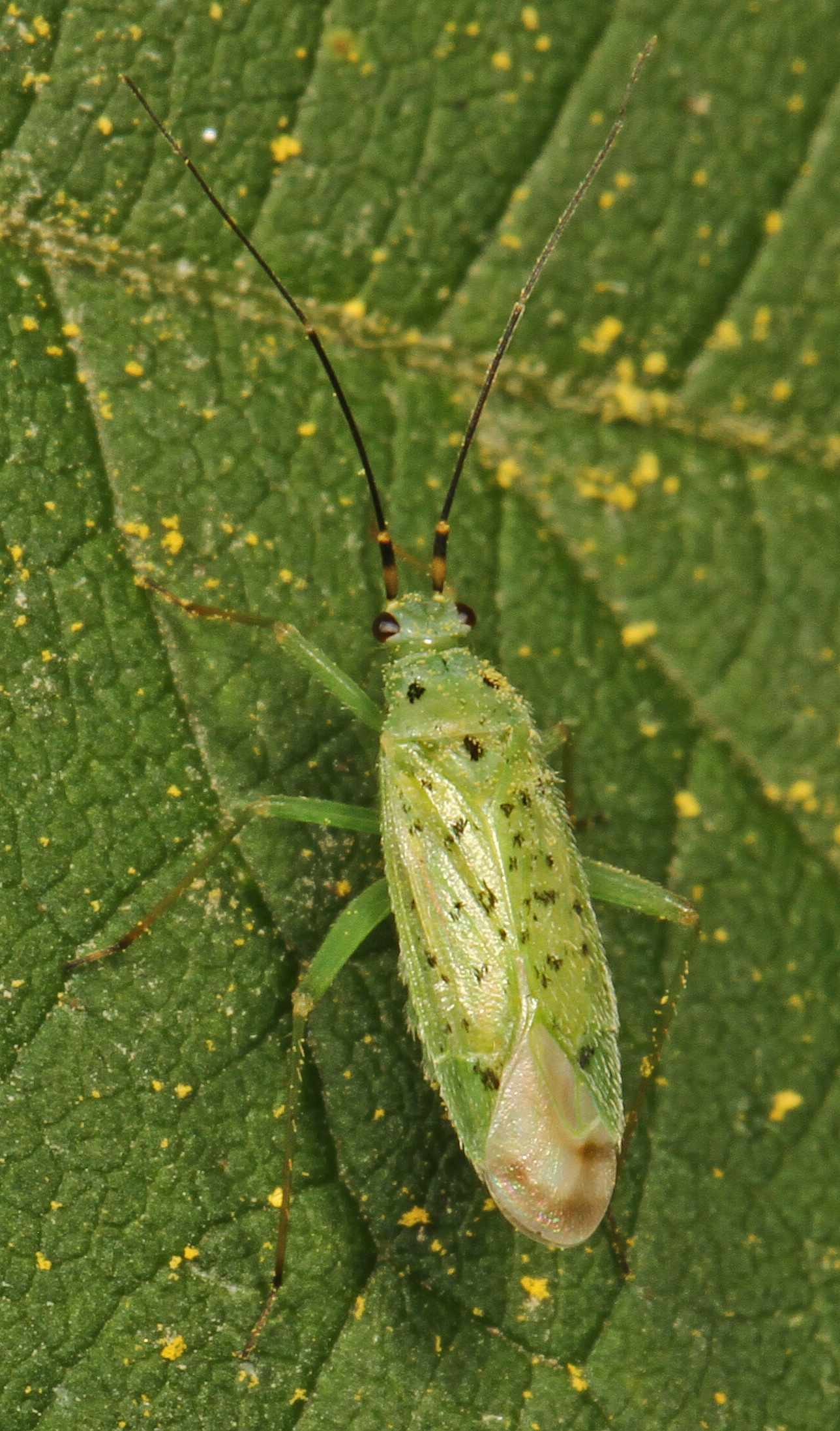
- Ilnacora stalii

Scientific classification
- Kingdom: Animalia
- Phylum: Arthropoda
- Clade: Pancrustacea
- Class: Insecta
- Order: Hemiptera
- Suborder: Heteroptera
- Family: Miridae
- Subfamily: Orthotylinae
- Tribe: Orthotylini
- Genus: Ilnacora; Reuter, 1876

Synonyms
- Corinala Reuter, 1876; Sthenarops Uhler, 1877

= Ilnacora =

Genus of true bugs

Ilnacora is a genus of plant bugs in the family Miridae. There are more than 20 described species in Ilnacora.

== Species ==
These 25 species belong to the genus Ilnacora:

- Ilnacora albifrons Knight, 1963
- Ilnacora arizonae Knight, 1963
- Ilnacora arnaudi Carvalho, 1986
- Ilnacora chihuahuaensis Knight & Schaffner, 1976
- Ilnacora chloris (Uhler, 1877)
- Ilnacora divisa Reuter, 1876
- Ilnacora furcata Knight, 1963
- Ilnacora illini Knight, 1941
- Ilnacora infusca Knight & Schaffner, 1976
- Ilnacora inusta (Distant, 1884)
- Ilnacora malina (Uhler, 1877)
- Ilnacora mexicana Knight & Schaffner, 1976
- Ilnacora nicholi Knight, 1963
- Ilnacora nigrinasi (Van Duzee, 1916)
- Ilnacora pallida Knight & Schaffner, 1976
- Ilnacora recurvata Knight, 1963
- Ilnacora sanctacatalinae Knight
- Ilnacora santacatalinae Knight, 1963
- Ilnacora schaffneri Knight, 1963
- Ilnacora sonorensis Carvalho & Costa, 1992
- Ilnacora spicata Knight, 1963
- Ilnacora stalii Reuter, 1876
- Ilnacora tepicensis Carvalho & Costa, 1992
- Ilnacora texana Knight & Schaffner, 1976
- Ilnacora vittifrons Knight, 1963
