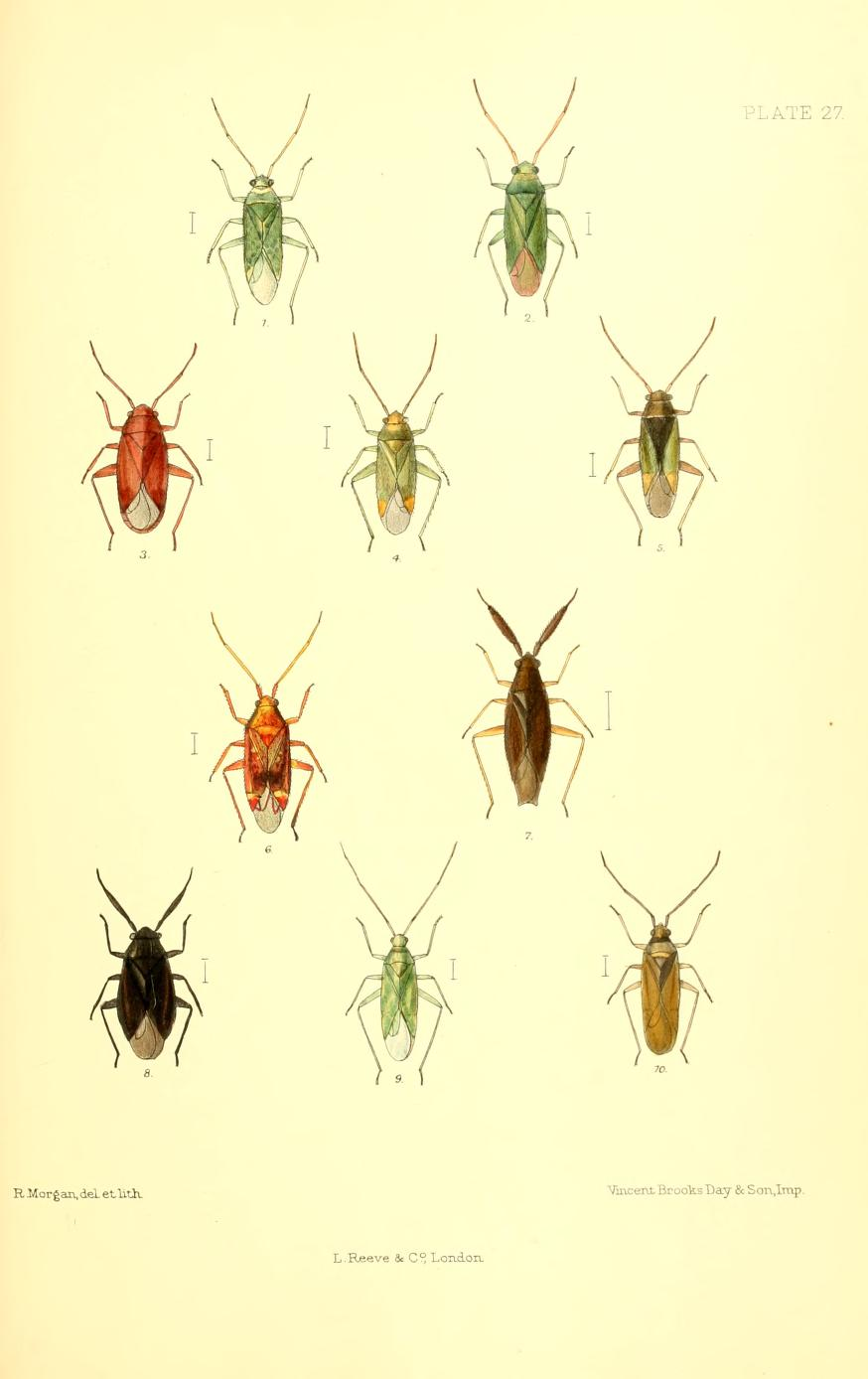
- Heterotoma merioptera depicted in Edward Saunders Hemiptera Heteroptera of the British Islands (figure 7)

Scientific classification
- Kingdom: Animalia
- Phylum: Arthropoda
- Class: Insecta
- Order: Hemiptera
- Suborder: Heteroptera
- Family: Miridae
- Genus: Heterotoma
- Species: H. merioptera

Binomial name
- Heterotoma merioptera (Scopoli, 1763)

= Heterotoma merioptera =

Species of true bug

Heterotoma merioptera is a species of bugs from Miridae family. It is a small slender dark plant bug. The second antennal segment is broad and flattened. The legs are light green. Heterotoma merioptera is very similar to Heterotoma planicornis and the name may be a synonym.
