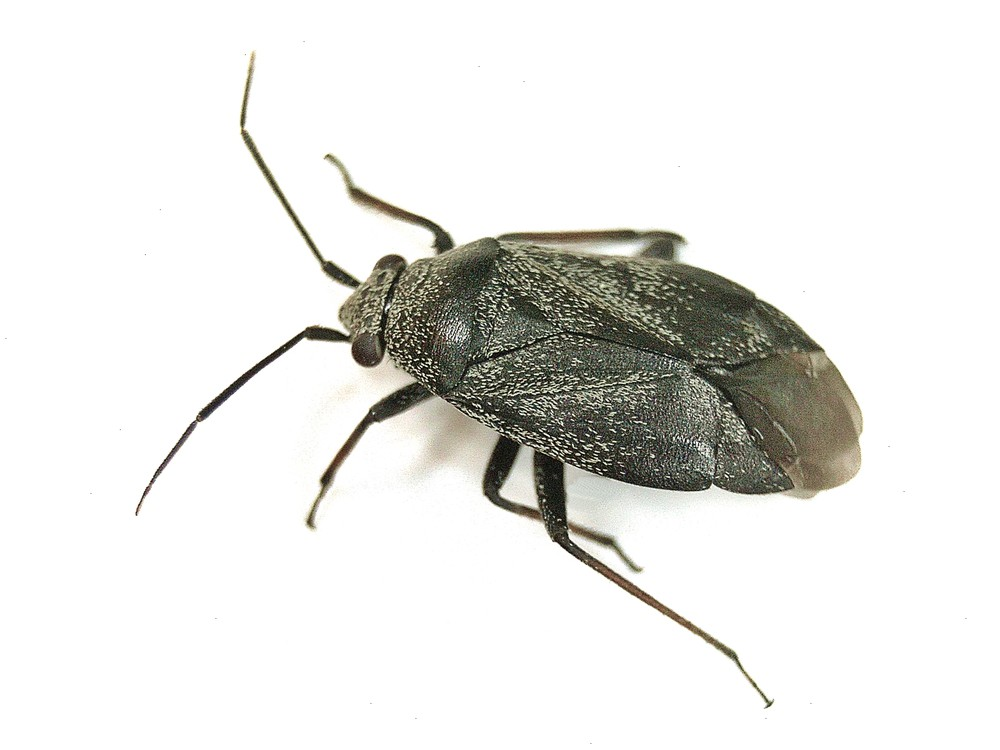
- Heterocordylus tibialis Molenhoek, the Netherlands

Scientific classification
- Kingdom: Animalia
- Phylum: Arthropoda
- Class: Insecta
- Order: Hemiptera
- Suborder: Heteroptera
- Family: Miridae
- Genus: Heterocordylus
- Species: H. tibialis

Binomial name
- Heterocordylus tibialis (Hahn, 1833)

= Heterocordylus tibialis =

Species of true bug

Heterocordylus tibialis is a Palearctic species of true bug.
