= Slaterocoris stygicus =

Scientific classification
- Kingdom: Animalia
- Phylum: Arthropoda
- Class: Insecta
- Order: Hemiptera
- Suborder: Heteroptera
- Family: Miridae
- Genus: Slaterocoris
- Species: S. stygicus

Binomial name
- Slaterocoris stygicus (Say, 1832)

Synonyms
- Capsus stygicus Say, 1832

Species of true bug

Slaterocoris stygicus is a species of plant bug in the family Miridae. It is found in North America.
