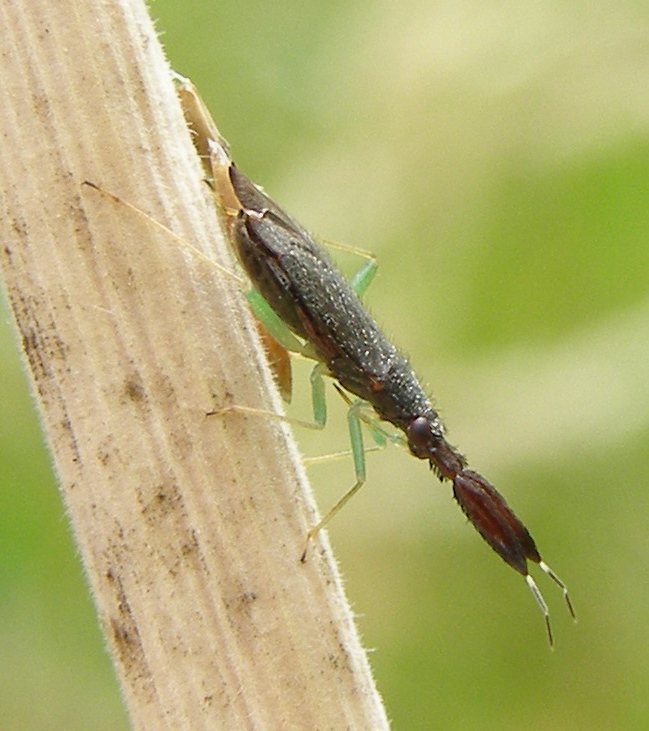
- Adult of Heterotoma planicornis

Scientific classification
- Kingdom: Animalia
- Phylum: Arthropoda
- Class: Insecta
- Order: Hemiptera
- Suborder: Heteroptera
- Family: Miridae
- Genus: Heterotoma
- Species: H. planicornis

Binomial name
- Heterotoma planicornis (Pallas, 1772)

Synonyms
- Cimex spissicornis Fabricius, 1777; Heterotoma spissicornis (Fabricius, 1777)

= Heterotoma planicornis =

Species of true bug

Heterotoma planicornis is a species of bug from Miridae family.

== Description ==
Heterotoma planicornis can reach a length of about 4.6–5.3 millimetres (0.18–0.21 in) in males, while females are quite longer, reaching 4.9–5.5 millimetres (0.19–0.22 in).

The species are black or dark red coloured with pale green legs. Adults have some short hairs and strange shaped antennae, with a large flattened second antennal segment (hence the Latin species name planicornis, meaning flat horn). The nymphs are reddish in color and also have said strange antennae.

These species are look almost like its counterpart, Heterotoma merioptera and can be difficult to distinguish.

== Ecology ==
The eggs are laid into young wood, hatch in May and the nymphs become adults by June. Adults occur from July to September. The eggs overwinter. This plant sucker shows one generation per year.

The nymphs and adults are active predators of spiders, aphids and mites. They are polyphagous, feeding on various insects (Psyllidae species, aphids and small other insects, Chrysomelidae and Lepidoptera eggs), but also on numerous plants and trees.

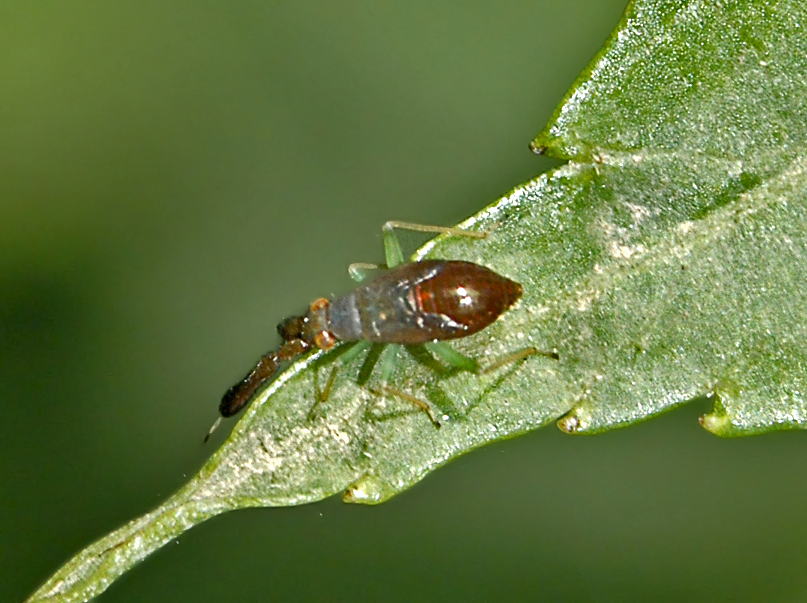
Nymph of Heterotoma planicornis

They prefer unripe fruits, buds, juices and nectar of various plants, mainly of Crataegus species, common alder (Alnus glutinosa), common hazel (Corylus avellana), oak (Quercus robur), nettles (especially Urtica dioica) and tansy Tanacetum vulgare.

== Distribution and habitat ==
The species can be found in the Nearctic realm, and in Central, Western, and Eastern Europe as far as the Caspian Sea, except for the Baltic states, Faroe Islands, Finland, Malta, and former Yugoslavia. These quite common bugs occur in neglected orchards, hedge rows, and in many gardens.
