= Cyllecoris marginatus =

Scientific classification
- Kingdom: Animalia
- Phylum: Arthropoda
- Class: Insecta
- Order: Hemiptera
- Suborder: Heteroptera
- Family: Miridae
- Genus: Cyllecoris
- Species: C. marginatus

Binomial name
- Cyllecoris marginatus (Fieber, 1870)

Species of true bug

Cyllecoris marginatus is a species of bugs in Miridae family that is found in Greece and Montenegro.
