= Ilnacorella =

Scientific classification
- Kingdom: Animalia
- Phylum: Arthropoda
- Clade: Pancrustacea
- Class: Insecta
- Order: Hemiptera
- Suborder: Heteroptera
- Family: Miridae
- Subfamily: Orthotylinae
- Tribe: Orthotylini
- Genus: Ilnacorella; Knight, 1925

Genus of true bugs

Ilnacorella is a genus of plant bugs in the family Miridae. There are about five described species in Ilnacorella.

== Species ==
These five species belong to the genus Ilnacorella:

- Ilnacorella argentata Knight, 1925
- Ilnacorella insignis (Van Duzee, 1916)
- Ilnacorella nigrisquamosa Knight, 1925
- Ilnacorella sulcata Knight, 1925
- Ilnacorella viridis (Uhler, 1895)
