= Brachynotocoris =

Scientific classification
- Kingdom: Animalia
- Phylum: Arthropoda
- Class: Insecta
- Order: Hemiptera
- Suborder: Heteroptera
- Family: Miridae
- Subfamily: Orthotylinae
- Tribe: Orthotylini
- Genus: Brachynotocoris; Reuter, 1880

Genus of true bugs

Brachynotocoris is a genus of mostly European capsid bugs in the tribe Orthotylini, erected by Odo Reuter in 1880. The type species Brachynotocoris puncticornis is found in northern Europe, including the British Isles.

== Species ==
According to BioLib the following are included:

1. Brachynotocoris cyprius Wagner, 1961 - subspecies:
  1. B. cyprius cyprius Wagner, 1961
  2. B. cyprius eduardwagneri Pagola-Carte, 2010
  3. B. cyprius inermis Linnavuori, 1965
2. Brachynotocoris parvinotum (Lindberg, 1940)
3. Brachynotocoris puncticornis Reuter, 1880 - type species
4. Brachynotocoris viticinus Seidenstücker, 1954
