= Parthenicus ruber =

Scientific classification
- Kingdom: Animalia
- Phylum: Arthropoda
- Class: Insecta
- Order: Hemiptera
- Suborder: Heteroptera
- Family: Miridae
- Genus: Parthenicus
- Species: P. ruber

Binomial name
- Parthenicus ruber Van Duzee, 1917

Species of true bug

Parthenicus ruber is a species of plant bugs in the family Miridae. It is found in Central America and North America.
