= Paraproba pendula =

Scientific classification
- Kingdom: Animalia
- Phylum: Arthropoda
- Class: Insecta
- Order: Hemiptera
- Suborder: Heteroptera
- Family: Miridae
- Genus: Paraproba
- Species: P. pendula

Binomial name
- Paraproba pendula Van Duzee, 1914

Species of true bug

Paraproba pendula is a species of plant bug in the family Miridae. It is found in North America.
