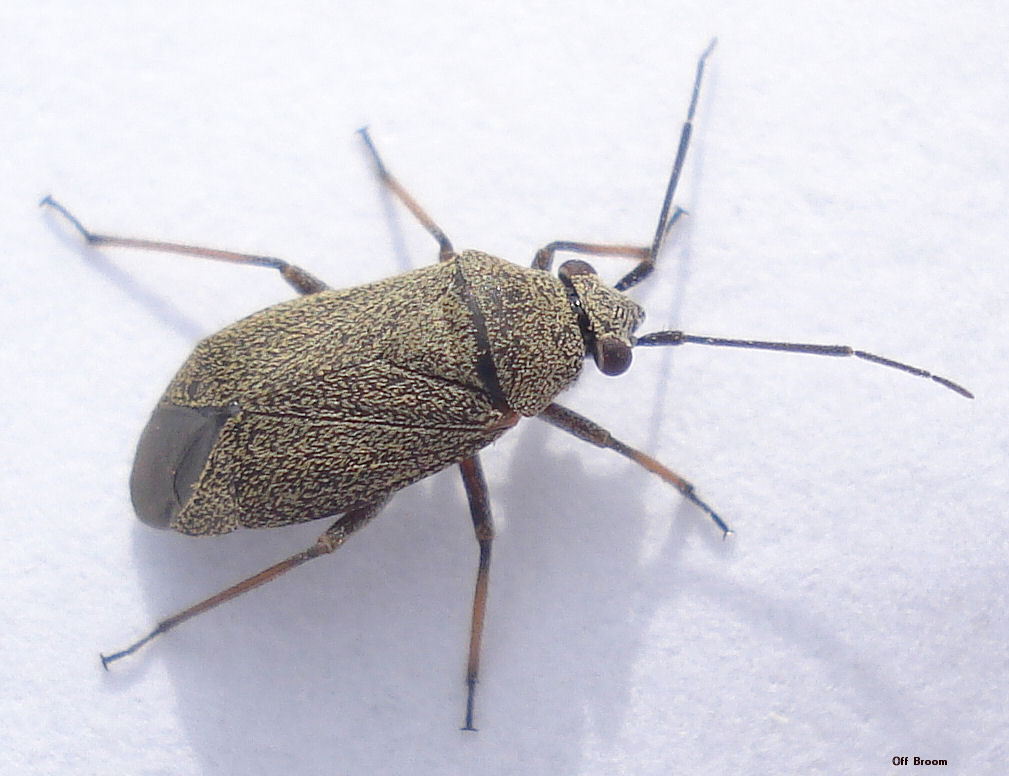
- Heterocordylus tibialis

Scientific classification
- Kingdom: Animalia
- Phylum: Arthropoda
- Clade: Pancrustacea
- Class: Insecta
- Order: Hemiptera
- Suborder: Heteroptera
- Family: Miridae
- Subfamily: Orthotylinae
- Tribe: Orthotylini
- Genus: Heterocordylus; Fieber, 1858

= Heterocordylus =

Genus of true bugs

Heterocordylus is a genus of plant bugs in the family Miridae. There are about 19 described species in Heterocordylus.

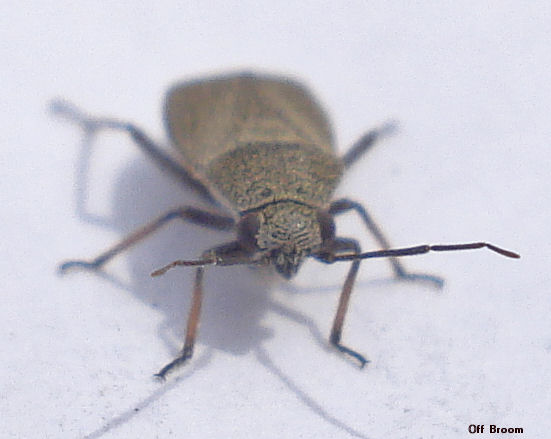
Heterocordylus tibialis

== Species ==
These 19 species belong to the genus Heterocordylus:

- Heterocordylus alutaceus Kulik, 1965
- Heterocordylus benardi Horvath, 1914
- Heterocordylus carbonellus Seidenstucker, 1956
- Heterocordylus cytisi Josifov, 1958
- Heterocordylus erythropthalmus (Hahn, 1833)
- Heterocordylus farinosus Horvath, 1887
- Heterocordylus genistae (Scopoli, 1763)
- Heterocordylus heissi Carapezza, 1990
- Heterocordylus italicus Kerzhner & Schuh, 1995
- Heterocordylus leptocerus (Kirschbaum, 1856)
- Heterocordylus malinus Slingerland, 1909
- Heterocordylus megara Linnavuori, 1972
- Heterocordylus montanus Lindberg, 1934
- Heterocordylus nausikaa Linnavuori, 1989
- Heterocordylus parvulus Reuter, 1881
- Heterocordylus pectoralis Wagner, 1943
- Heterocordylus pedestris Wagner, 1959
- Heterocordylus tibialis (Hahn, 1833)
- Heterocordylus tumidicornis (Herrich-Schaeffer, 1835)
