= Scalponotatus albibasis =

Scientific classification
- Kingdom: Animalia
- Phylum: Arthropoda
- Class: Insecta
- Order: Hemiptera
- Suborder: Heteroptera
- Family: Miridae
- Genus: Scalponotatus
- Species: S. albibasis

Binomial name
- Scalponotatus albibasis (Knight, 1938)

Species of true bug

Scalponotatus albibasis is a species of plant bug in the family Miridae. It is found in North America.
