= Aoplonema =

Scientific classification
- Kingdom: Animalia
- Phylum: Arthropoda
- Class: Insecta
- Order: Hemiptera
- Suborder: Heteroptera
- Family: Miridae
- Subfamily: Orthotylinae
- Tribe: Orthotylini
- Genus: Aoplonema; Knight, 1928

species
- see text

Genus of true bugs

Aoplonema is a genus of plant bugs in the family Miridae.

== Species ==
- Aoplonema nigrum Forero, 2008
- Aoplonema princeps (Uhler, 1894)
- Aoplonema rubrum Forero, 2008
