= Cyllecoris ernsti =

Scientific classification
- Kingdom: Animalia
- Phylum: Arthropoda
- Class: Insecta
- Order: Hemiptera
- Suborder: Heteroptera
- Family: Miridae
- Genus: Cyllecoris
- Species: C. ernsti

Binomial name
- Cyllecoris ernsti Matocq & Pluot-Sigwalt, 2006

Species of true bug

Cyllecoris ernsti is a species of bug in Miridae family that is endemic to Crete.
