= Reuteria fuscicornis =

Scientific classification
- Kingdom: Animalia
- Phylum: Arthropoda
- Class: Insecta
- Order: Hemiptera
- Suborder: Heteroptera
- Family: Miridae
- Genus: Reuteria
- Species: R. fuscicornis

Binomial name
- Reuteria fuscicornis Knight, 1939

Species of true bug

Reuteria fuscicornis is a species of plant bug in the family Miridae. It is found in North America.
