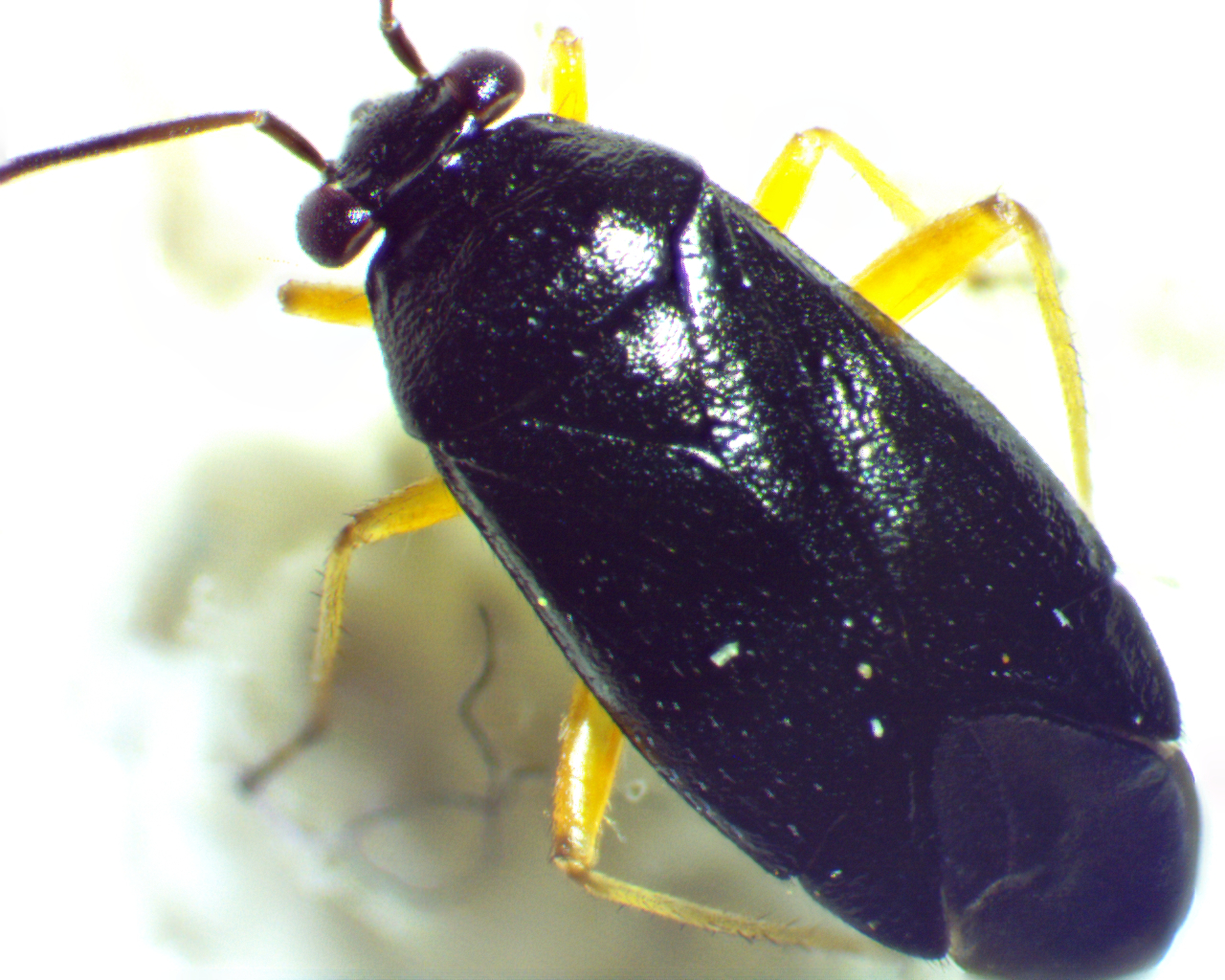
- Slaterocoris pallipes

Scientific classification
- Kingdom: Animalia
- Phylum: Arthropoda
- Clade: Pancrustacea
- Class: Insecta
- Order: Hemiptera
- Suborder: Heteroptera
- Family: Miridae
- Subfamily: Orthotylinae
- Tribe: Orthotylini
- Genus: Slaterocoris; Wagner, 1956

= Slaterocoris =

Genus of true bugs

Slaterocoris is a genus of plant bugs in the family Miridae. There are more than 50 described species in Slaterocoris.

== Species ==
These 52 species belong to the genus Slaterocoris:

- Slaterocoris alpinus Kelton, 1968
- Slaterocoris ambrosiae (Knight, 1938)
- Slaterocoris apache Kelton, 1968
- Slaterocoris argenteoides Schwartz, 2011
- Slaterocoris argenteus Kelton, 1968
- Slaterocoris arizonensis Knight, 1970
- Slaterocoris atratus (Uhler, 1894)
- Slaterocoris atritibialis (Knight, 1938)
- Slaterocoris basicornis Knight, 1970
- Slaterocoris bifidus Knight, 1970
- Slaterocoris breviatus (Knight, 1938)
- Slaterocoris burkei Knight, 1970
- Slaterocoris clavatus Schwartz, 2011
- Slaterocoris croceipes Knight, 1970
- Slaterocoris custeri Knight, 1970
- Slaterocoris dakotae Knight, 1970
- Slaterocoris digitatus Knight, 1970
- Slaterocoris elongatus Schwartz, 2011
- Slaterocoris flavipes Kelton, 1968
- Slaterocoris fuscicornis Knight, 1970
- Slaterocoris fuscomarginalis Knight, 1970
- Slaterocoris getzendaneri Knight, 1970
- Slaterocoris hirtus (Knight, 1938)
- Slaterocoris knowltoni Knight, 1970
- Slaterocoris longipennis Knight, 1970
- Slaterocoris maculatus Schwartz, 2011
- Slaterocoris minimus Knight, 1970
- Slaterocoris mohri (Knight, 1941)
- Slaterocoris nevadensis Knight, 1970
- Slaterocoris nicholi Knight, 1970
- Slaterocoris ovatus Knight, 1970
- Slaterocoris pallidicornis (Knight, 1938)
- Slaterocoris pallipes (Knight, 1926)
- Slaterocoris pilosus Kelton, 1968
- Slaterocoris punctatus (Distant, 1893)
- Slaterocoris rarus Knight, 1970
- Slaterocoris robustus (Uhler, 1895)
- Slaterocoris rubrofemoratus Knight, 1968
- Slaterocoris schaffneri Knight, 1970
- Slaterocoris sculleni Knight, 1970
- Slaterocoris severini Knight, 1970
- Slaterocoris sheridani Knight, 1968
- Slaterocoris simplex Kelton, 1968
- Slaterocoris solidaginis Kelton, 1968
- Slaterocoris sparsus Kelton, 1968
- Slaterocoris stygicus (Say, 1832)
- Slaterocoris subalbicans (Distant, 1893)
- Slaterocoris tanydexios Schwartz, 2011
- Slaterocoris texanus Knight, 1970
- Slaterocoris tibialis Knight, 1970
- Slaterocoris utahensis Knight, 1968
- Slaterocoris woodgatei Knight, 1970
