= Pseudopsallus =

Scientific classification
- Kingdom: Animalia
- Phylum: Arthropoda
- Clade: Pancrustacea
- Class: Insecta
- Order: Hemiptera
- Suborder: Heteroptera
- Family: Miridae
- Subfamily: Orthotylinae
- Tribe: Orthotylini
- Genus: Pseudopsallus; Van Duzee, 1916

Synonyms
- Bifidungulus Knight, 1930; Hesperocapsus Knight, 1968

Genus of true bugs

Pseudopsallus is a genus of plant bugs in the family Miridae. There are more than 20 described species in Pseudopsallus.

== Species ==
These 26 species belong to the genus Pseudopsallus:

- Pseudopsallus abroniae Knight, 1930
- Pseudopsallus angularis (Uhler, 1894)
- Pseudopsallus anograe Knight, 1930
- Pseudopsallus artemisicola Knight, 1930
- Pseudopsallus atriseta (Van Duzee, 1916)
- Pseudopsallus badger Stonedahl & Schwartz, 1988
- Pseudopsallus daleae (Knight, 1968)
- Pseudopsallus dememsus (Van Duzee, 1925)
- Pseudopsallus demensus (Van Duzee, 1925)
- Pseudopsallus enceliae Stonedahl & Schwartz, 1986
- Pseudopsallus greggii Schwartz, 2005
- Pseudopsallus hixsoni (Knight, 1969)
- Pseudopsallus lajuntae Stonedahl & Schwartz, 1986
- Pseudopsallus lattini Stonedahl & Schwartz, 1986
- Pseudopsallus major (Knight, 1969)
- Pseudopsallus mojaviensis Stonedahl & Schwartz, 1986
- Pseudopsallus occidentalis Stonedahl & Schwartz, 1986
- Pseudopsallus plagiatus (Knight, 1968)
- Pseudopsallus presidio Stonedahl & Schwartz, 1986
- Pseudopsallus puberus (Uhler, 1894)
- Pseudopsallus repertus (Uhler, 1895)
- Pseudopsallus sericatus (Uhler, 1895)
- Pseudopsallus stitti (Knight, 1968)
- Pseudopsallus tiquiliae Schwartz, 2005
- Pseudopsallus tulare Stonedahl & Schwartz, 1988
- Pseudopsallus viridicans (Knight, 1930)
