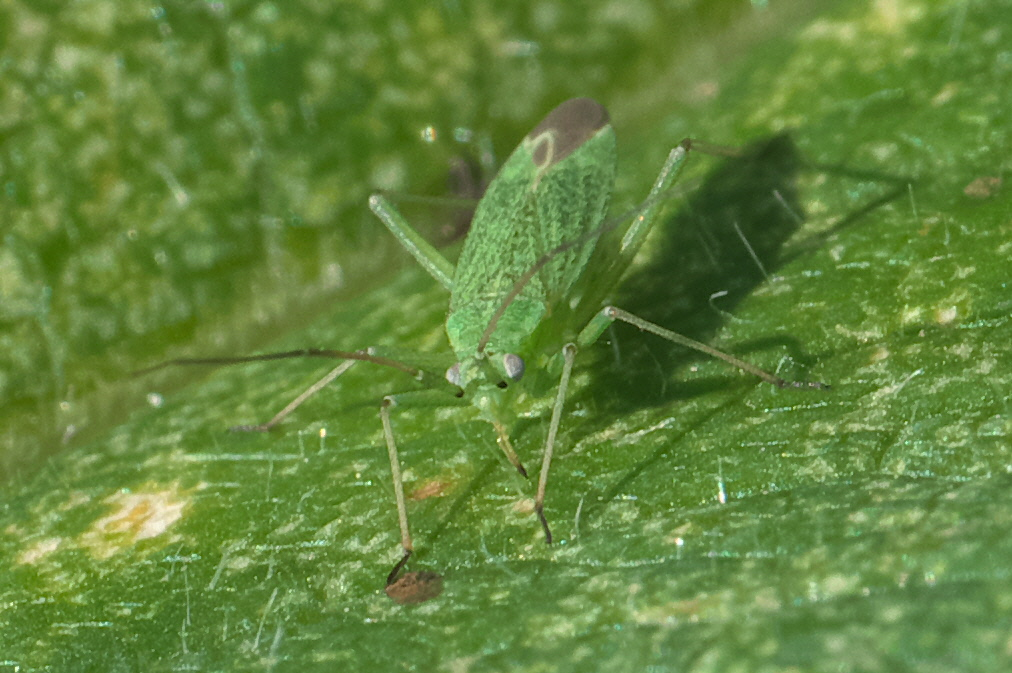

Scientific classification
- Kingdom: Animalia
- Phylum: Arthropoda
- Clade: Pancrustacea
- Class: Insecta
- Order: Hemiptera
- Suborder: Heteroptera
- Family: Miridae
- Subfamily: Orthotylinae
- Tribe: Orthotylini
- Genus: Brooksetta; Kelton, 1979

= Brooksetta =

Genus of true bugs

Brooksetta is a North American genus of plant bugs in the family Miridae. There are about 13 described species in Brooksetta.

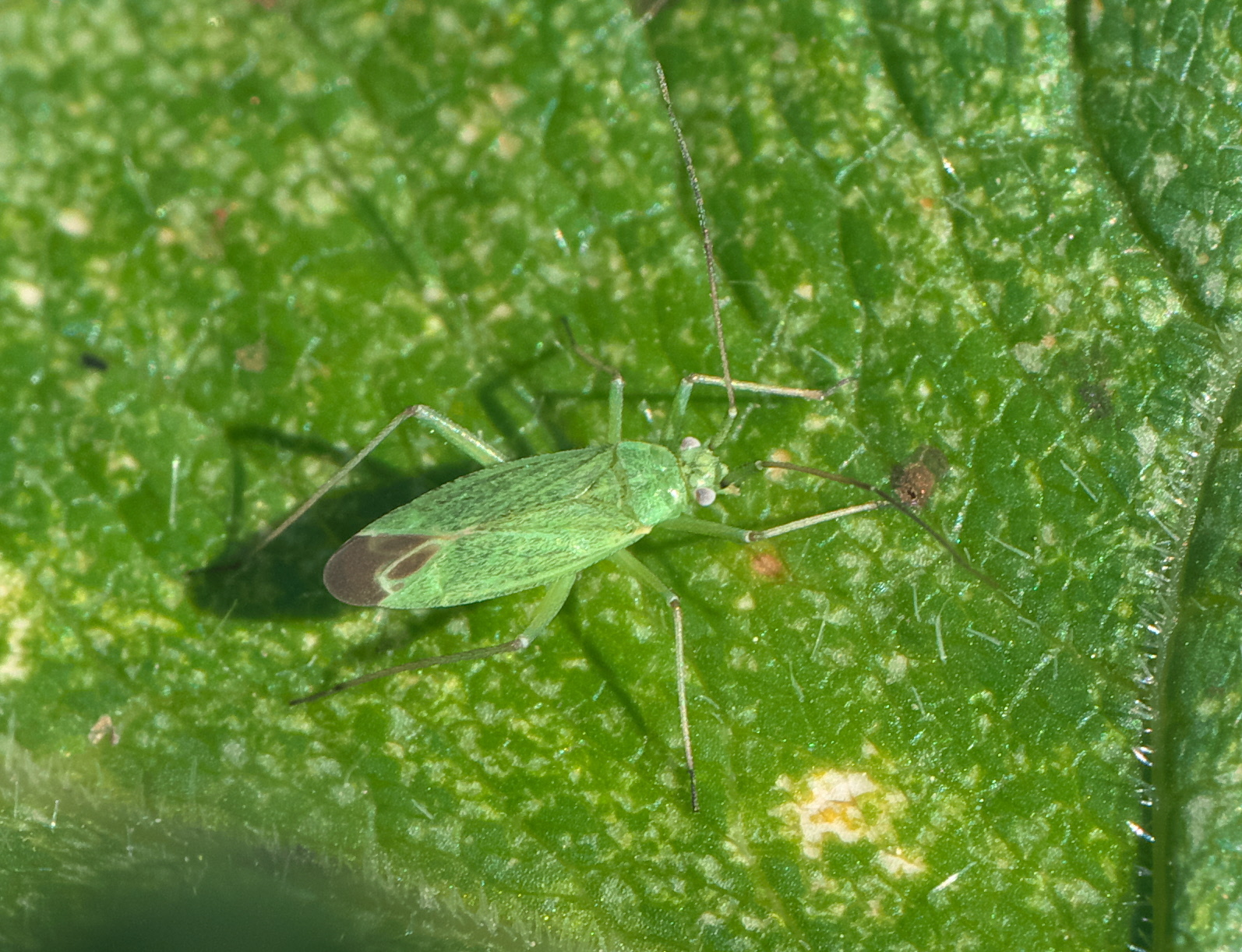

== Species ==
These 13 species belong to the genus Brooksetta:

- Brooksetta althaeae (Hussey, 1924) (hollyhock plant bug)
- Brooksetta azteci (Knight, 1968)
- Brooksetta californiana Carvalho, 1990
- Brooksetta chelifer (Knight, 1927)
- Brooksetta ferox (Van Duzee, 1916)
- Brooksetta inconspicua (Uhler, 1893)
- Brooksetta incurva (Knight, 1927)
- Brooksetta malvastri (Knight, 1968)
- Brooksetta nevadensis (Knight, 1968)
- Brooksetta nicholi (Knight, 1927)
- Brooksetta shoshonea (Knight, 1968)
- Brooksetta tibialis (Van Duzee, 1916)
- Brooksetta viridicata (Uhler, 1895)
