= Scalponotatus =

Scientific classification
- Kingdom: Animalia
- Phylum: Arthropoda
- Class: Insecta
- Order: Hemiptera
- Suborder: Heteroptera
- Family: Miridae
- Tribe: Orthotylini
- Genus: Scalponotatus; Kelton, 1969

Genus of true bugs

Scalponotatus is a genus of plant bugs in the family Miridae. There are about nine described species in Scalponotatus.

== Species ==
These nine species belong to the genus Scalponotatus.

- Scalponotatus albibasis (Knight, 1938)
- Scalponotatus chillcotti Kelton, 1969
- Scalponotatus dissimulans (Distant, 1893)
- Scalponotatus howdeni Kelton, 1969
- Scalponotatus insignis Kelton, 1969
- Scalponotatus lagunensis Carvalho and Costa, 1992
- Scalponotatus maturus Kelton, 1969
- Scalponotatus mexicanus Kelton, 1969
- Scalponotatus mimosus Kelton, 1969
