= Hadronema =

Scientific classification
- Kingdom: Animalia
- Phylum: Arthropoda
- Clade: Pancrustacea
- Class: Insecta
- Order: Hemiptera
- Suborder: Heteroptera
- Family: Miridae
- Subfamily: Orthotylinae
- Tribe: Orthotylini
- Genus: Hadronema; Uhler, 1872

species
- see text

Genus of true bugs

Hadronema is a genus of plant bugs in the family Miridae.

== Species ==
- Hadronema bispinosum Knight, 1928
- Hadronema breviatum Knight, 1928
- Hadronema incognitum Forero, 2008
- Hadronema mexicanum Forero, 2008
- Hadronema militaris Uhler, 1872
- Hadronema pictum Uhler, 1895
- Hadronema simplex Knight, 1928
- Hadronema sinuatum Knight, 1928
