= Labopella =

Scientific classification
- Kingdom: Animalia
- Phylum: Arthropoda
- Clade: Pancrustacea
- Class: Insecta
- Order: Hemiptera
- Suborder: Heteroptera
- Family: Miridae
- Tribe: Orthotylini
- Genus: Labopella; Knight, 1929
- Species: L. claripennis

Binomial name
- Labopella claripennis Knight, 1929

Genus of true bugs

Labopella is a genus of plant bugs in the family Miridae. There is one described species in Labopella, L. claripennis.
