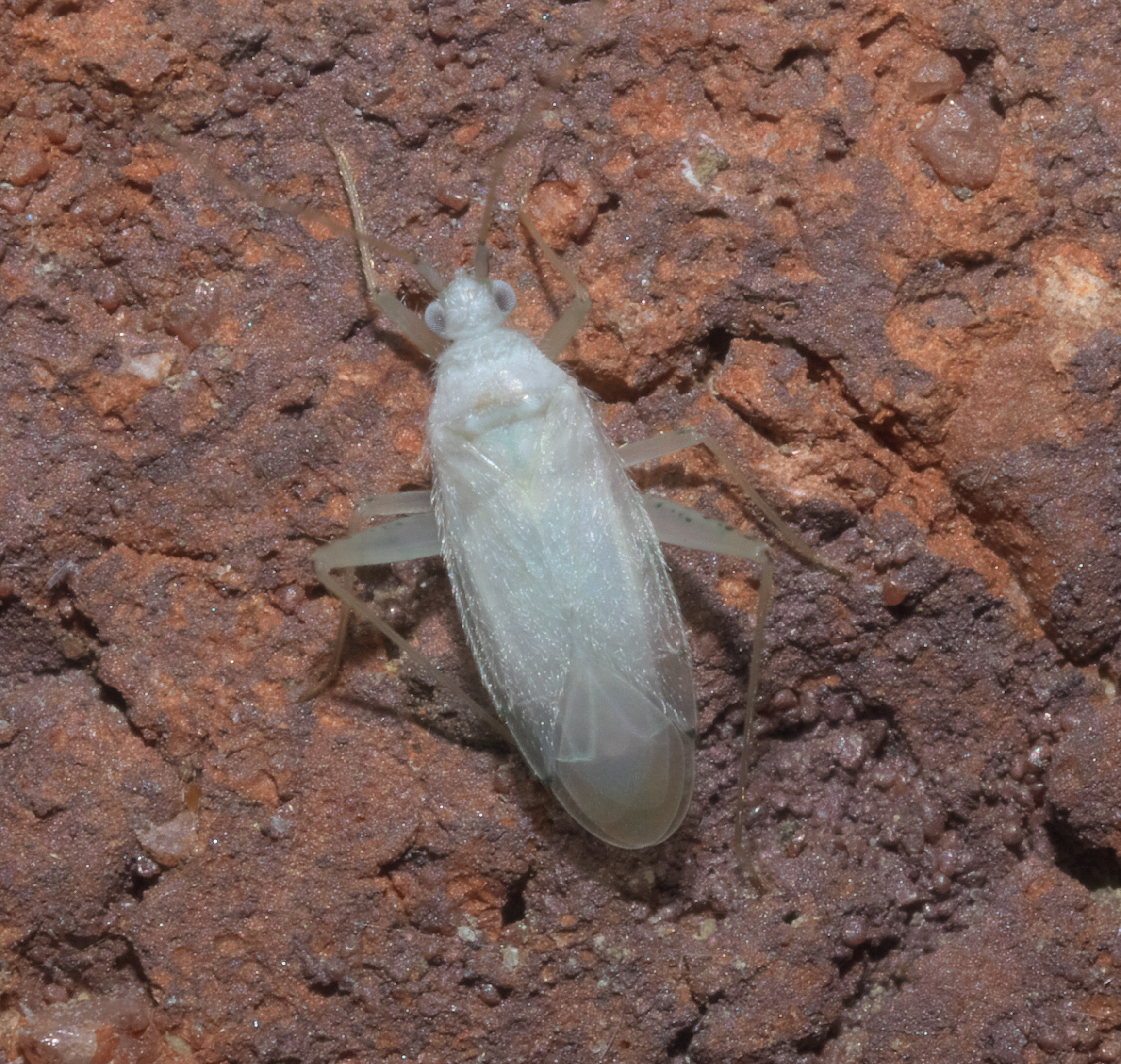

Scientific classification
- Kingdom: Animalia
- Phylum: Arthropoda
- Class: Insecta
- Order: Hemiptera
- Suborder: Heteroptera
- Family: Miridae
- Tribe: Orthotylini
- Genus: Reuteria; Puton, 1875

= Reuteria =

Genus of true bugs

Reuteria is a genus of plant bugs in the family Miridae. There are about 15 described species in Reuteria.

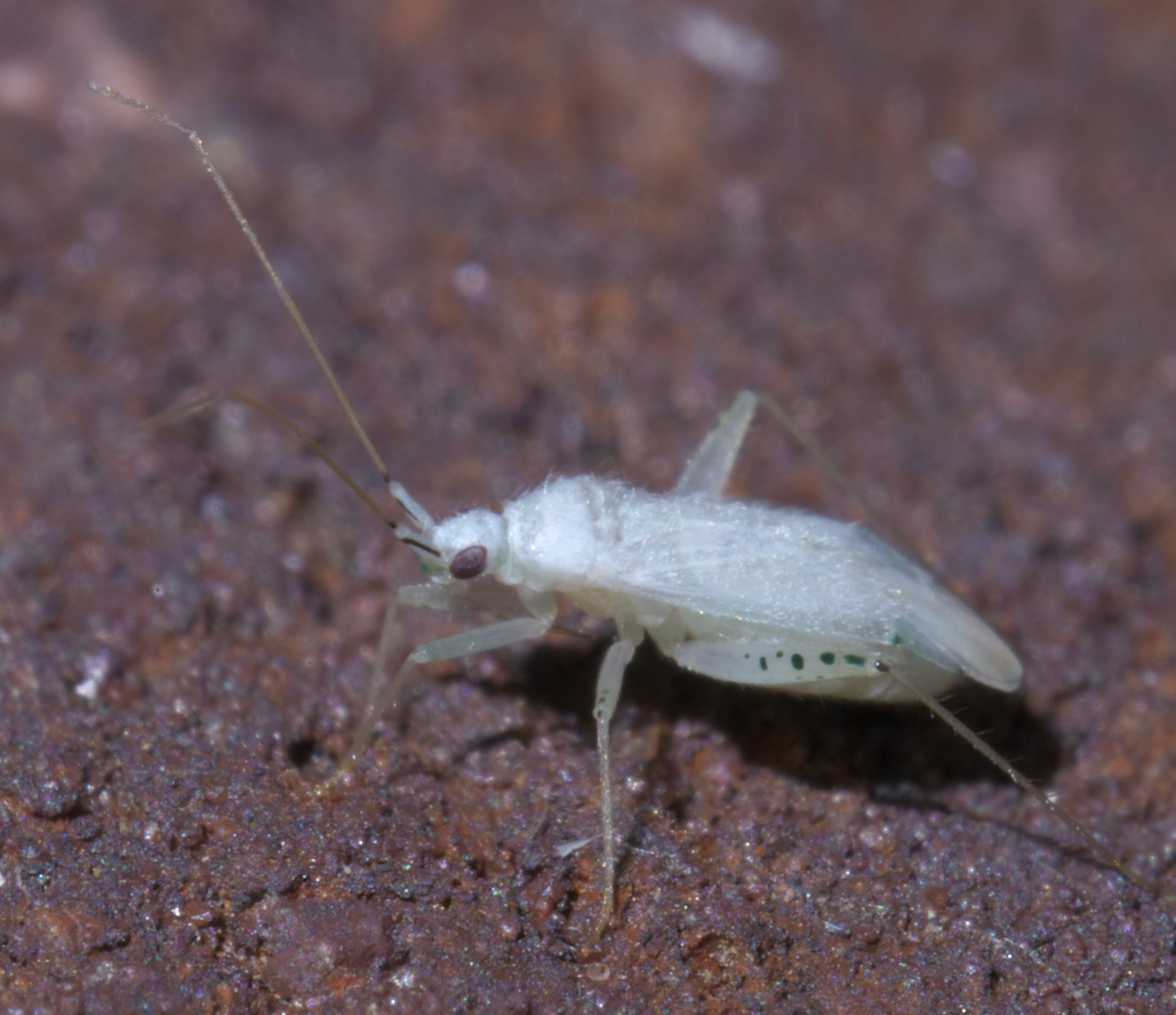
Reuteria

== Species ==
These 15 species belong to the genus Reuteria:

- Reuteria aceris Muminov, 1964
- Reuteria bifurcata Knight, 1939
- Reuteria castaneae Josifov, 1987
- Reuteria craigi Blinn, 1988
- Reuteria dobsoni Henry, 1976
- Reuteria fuscicornis Knight, 1939
- Reuteria irrorata (Say, 1832)
- Reuteria jordanica Carapezza, 2002
- Reuteria kiritshenkoi Muminov, 1964
- Reuteria marqueti Puron, 1875
- Reuteria mesasiatica Muminov, 1964
- Reuteria platani Knight, 1941
- Reuteria pollicaris Knight, 1939
- Reuteria querci Knight, 1939
- Reuteria wheeleri Henry, 1976
