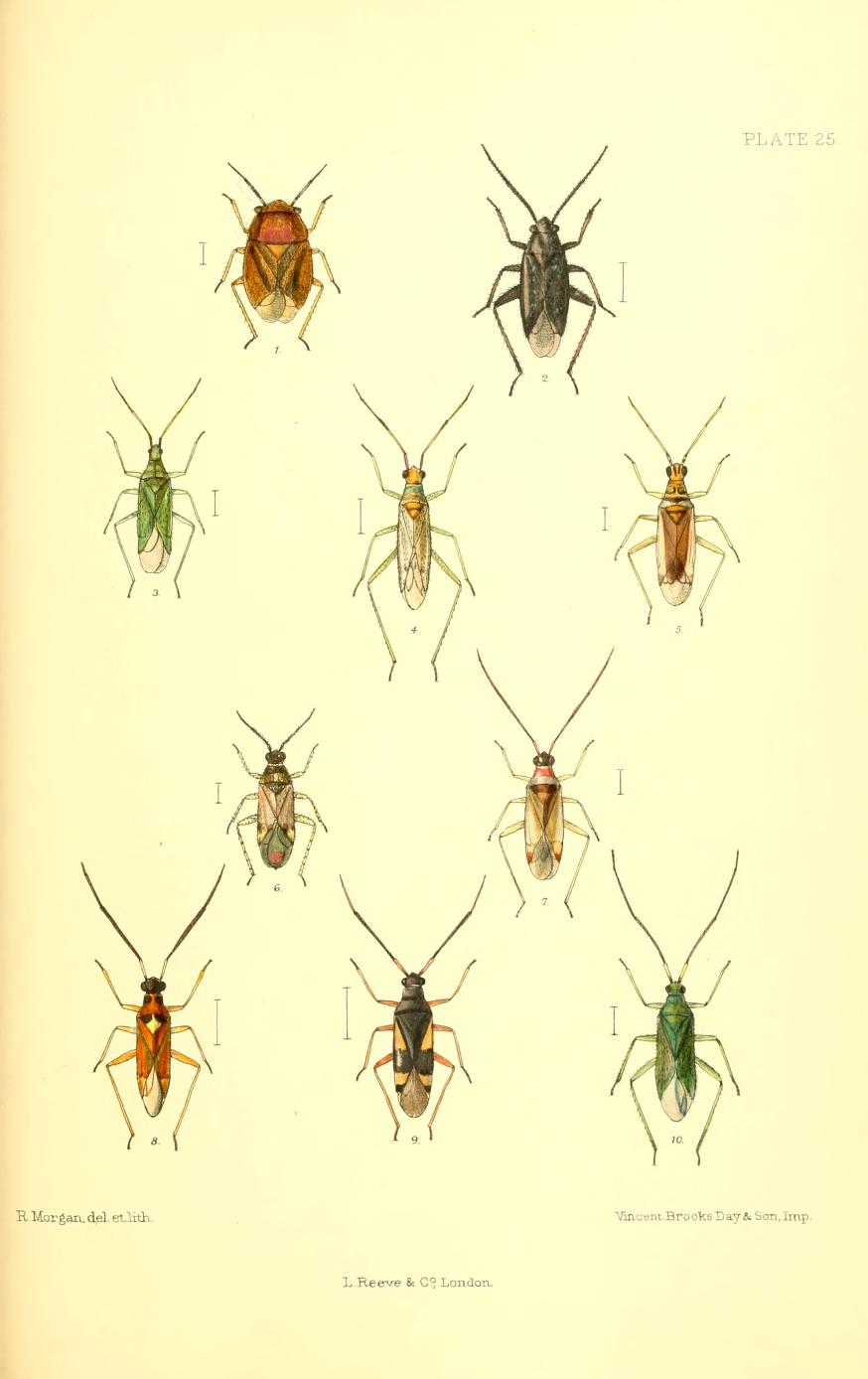

Scientific classification
- Domain: Eukaryota
- Kingdom: Animalia
- Phylum: Arthropoda
- Class: Insecta
- Order: Hemiptera
- Suborder: Heteroptera
- Family: Miridae
- Genus: Cyllecoris; Hahn, 1834

= Cyllecoris =

Genus of true bugs

Cyllecoris is a genus of true bugs belonging to the family Miridae. The species of this genus are found in Europe.

Species:

- Cyllecoris badius Liu & Zheng, 2000
- Cyllecoris djemagati V. Putshkov, 1970
- Cyllecoris equestris Stal, 1858
- Cyllecoris ernsti Matocq & Pluot-Sigwalt, 2006
- Cyllecoris histrionius (Linnaeus, 1767)
- Cyllecoris marginatus (Fieber, 1870)
- Cyllecoris merope Linnavuori, 1989
- Cyllecoris nakanishii Miyamoto, 1969
- Cyllecoris opacicollis Kerzhner, 1988
- Cyllecoris pericarti Magnien & Matocq, 2009
- Cyllecoris rectus Liu & Zheng, 2000
- Cyllecoris vicarius Kerzhner, 1988
