= Ephedrodoma =

Scientific classification
- Kingdom: Animalia
- Phylum: Arthropoda
- Clade: Pancrustacea
- Class: Insecta
- Order: Hemiptera
- Suborder: Heteroptera
- Family: Miridae
- Tribe: Orthotylini
- Genus: Ephedrodoma; Polhemus & Polhemus, 1984
- Species: E. multilineata

Binomial name
- Ephedrodoma multilineata Polhemus & Polhemus, 1984

Genus of true bugs

Ephedrodoma is a genus of plant bugs in the family Miridae. There is one described species in Ephedrodoma, E. multilineata.
