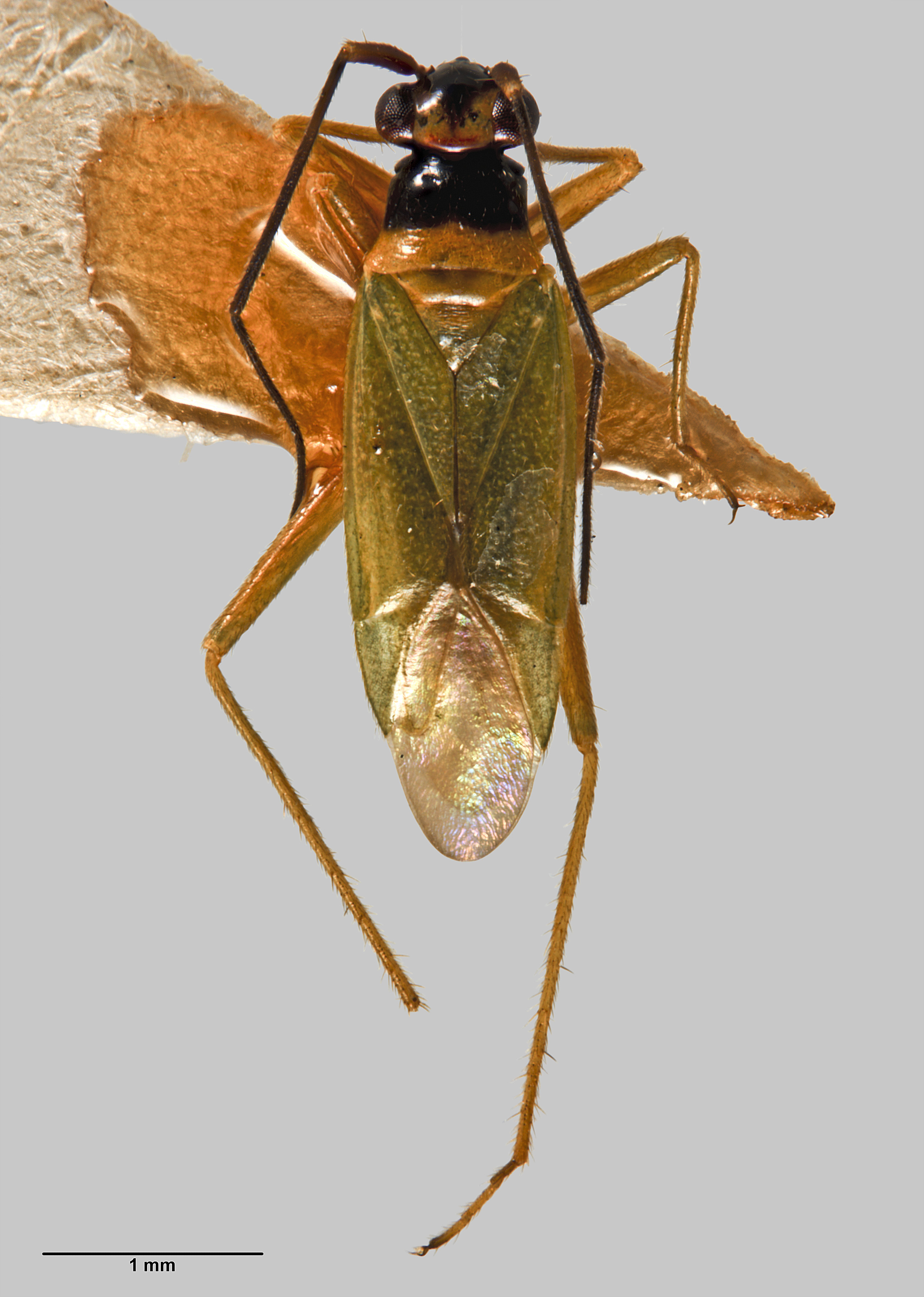
- Cyrtorhinus cumberi

Scientific classification
- Kingdom: Animalia
- Phylum: Arthropoda
- Class: Insecta
- Order: Hemiptera
- Suborder: Heteroptera
- Family: Miridae
- Tribe: Orthotylini
- Genus: Cyrtorhinus; Fieber, 1858

= Cyrtorhinus =

Genus of true bugs

Cyrtorhinus is a genus of plant bugs in the family Miridae. There are at least three described species in Cyrtorhinus.

== Species ==
- Cyrtorhinus caricis (Fallén, 1807)
- Cyrtorhinus fulvus Knight, 1935
- Cyrtorhinus lividipennis Reuter, 1884
