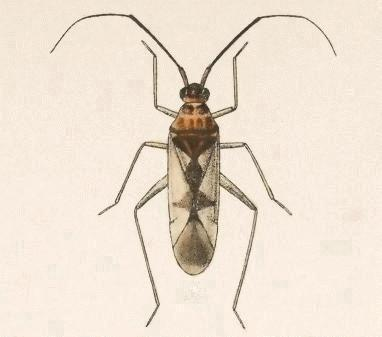
- Paraproba Fasciata

Scientific classification
- Kingdom: Animalia
- Phylum: Arthropoda
- Class: Insecta
- Order: Hemiptera
- Suborder: Heteroptera
- Family: Miridae
- Tribe: Orthotylini
- Genus: Paraproba; Distant, 1884

= Paraproba =

Genus of true bugs

Paraproba is a genus of plant bugs in the family Miridae. There are at least 20 described species in Paraproba.

== Species ==
These 26 species belong to the genus Paraproba:

- Paraproba amazonica Carvalho, 1983
- Paraproba brasiliana Carvalho and Ferreira, 1986
- Paraproba burkei Carvalho, 1987
- Paraproba capitata (Van Duzee, 1912)
- Paraproba cincta Van Duzee, 1917
- Paraproba clavonotata Carvalho, 1987
- Paraproba costaricana Carvalho, 1987
- Paraproba crotonica Carvalho, 1987
- Paraproba ecuatoriana Carvalho, 1987
- Paraproba fasciata Distant, 1884
- Paraproba fasciolata Reuter, 1908
- Paraproba hamata (Van Duzee, 1912)
- Paraproba insularis Carvalho, 1987
- Paraproba jamaicana Carvalho, 1987
- Paraproba mexicana Carvalho, 1987
- Paraproba niginervis Van Duzee, 1917
- Paraproba nigroscutellata Carvalho, 1987
- Paraproba pallescens Distant, 1884
- Paraproba pendula Van Duzee, 1914
- Paraproba schaffneri Carvalho, 1987
- Paraproba totolapana Carvalho, 1987
- Paraproba venezuelana Carvalho, 1987
- Paraproba veracruzana Carvalho, 1987
- Paraproba virescens Carvalho, 1987
- Paraproba viridipennis Carvalho, 1987
- Paraproba zacapoaxtla Carvalho, 1987
