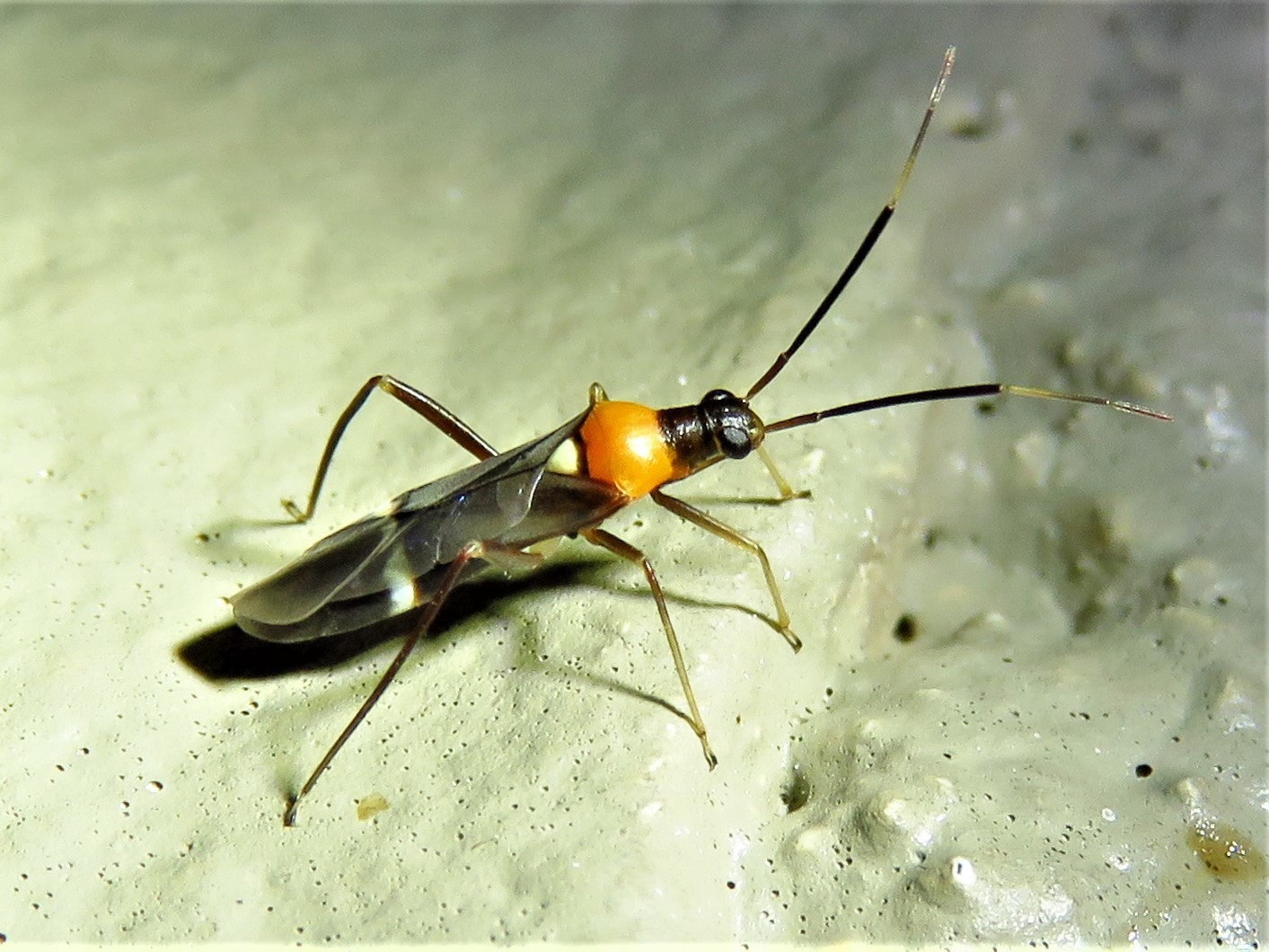

Scientific classification
- Kingdom: Animalia
- Phylum: Arthropoda
- Clade: Pancrustacea
- Class: Insecta
- Order: Hemiptera
- Suborder: Heteroptera
- Family: Miridae
- Tribe: Orthotylini
- Genus: Pseudoxenetus; Reuter, 1909
- Species: P. regalis

Binomial name
- Pseudoxenetus regalis (Uhler, 1890)

= Pseudoxenetus =

Genus of true bugs

Pseudoxenetus is a genus of plant bugs in the family Miridae. It is monotypic, having only one described species, Pseudoxenetus regalis. The species is specialized to only feed on oaks.
