= Pseudoloxops =

Scientific classification
- Domain: Eukaryota
- Kingdom: Animalia
- Phylum: Arthropoda
- Class: Insecta
- Order: Hemiptera
- Suborder: Heteroptera
- Family: Miridae
- Genus: Pseudoloxops; Kirkaldy, 1905

Genus of true bugs

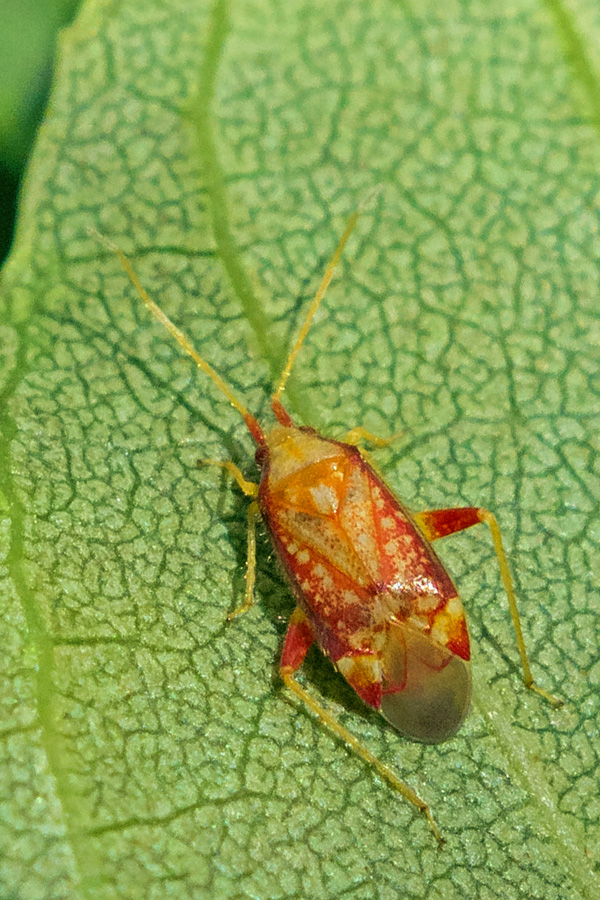
Pseudoloxops coccineus saarnilude (female)

Pseudoloxops is a genus of true bugs belonging to the family Miridae.

The species of this genus are found in Europe and Southeastern Asia.

Species:

- Pseudoloxops aama Balukjian & Van Dam, 2024
- Pseudoloxops anaana Balukjian & Van Dam, 2024
- Pseudoloxops adamsoni (Knight, 1937)
- Pseudoloxops amabilis Linnavuori, 1986
- Pseudoloxops baileyi Balukjian & Van Dam, 2024
- Pseudoloxops chastaoliancai Balukjian & Van Dam, 2024
- Pseudoloxops harrisonfordi Balukjian & Van Dam, 2024
- Pseudoloxops kamalaharrisae Balukjian & Van Dam, 2024
- Pseudoloxops oboyskii Balukjian & Van Dam, 2024
- Pseudoloxops papepihaa Balukjian & Van Dam, 2024
