= Fieberocapsus =

Scientific classification
- Domain: Eukaryota
- Kingdom: Animalia
- Phylum: Arthropoda
- Class: Insecta
- Order: Hemiptera
- Suborder: Heteroptera
- Family: Miridae
- Genus: Fieberocapsus; Carvalho & Southwood, 1955

Genus of true bugs

Fieberocapsus is a genus of true bugs belonging to the family Miridae.

The species of this genus are found in Europe and Northern America.

Species:

- Fieberocapsus flaveolus (Reuter, 1870)
