= Malacocoris =

- Malacocoris chlorizans

Scientific classification
- Domain: Eukaryota
- Kingdom: Animalia
- Phylum: Arthropoda
- Class: Insecta
- Order: Hemiptera
- Suborder: Heteroptera
- Family: Miridae
- Genus: Malacocoris; Fieber, 1858

Genus of true bugs

Malacocoris is a genus of true bugs belonging to the family Miridae.

The species of this genus are found in Europe and North America.

Species:

- Malacocoris chlorizans (Panzer, 1794)
- Malacocoris elongatus Carvalho, 1982
