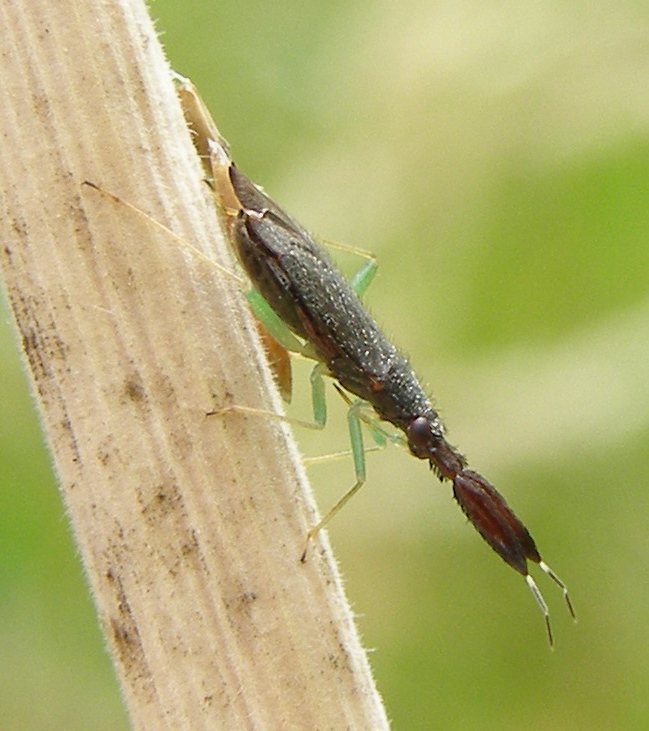

Scientific classification
- Kingdom: Animalia
- Phylum: Arthropoda
- Class: Insecta
- Order: Hemiptera
- Suborder: Heteroptera
- Family: Miridae
- Tribe: Orthotylini
- Genus: Heterotoma; Le Peletier & Serville, 1825

= Heterotoma (bug) =

Genus of true bugs

Heterotoma is a genus of bug from Miridae family.

== Species ==
- Heterotoma dentipennis (Bergroth, 1914)
- Heterotoma diversipes Puton, 1876
- Heterotoma merioptera (Scopoli, 1763)
- Heterotoma planicornis (Pallas, 1772)
