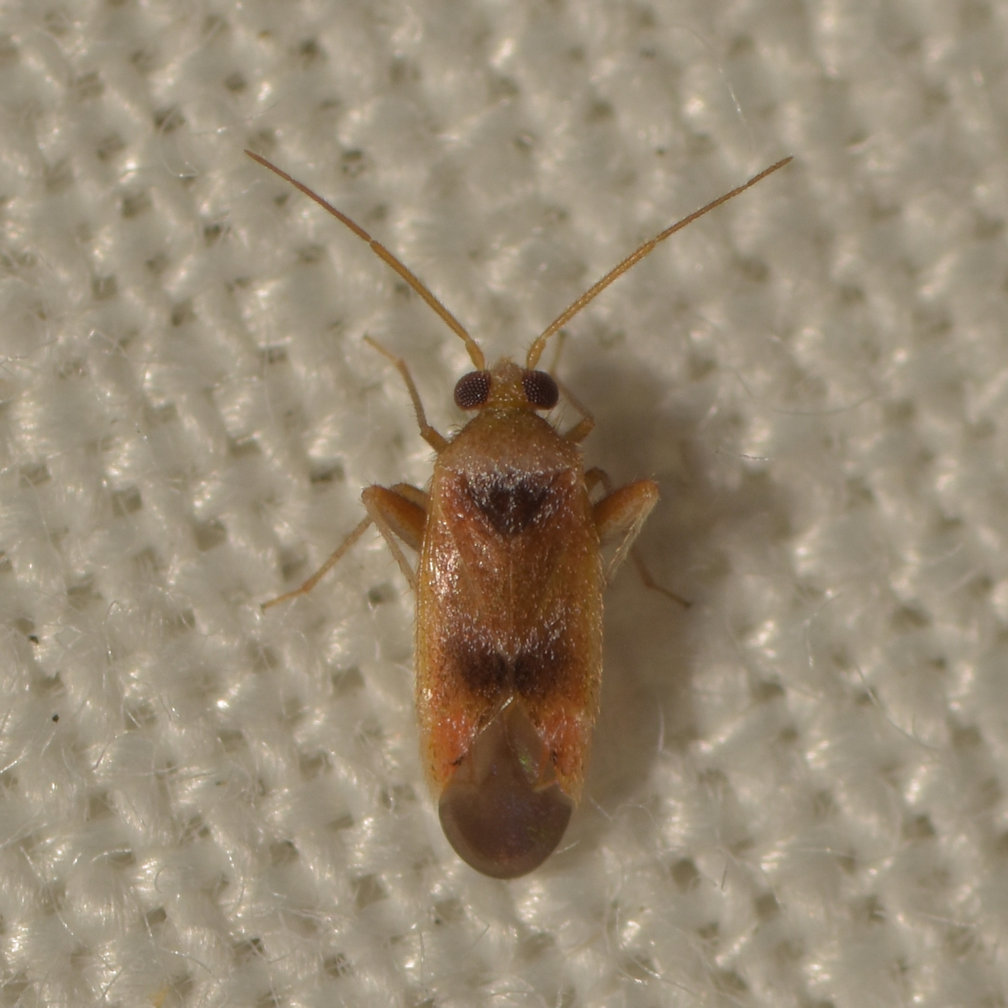

Scientific classification
- Kingdom: Animalia
- Phylum: Arthropoda
- Class: Insecta
- Order: Hemiptera
- Suborder: Heteroptera
- Family: Miridae
- Subfamily: Orthotylinae
- Tribe: Orthotylini
- Genus: Parthenicus; Reuter, 1876

= Parthenicus =

Genus of true bugs

Parthenicus is a genus of plant bugs in the family Miridae. There are at least 70 described species in Parthenicus.

== See also ==
- List of Parthenicus species
