= Orthotylinae =

- Malacocoris chlorizans

Scientific classification
- Kingdom: Animalia
- Phylum: Arthropoda
- Clade: Pancrustacea
- Class: Insecta
- Order: Hemiptera
- Suborder: Heteroptera
- Family: Miridae
- Subfamily: Orthotylinae; Van Duzee, 1916

Subfamily of true bugs

Orthotylinae is a subfamily of plant bugs in the family Miridae. There are at least 650 described species and at least 70 genera in Orthotylinae. The Orthotylinae have traditionally been diagnosed by their possession of lamellate, apically divergent parempodia.

== Tribes ==
BioLib includes:

1. Austromirini Carvalho, 1976
  1. Austromiris Kirkaldy, 1902
  2. Dasymiris Poppius, 1911
  3. Fronsetta Cassis, 2008
  4. Kirkaldyella Poppius, 1921
  5. Lattinova Cassis, 2008
  6. Metopocoris Cassis, 2008
  7. Myrmecoridea Poppius, 1921
  8. Myrmecoroides Gross, 1963
  9. Porphyrodema Reuter, 1904
  10. Sinistropa Cassis, 2008
  11. Watarrkamiris Cassis, 2008
  12. Zanessa Kirkaldy, 1902
2. Ceratocapsini Van Duzee, 1916
3. Coridromiini Tatarnic & Cassis, 2012
  1. Coridromius Signoret, 1862
4. Halticini A. Costa, 1853
5. Nichomachini Schuh, 1974
  1. Laurinia Reuter, 1884
  2. Nichomachus (bug) Distant, 1904
  3. Pseudonichomachus Schuh, 1974
6. Orthotylini Van Duzee, 1916
- unplaced genus Cafayatina Carvalho & Carpintero, 1986

== See also ==
- List of Orthotylinae genera
