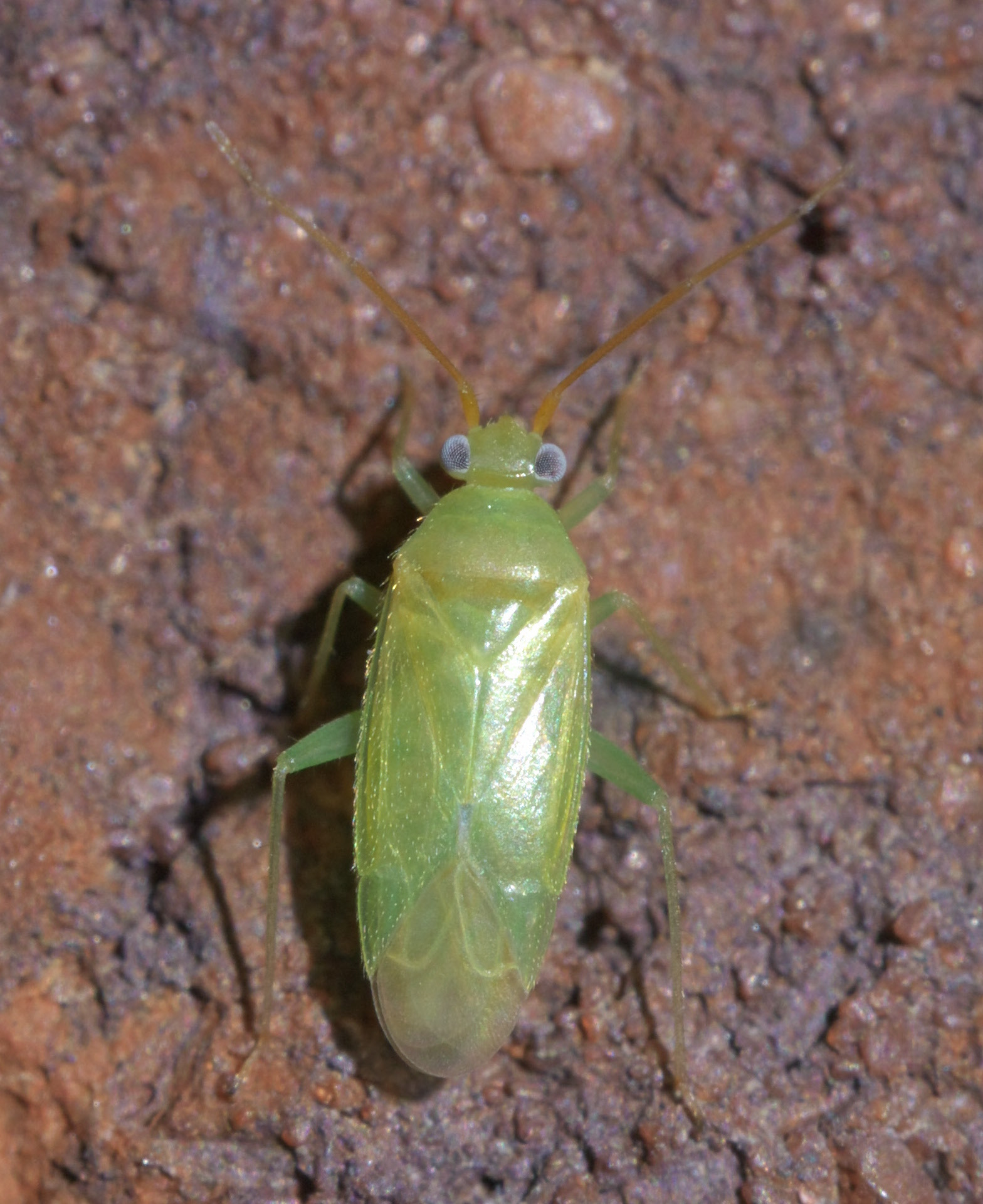

Scientific classification
- Domain: Eukaryota
- Kingdom: Animalia
- Phylum: Arthropoda
- Class: Insecta
- Order: Hemiptera
- Suborder: Heteroptera
- Family: Miridae
- Subfamily: Orthotylinae
- Tribe: Orthotylini; Van Duzee, 1916

= Orthotylini =

Tribe of true bugs

Orthotylini is a tribe of plant bugs in the family Miridae. There are more than 230 described genera in Orthotylini.

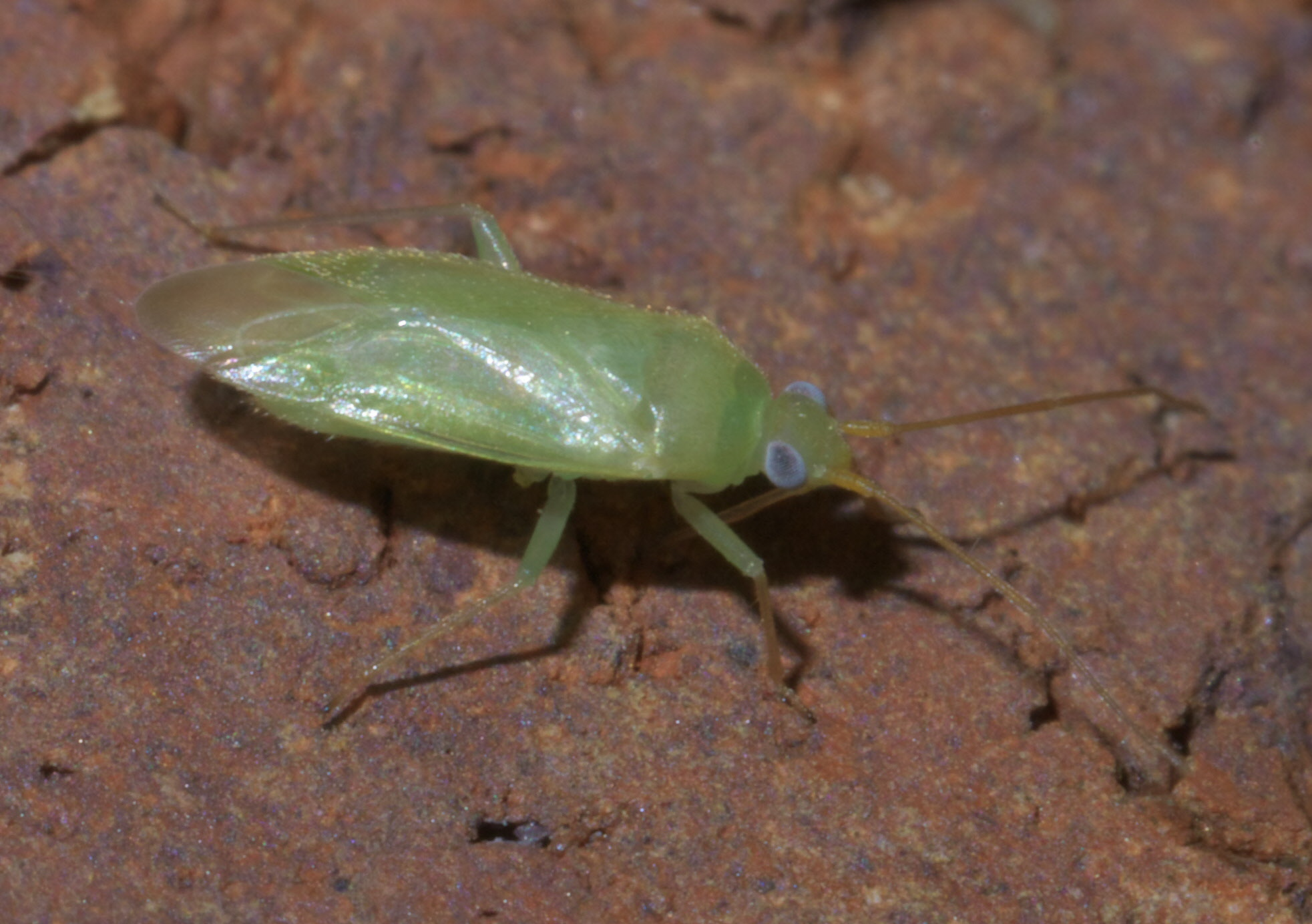

== Selected genera ==
The following genera belong to the tribe Orthotylini:

- Acaciacoris Schaffner, 1977^{i c g}
- Aoplonema Knight, 1928^{c g b}
- Aoplonemella Forero, 2008^{c g b}
- Apachemiris Carvalho and Schaffner, 1974^{i c g}
- Argyrocoris Van Duzee, 1912^{i c g}
- Ballella Knight, 1959^{i c g}
- Blepharidopterus Kolenati, 1845^{i c g b}
- Brachynotocoris Reuter, 1880^{i c g}
- Brooksetta Kelton, 1979^{i c g b}
- Ceratopidea Knight, 1968^{i}
- Cyllecoris Hahn, 1834
- Cyrtorhinus Fieber, 1858^{i c g b}
- Daleapidea Knight, 1968^{i c g}
- Diaphnidia Uhler, 1895^{i c g}
- Dichaetocoris Knight, 1968^{i c g b}
- Ephedrodoma Polhemus & Polhemus, 1984^{i c g b}
- Fieberocapsus Carvalho and Southwood, 1955^{i c g}
- Hadronema Uhler, 1872^{i c g b}
- Hadronemidea Reuter, 1908
- Heterocordylus Fieber, 1858^{i c g b}
- Heterotoma Lepeletier & Serville, 1825^{i c g b}
- Hyalochloria Reuter, 1907^{i c g}
- Ilnacora Reuter, 1876^{i c g b}
- Ilnacorella Knight, 1925^{i c g b}
- Jobertus Distant, 1893^{i c g}
- Kalania Kirkaldy, 1904^{i c g}
- Kamehameha Kirkaldy, 1902^{i c g}
- Koanoa Kirkaldy, 1902^{i c g}
- Labopella Knight, 1929^{i c g b}
- Labopidea Uhler, 1877^{i c g b}
- Lindbergocapsus Wagner, 1960^{i g}
- Lopidea Uhler, 1872^{i c g b}
- Lopidella Knight, 1925^{i c g b}
- Loulucoris Asquith, 1995^{i c g}
- Malacocoris Fieber, 1858^{i c g b}
- Mecomma Fieber, 1858^{i c g b}
- Melanotrichus Reuter, 1875^{i g}
- Melymacra Schwartz, 2004^{i c g}
- Nesiomiris Kirkaldy, 1902^{i c g}
- Noctuocoris Knight, 1923^{i c g}
- Oaxacacoris Schwartz and Stonedahl, 1987^{i c g}
- Origonema Forero, 2008^{c g b}
- Orthotylus Fieber, 1858^{i c g b}
- Paraproba Distant, 1884^{i c g b}
- Parthenicus Reuter, 1876^{i c g b}
- Platycranus Fieber, 1870
- Proboscidotylus Henry, 1995^{i c g b}
- Pseudoclerada Kirkaldy, 1902^{i c g}
- Pseudoloxops Kirkaldy, 1905^{i c g}
- Pseudopsallus Van Duzee, 1916^{i c g b}
- Pseudoxenetus Reuter, 1909^{i c g b}
- Renodaeus Distant, 1893^{i c g b}
- Reuteria Puton, 1875^{i c g b}
- Saileria Hsiao, 1945^{i c g b}
- Sarona Kirkaldy, 1902^{i c g}
- Scalponotatus Kelton, 1969^{i c g b}
- Sericophanes Reuter, 1876^{i c g b}
- Slaterocoris Wagner, 1956^{i c g b}
- Squamocoris Knight, 1968^{i c g}
- Sulamita Kirkaldy, 1902^{i c g}
- Texocoris Schaffner, 1974^{i c g}

Data sources: i = ITIS, c = Catalogue of Life, g = GBIF, b = Bugguide.net
