= Locust tree =

Locust tree can mean:

- Any of a number of tree species in the genera Gleditsia or Robinia, including:
  - Honey locust (Gleditsia triacanthos), a leguminous tree with pods having a sweet, edible pulp
  - Black locust (Robinia pseudoacacia), a leguminous tree with toxic pods
  - Water locust (Gleditsia aquatica), a leguminous tree with one seed per pod
- Less commonly, "African locust bean tree" (Parkia biglobosa), which is also known as néré
- Also not commonly, the carob tree, Ceratonia siliqua, whose pods are called locust beans

== Etymology ==
"Locust" comes from the Latin locusta, meaning both "locust" (the insect) and "lobster". By analogy with a Levantine use of the Greek word for the insect, akris, for the pods of the carob tree, which supposedly resembled it, the pod-bearing North American tree started to be called "locust" in the 1630s.
