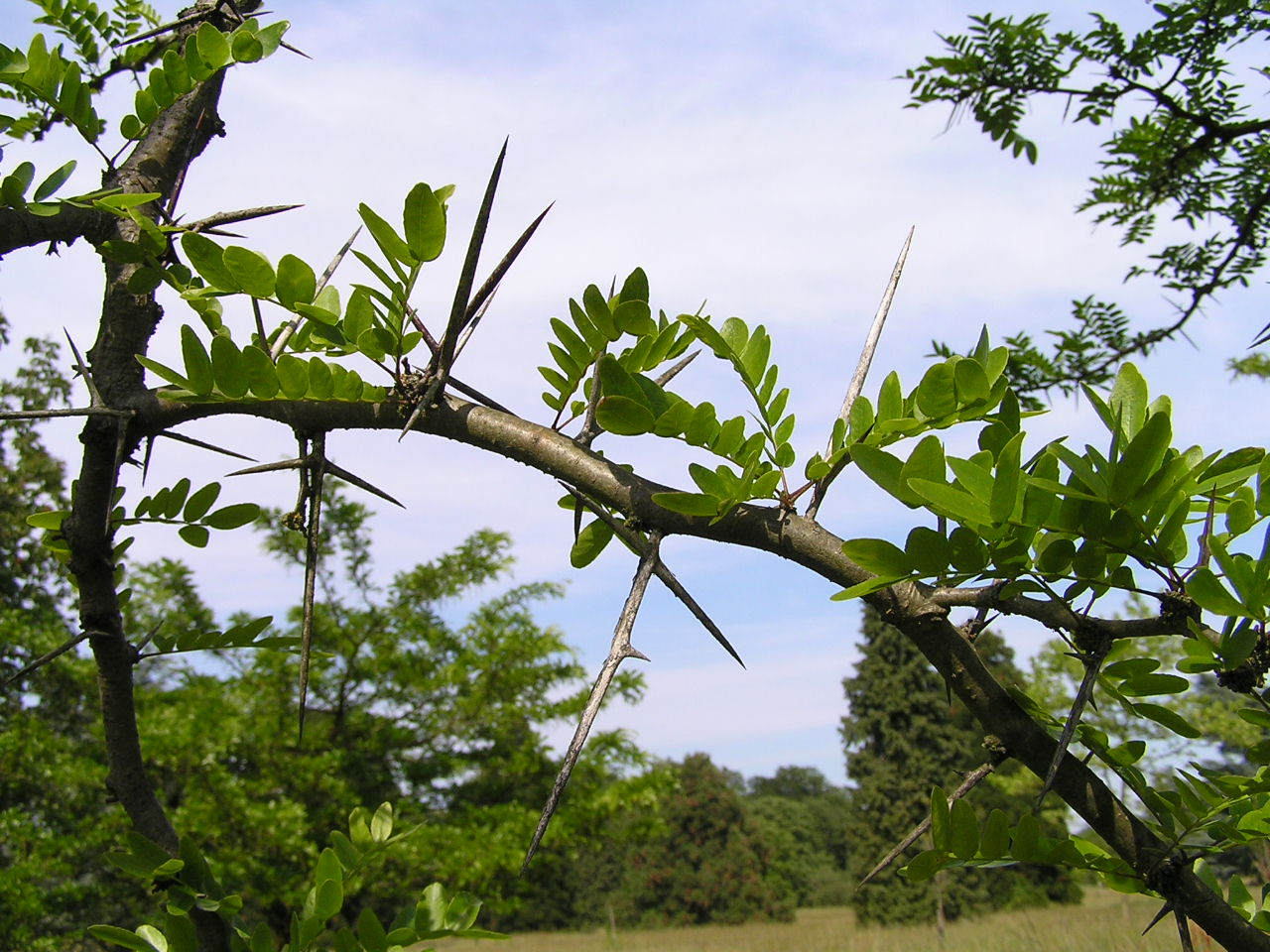

Scientific classification
- Kingdom: Plantae
- Clade: Tracheophytes
- Clade: Angiosperms
- Clade: Eudicots
- Clade: Rosids
- Order: Fabales
- Family: Fabaceae
- Subfamily: Caesalpinioideae
- Genus: Gleditsia
- Species: G. × texana

Binomial name
- Gleditsia × texana Sarg.

Synonyms
- Gleditsia brachycarpa Nutt. nom. illeg. 1821; Gleditsia hebecarpa S.McCoy 1959

= Gleditsia × texana =

Texas honey locust

Species of legume

Gleditsia × texana, the Texas honey locust, is a tree native to America. It is a naturally occurring hybrid of Gleditsia aquatica × Gleditsia triacanthos.
