= Agrilus pseudofallax =

Scientific classification
- Kingdom: Animalia
- Phylum: Arthropoda
- Clade: Pancrustacea
- Class: Insecta
- Order: Coleoptera
- Suborder: Polyphaga
- Infraorder: Elateriformia
- Family: Buprestidae
- Genus: Agrilus
- Species: A. pseudofallax

Binomial name
- Agrilus pseudofallax Frost, 1923

Species of beetle

Agrilus pseudofallax is a species of metallic wood-boring beetle in the family Buprestidae. It is found across North America, ranging from Texas to Pennsylvania.

== Description ==
Agrilus pseudofallax is similar in appearance to the most robust specimens of A. fallax, giving it its name. It is dark bronze in color, with three pairs of white dots across the elytra.

Its larva feed upon the honey locust (Gleditsia triacanthos).

== Classification ==
A. pseudofallax is sometimes included in the subgenus Agrilus (Agrilus).
