= Blepharidopterus provancheri =

Scientific classification
- Kingdom: Animalia
- Phylum: Arthropoda
- Class: Insecta
- Order: Hemiptera
- Suborder: Heteroptera
- Family: Miridae
- Genus: Blepharidopterus
- Species: B. provancheri

Binomial name
- Blepharidopterus provancheri (Burque, 1887)

Species of true bug

Blepharidopterus provancheri is a species of green coloured bugs from the Miridae family, that can be found in the United States and Canada.
