= Gleditsia assamica =

Conservation status
- Vulnerable (IUCN 2.3)

Scientific classification
- Kingdom: Plantae
- Clade: Tracheophytes
- Clade: Angiosperms
- Clade: Eudicots
- Clade: Rosids
- Order: Fabales
- Family: Fabaceae
- Subfamily: Caesalpinioideae
- Genus: Gleditsia
- Species: G. assamica

Binomial name
- Gleditsia assamica Bor

Species of legume

Gleditsia assamica is a species of flowering plant in the family Fabaceae that is found only in India. It is threatened by habitat loss from agricultural encroachment.
