= Gleditsia rolfei =

Conservation status
- Endangered (IUCN 2.3)

Scientific classification
- Kingdom: Plantae
- Clade: Tracheophytes
- Clade: Angiosperms
- Clade: Eudicots
- Clade: Rosids
- Order: Fabales
- Family: Fabaceae
- Subfamily: Caesalpinioideae
- Genus: Gleditsia
- Species: G. rolfei

Binomial name
- Gleditsia rolfei L.M.Vidal

Species of legume

Gleditsia rolfei is a leguminous tree in the family Fabaceae. It is found only in southern Taiwan, where it grows in the Hengchun Peninsula. It is threatened by habitat loss.
