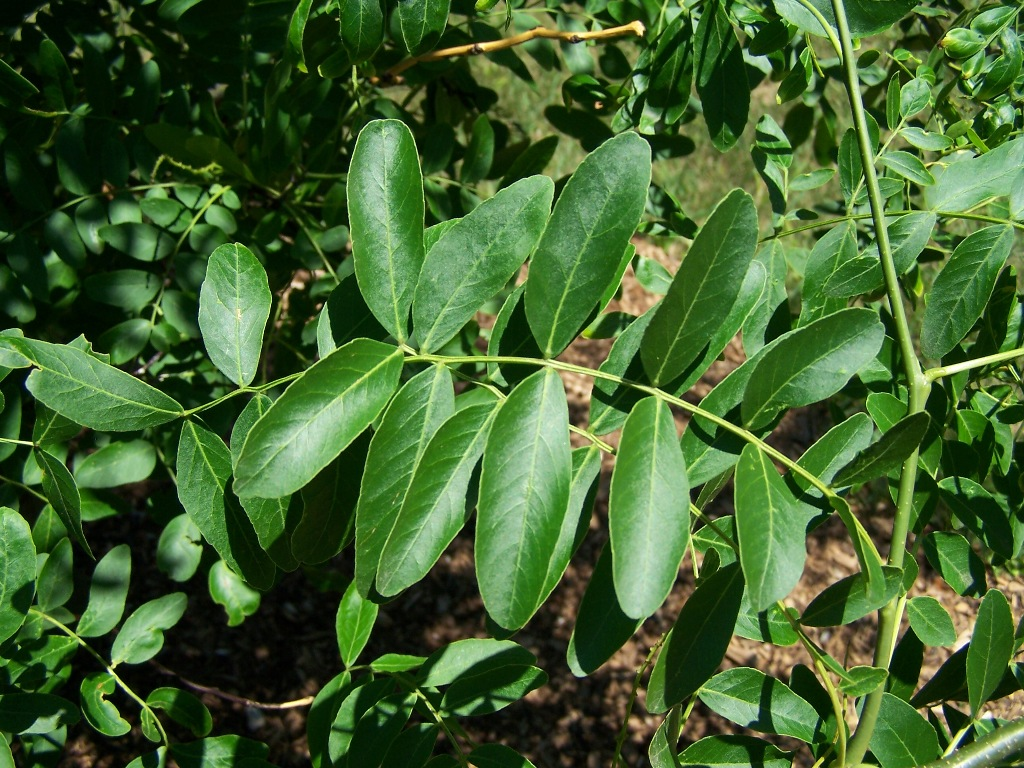

Scientific classification
- Kingdom: Plantae
- Clade: Tracheophytes
- Clade: Angiosperms
- Clade: Eudicots
- Clade: Rosids
- Order: Fabales
- Family: Fabaceae
- Subfamily: Caesalpinioideae
- Genus: Gleditsia
- Species: G. caspica

Binomial name
- Gleditsia caspica Desf.

= Gleditsia caspica =

Species of legume

Gleditsia caspica, the Caspian locust or Persian honeylocust, is a species of Gleditsia native to western Asia, in the Caucasus region of Azerbaijan and northern Iran, close to the Caspian Sea.

It is a medium-sized deciduous tree growing to 12 m tall, with the trunk covered in numerous, 10–20 cm long branched spines. The leaves are pinnate or bipinnate, up to 25 cm long, with 12–20 leaflets; bipinnate leaves have six to eight pinnae. The leaflets are up to 5 cm long and 2 cm broad. The flowers are greenish, produced in racemes up to 10 cm long. The fruit is a pod 20 cm long and 3 cm broad.

It is closely related to Gleditsia japonica (syn. G. horrida) from eastern Asia, and is treated as a subspecies of it by some botanists, Gleditsia horrida subsp. caspica (Desf.) J.Paclt.

== See also ==
- Gaz (candy)
