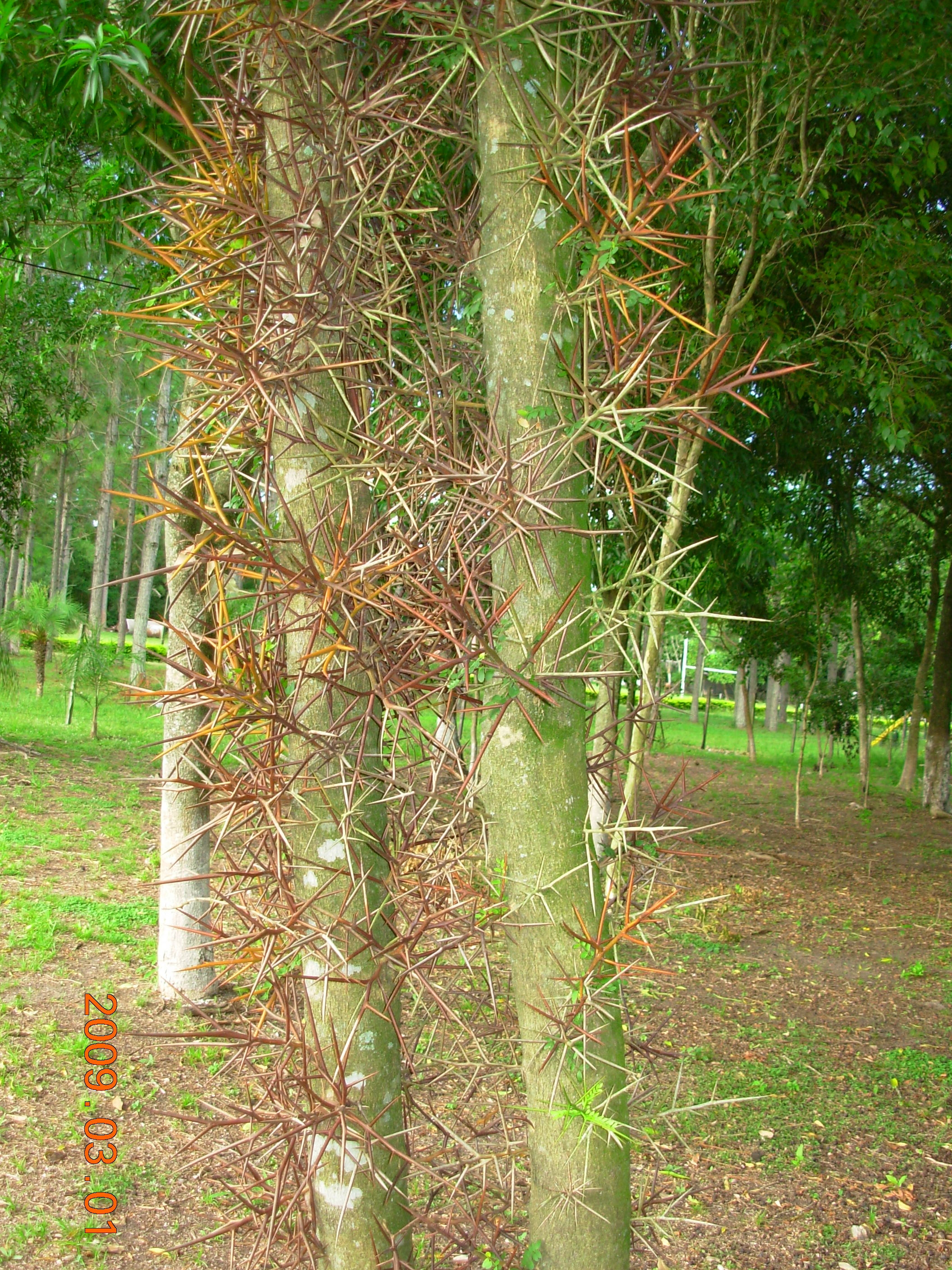
- Trunk of Gleditsia amorphoides.

Scientific classification
- Kingdom: Plantae
- Clade: Tracheophytes
- Clade: Angiosperms
- Clade: Eudicots
- Clade: Rosids
- Order: Fabales
- Family: Fabaceae
- Subfamily: Caesalpinioideae
- Genus: Gleditsia
- Species: G. amorphoides

Binomial name
- Gleditsia amorphoides (Griseb.) Taub.

Synonyms
- Garugandra amorphoides Griseb.; Gleditsia amorphoides var. anacantha Burkart

= Gleditsia amorphoides =

Species of tree

Gleditsia amorphoides common name Espina de Corona Cristi, is a tree in the subfamily Caesalpinoidae family Fabaceae. It is native to South America. This deciduous tree can reach heights of 10 to 20 meters. It has a dense, rounded crown that is somewhat small. The straight bole, which has a diameter of between 30 and 60 cm, is strongly armed with many long spines that can branch out to a length of more than 10 cm. Sometimes these thorns are up to 40 cm (16 in) in length. The tree is taken from its natural habitat for its lumber and useful gum. In addition to being used locally, the gum is also harvested commercially and used in the food industry. The plant is sometimes grown as a live fence and boundary marker.
