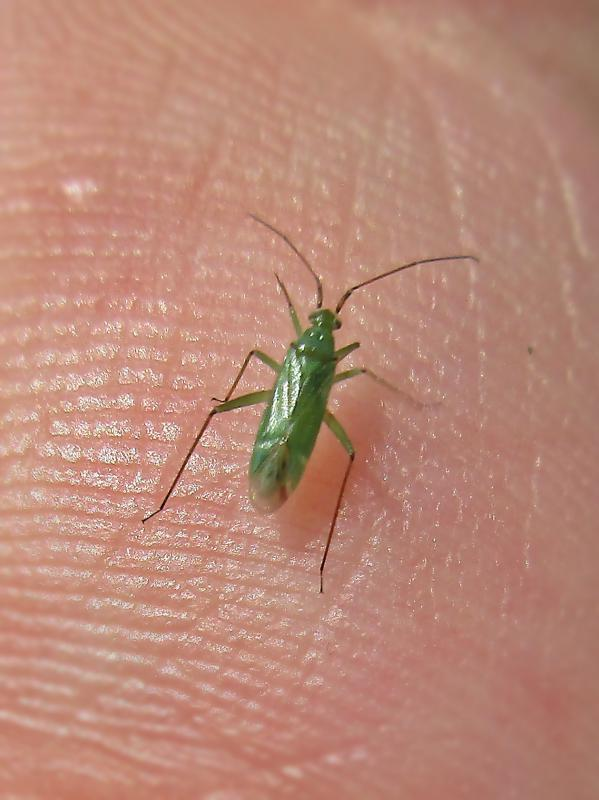
- Blepharidopterus angulatus

Scientific classification
- Kingdom: Animalia
- Phylum: Arthropoda
- Clade: Pancrustacea
- Class: Insecta
- Order: Hemiptera
- Suborder: Heteroptera
- Family: Miridae
- Subfamily: Orthotylinae
- Tribe: Orthotylini
- Genus: Blepharidopterus; Kolenati, 1845

Synonyms
- Diaphnocoris Kelton, 1961

= Blepharidopterus =

Genus of true bugs

Blepharidopterus is a genus of plant bugs in the family Miridae. There are about nine described species in Blepharidopterus.

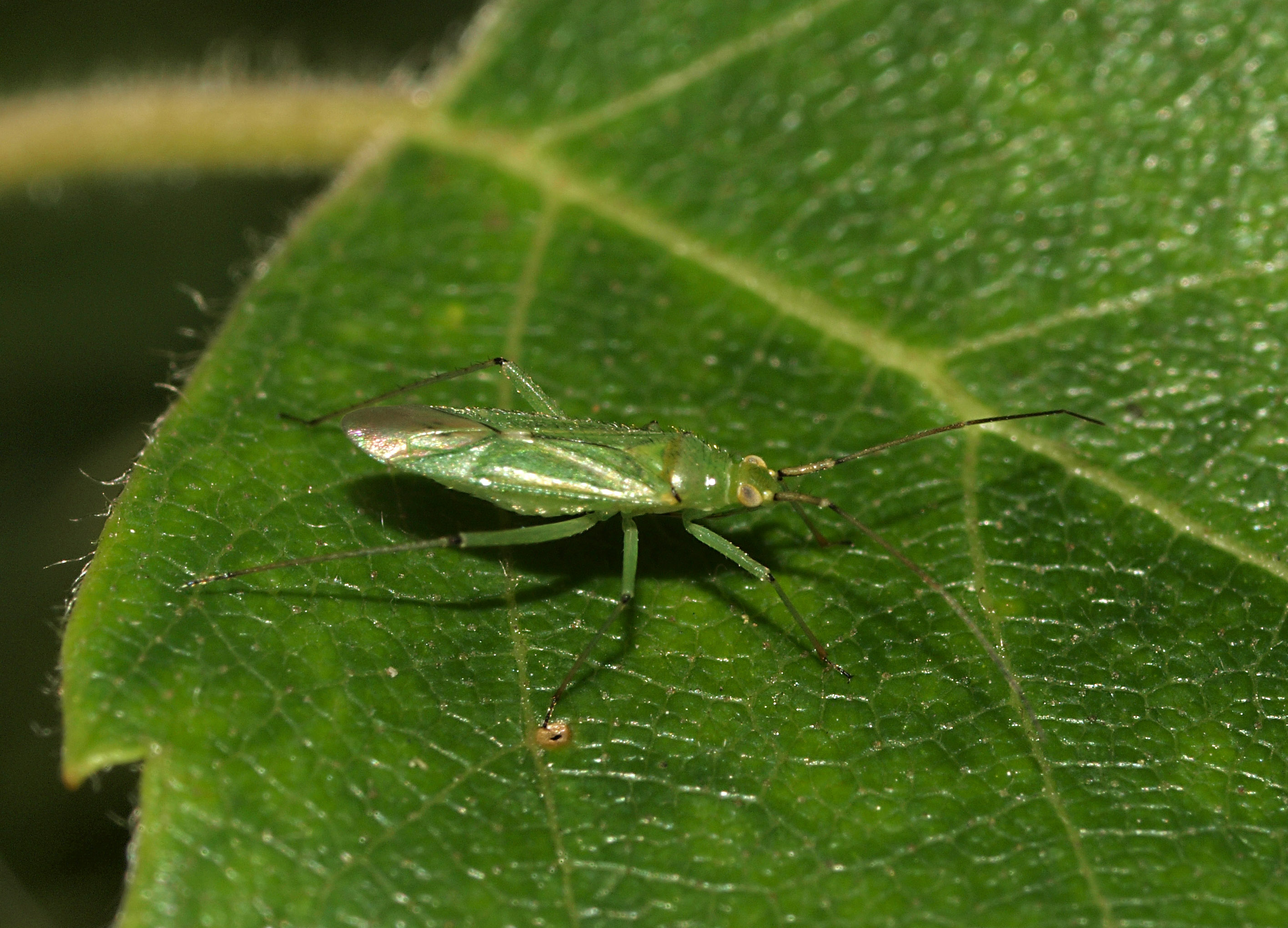
Blepharidopterus angulatus

== Species ==
These nine species belong to the genus Blepharidopterus:

- Blepharidopterus angulatus (Fallén, 1807) (black-kneed capsid)
- Blepharidopterus chlorionis (Say, 1832) (honeylocust plant bug)
- Blepharidopterus diaphanus (Kirschbaum, 1856)
- Blepharidopterus dubius Wagner, 1954
- Blepharidopterus mesasiaticus Josifov, 1993
- Blepharidopterus provancheri (Burque, 1887)
- Blepharidopterus striatus Yasunaga, 1999
- Blepharidopterus ulmicola Kerzhner, 1977
- Blepharidopterus victoris Drapolyuk, 1981
