= Blepharidopterus chlorionis =

Scientific classification
- Kingdom: Animalia
- Phylum: Arthropoda
- Clade: Pancrustacea
- Class: Insecta
- Order: Hemiptera
- Suborder: Heteroptera
- Family: Miridae
- Genus: Blepharidopterus
- Species: B. chlorionis

Binomial name
- Blepharidopterus chlorionis Say, 1832

Synonyms
- Diaphnocoris chlorionis Say, 1832

Species of insect

Blepharidopterus chlorionis, known commonly as the honeylocust plant bug and under the synonym Diaphnocoris chlorionis, is a hemipteran in the family Miridae. They are a major pest of the honey locust tree (Gleditsia triacanthos), a deciduous tree native to central North America.
