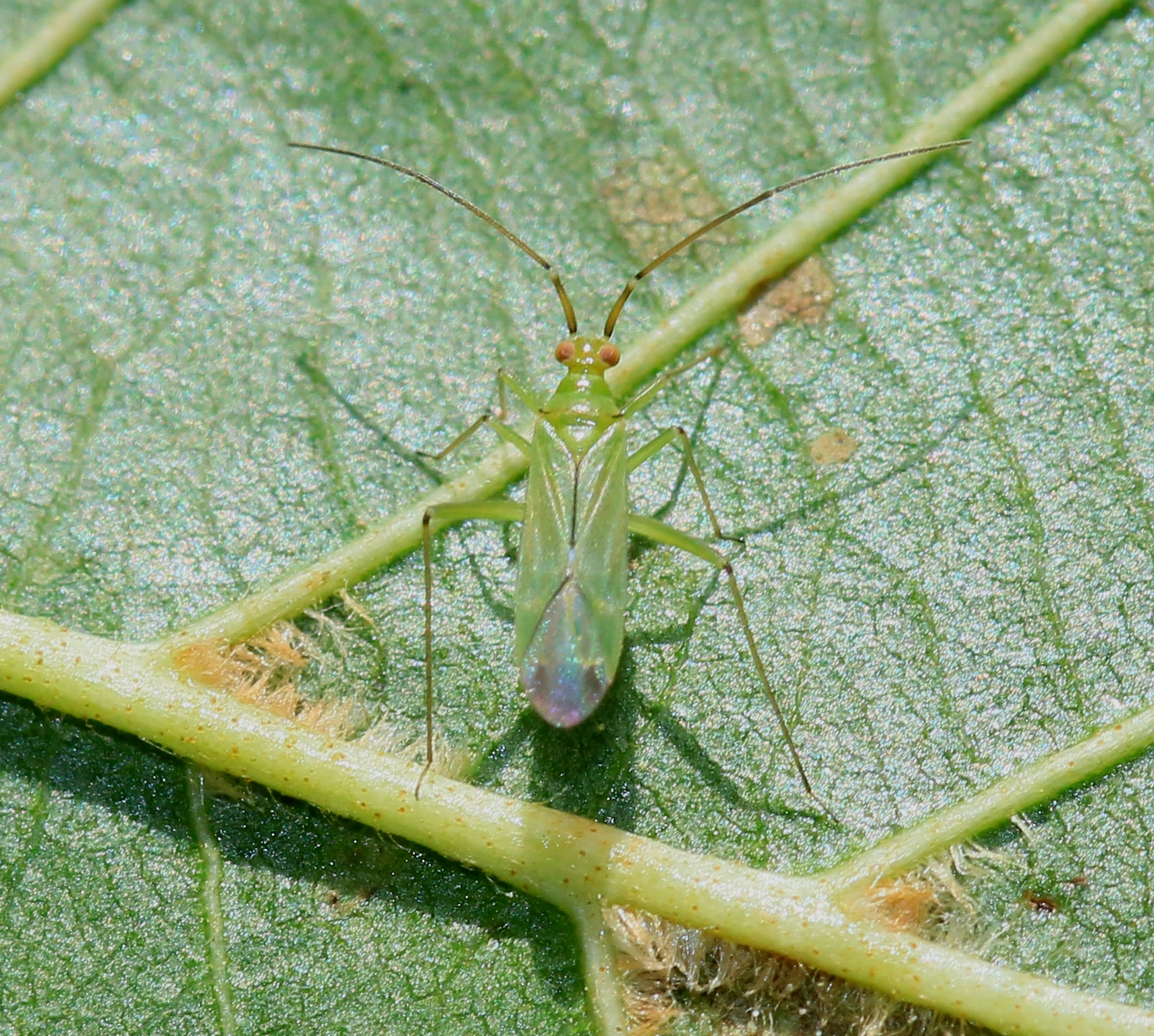

Scientific classification
- Kingdom: Animalia
- Phylum: Arthropoda
- Class: Insecta
- Order: Hemiptera
- Suborder: Heteroptera
- Family: Miridae
- Genus: Blepharidopterus
- Species: B. angulatus

Binomial name
- Blepharidopterus angulatus (Fallén, 1807)

Synonyms
- Lygaeus angulatus Fallén, 1807

= Blepharidopterus angulatus =

Species of true bug

Blepharidopterus angulatus, the black-kneed capsid, is a species of plant bug in the family Miridae. It is found in North Africa, Europe East across the Palearctic to Central Asia and in North America.

== Biology ==
The bugs feed mainly as predators of mites, mite eggs, aphids and other soft-bodied arthropods on various deciduous trees and shrubs. They are found mainly on Alnus, Betula, Corylus, Fraxinus, Ulmus, Tilia, Salix, Populus, Carpinus and Fagus. Occasionally suck also on the immature seeds of the plants.

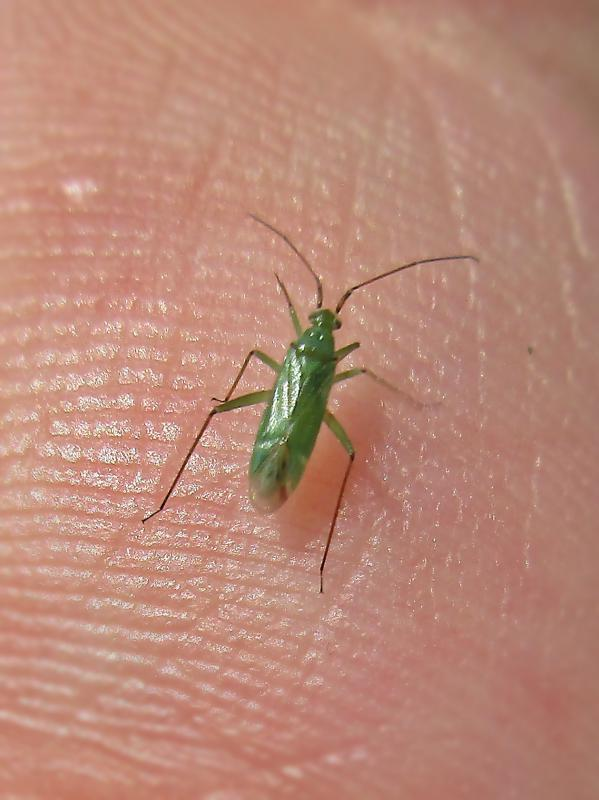
Blepharidopterus angulatus showing size Arnhem, the Netherlands

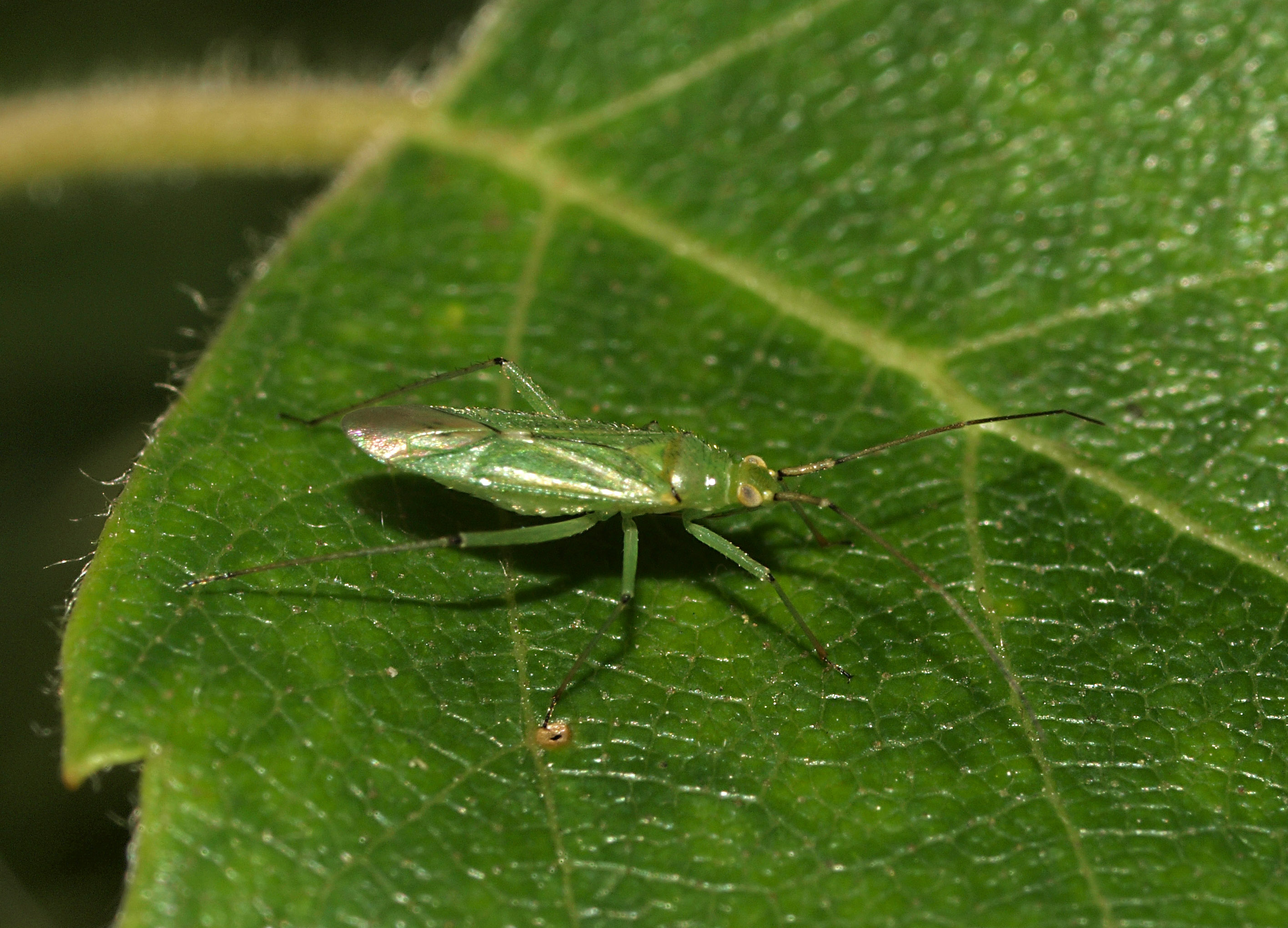
Blepharidopterus angulatus on Silver Birch

B. angulatus has one generation per year. Eggs are laid from July to October in the wood of trees where they remain embedded until the following spring. Nymphal stages develop in 35 to 39 days. Adult females can deposit up to 43 eggs, their life span is 51 days. Up to 4000 mites can be consumed by a female, or about 50 mites per day. This species feeds on plant tissue, but it does not cause injury on plants.
