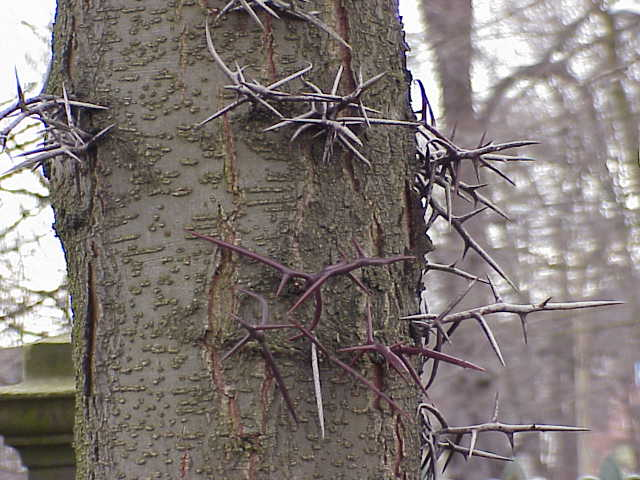
- Gleditsia sinensis trunk with thorns

Scientific classification
- Kingdom: Plantae
- Clade: Embryophytes
- Clade: Tracheophytes
- Clade: Angiosperms
- Clade: Eudicots
- Clade: Rosids
- Order: Fabales
- Family: Fabaceae
- Subfamily: Caesalpinioideae
- Genus: Gleditsia
- Species: G. sinensis

Binomial name
- Gleditsia sinensis Lam.

= Gleditsia sinensis =

Species of legume

Gleditsia sinensis, known as zào jiá (皂荚) or Chinese honey locust and black locust (Note: Common names can vary based on location and often cause confusion and misidentification. "Black locust" is also used as a common name for Robinia pseudoacacia. Gleditsia sinensis is also referred to "honey locust" in English.) in English, is a species of flowering plant native to Asia.

== Description ==
Zao jia grows as a tree up to 30 m tall. Spines are often branching and are robust, terete, conical and up to 16 cm in length. Leaves are pinnate. Flowers are yellowish-white and polygamous with male flowers being 9–10 mm in diameter and bisexual flowers being 10–12 mm in diameter with slightly longer petals and sepals. Flowers have 4 petals and 4 sepals.

== Etymology ==
In China, Gleditsia sinensis is commonly known as zào jiá (traditional Chinese: 皂莢; simplified Chinese: 皂荚). The English equivalents include Chinese honey locust (or Chinese honeylocust), soap bean and soap pod.

== Taxonomy ==
Zao jia is one of 14 species in the Gleditsia genus in the Caesalpinioideae subfamily of the legume family. Of these, Gleditsia caspica is the closest phylogenetic relative of G. sinensis.

== Traditional medicine ==
It is one of the "50 fundamental herbs" used in traditional Chinese medicine. Gleditsia sinensis has been used in China for more than 2,000 years as a detergent. The thorns of Gleditsia sinensis are used as a medicinal herb in China and Korea and may have anti-tumor properties. The thorns of Gleditsia sinensis LAM. (Leguminosae) have been used in traditional medicine for the treatment of inflammatory diseases including swelling, suppuration, carbuncle, and skin diseases.

== See also ==
- Soaproot
- Soaptree
- Soapwort
