= Johann Gottlieb Gleditsch =

German physician and botanist

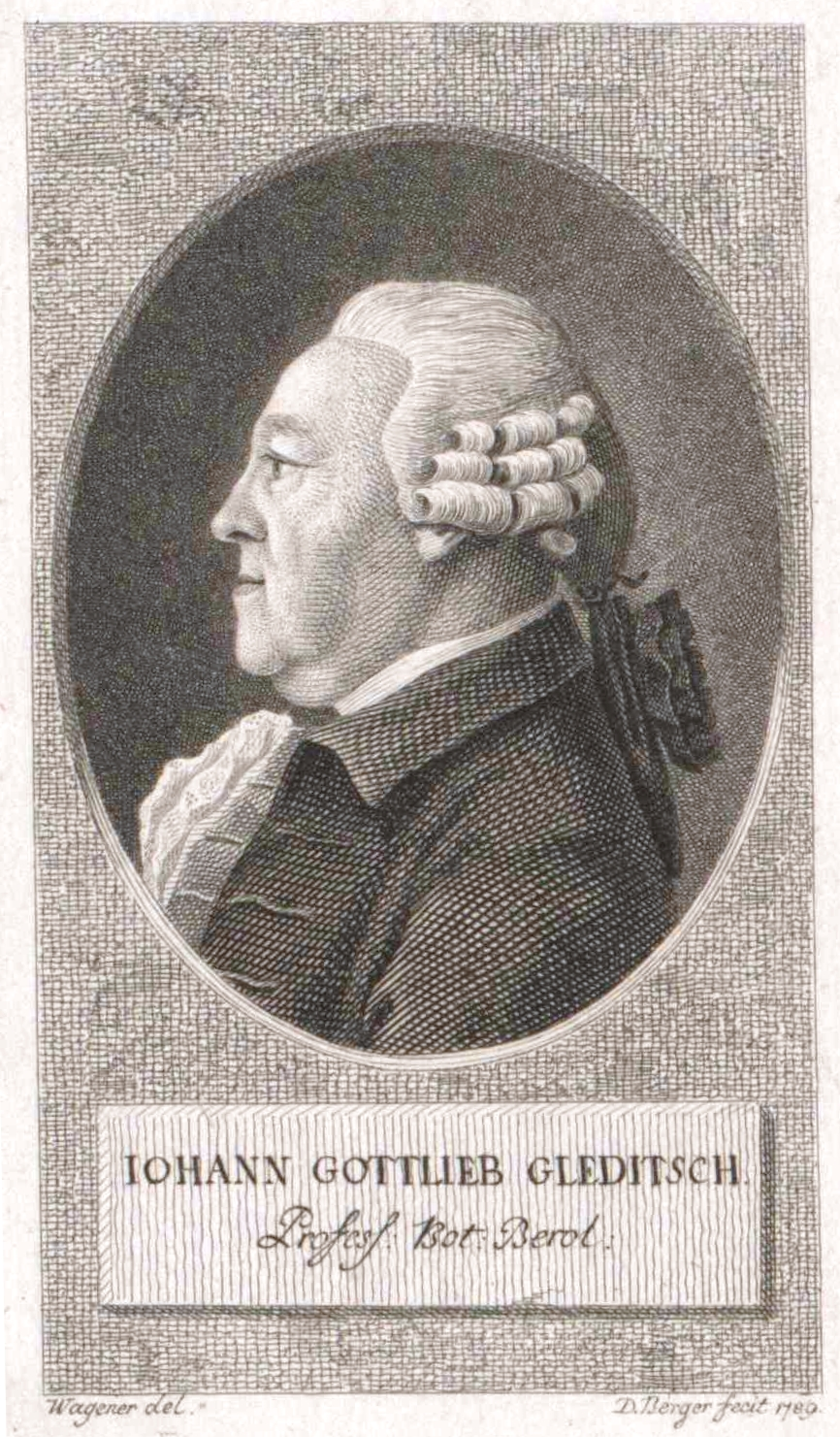
Johann Gottlieb Gleditsch (1714-1786)

Johann Gottlieb Gleditsch (5 February 1714, in Leipzig – 5 October 1786, in Berlin) was a German physician and botanist known for pioneer investigations of plant sexuality and reproduction.

== Biography ==
He studied medicine and other subjects at the University of Leipzig (1728–35), where one of his instructors was the naturalist Johann Ernst Hebenstreit (1703–1757). From 1742, he gave lectures in physiology, botany and materia medica at the University of Frankfurt, afterwards relocating to Berlin as a professor of botany at the Collegium Medico-chirurgicum and director of the local botanical garden. Beginning in 1770, he gave lectures at the recently established institute of forestry, where he was instrumental in providing a scientific basis for the field of forestry.

In his experiments involving plant movement, he demonstrated the influence that climatic factors had upon plant organs. Also, his view on the role that insects play in pollination of plants was considered to be ahead of its time.

The botanical genus Gleditsia (family Fabaceae) is named in his honor, as is the botanical journal Gleditschia. In Berlin-Schöneberg, a thoroughfare called Gleditschstraße bears his name.

== Selected works ==
- "Consideratio Epicriseos Siegesbeckianae in Linnaei Systema Plantorum Sexuale Et Methodum Botanicam Huic Superstructam", 1740 – dissertation in which Gleditsch recognized the importance of the Linnean System.
- "Methodus Fungorum", 1753.
- "Systema plantarum a staminum situ Systema plantarum a staminum situ", 1764.
- Vermischte physicalisch-botanisch-oeconomische Abhandlungen, 1765 – Mixed physical-botanical-economic treatises.
- Systematische Einleitung in die neuere, aus ihren eigenthümlichen physikalisch-ökonomischen Gründen hergeleitete Forstwissenschaft (two volumes, 1775) – Systematic introduction to the newly (due to unique physical-economic reasons) derived forestry.
