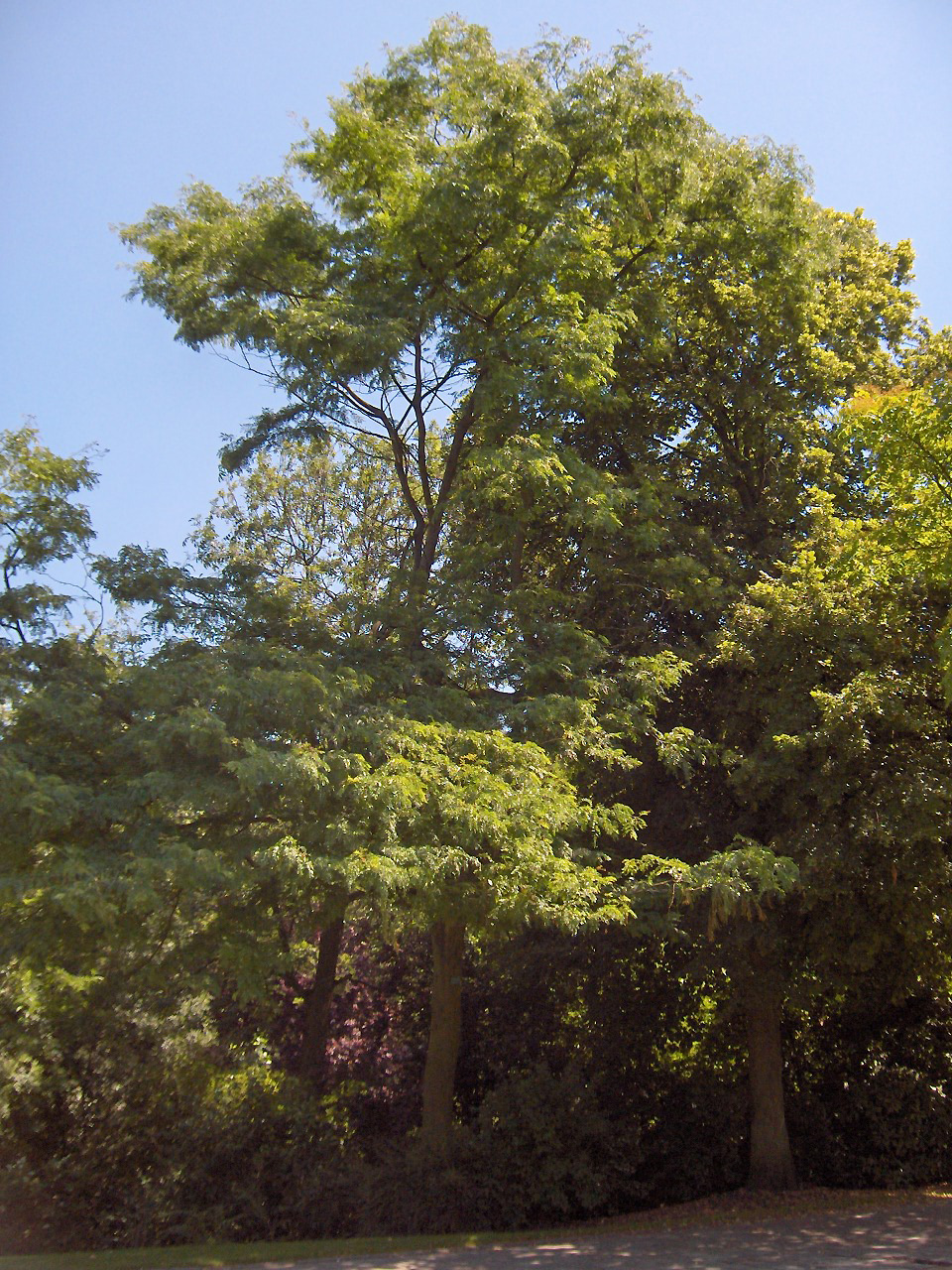
- Thorny honey locust (Gleditsia triacanthos)

Scientific classification
- Kingdom: Plantae
- Clade: Tracheophytes
- Clade: Angiosperms
- Clade: Eudicots
- Clade: Rosids
- Order: Fabales
- Family: Fabaceae
- Subfamily: Caesalpinioideae
- Genus: Gleditsia; L. (1753)

Synonyms
- Asacara Raf. (1825); Caesalpiniodes Kuntze (1891), nom. superfl.; Garugandra Griseb. (1879); Gleditschia Scop.; Garugandra Griseb. (1879); Melilobus Mitch. (1769); Pogocybe Pierre (1899)

= Gleditsia =

Genus of legumes

Gleditsia /ɡlɪˈdɪtsiə/ (honey locust) is a genus of trees in the family Fabaceae, subfamily Caesalpinioideae, native to the Americas and Asia. The Latin name commemorates Johann Gottlieb Gleditsch, director of the Berlin Botanical Garden, who died in 1786.

== Species ==
There are 12 species:

- Gleditsia amorphoides (Griseb.) Taubert
- Gleditsia aquatica Marshall – water locust or swamp locust
- Gleditsia assamica Bor
- Gleditsia australis F. B. Forbes & Hemsley
- Gleditsia caspica Desf. – Caspian locust or Persian honeylocust
- Gleditsia fera (Lour.) Merr.
- Gleditsia japonica Miq. – Japanese honey locust
- Gleditsia medogensis Z.C.Ni
- Gleditsia microphylla D.Gordon ex Y.T.Lee
- Gleditsia rolfei S.Vidal
- Gleditsia sinensis Lam. – Chinese honey locust
- Gleditsia triacanthos L. – thorny honey locust

Hybrids

- Gleditsia × texana Sarg. – Texas honey locust (=G. aquatica × triacanthos)

All the species are woody except for G. microphylla. Their ability to fix nitrogen is debated; see Honey locust § Nitrogen fixation.

== Range and taxonomy ==
Gleditsia is found in East Asia, on the East Coast of the Americas, and in South America; small populations of certain species also exist around the Caspian Sea (G. caspica) and India (G. assamica). There are native species to all these regions. The theory is that Gleditsia originated in East Asia in the Eocene, crossed the land bridge across the North Pacific Ocean into North America, and then spread down to South America millions of years later. Gymnocladus is a sister genus of Gleditsia, and it too mimicked this dispersion pattern, except it came to the Americas much earlier. Though there are no extant European Gleditsia species, there are fossils found in Europe which could mean that the genus also crossed the North Atlantic land bridge.

Certain Gleditsia species are in clades with species from other continents; an example is G. caspica (from the Caucusus), G. delavayi, and G. japonica (both from Asia), who are in a clade together. Gleditsia amorphoides is the most basal of the genus, most closely related to G. sinensis but not the North American species (G. aquatica and G. triacanthos).

== Medicinal use ==
Gleditsia sinensis is one of the 50 fundamental herbs used in Chinese herbology, where it is called zào jiá (皂荚).

== Bibliography ==
- Philips, Roger. (1979). Trees of North America and Europe, Random House, Inc., New York ISBN 0-394-50259-0.
- Media related to Gleditsia at Wikimedia Commons
