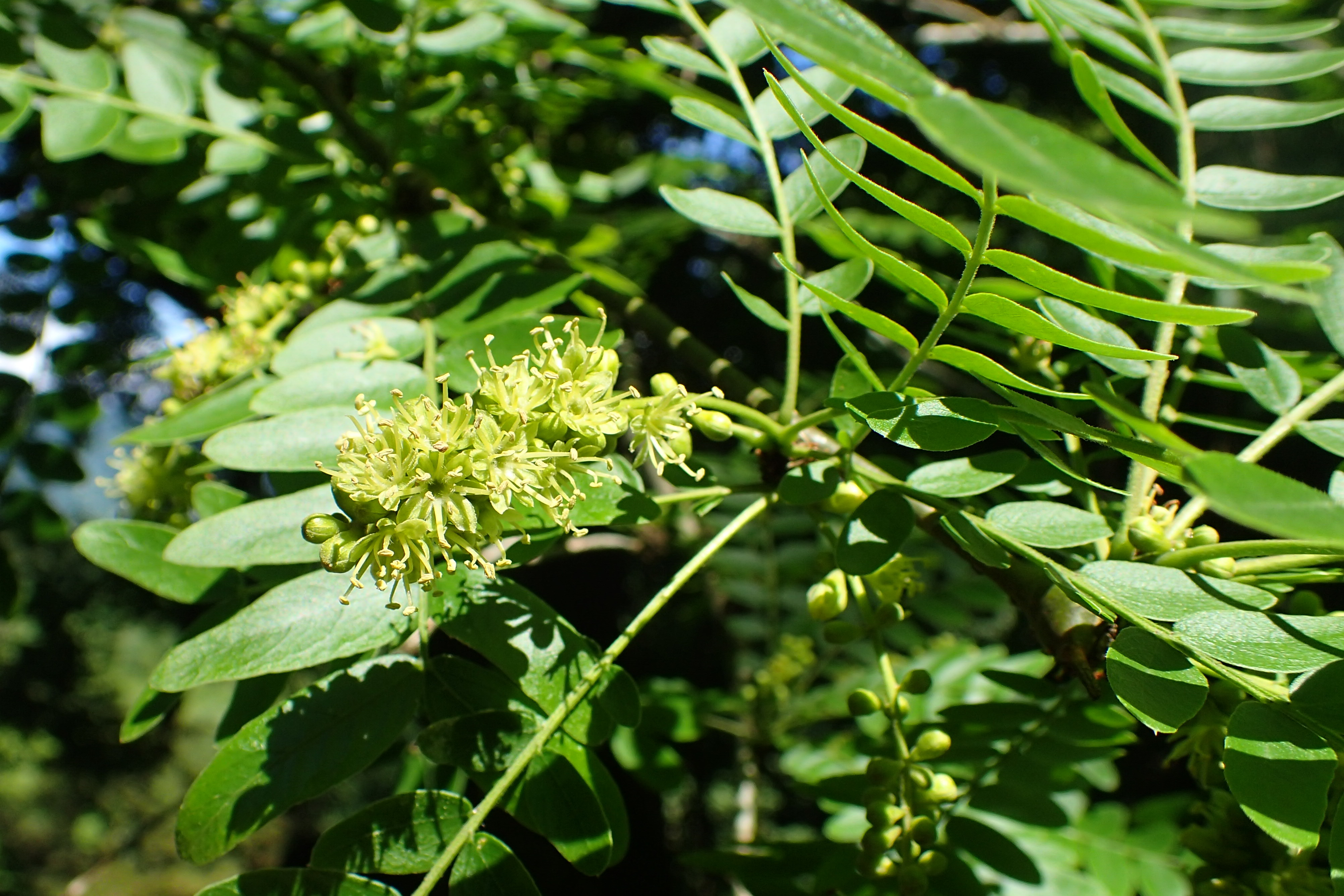
- Flowers
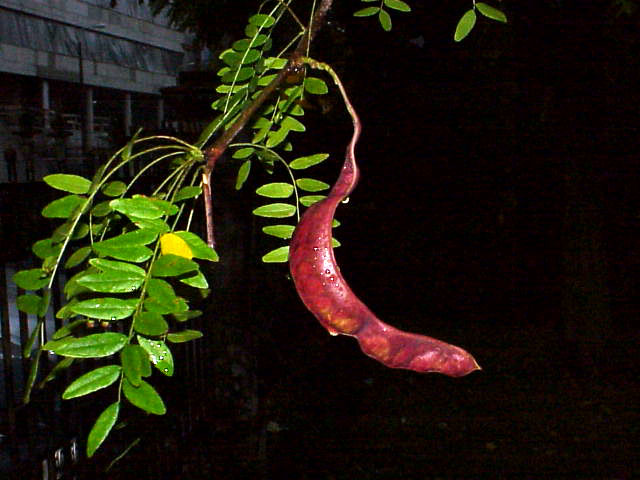
- Seed pod

Scientific classification
- Kingdom: Plantae
- Clade: Embryophytes
- Clade: Tracheophytes
- Clade: Spermatophytes
- Clade: Angiosperms
- Clade: Eudicots
- Clade: Rosids
- Order: Fabales
- Family: Fabaceae
- Subfamily: Caesalpinioideae
- Genus: Gleditsia
- Species: G. japonica

Binomial name
- Gleditsia japonica Miq.

Synonyms
- List: Caesalpiniodes japonicum (Miq.) Kuntze; Fagara horrida Thunb.; Gleditsia coccinea Koehne; Gleditsia delavayi Franch.; Gleditsia horrida subsp. delavayi (Franch.) Paclt; Gleditsia horrida subsp. velutina (L.C.Li) Paclt; Gleditsia koraiensis Nakai; Gleditsia vestita Chun & F.C.How ex B.G.Li; Zanthoxylum horridum (Thunb.) DC.

= Gleditsia japonica =

Species of flowering plant

Gleditsia japonica, the Japanese locust, is a species of flowering plant in the family Fabaceae, native to the eastern Himalayas, central and southern China, Manchuria, Korea, and central and southern Japan. It is used as a street tree in a number of cities in China and Europe.

== Subtaxa ==
The following varieties are accepted:

- Gleditsia japonica var. delavayi (Franch.) L.C.Li – eastern Himalayas, south-central China
- Gleditsia japonica var. japonica – southeastern China, north-central China, Manchuria, Korea, Japan
- Gleditsia japonica var. stenocarpa (Nakai) Nakai – Korea
- Gleditsia japonica var. velutina L.C.Li – southeastern China
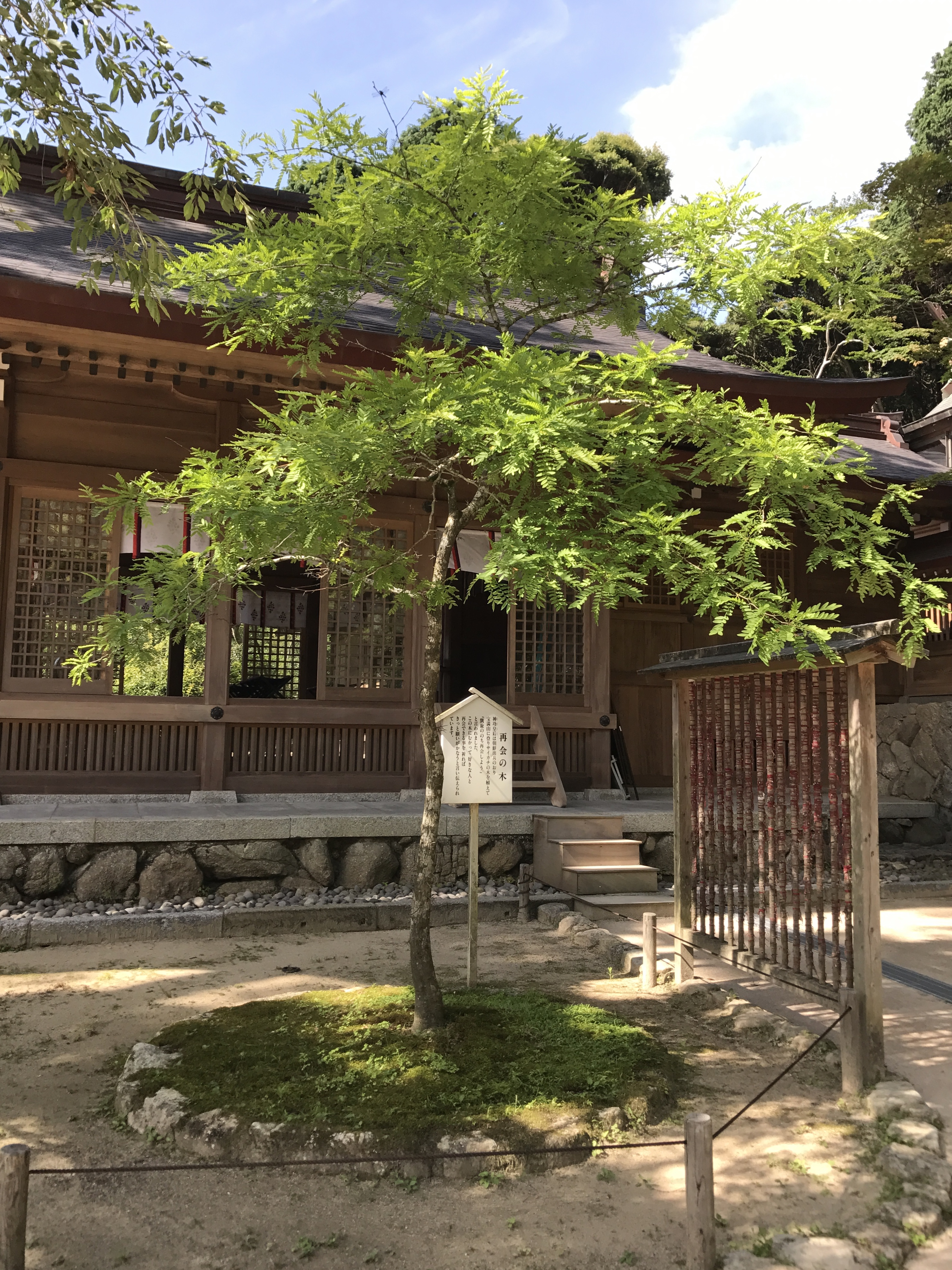
At a shrine in Kyushu, Japan

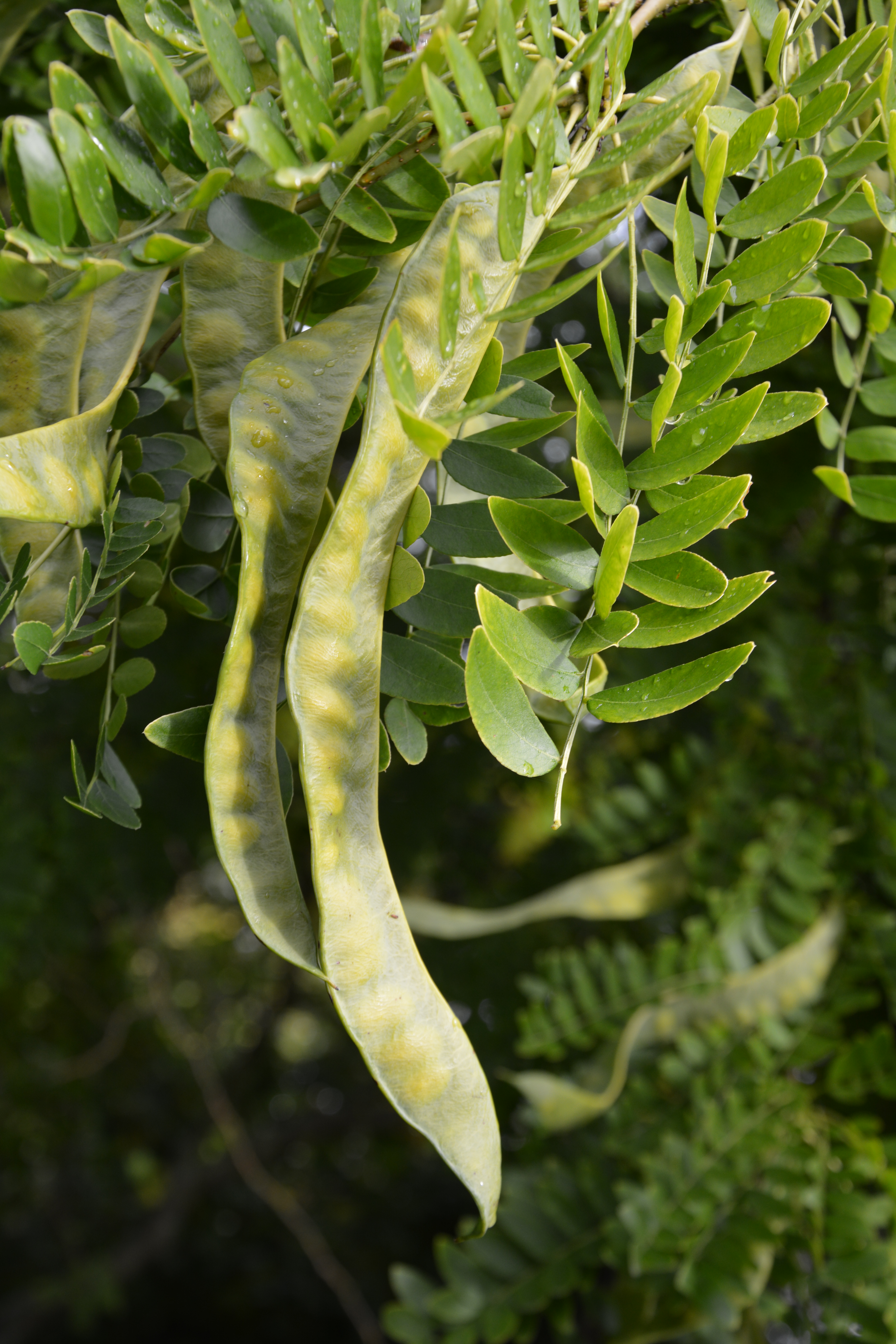
Unripe pods

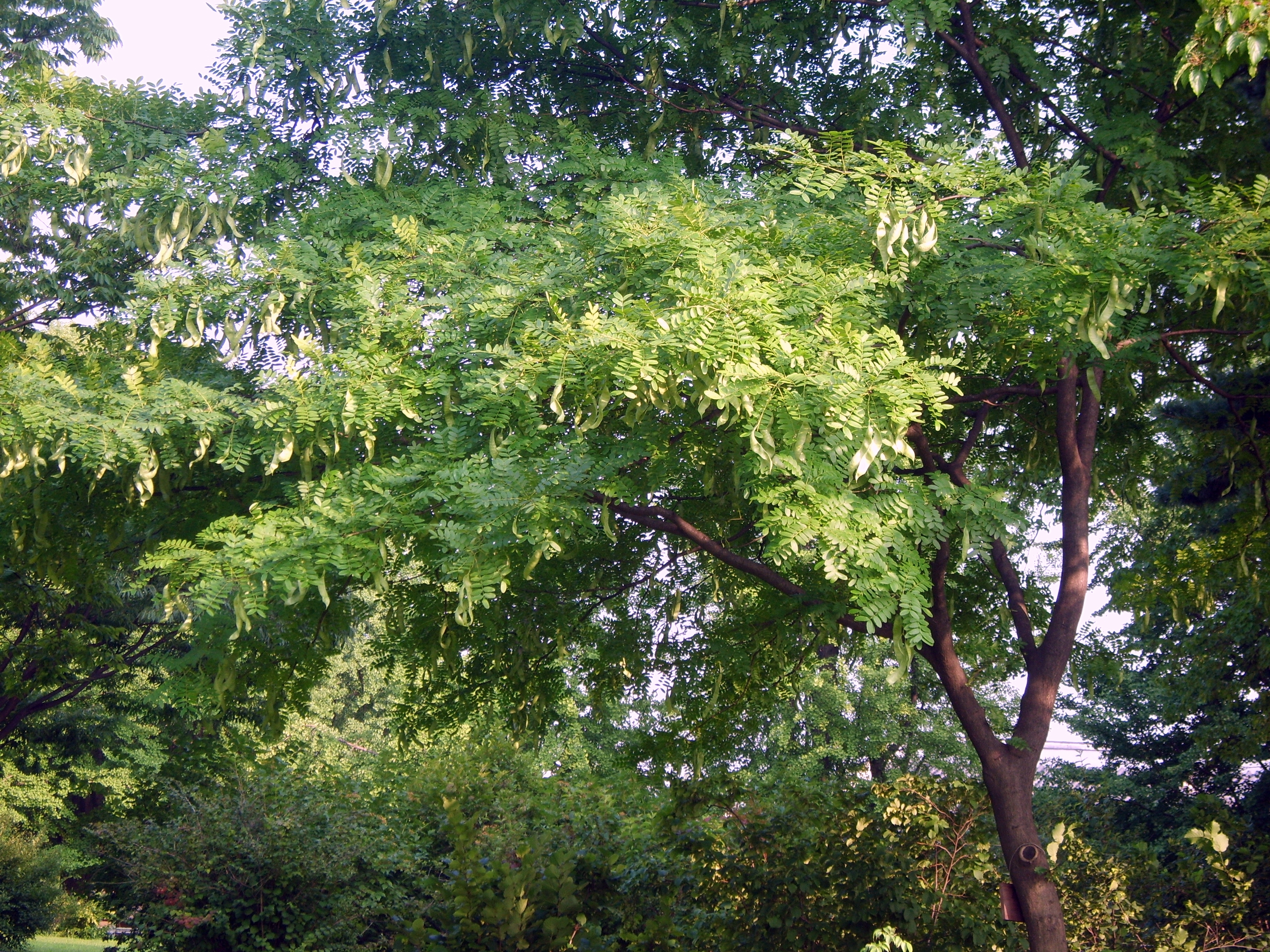
A young individual in Korea

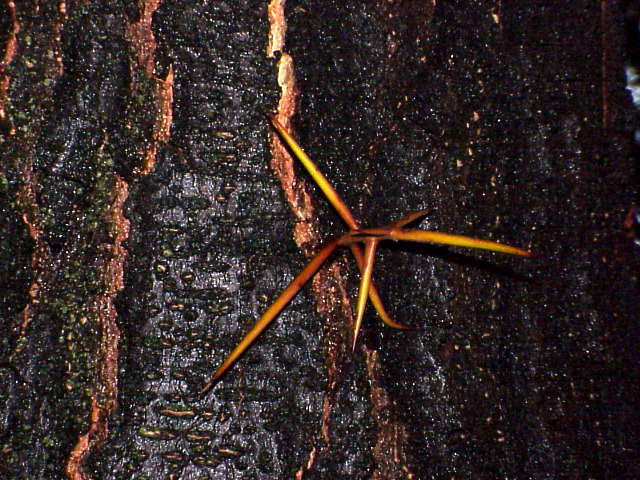
Thorns
