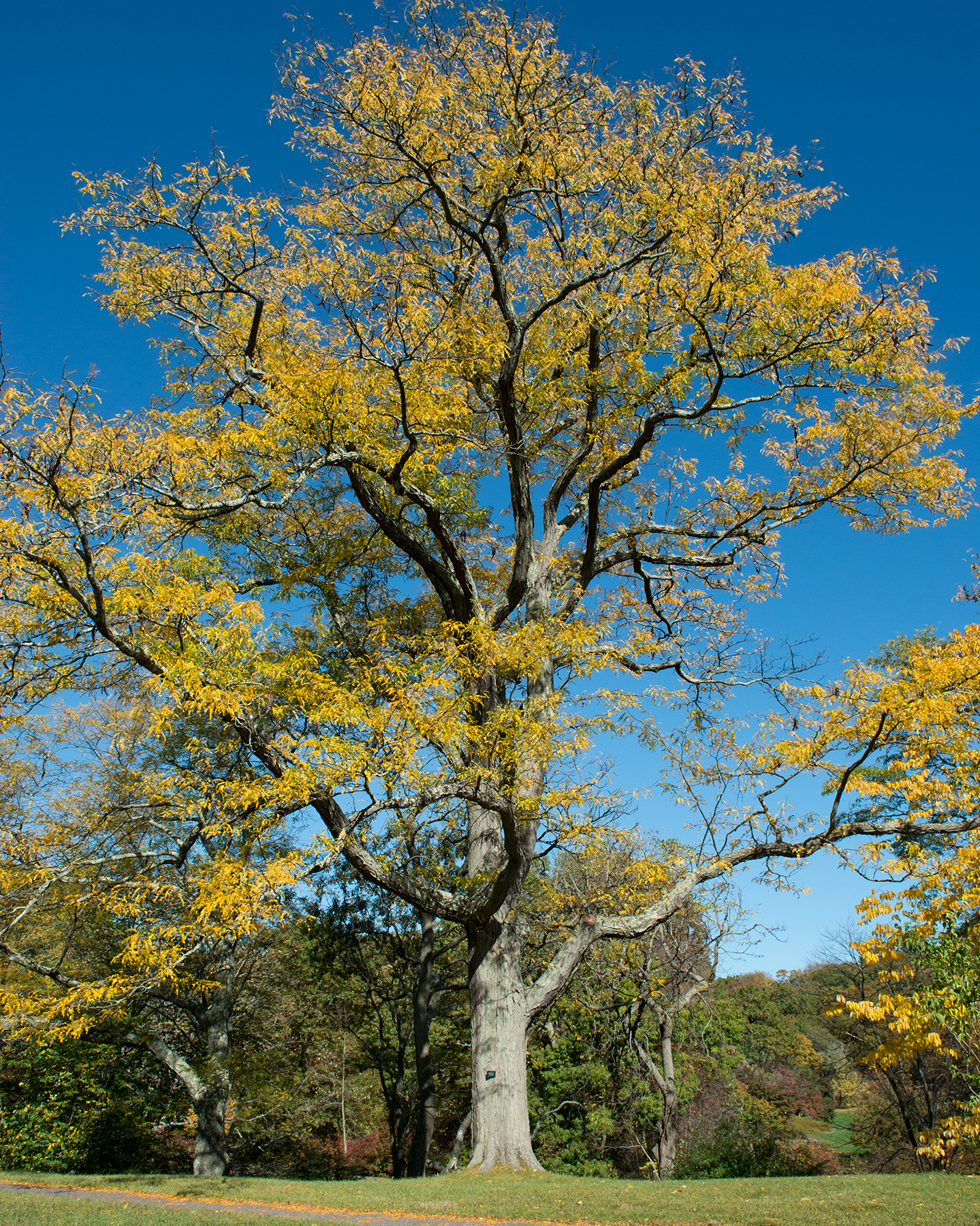
- A cultivated honey locust showing fall color

Conservation status
- Least Concern (IUCN 3.1)

- Secure (NatureServe)

Scientific classification
- Kingdom: Plantae
- Clade: Tracheophytes
- Clade: Angiosperms
- Clade: Eudicots
- Clade: Rosids
- Order: Fabales
- Family: Fabaceae
- Subfamily: Caesalpinioideae
- Genus: Gleditsia
- Species: G. triacanthos

Binomial name
- Gleditsia triacanthos L.
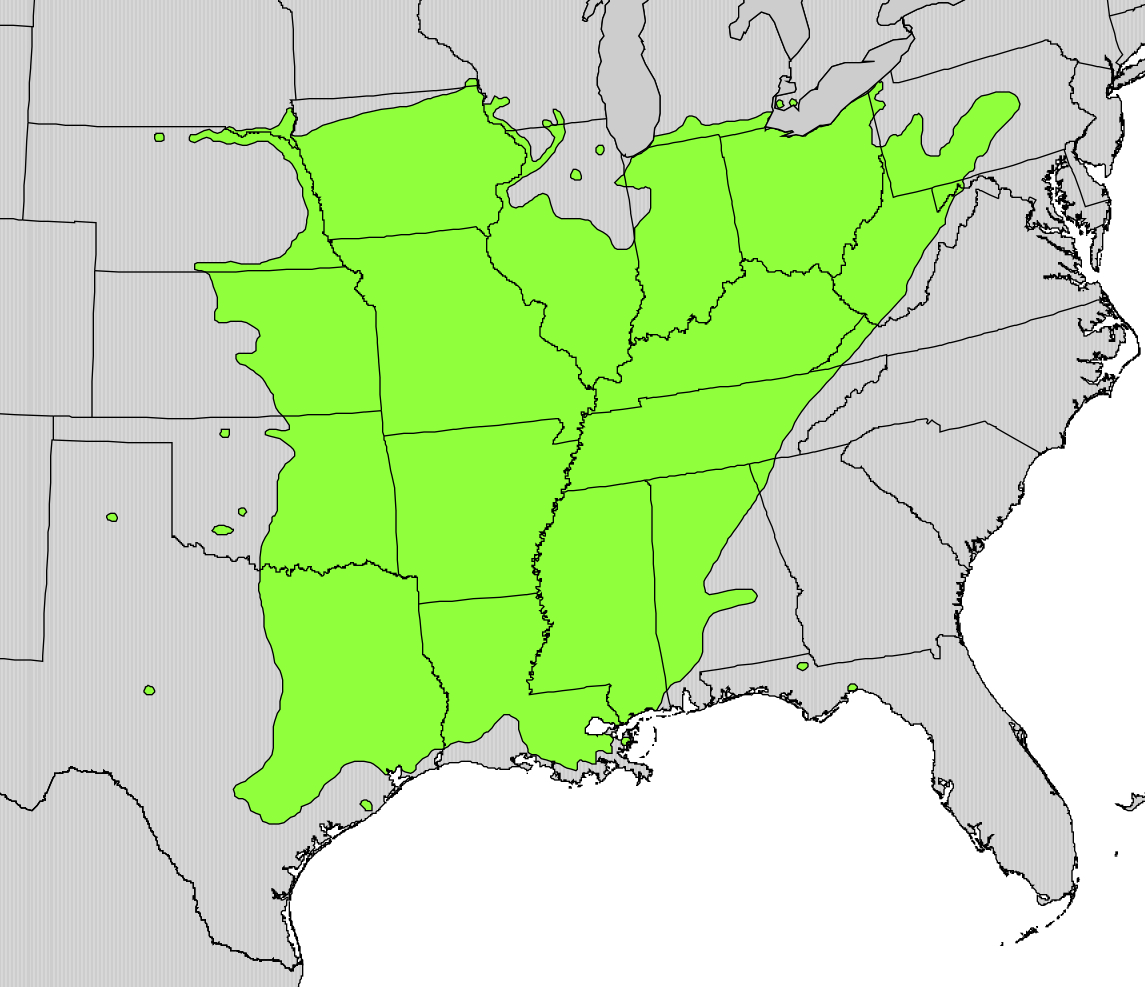
- Native range

Synonyms
- List: Acacia villaregalis McVaugh (1987); Caesalpiniodes heterophyllum (Raf.) Kuntze (1891); Caesalpiniodes triacanthum (L.) Kuntze (1891); Gleditsia brachycarpos (Michx.) Pursh (1813); Gleditsia bujotii Neumann (1846); Gleditsia bujotii pendula Van Geert . nud.; Gleditsia bujotii var. pendula Rehder o syn.; Gleditsia elegans Salisb. perfl.; Gleditsia excelsa-pendula de Vos (1887); Gleditsia ferox Desf. (1809); Gleditsia ferox var. nana (Loudon) Rehder (1900); Gleditsia flava K.Koch (1869); Gleditsia heterophylla Raf. (1817); Gleditsia horrida (Aiton) Salisb. (1796); Gleditsia inermis var. elegantissima Grosdem. (1905); Gleditsia laevis G.Don (1830); Gleditsia latisiliqua Lodd. ex G.Don (1830); Gleditsia meliloba Walter (1788); Gleditsia micracantha de Vos (1887); Gleditsia mimosifolia Lodd. ex Talou ubnud.; Gleditsia mimosifolia var. pendula Talou publ.; Gleditsia polysperma (Aiton) Stokes (1812); Gleditsia sinensis var. nana Loudon (1838); Gleditsia spinosa Marshall (1785); Gleditsia triacanthos f. brachycarpos (Michx.) C.K.Schneid. (1907); Gleditsia triacanthos f. elegantissima (Grosdem.) Rehder (1949); Gleditsia triacanthos f. inermis (Castigl.) Zabel (1903); Gleditsia triacanthos f. nana (Loudon) Rehder (1949); Gleditsia triacanthos f. pendula (Asch. & Graebn.) Rehder (1949); Gleditsia triacanthos lusus pendula Asch. & Graebn. (1907); Gleditsia triacanthos var. brachycarpos Michx. (1803); Gleditsia triacanthos var. bujotii (Neumann) Rehder (1900); Gleditsia triacanthos var. ferox (Desf.) Asch. & Graebn. (1907); Gleditsia triacanthos var. horrida Aiton (1789); Gleditsia triacanthos var. inermis Castigl. (1790); Gleditsia triacanthos var. laevis K.Koch (1853); Gleditsia triacanthos var. macrocarpos Michx. (1803); Gleditsia triacanthos var. nana (Loudon) A.Henry (1912); Gleditsia triacanthos var. polysperma Aiton (1789); Melilobus heterophyla Raf. (1838); Vachellia villaregalis (McVaugh) Seigler & Ebinger 2006)

= Honey locust =

Species of tree native to central North America

The honey locust (Gleditsia triacanthos), also known as the thorny locust or thorny honeylocust, is a deciduous tree in the family Fabaceae, native to central North America where it is mostly found in the moist soil of river valleys. Honey locust trees are highly adaptable to different environments, and the species has been introduced worldwide. Outside its natural range it can be an aggressive, damaging invasive species.

== Description ==
The honey locust, Gleditsia triacanthos, can reach a height of 20–30 m (65–100 ft). They exhibit fast growth, but live a medium life span, as long as 125 years. The leaves are pinnately compound on older trees but bipinnately compound on vigorous young trees. The leaflets are 1.4–3.6 cm (1/2–1 1/2 in) long when compound and very slightly smaller when bipinnate. The leaves are green in summer and turn yellow in autumn in shades ranging from cream and tan to golden yellow. Honey locusts leaf out relatively late in spring, but generally slightly earlier than the black locust (Robinia pseudoacacia).

The strongly scented flowers appear in late spring. Each cluster is a raceme 3–7 centimeters long with many tiny greenish-yellow to greenish-white flowers. The trees are polygamous-dioecious: many trees have only pollen producing flowers or seed producing flowers (strictly dioecious), but some will have both types of flowers in separate clusters, though usually one type will predominate.

The fruit of the honey locust is a flat pod (a legume) that matures in early autumn and is often twisted or curved. The average size of the pods is 7–35 cm (3–14 in) long and 1.5–3 cm (1/2–1 1/4 in) wide. Once ripe the pod will contain as many as twenty dark brown oval seeds, each about 2 cm (1 in) long. Surrounding the seeds is a soft, gooey pulp with a slightly sweet flavor. Pods may be produced from mid-September through mid-October in its native habitat.

Honey locusts commonly have thorns 6–10 cm (2 1/2–4 in) long growing out of the branches and trunk, some reaching lengths of 20 cm (8 in); these may be single, or branched into several points, and commonly form dense clusters. The thorns are modified branches and occasionally sprout leaves. Thornless forms are occasionally found growing wild and are commonly available as nursery plants.

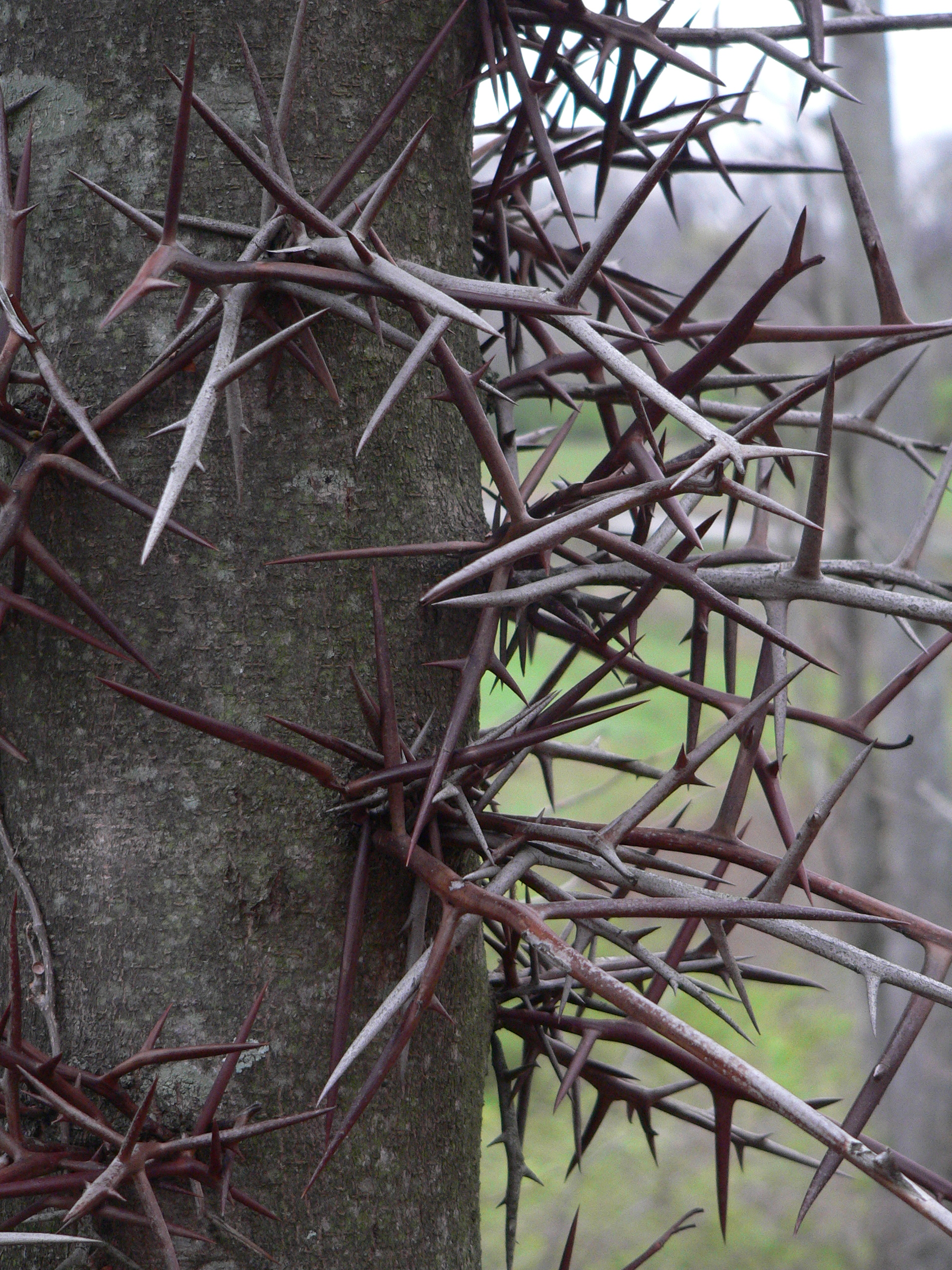
Detail of thorns

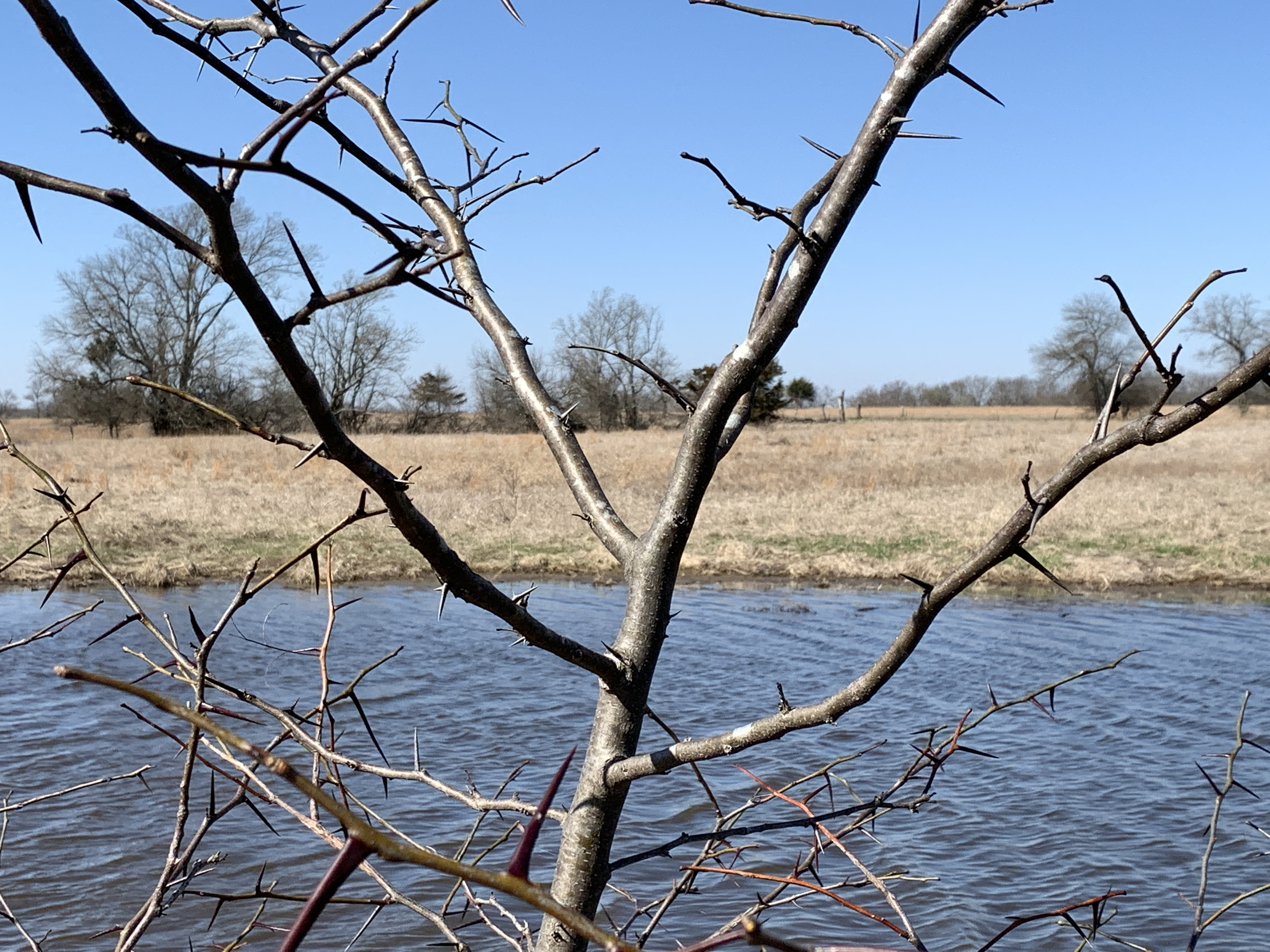
Honey locust tree thorns in Kansas

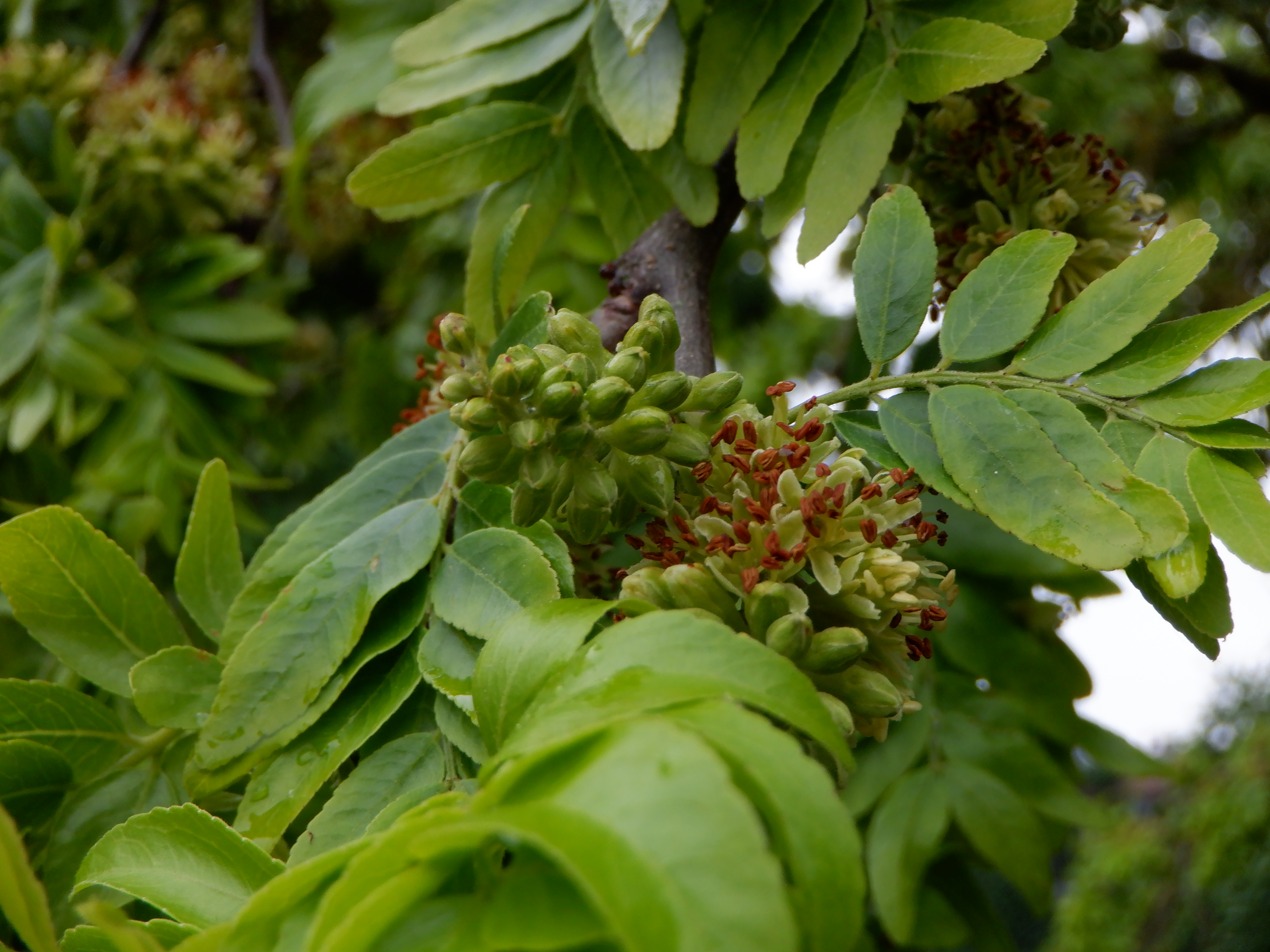
Detail of flowers

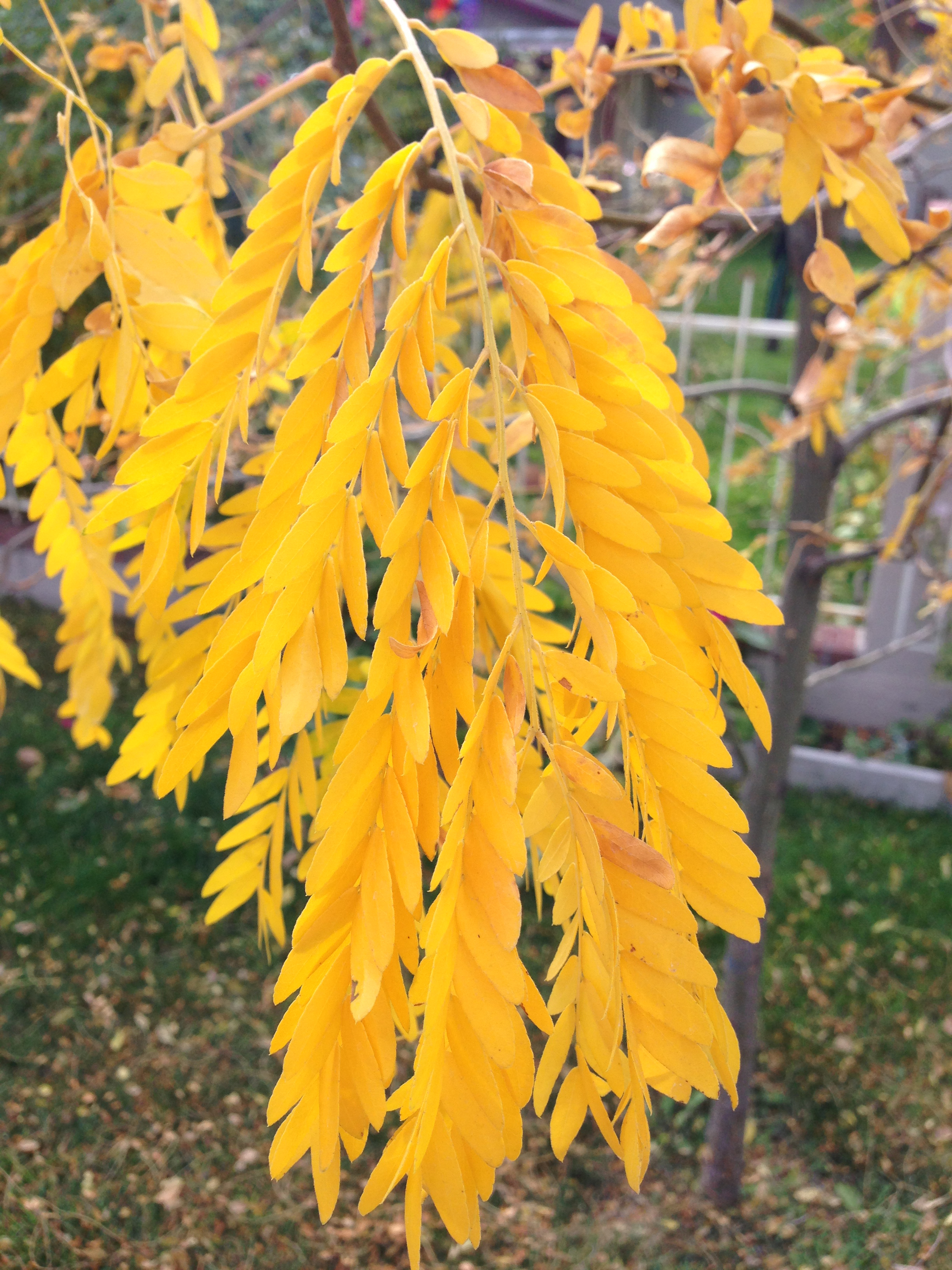
Autumn leaf color

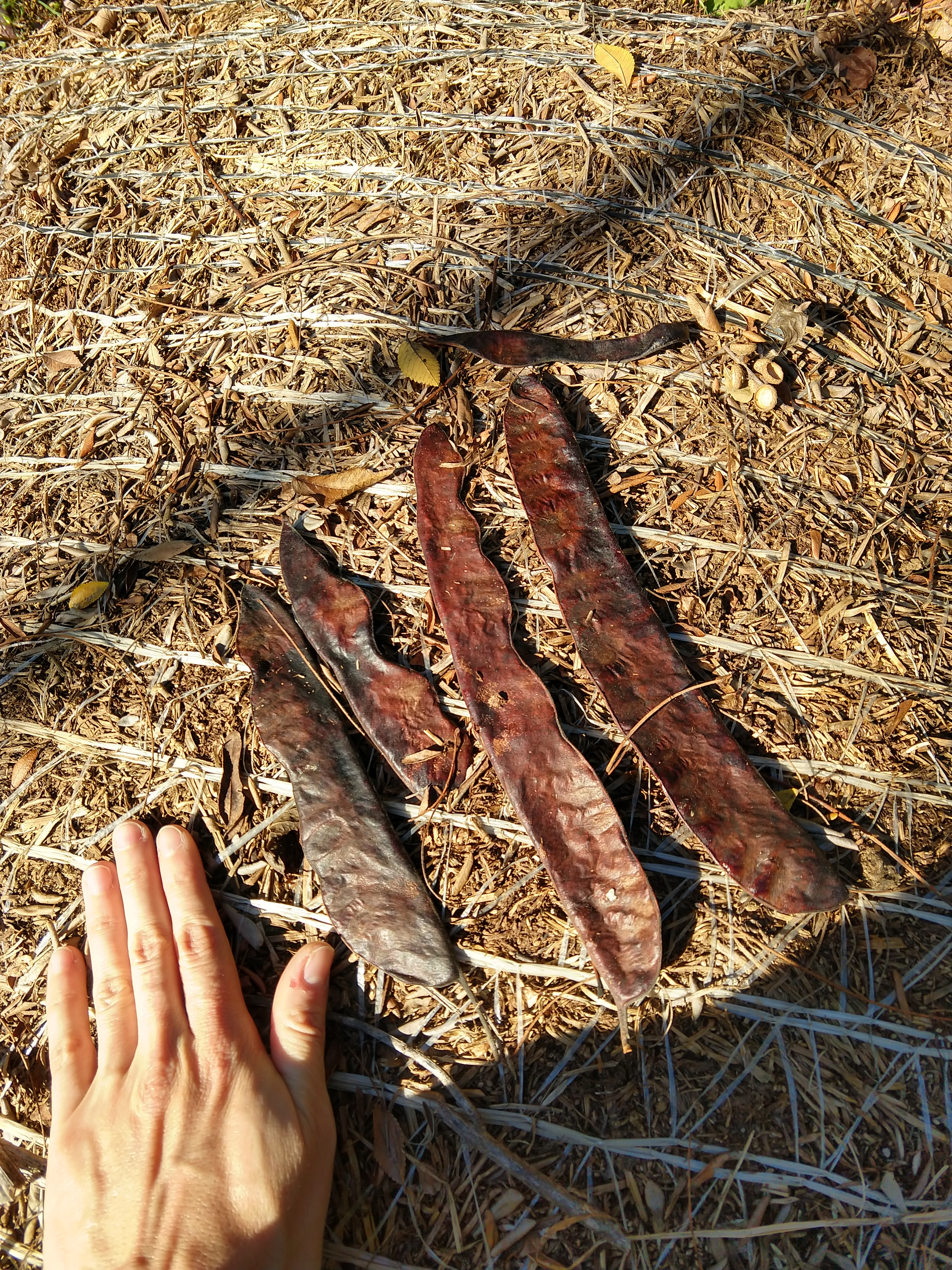
Mature honeylocust fruits

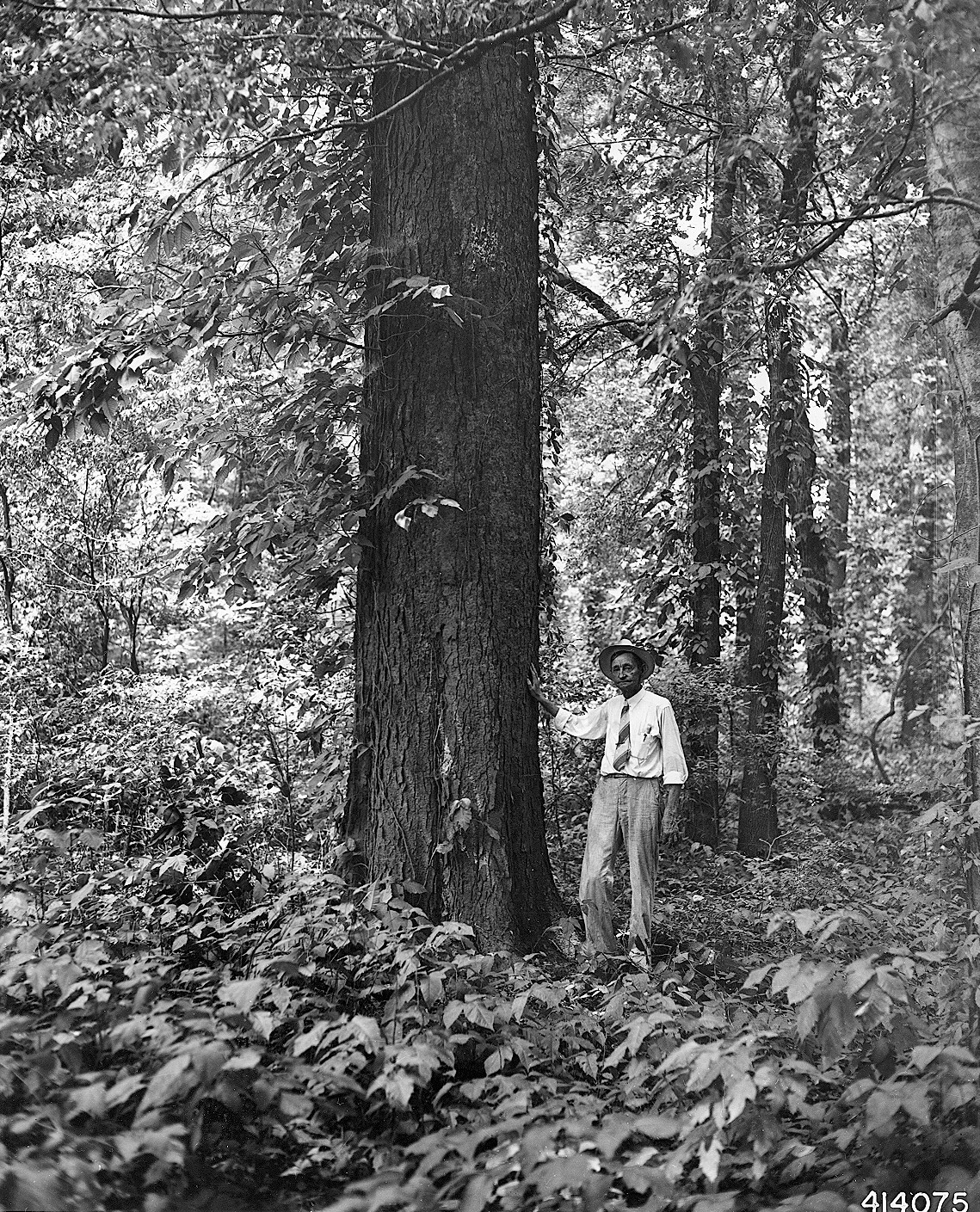
Old growth honeylocust tree in Tennessee, US, 1941

== Taxonomy ==
Honey locust was given its scientific name of Gleditsia triacanthos by Carl Linnaeus in 1753 in his book Species Plantarum. Its taxonomic history is quite complex with a total of 41 names that are taxonomic synonyms including five botanical forms, fourteen varieties, and twenty-two species. Included in its synonyms by Plants of the World Online, World Flora Online, and the USDA Natural Resources Conservation Service PLANTS database is the subordinate taxon Gleditsia triacanthos var. inermis. However, this scientific name is still found in gardening websites and books to distinguish thornless trees.

Table of Synonyms
Name	Year	Rank	Notes
Acacia villaregalis McVaugh	1987	species	= het.
Caesalpiniodes heterophyllum (Raf.) Kuntze	1891	species	= het.
Caesalpiniodes triacanthum (L.) Kuntze	1891	species	≡ hom.
Gleditsia brachycarpos (Michx.) Pursh	1813	species	= het.
Gleditsia bujotii Neumann	1845	species	= het.
Gleditsia bujotii var. pendula Rehder	1900	variety	= het., pro syn.
Gleditsia bujotii pendula Van Geert	1857		= het., nom. nud.
Gleditsia elegans Salisb.	1796	species	≡ hom., nom. superfl.
Gleditsia excelsa-pendula de Vos	1887	species	= het.
Gleditsia ferox Desf.	1809	species	= het.
Gleditsia ferox var. nana (Loudon) Rehder	1900	variety	= het.
Gleditsia flava K.Koch	1869	species	= het.
Gleditsia heterophylla Raf.	1817	species	= het.
Gleditsia horrida (Aiton) Salisb.	1796	species	= het.
Gleditsia inermis var. elegantissima Grosdem.	1905	variety	= het.
Gleditsia laevis G.Don	1830	species	= het.
Gleditsia latisiliqua Lodd. ex G.Don	1830	species	= het.
Gleditsia meliloba Walter	1788	species	= het.
Gleditsia micracantha de Vos	1887	species	= het.
Gleditsia mimosifolia Lodd. ex Talou	1859	species	= het., nom. subnud.
Gleditsia mimosifolia var. pendula Talou	1859	variety	= het., not validly publ.
Gleditsia polysperma (Aiton) Stokes	1812	species	= het.
Gleditsia sinensis var. nana Loudon	1838	variety	= het.
Gleditsia spinosa Marshall	1785	species	= het.
Gleditsia triacanthos var. brachycarpos Michx.	1803	variety	= het.
Gleditsia triacanthos f. brachycarpos (Michx.) C.K.Schneid.	1907	form	= het.
Gleditsia triacanthos var. bujotii (Neumann) Rehder	1900	variety	= het.
Gleditsia triacanthos f. elegantissima (Grosdem.) Rehder	1949	form	= het.
Gleditsia triacanthos var. ferox (Desf.) Asch. & Graebn.	1907	variety	= het.
Gleditsia triacanthos var. horrida Aiton	1789	variety	= het.
Gleditsia triacanthos var. inermis Castigl.	1790	variety	= het.
Gleditsia triacanthos f. inermis (Castigl.) Zabel	1903	form	= het.
Gleditsia triacanthos var. laevis K.Koch	1853	variety	= het.
Gleditsia triacanthos var. macrocarpos Michx.	1803	variety	= het.
Gleditsia triacanthos var. nana (Loudon) A.Henry	1912	variety	= het.
Gleditsia triacanthos f. nana (Loudon) Rehder	1949	form	= het.
Gleditsia triacanthos f. pendula (Asch. & Graebn.) Rehder	1949	form	= het.
Gleditsia triacanthos lusus pendula Asch. & Graebn.	1907	sport	= het.
Gleditsia triacanthos var. polysperma Aiton	1789	variety	= het.
Melilobus heterophyla Raf.	1838	species	= het.
Vachellia villaregalis (McVaugh) Seigler & Ebinger	2005	species	= het.
Notes: ≡ homotypic synonym; = heterotypic synonym

Hybridization of honey locust with water locust (Gleditsia aquatica) has been reported.

=== Names ===
The genus Gleditsia is named in honor of Johann Gottlieb Gleditsch, the director of what has become the Berlin Botanical Garden and Botanical Museum. The species name is derived from Greek and means "three thorns". The common name most often used for the species is "honey locust". This name comes from the slightly sweet pulp that surrounds the seeds in the tree's pods and their resemblance to the pods of the carob or "locust tree" from the Middle East. Honey locust is also used for the genus as a whole or for other species in it. The first recorded use of the name was in 1709 by John Lawson in his account A New Voyage to Carolina. In the late 1800s honey locust was sometimes used as an alternate name in localized areas for other species such as for mesquit (Prosopis juliflora) in Texas and New Mexico, for black locust (Robinia pseudoacacia) in Minnesota, and for clammy locust (Robinia viscosa) in New York and New Jersey. Variants on this name include "common honey locust", "honeylocust", and "thornless honey locust".

Though honey locust is the most commonly used name for the species in English, it has a variety of other names. Some of these many names include "honey shucks locust", "sweet bean tree", "sweet locust", "thorny locust", and "green locust tree". In South Africa it is called "driedoringboom", driedoring-gleditsia", soetpeulboom", "springkaanboom", or "leoka".

In the late 1800s it was known by additional local names including "black locust" (MS, TX, AR, KS, NB), "three-thorned acacia" (MA, RI, LA, TX, MI, NB, ON), "thorntree" (NY, IN, LA), "thorny acacia" (TN), and "piquant amourette" (LA).

== Range and habitat ==
The native range of the honey locust is widely agreed to be from northern Mexico through the Gulf Coast of the United States, northwards into the Midwest, parts of the US East Coast, and the southernmost parts of Canada. In Canada it is a rare forest species found in southern Ontario near Lake Huron, Ontario, or Erie. However, Plants of the World Online (POWO) lists it as introduced to Ontario while NatureServe and World Plants list it as native. It is listed as native to Nova Scotia by World Plants, but as introduced by POWO and not recorded by NatureServe. It is also recorded by NatureServe as growing as an introduced plant on Prince Edward Island.

In the midwest it grows very widely in Illinois, Indiana, Ohio, and Missouri and is much rarer and scattered in Wisconsin, Minnesota, and North Dakota. In Kansas it grows naturally in the eastern half of the state, and at the eastern and northern edge of Nebraska along the Missouri River, a small area of South Dakota, and the southern portion of Michigan.

In the eastern United States honey locust trees are regarded as native to Connecticut, Massachusetts, New Hampshire, Rhode Island, and New York. Though the botanist Elbert Luther Little showed the range as extending naturally into Pennsylvania, NatureServe list it as introduced to that state. They likewise list it as introduced to Maine, Vermont, and New Jersey, while both POWO and World Plants list it as native to all of them.

In the American South, only NatureServe lists it as introduced to Delaware and the District of Columbia, while World Plants lists it as native to both. Plants of the World Online does not list it as growing wild in Washington, D.C. It is listed as growing natively through all the rest of the south, though Elbert Luther Little's range map does not show it growing east of the Appalachian Mountains. Also, in Florida it is only shown as growing in a few isolated areas of the Florida Panhandle.

To the west it grows throughout eastern Texas and Oklahoma, while becoming scattered and isolated to the west. It is listed as introduced to New Mexico by POWO, but native in Wyoming, Utah, and Nevada. Contradicting this, NatureServe list it as native to New Mexico, while introduced in Colorado, Wyoming, Utah, and Nevada. Only World Plants lists it as native to many western states including Arizona, California, Colorado, Idaho, Montana, New Mexico, Nevada, Utah, and Wyoming.

In Mexico it grows in four states; Coahuila, Nuevo León, Sonora, and Tamaulipas. Trees in Mexico are much smaller than those in the center of its range, reaching a maximum size of just 12 m (39 ft) and less than 6 m (20 ft) in some populations. They are also found in isolated locations growing on south facing slopes at elevations of 1,170 to 1,400 m (3,840 to 4,590 ft).

Worldwide it has become established outside of cultivation in Europe, southern Asia, Australia, southern Africa, and in Argentina and Uruguay.

In its native range the honey locust grows in humid or subhumid climates. It grows best in soils that are organically rich and moist, but well-drained. However, it is tolerant of a wide range of soil conditions. It is intolerant of shade and is a minor component of forests.

== Ecology ==
The sweet pulp in honey locust seed pods is attractive as a food for many animals including cattle, deer, rabbits, squirrels, and hares. White-tailed deer are known to disperse the seeds of honey locust by consuming the pods and passing the seeds in their dung. It is likely that deer move the seeds over one kilometer from where they are eaten, though probably not more than three kilometers and aid the tree in reaching new habitats and maintaining its wild population even in fragmented habitats. The seeds themselves are consumed by crows in the winter.

The size and number of thorns on the honey locust are thought to have evolved to protect the trees from browsing Pleistocene megafauna, including mastodons, which may also have been involved in seed dispersal.

The seeds of the honey locust are resistant to sprouting without damage to the seed coat. In controlled experiments only 5% of the seeds sprout without treatment. In comparison, seeds soaked in concentrated sulfuric acid for one and a half hours increased germination to 68% and two and a half hours increases it to 98%.

The honey locust moth (Syssphinx bicolor) feeds on honey locust and Kentucky coffee trees while a caterpillar. The first brood of the moths emerge from hibernation in the ground in the late spring. The green larvae have several horns on the backs and reach full size in about three weeks. When they reach full size they pupate in the soil. There may be two or three broods in a year.

Honey locust trees are a frequent host for the parasitic plant American mistletoe (Phoradendron leucarpum), but usually is not infected by large numbers of them and without suffering obvious damage.

=== Invasiveness ===
Honey locust is one of the most successful of the trees and shrubs in the pea family at invading new habitats worldwide. The species is a major invasive environmental and economic weed in agricultural regions of Australia. The plant forms thickets and destroys the pasture required for livestock to survive. The thickets choke waterways and prevent both domestic and native animals from drinking and also harbour vermin. The spines cause damage to both people and domestic and native wildlife and puncture vehicle tyres. In Argentina the trees were introduced in the early 1800s to be used as a landscape ornamental, as a forest tree, and in windbreaks. It escaped from cultivation and has invaded native grasslands, subtropical montane forest (yungas), and woodlands of the Gran Chaco. In much of the Midwest of the United States the honey locust is also considered a weed tree and a pest that establishes itself in farm fields. In other regions of the world, ranchers and farmers who employ monocropping deem honey locust a nuisance weed; its fast growth allows it to out-compete grasses and other crops.

== Notable trees ==
The oldest known tree is one growing in the Kozia Brana Cemetery in Bratislava, Slovakia. It was planted sometime between 1773 and 1793, making it approximately 243 years old. When last measured in 2021 it had a diameter of 1.2 meters (3.9 ft) and a height of 23.40 meters (76.8 ft).

The largest recorded in the American National Register of Champion Trees is one growing in Botetourt County, Virginia. It was last reported as healthy in 2019. It has a diameter at breast height of about 2.0 meters (6.5 ft), a height of 31 m (103 ft), and a crown spread of 34 m (112 ft).

== Cultivation ==
Due to the honey locust's tolerance of urban problems such as salt spray, compacted soils, poor aeration, constrained planting areas, and pollution, it has been widely planted in cities. In addition it will adapt to relatively dry conditions and either alkaline or acidic soils. Once established it is also drought tolerant, though it grows best with good moisture. It was very widely planted as a replacement for American elm trees killed by Dutch elm disease, becoming somewhat overplanted in the 1970s.

However, due to its wide planting many problems have been discovered. Like maples and oaks, honey locust is particularly vulnerable to Ganoderma root rots, a fungal infection of the roots and lower trunk of the tree. Three insects are the main pests that attack the honey locusts in urban areas, honeylocust plant bug (Blepharidopterus chlorionis), mimosa webworm (Homadaula anisocentra), and honeylocust spider mite (Platytetranychus multidigituli). Thornless cultivars are especially susceptible to damage by the Asian mimosa webworm. Though healthy trees are able to withstand one or two years of complete defoliation, stressed trees may be killed. The number of honey locust trees within 10 meters (33 ft) increases attacks by the webworms as does the amount of impermeable hardscape surfaces out to 20 m (66 ft) from a tree.

=== Cultivars ===
Almost all varieties cultivated after 1950 do not have thorns.

==== Beatrice ====
A cultivar that has been nearly or wholly unavailable in the plant trade since the 1980s. It was sourced from a then 50-year-old tree in Beatrice, Nebraska by the Inter-State Nursery of Hamburg, Iowa in 1955. This cultivar is shaped similarly to an American elm with a wide, spreading top and is also thornless and nearly pod free.

==== Continental ====
The 'Continental' cultivar has especially large leaves of a darker blue-green shade during the summer. It is a large and vigorous selection with a narrow crown that is thornless and nearly seedless. It was introduced to plant commerce by Princeton Nursery of New Jersey in 1973 and patented in 1958.

==== Elegantissima ====
Also known as 'Compacta', Gleditsia sinensis 'Inermis', Gleditsia aquatica 'Elegantissima', 'Globe Honey Locust' and 'Bushy Honey Locust', this cultivar had become very rare by 1996. It is a bushy tree with smaller leaflets with slow growth, only reaching about 4 meters (13 ft) when 25 years old. It has a narrow vase shaped crown and is thornless. It is propagated on its own roots, from ground budding, and also top grafted. It was raised by the nurseryman Charles Breton of Orléans in France around 1880. It has, in some cases, reached large sizes of 12 m (39 ft) or 9.75 m (32 ft).

==== Emerald Kascade ====
This cultivar has a weeping form, with branches that cascade downward. Because it does not produce a leader it must be grafted onto a standard, an upright section of trunk, or be staked. It is reported to be both thornless and fruitless. The leaves are dark green in the summer and bright yellow in the autumn. It was introduced to the horticultural trade by the Duncan & Davies nursery in New Zealand in 1992. It is hardy to USDA zone 3. It is alternatively spelled 'Emerald Cascade' by some sources.

==== Imperial ====
It is a popular cultivar that grows to only about 11 meters (35 ft) in height. It is of very regular growth habit with branches that emerge at right angles to the trunk and a symmetrical arrangement around it. It is noted for its rounded crown. Due to the lower emergence of main branches it requires significant amounts of pruning to be used as a street tree where clearance above vehicles is required. It is used where a somewhat smaller shade tree is required.

==== Shademaster ====
This is a very popular cultivar of the honey locust. Trees have a straight trunk and branches that grow outward and then curve upward to create a symmetrical crown. Very often, without trimming, they will have three or four leaders. At 15 years of age the top of the tree is relatively flat, creating a vase like shape. Compared with 'Skyline' it has a finer branch structure and wider angles where branches attach to the trunk. Sources disagree on the maximum height obtained by this cultivar, Purdue lists it as 14 m (45 ft) while the University of Florida lists it as 15 to 21 m (50 to 70 ft). Trees will produces a few pods when mature and are thornless with dark green foliage in summer.

==== Skyline ====
This is a very common cultivar that has a more pyramidal or slightly squared shape to its canopy. Full grown trees may reach a height of 15 meters (50 ft) or more. Of five standard cultivars including 'Imperial, 'Moraine', 'Shademaster', and 'Sunburst' it showed the greatest height after 15 years of growth. Trees tend to have one or two larger leaders and evenly spaced branches with somewhat narrower crotch angles. Trees can be trimmed to develop one strong central leader with little pruning, because of this lower branches can be removed without distoring the even shape of the crown. This habits make it appropriate as a street tree where lower branches must be removed. The leaflets have a redish to bronze tone when emerging and a dark green and leathery appearance for most of the season. It was introduced by the Cole Nursery in Painesville, Ohio in 1957.

== Uses ==
=== Food ===
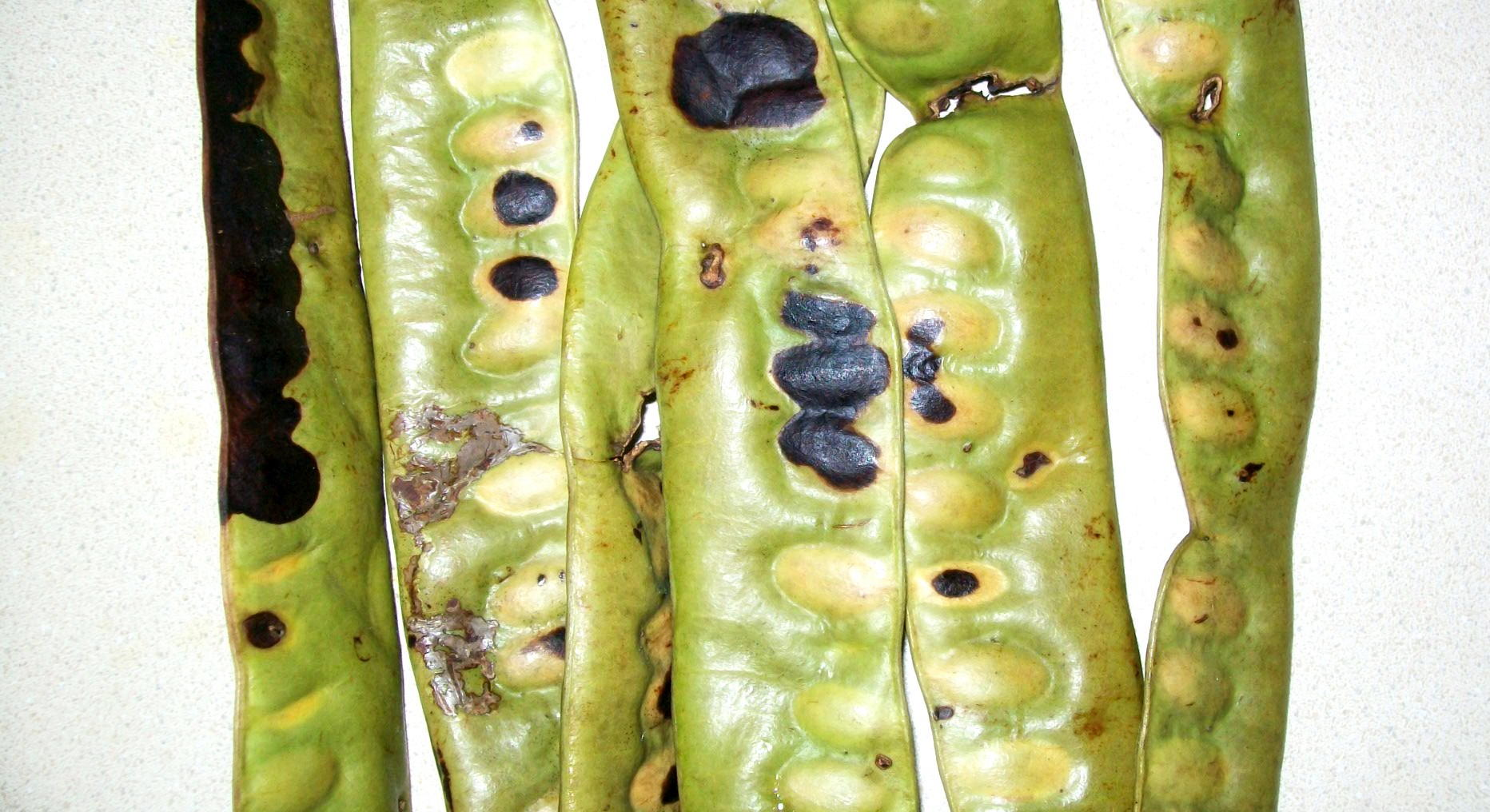
Unripe honey locust pods

The pulp on the inside of the pods is edible (unlike the black locust, which is toxic) and consumed by wildlife and livestock.

Despite its name, the honey locust is not a significant honey plant. The name derives from the sweet taste of the legume pulp, which was used for food and traditional medicine by Native American people, and can also be used to make tea. The long pods, which eventually dry and ripen to brown or maroon, are surrounded by a tough, leathery skin that adheres strongly to the pulp within. The pulp—bright green in unripe pods—is strongly sweet, crisp and succulent in ripe pods. Dark brown tannin-rich beans are found in slots within the pulp. Likewise, its edible seed has nutritional potential, and the flour made from its cotyledons constitutes a food source with various potential uses for pastry and bakery, among other gastronomic uses.

=== Timber ===
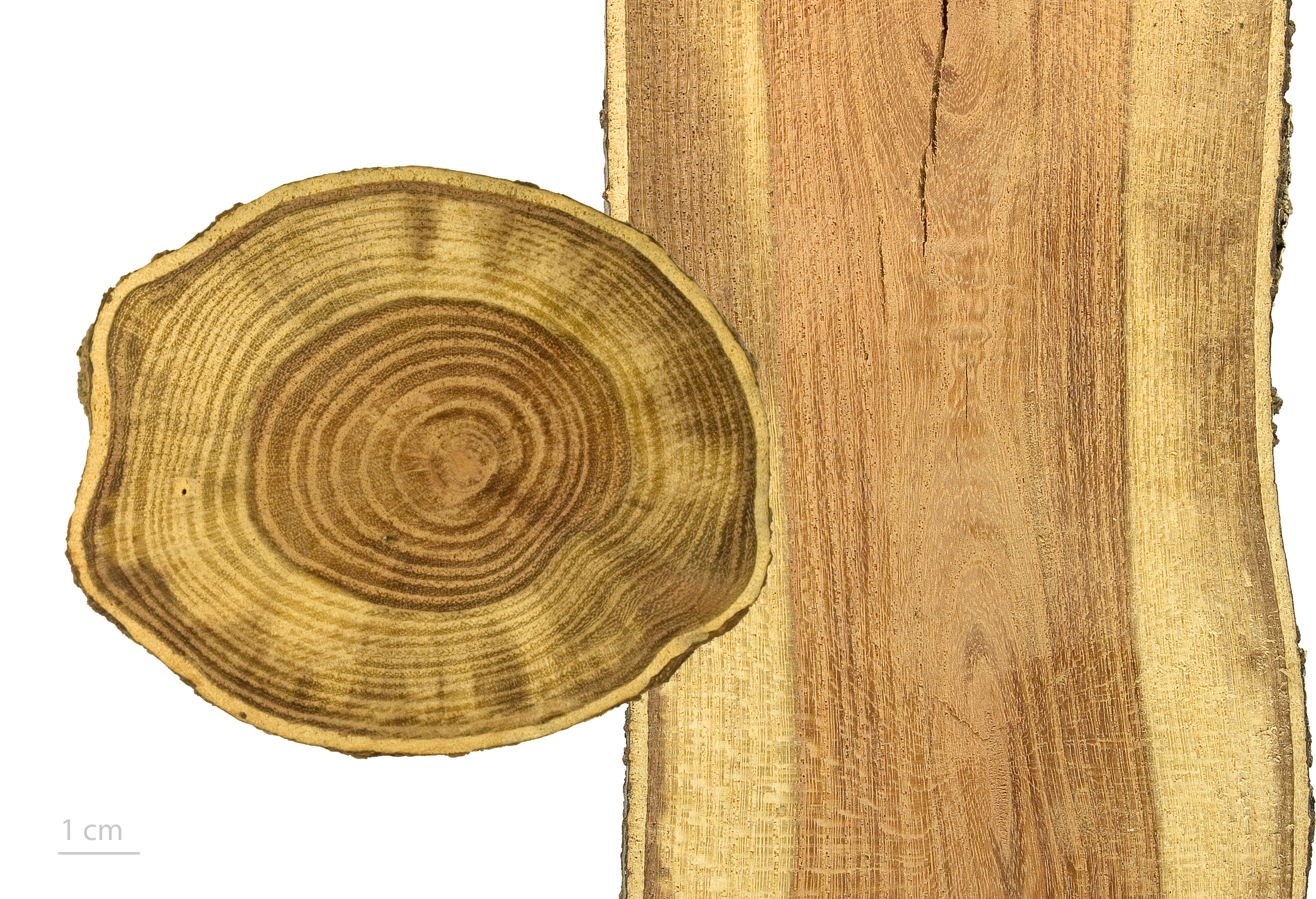
Gleditsia triacanthos

Honey locusts produce a high quality, durable wood that polishes well, but the tree does not grow in sufficient numbers to support a bulk industry. However, a niche market exists for honey locust furniture. It is also used for posts and rails because of the dense, rot-resistant nature of the wood. The heartwood of honey locust is reddish brown while the sapwood is pale yellow. It is strong, but has a coarse grain texture.

== Nitrogen fixation ==
The ability of Gleditsia to fix nitrogen is disputed. Many scientific sources state that Gleditsia does not fix nitrogen. Some support this statement with the fact that Gleditsia does not form root nodules with symbiotic bacteria, the assumption being that without nodulation, no nitrogen fixation can occur. In contrast, many popular sources, permaculture publications in particular, claim that Gleditsia does fix nitrogen but by some other mechanism.

There are anatomical, ecological, and taxonomic indications of nitrogen fixation in non-nodulating legumes. Both nodulating and non-nodulating species have been observed to grow well in nitrogen-poor soil with non-nodulating legumes even dominating some sites. The litter and seeds of non-nodulating species contain levels of nitrogen higher than non-legumes and sometimes even higher than nodulating legumes growing on the same site. How this happens is not yet well understood but there have been some observations of nitrogenase activity in non-nodulating leguminous plants, including honey locust. Electron microscopy indicates the presence of clusters around the inner cortex of roots, just outside the xylem, that resemble colonies of rhizobial bacterioids. These may well constitute the evolutionary precursors in legumes for nitrogen fixation through nodulation. It is not known whether the non-nodulating nitrogen fixation, if it exists, benefits neighboring plants as is said to be the case with nodulating legumes.

== Research ==
In research using databases, more than 60 phytochemicals were identified from honey locust, including polyphenols, triterpenes, sterols, and saponins, with in vitro studies assessing for possible biological activity.
