= Agrilus fallax =

Scientific classification
- Domain: Eukaryota
- Kingdom: Animalia
- Phylum: Arthropoda
- Class: Insecta
- Order: Coleoptera
- Suborder: Polyphaga
- Infraorder: Elateriformia
- Family: Buprestidae
- Genus: Agrilus
- Species: A. fallax

Binomial name
- Agrilus fallax Say, 1833

Synonyms
- Agrilus impressipennis Uhler, 1855; Agrilus zemes Gory, 1841

Species of beetle

Agrilus fallax is a species of metallic wood-boring beetle in the family Buprestidae. It is found in North America.
