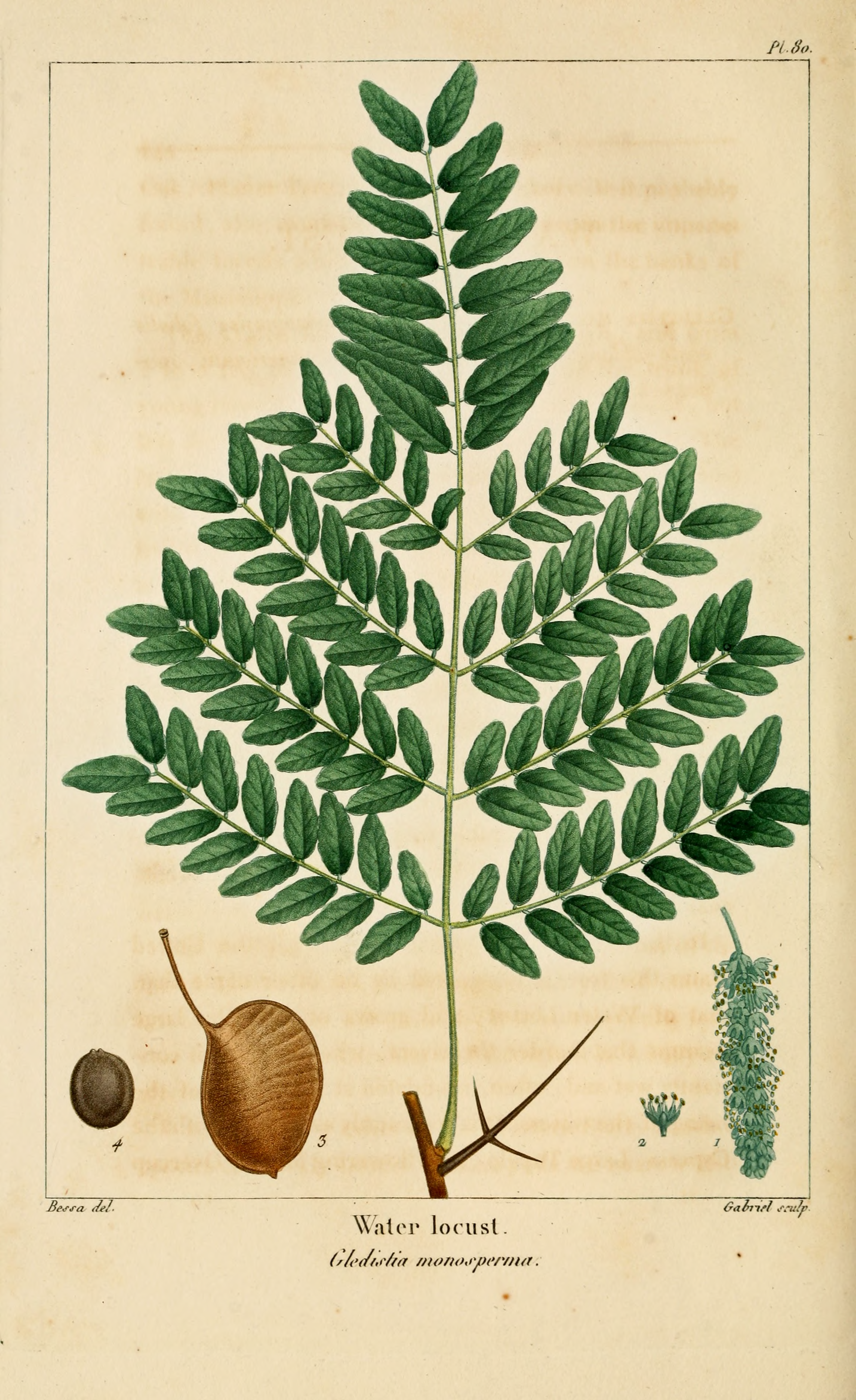

Conservation status
- Least Concern (IUCN 3.1)

Scientific classification
- Kingdom: Plantae
- Clade: Tracheophytes
- Clade: Angiosperms
- Clade: Eudicots
- Clade: Rosids
- Order: Fabales
- Family: Fabaceae
- Subfamily: Caesalpinioideae
- Genus: Gleditsia
- Species: G. aquatica

Binomial name
- Gleditsia aquatica Marshall
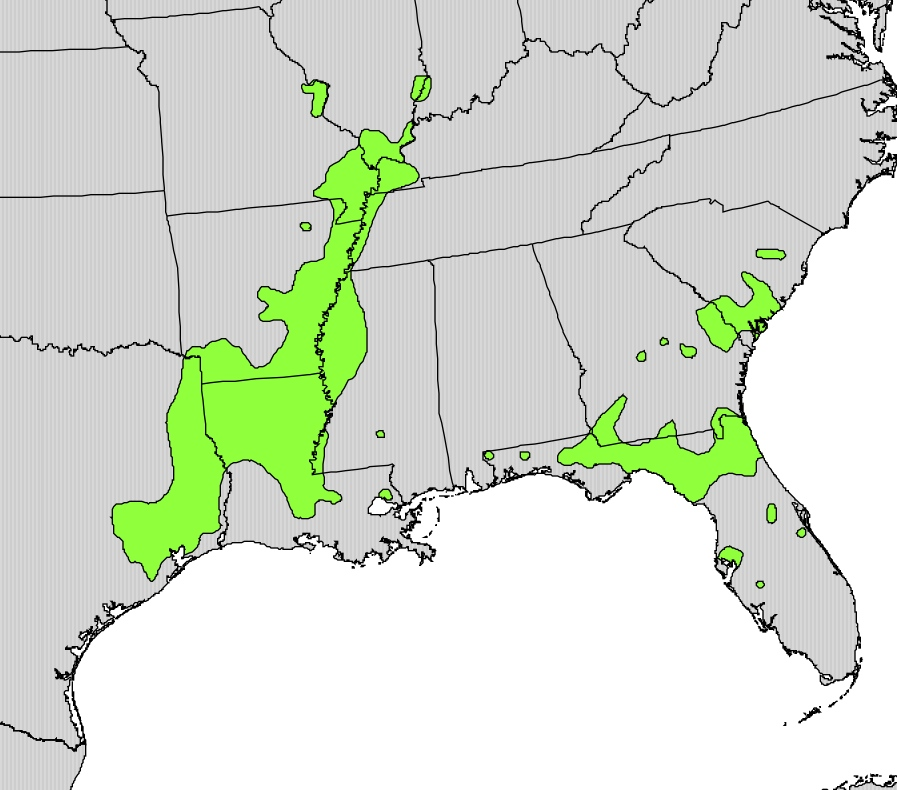

= Gleditsia aquatica =

Species of legume

Gleditsia aquatica, commonly called water locust or swamp locust after its habitat of river swamps and slough margins, is a tree native to the Southeastern United States and adjacent regions.

== Description ==
Gleditsia aquatica often grows 50 to 60 feet. It is commonly found in swamps and prefers partial sun.

Like the other plants in its family (Fabaceae) it produces a flat legume (pod). However, these pods usually only hold one seed.

The leaves are usually simple-compounded, but sometimes appears Acacia .^{[?]}

== Range and habitat ==
This water locust is found mainly in the southern regions of the United States. It is native to the Southeast, from Florida west to eastern Texas, north to Illinois. It can be found as far north as Ohio, southern New York and southwestern Connecticut. It is hardy to zones 6–9.

Natural hybrids have been found to occur where G. aquatica overlaps with the range of Gleditsia triacanthos.
