= List of Orthotylus species =

This is a list of 381 species in Orthotylus, a genus of plant bugs in the family Miridae.

== Orthotylus species ==
- Orthotylus acacicola Lindberg, 1958^{c g}
- Orthotylus aceris Lindberg, 1940^{c g}
- Orthotylus achilleae Putshkov and Putshkov, 1979^{c g}
- Orthotylus adenocarpi (Perris, 1857)^{c g}
- Orthotylus aesculicola Blinn, 1987^{c g}
- Orthotylus affinis Van Duzee, 1916^{i c g}
- Orthotylus aineias Linnavuori, 1994^{c g}
- Orthotylus akastos Linnavuori, 1994^{c g}
- Orthotylus akheloos Linnavuori, 1994^{c g}
- Orthotylus alaiensis Reuter, 1883^{c g}
- Orthotylus albocostatus Van Duzee, 1918^{c g b}
- Orthotylus albovittatus Reuter, 1901^{c g}
- Orthotylus alni Knight, 1923^{i c g}
- Orthotylus althaia Linnavuori, 1994^{c g}
- Orthotylus angeloi Carvalho, 1986^{c g}
- Orthotylus angulatus (Uhler, 1895)^{i c g}
- Orthotylus anjuanensis Carvalho, 1985^{c g}
- Orthotylus antidesmae Polhemus, 2005^{c g}
- Orthotylus antidesmoides Polhemus, 2011^{c g}
- Orthotylus apodiensis Carvalho and Costa, 1990^{c g}
- Orthotylus arabicus Wagner, 1962^{c g}
- Orthotylus aragarssanus Carvalho and Costa, 1990^{c g}
- Orthotylus argentinus (Carvalho, 1985)^{c g}
- Orthotylus armoricanus Ehanno and Matocq, 1990^{c g}
- Orthotylus arthrophyti Wagner, 1969^{c g}
- Orthotylus asper Linnavuori, 1975^{c g}
- Orthotylus atriplicis (Knight, 1968)^{c g}
- Orthotylus attali Morkel and Wyniger, 2009^{c g}
- Orthotylus aureopubescens (Carvalho and Schaffner, 1973)^{c g}
- Orthotylus azalais Kirkaldy, 1902^{i c g}
- Orthotylus bahianus Carvalho, 1976^{c g}
- Orthotylus basicornis Knight, 1923^{i c g}
- Orthotylus beieri Wagner, 1942^{c g}
- Orthotylus bilineatus (Fallén, 1807)^{c g}
- Orthotylus blascoi Ribes, 1991^{c g}
- Orthotylus bobo Linnavuori, 1994^{c g}
- Orthotylus bonaerensis (Carvalho and Carpintero, 1986)^{c g}
- Orthotylus boreellus (Zetterstedt, 1828)^{c g}
- Orthotylus boydi (Schwartz and Wall, 2001)^{c g}
- Orthotylus brasiliensis (Carvalho and Schaffner, 1973)^{c g}
- Orthotylus brevirostris (Knight, 1968)^{c g}
- Orthotylus brindleyi (Knight, 1968)^{c g}
- Orthotylus brunneus Van Duzee, 1916^{i c g}
- Orthotylus bureschi Josifov, 1969^{c g}
- Orthotylus calderensis (Carvalho and Carpintero, 1991)^{c g}
- Orthotylus calichi Tamanini, 1980^{c g}
- Orthotylus callitris Lindberg, 1940^{c g}
- Orthotylus candidatus Van Duzee, 1916^{i c g b}
- Orthotylus caprai Wagner, 1955^{c g}
- Orthotylus carinatus Wagner, 1968^{c g}
- Orthotylus carioca Carvalho, 1990^{c g}
- Orthotylus castaneus Carvalho and Costa, 1990^{c g}
- Orthotylus catarinensis Carvalho, 1985^{c g}
- Orthotylus catulus Van Duzee, 1916^{c g}
- Orthotylus caviceps Wagner, 1971^{c g}
- Orthotylus celtidis Henry, 1979^{i c g}
- Orthotylus ceratoides Muminov, 1990^{c g}
- Orthotylus chapadensis Carvalho, 1985^{c g}
- Orthotylus chilensis Carvalho and Fontes, 1973^{c g}
- Orthotylus choii Josifov, 1976^{c g}
- Orthotylus chullan Forero, 2009^{c g}
- Orthotylus clarensis Carvalho and Costa, 1990^{c g}
- Orthotylus clermontiae Polhemus, 2002^{c g}
- Orthotylus clermonticola Polhemus, 2005^{c g}
- Orthotylus clermontiella Polhemus, 2005^{c g}
- Orthotylus clermontioides Polhemus, 2005^{c g}
- Orthotylus clermontiopsis Polhemus, 2011^{c g}
- Orthotylus coagulatus (Uhler, 1877)^{c g b}
- Orthotylus compactus Linnavuori, 1975^{c g}
- Orthotylus concolor (Kirschbaum, 1856)^{c g}
- Orthotylus contrarius Wagner, 1953^{c g}
- Orthotylus contrastus Van Duzee, 1925^{i c g}
- Orthotylus coprosmae Polhemus, 2002^{c g}
- Orthotylus coprosmaphagus Polhemus, 2011^{c g}
- Orthotylus coprosmaphila Polhemus, 2005^{c g}
- Orthotylus coprosmicola Polhemus, 2005^{c g}
- Orthotylus coprosmivorus Polhemus, 2011^{c g}
- Orthotylus coprosmoides Polhemus, 2002^{c g}
- Orthotylus coprosmopsis Polhemus, 2005^{c g}
- Orthotylus cornichus Wagner, 1969^{c g}
- Orthotylus cornupunctus Ghauri, 1972^{c g}
- Orthotylus costai Kerzhner and Schuh, 1995^{c g}
- Orthotylus creticus Wagner, 1977^{c g}
- Orthotylus cruciatus Van Duzee, 1916^{i c g}
- Orthotylus cuneatus Van Duzee, 1916^{i c g}
- Orthotylus cupressi Reuter, 1883^{c g}
- Orthotylus curvipennis Reuter, 1875^{c g}
- Orthotylus custeri (Knight, 1968)^{c g}
- Orthotylus cyanescens Carvalho and Ferreira, 1986^{c g}
- Orthotylus daphne Kirkaldy, 1902^{i c g}
- Orthotylus diamantinus Carvalho, 1984^{c g}
- Orthotylus digitus Carapezza, 1997^{c g}
- Orthotylus dimorphus Wagner, 1958^{c g}
- Orthotylus diospyri Polhemus, 2002^{c g}
- Orthotylus diospyricola Polhemus, 2005^{c g}
- Orthotylus diospyroides Polhemus, 2005^{c g}
- Orthotylus diospyropsis Polhemus, 2005^{c g}
- Orthotylus diospyvivorus Polhemus, 2011^{c g}
- Orthotylus divisus Linnavuori, 1961^{c g}
- Orthotylus dodgei Van Duzee, 1921^{i c g}
- Orthotylus dorsalis (Provancher, 1872)^{i c g b}
- Orthotylus dubautiae Polhemus, 2011^{c g}
- Orthotylus dubauticola Polhemus, 2011^{c g}
- Orthotylus dumosus Seidenstucker, 1971^{c g}
- Orthotylus elaeocarpi Polhemus, 2011^{c g}
- Orthotylus eleagni Jakovlev, 1881^{c g}
- Orthotylus elongatus Wagner, 1965^{c g}
- Orthotylus empetri Wagner, 1977^{c g}
- Orthotylus ericetorum (Fallén, 1807)^{c g}
- Orthotylus ericinellae Poppius, 1910^{c g}
- Orthotylus erinaceae Wagner, 1977^{c g}
- Orthotylus esavianus Carvalho and Ferreira, 1986^{c g}
- Orthotylus euchloris Reuter, 1908^{c g}
- Orthotylus eurotiae (Knight, 1968)^{c g}
- Orthotylus farcha Linnavuori, 1994^{c g}
- Orthotylus fieberi Frey-Gessner, 1864^{c g}
- Orthotylus flaviceps Wagner, 1974^{c g}
- Orthotylus flavinervis (Kirschbaum, 1856)^{c g}
- Orthotylus flavosparsus (Sahlberg, 1842)^{i c g b}
- Orthotylus flemingi Schwartz and Scudder, 2003^{i c g}
- Orthotylus formosus Van Duzee, 1916^{i c g}
- Orthotylus fraternus Van Duzee, 1916^{i c g}
- Orthotylus fuscescens (Kirschbaum, 1856)^{c g}
- Orthotylus fuscicornis Knight, 1927^{i c g}
- Orthotylus fuscipennis Yasunaga, 1999^{c g}
- Orthotylus gemmae Gesse and Goula, 2003^{c g}
- Orthotylus genisticola Carapezza, 1997^{c g}
- Orthotylus globiceps Wagner, 1976^{c g}
- Orthotylus gotohi Yasunaga, 1993^{c g}
- Orthotylus gracilis Reuter, 1900^{c g}
- Orthotylus guaranianus Carvalho and Fontes, 1973^{c g}
- Orthotylus halaibicus Linnavuori, 1975^{c g}
- Orthotylus halophilus Lindberg, 1953^{c g}
- Orthotylus hamatus Van Duzee, 1918^{i c g}
- Orthotylus harryi Kerzhner and Schuh, 1995^{c g}
- Orthotylus hazeltoni Kerzhner and Schuh, 1995^{c g}
- Orthotylus hedyoti Polhemus, 2002^{c g}
- Orthotylus hedyoticola Polhemus, 2002^{c g}
- Orthotylus hedyotiella Polhemus, 2005^{c g}
- Orthotylus hedyotioides Polhemus, 2005^{c g}
- Orthotylus hedyotiopsis Polhemus, 2002^{c g}
- Orthotylus hedyotiphila Polhemus, 2005^{c g}
- Orthotylus hedyotivorus Polhemus, 2005^{c g}
- Orthotylus hibisci Polhemus, 2002^{c g}
- Orthotylus hirtulus Wagner, 1951^{c g}
- Orthotylus hodiernus Linnavuori, 1961^{c g}
- Orthotylus ife Linnavuori, 1994^{c g}
- Orthotylus ilicis Polhemus, 2002^{c g}
- Orthotylus indigoferae Linnavuori, 1975^{c g}
- Orthotylus interpositus K. Schmidt, 1938^{c g}
- Orthotylus intricatus Wagner, 1975^{c g}
- Orthotylus iolani Kirkaldy, 1902^{i c g}
- Orthotylus japonicus Yasunaga, 1999^{c g}
- Orthotylus joacemensis (Carvalho and Costa, 1992)^{c g}
- Orthotylus jordii Pagola-Carte and Zabalegui, 2006^{c g}
- Orthotylus josei Kerzhner and Schuh, 1995^{c g}
- Orthotylus josifovi Wagner, 1959^{c g}
- Orthotylus juglandis Henry, 1979^{i c g}
- Orthotylus junipericola Linnavuori, 1965^{c g}
- Orthotylus kakan Forero, 2009^{c g}
- Orthotylus kanakanus Kirkaldy, 1902^{i c g}
- Orthotylus kara Polhemus, 2005^{c g}
- Orthotylus kassandra Kirkaldy, 1902^{i c g}
- Orthotylus kassandroides Polhemus, 2005^{c g}
- Orthotylus kassandropsis Polhemus, 2005^{c g}
- Orthotylus katmai (Knight, 1921)^{i c g}
- Orthotylus kekele Kirkaldy, 1902^{i c g}
- Orthotylus kenamuke Linnavuori, 1975^{c g}
- Orthotylus kikin Forero, 2009^{c g}
- Orthotylus knighti Van Duzee, 1916^{i c g}
- Orthotylus kogurjonicus Josifov, 1992^{c g}
- Orthotylus kopiko Polhemus, 2005^{c g}
- Orthotylus kopikocola Polhemus, 2011^{c g}
- Orthotylus kopikoides Polhemus, 2011^{c g}
- Orthotylus kopikopsis Polhemus, 2011^{c g}
- Orthotylus kopikovorus Polhemus, 2011^{c g}
- Orthotylus korbanus Wagner, 1977^{c g}
- Orthotylus kurilensis Kerzhner, 1997^{c g}
- Orthotylus kymgangsanicus Josifov, 1987^{c g}
- Orthotylus languidus Van Duzee, 1916^{i c g}
- Orthotylus lateralis Van Duzee, 1916^{i c g}
- Orthotylus leokhares Linnavuori, 1990^{c g}
- Orthotylus leonardi Kerzhner and Schuh, 1995^{c g}
- Orthotylus lesbicus Wagner, 1975^{c g}
- Orthotylus lethierryi Reuter, 1875^{c g}
- Orthotylus leviculus (Knight, 1927)^{c g}
- Orthotylus mafraq Linnavuori and Al-Safadi, 1993^{c g}
- Orthotylus major (Wagner, 1969)^{c g}
- Orthotylus manauensis Carvalho, 1983^{c g}
- Orthotylus manoniella Polhemus, 2011^{c g}
- Orthotylus manono Polhemus, 2011^{c g}
- Orthotylus manonocola Polhemus, 2011^{c g}
- Orthotylus manonoides Polhemus, 2011^{c g}
- Orthotylus manonophagus Polhemus, 2011^{c g}
- Orthotylus manonophila Polhemus, 2011^{c g}
- Orthotylus manonovorus Polhemus, 2011^{c g}
- Orthotylus marginalis Reuter, 1883^{c g}
- Orthotylus marginatus (Uhler, 1895)^{i c}
- Orthotylus mariagratiae Carapezza, 1984^{c g}
- Orthotylus martini Puton, 1887^{c g}
- Orthotylus massawanus Linnavuori, 1975^{c g}
- Orthotylus masutti Linnavuori, 1977^{c g}
- Orthotylus matocqi Carapezza, 1997^{c g}
- Orthotylus matogrossensis Carvalho, 1985^{c g}
- Orthotylus maurus Wagner, 1969^{c g}
- Orthotylus mayrii V. Signoret, 1880^{c g}
- Orthotylus melanotylus Kerzhner, 1962^{c g}
- Orthotylus melicopi Polhemus, 2005^{c g}
- Orthotylus melicopoides Polhemus, 2011^{c g}
- Orthotylus membraneus Lindberg, 1940^{c g}
- Orthotylus membranosus (Carvalho and Costa, 1992)^{c g}
- Orthotylus mentor Linnavuori, 1994^{c g}
- Orthotylus metrosideri Polhemus, 2005^{c g}
- Orthotylus metrosideropsis Polhemus, 2011^{c g}
- Orthotylus mimus (Knight, 1927)^{c g}
- Orthotylus minensis (Carvalho, 1985)^{c g}
- Orthotylus minuendus Knight, 1925^{i c g}
- Orthotylus minutus Jakovlev, 1877^{c g}
- Orthotylus missionensis Carvalho, 1985^{c g}
- Orthotylus mistus Knight, 1925^{c g}
- Orthotylus modestus Van Duzee, 1916^{i c g b}
- Orthotylus molliculus Van Duzee, 1916^{i c g}
- Orthotylus mollis Linnavuori, 1975^{c g}
- Orthotylus moncreaffi (Douglas and Scott, 1874)^{c g}
- Orthotylus monticalus Linnavuori, 1975^{c g}
- Orthotylus mourei Carvalho, 1985^{c g}
- Orthotylus mundricus Linnavuori, 1994^{c g}
- Orthotylus nassatus (Fabricius, 1787)^{i c g}
- Orthotylus necopinus Van Duzee, 1916^{i c g b}
- Orthotylus neglectus Knight, 1923^{i c g}
- Orthotylus neocoprosmae Polhemus, 2002^{c g}
- Orthotylus neoilicis Polhemus, 2002^{c g}
- Orthotylus neopsychotriae Polhemus, 2005^{c g}
- Orthotylus neopsychotricus Polhemus, 2011^{c g}
- Orthotylus neopsychotrioides Polhemus, 2005^{c g}
- Orthotylus neopsychotriopsis Polhemus, 2011^{c g}
- Orthotylus nestegiae Polhemus, 2005^{c g}
- Orthotylus nigricollis Wagner, 1962^{c g}
- Orthotylus nigroluteus Carvalho and Ferreira, 1986^{c g}
- Orthotylus nocturnus Linnavuori, 1974^{c g}
- Orthotylus notabilis Knight, 1927^{i c g}
- Orthotylus nubaensis Linnavuori, 1975^{c g}
- Orthotylus nyctalis Knight, 1927^{i c g}
- Orthotylus nymphias Linnavuori, 1974^{c g}
- Orthotylus obscurus Reuter, 1875^{c g}
- Orthotylus ochrotrichus Fieber, 1864^{i c g}
- Orthotylus ohia Polhemus, 2011^{c g}
- Orthotylus olapa Polhemus, 2011^{c g}
- Orthotylus orientalis Poppius, 1915^{c g}
- Orthotylus ornatus Van Duzee, 1916^{i c g b}
- Orthotylus oschanini Reuter, 1883^{c g}
- Orthotylus pacificus Van Duzee, 1919^{i c g}
- Orthotylus pallens (Matsumura, 1911)^{c g}
- Orthotylus pallidulus Reuter, 1904^{c g}
- Orthotylus palustris Reuter, 1888^{c g}
- Orthotylus paraguaiensis Carvalho and Costa, 1991^{c g}
- Orthotylus parvistylus Wagner, 1971^{c g}
- Orthotylus parvulus Reuter, 1879^{c g}
- Orthotylus paulinoi Reuter, 1885^{c g}
- Orthotylus pelagicus (Kirkaldy, 1909)^{c g}
- Orthotylus pennsylvanicus Henry, 1979^{i c g}
- Orthotylus perkinsi Kirkaldy, 1902^{i c g}
- Orthotylus perrottetiae Polhemus, 2005^{c g}
- Orthotylus perrotteticola Polhemus, 2011^{c g}
- Orthotylus perrottetiopsis Polhemus, 2005^{c g}
- Orthotylus pilo Polhemus, 2005^{c g}
- Orthotylus pipturi Polhemus, 2002^{c g}
- Orthotylus pipturicola Polhemus, 2011^{c g}
- Orthotylus pipturiphila Polhemus, 2011^{c g}
- Orthotylus pipturoides Polhemus, 2002^{c g}
- Orthotylus pisoniacola Polhemus, 2011^{c g}
- Orthotylus pisoniae Polhemus, 2002^{c g}
- Orthotylus pisonioides Polhemus, 2002^{c g}
- Orthotylus pisoniopsis Polhemus, 2005^{c g}
- Orthotylus platensis Carvalho and Fontes, 1973^{c g}
- Orthotylus plucheae Van Duzee, 1925^{i c g}
- Orthotylus polemon Linnavuori, 1975^{c g}
- Orthotylus populi Drapolyuk, 1991^{c g}
- Orthotylus prasinus (Fallén, 1826)^{c g}
- Orthotylus priesneri K. Schmidt, 1939^{c g}
- Orthotylus problematicus Linnavuori, 1953^{c g}
- Orthotylus prunicola Linnavuori, 1984^{c g}
- Orthotylus psalloides Wagner, 1959^{c g}
- Orthotylus pseudotantali Polhemus, 2002^{c g}
- Orthotylus psychotriae Polhemus, 2002^{c g}
- Orthotylus psychotricola Polhemus, 2002^{c g}
- Orthotylus psychotrioides Polhemus, 2002^{c g}
- Orthotylus pullatus Van Duzee, 1916^{i c g}
- Orthotylus pusillus Reuter, 1883^{c g}
- Orthotylus putshkovi Josifov, 1974^{c g}
- Orthotylus quercicola Reuter, 1885^{c g}
- Orthotylus ramus Knight, 1927^{i c g}
- Orthotylus repandus Linnavuori, 1975^{c g}
- Orthotylus ribesi Wagner, 1976^{c g}
- Orthotylus ricardoi Carvalho, 1988^{c g}
- Orthotylus riegeri Heckman, 2000^{c g}
- Orthotylus riodocensis Carvalho, 1986^{c g}
- Orthotylus riparius Kulik, 1973^{c g}
- Orthotylus robineaui Schwartz and Scudder, 2003^{c g}
- Orthotylus robiniae Johnston, 1935^{i c g}
- Orthotylus roppai Carvalho, 1985^{c g}
- Orthotylus roseipennis Reuter, 1905^{c g}
- Orthotylus rossi Knight, 1941^{i c g}
- Orthotylus rubidus (Puton, 1874)^{c g}
- Orthotylus rubrocuneatus Linnavuori, 1975^{c g}
- Orthotylus salicis Jakovlev, 1893^{c g}
- Orthotylus salicorniae Lindberg, 1953^{c g}
- Orthotylus salsolae Reuter, 1875^{c g}
- Orthotylus saltensis (Carvalho, 1985)^{c g}
- Orthotylus schoberiae Reuter, 1876^{c g}
- Orthotylus seabrai Carvalho, 1985^{c g}
- Orthotylus selene Linnavuori, 1994^{c g}
- Orthotylus senectus Van Duzee, 1916^{c g}
- Orthotylus serus Van Duzee, 1921^{i c g}
- Orthotylus sicilianus Wagner, 1954^{c g}
- Orthotylus sidnicus (Stal, 1859)^{c g}
- Orthotylus singularis Carvalho and Carpintero, 1992^{c g}
- Orthotylus sinopensis Carvalho and Costa, 1990^{c g}
- Orthotylus siuranus Wagner, 1964^{c g}
- Orthotylus smaragdinus Liu, 2009^{c g}
- Orthotylus sophorae Josifov, 1976^{c g}
- Orthotylus sophoricola Polhemus, 2011^{c g}
- Orthotylus sophoroides Polhemus, 2005^{c g}
- Orthotylus spartiicola Reuter, 1904^{c g}
- Orthotylus spinosus Knight, 1925^{i}
- Orthotylus stanleyaea (Knight, 1968)^{c g}
- Orthotylus stitti (Knight, 1968)^{c g}
- Orthotylus stratensis Wagner, 1963^{c g}
- Orthotylus strigilifer Linnavuori, 1975^{c g}
- Orthotylus stysi Koziskova, 1967^{c g}
- Orthotylus submarginatus (Say, 1832)^{i c g b}
- Orthotylus subtropicalis Kerzhner and Schuh, 1995^{c g}
- Orthotylus sulinus Carvalho and Wallerstein, 1978^{c g}
- Orthotylus sumaloensis (Carvalho and Carpintero, 1992)^{c g}
- Orthotylus symphoricarpi (Knight, 1968)^{c g}
- Orthotylus tabescens (Stal, 1858)^{c g}
- Orthotylus tafoensis Kerzhner and Schuh, 1995^{c g}
- Orthotylus taksini Yasunaga and Yamada, 2009^{c g}
- Orthotylus tamarindi Linnavuori, 1975^{c g}
- Orthotylus tantali (Perkins, 1912)^{i c g}
- Orthotylus tantanus Wagner, 1971^{c g}
- Orthotylus taxodii Knight, 1941^{c g}
- Orthotylus tenellus (Fallén, 1807)^{c g}
- Orthotylus teutonianus Carvalho and Costa, 1992^{c g}
- Orthotylus thaleia Linnavuori, 1999^{c g}
- Orthotylus thymelaeae Eckerlein and Wagner, 1965^{c g}
- Orthotylus tijucanus Carvalho and Costa, 1990^{c g}
- Orthotylus troodensis Wagner, 1961^{c g}
- Orthotylus turanicus Reuter, 1883^{c g}
- Orthotylus turcmenorum V. Putshkov, 1976^{c g}
- Orthotylus ulaula Polhemus, 2005^{c g}
- Orthotylus uniformis Van Duzee, 1916^{i c}
- Orthotylus urerae Polhemus, 2002^{c g}
- Orthotylus ureraphila Polhemus, 2005^{c g}
- Orthotylus urericola Polhemus, 2005^{c g}
- Orthotylus utahensis (Knight, 1968)^{c g}
- Orthotylus ute Knight, 1927^{i c g b}
- Orthotylus vanduzeei Carvalho, 1955^{i}
- Orthotylus vanettii Carvalho and Ferreira, 1986^{c g}
- Orthotylus veraensis Carvalho, 1990^{c g}
- Orthotylus vermelhensis (Carvalho and Costa, 1992)^{c g}
- Orthotylus verticatus Wagner, 1958^{c g}
- Orthotylus vestitus (Uhler, 1890)^{c g}
- Orthotylus vianai Carvalho and Carpintero, 1992^{c g}
- Orthotylus virens (Fallén, 1807)^{c g}
- Orthotylus virescens (Douglas & Scott, 1865)^{c g b}
- Orthotylus viridinervis (Kirschbaum, 1856)^{i c g}
- Orthotylus viridis Van Duzee, 1916^{i c g}
- Orthotylus viridissimus Linnavuori, 1961^{c g}
- Orthotylus viridulus (Knight, 1928)^{c g}
- Orthotylus vittiger Linnavuori, 1975^{c g}
- Orthotylus wallisi (Kelton, 1980)^{c g}
- Orthotylus whiteheadi (T. Henry, 1991)^{c g}
- Orthotylus wileyae (Knight, 1927)^{c g}
- Orthotylus xanthopoda Yasunaga, 1999^{c g}
- Orthotylus xavantinus Carvalho and Costa, 1990^{c g}
- Orthotylus xylosmae Polhemus, 2002^{c g}
- Orthotylus xylosmicola Polhemus, 2005^{c g}
- Orthotylus xylosmoides Polhemus, 2005^{c g}
- Orthotylus zorensis Wagner, 1975^{c g}
- Othotylus taxodii Knight, 1925^{i g}

Data sources: i = ITIS, c = Catalogue of Life, g = GBIF, b = Bugguide.net
