= Orthotylus adenocarpi adenocarpi =

Scientific classification
- Kingdom: Animalia
- Phylum: Arthropoda
- Class: Insecta
- Order: Hemiptera
- Suborder: Heteroptera
- Family: Miridae
- Genus: Orthotylus
- Species: O. adenocarpi
- Subspecies: O. a. adenocarpi

Trinomial name
- Orthotylus adenocarpi adenocarpi (Perris, 1857)

Subspecies of true bug

Orthotylus adenocarpi adenocarpi is a subspecies of bug from the Miridae family that can be found in Benelux, Czech Republic, Denmark, France, Germany, Great Britain, Ireland, Poland, Spain, and Sweden.
