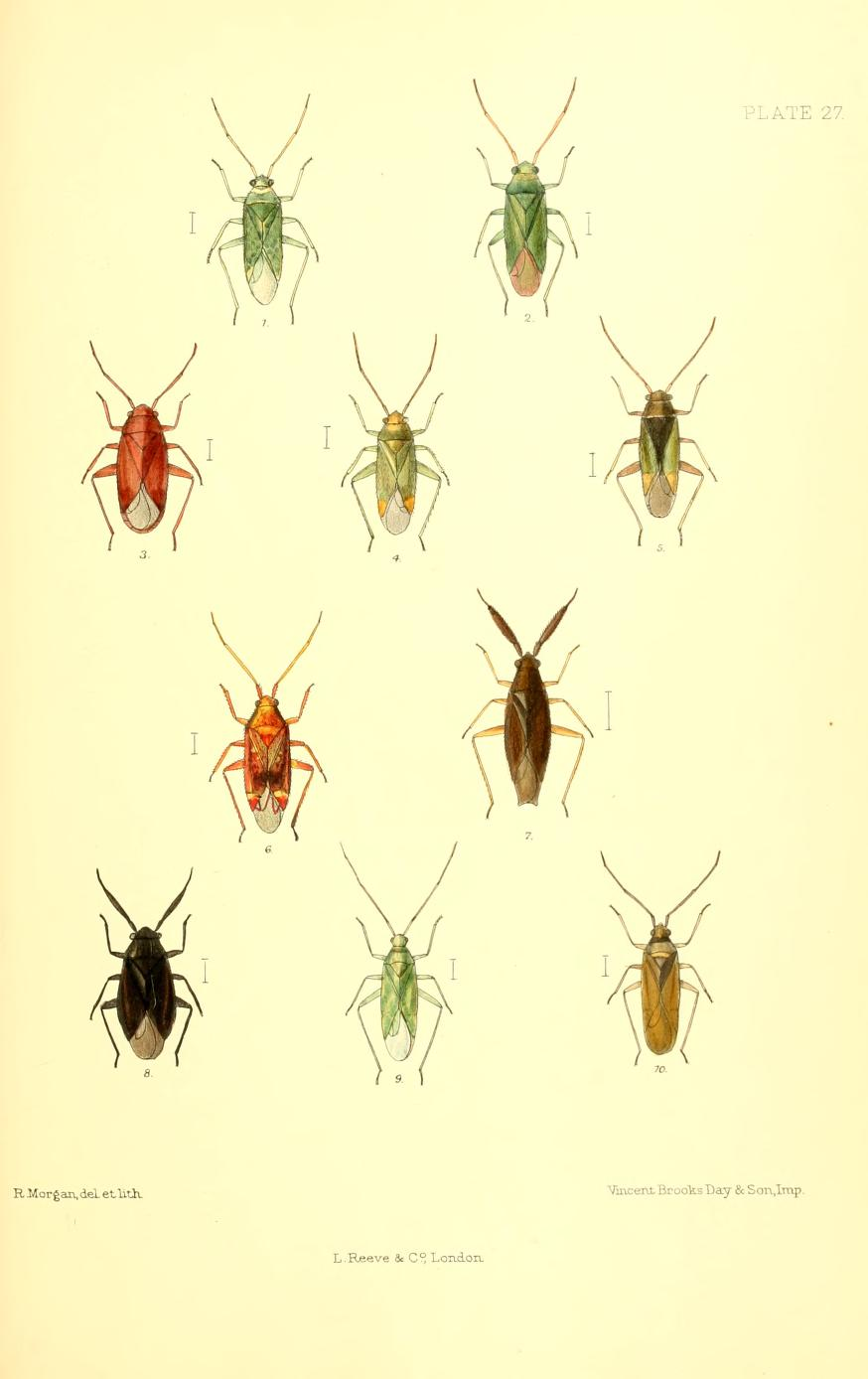
- Orthotylus adenocarpi depicted in Edward Saunders Hemiptera Heteroptera of the British Islands (figure 2)

Scientific classification
- Kingdom: Animalia
- Phylum: Arthropoda
- Class: Insecta
- Order: Hemiptera
- Suborder: Heteroptera
- Family: Miridae
- Genus: Orthotylus
- Species: O. adenocarpi

Binomial name
- Orthotylus adenocarpi (Perris, 1857)

= Orthotylus adenocarpi =

Species of true bug

Orthotylus adenocarpi is a species of bug from the Miridae family that can be found in Andorra, Benelux, Czech Republic, Denmark, France, Germany, Great Britain, Ireland, Poland, Spain, and Sweden. O. adenocarpi lives exclusively on broom Sarothamnus scoparius. In addition, to sucking sap, they also suck aphids and Psyllidae. The nymphs occur from mid-May, adult bugs from mid-June to a maximum of mid-August.

== Subspecies ==
- Orthotylus adenocarpi adenocarpi (Perris, 1857)
- Orthotylus adenocarpi purgantis Wagner, 1957
