= Bithia modesta =

Scientific classification
- Kingdom: Animalia
- Phylum: Arthropoda
- Class: Insecta
- Order: Diptera
- Family: Tachinidae
- Subfamily: Tachininae
- Tribe: Leskiini
- Genus: Bithia
- Species: B. modesta

Binomial name
- Bithia modesta (Meigen, 1824)

Synonyms
- Tachina modesta Meigen, 1824; Masicera grisea Perris, 1852; Tachina invaria Walker, 1849

Species of fly

Bithia modesta is a species of bristle fly in the family Tachinidae.

== Distribution ==
China, British Isles, Czech Republic, Hungary, Poland, Romania, Ukraine, Bulgaria, Corsica, Greece, Italy, Macedonia, Portugal, Serbia, Spain, Turkey, Austria, France, Switzerland, Israel, Palestine, Russia, Transcaucasia.
