= Orthotylus tenellus meridionalis =

Scientific classification
- Kingdom: Animalia
- Phylum: Arthropoda
- Class: Insecta
- Order: Hemiptera
- Suborder: Heteroptera
- Family: Miridae
- Genus: Orthotylus
- Species: O. tenellus
- Subspecies: O. t. meridionalis

Trinomial name
- Orthotylus tenellus meridionalis Josifov, 2006

Subspecies of true bug

Orthotylus tenellus meridionalis is a subspecies of the bug Orthotylus tenellus. It is endemic to Bulgaria.
