= Orthotylus adenocarpi purgantis =

Scientific classification
- Kingdom: Animalia
- Phylum: Arthropoda
- Class: Insecta
- Order: Hemiptera
- Suborder: Heteroptera
- Family: Miridae
- Genus: Orthotylus
- Species: O. adenocarpi
- Subspecies: O. a. purgantis

Trinomial name
- Orthotylus adenocarpi purgantis Wagner, 1957

Subspecies of true bug

Orthotylus adenocarpi purgantis is a subspecies of bug from the Miridae family that can be found in Andorra and Spain.
