= Orthotylus artemisiae =

Scientific classification
- Kingdom: Animalia
- Phylum: Arthropoda
- Class: Insecta
- Order: Hemiptera
- Suborder: Heteroptera
- Family: Miridae
- Genus: Orthotylus
- Species: O. artemisiae

Binomial name
- Orthotylus artemisiae J. Sahlberg, 1878

Species of true bug

Orthotylus artemisiae is a species of bug from the Miridae family that can be found in Central Russia and the Nearctic realm.
