= Orthotylus tenellus tenellus =

Scientific classification
- Kingdom: Animalia
- Phylum: Arthropoda
- Class: Insecta
- Order: Hemiptera
- Suborder: Heteroptera
- Family: Miridae
- Genus: Orthotylus
- Species: O. tenellus
- Subspecies: O. t. tenellus

Trinomial name
- Orthotylus tenellus tenellus Fallén, 1807

Subspecies of true bug

Orthotylus tenellus tenellus is a subspecies of Orthotylus tenellus from the family Miridae that can be found everywhere in Europe except for Albania, Croatia, Liechtenstein, Lithuania, Malta, North Macedonia, Portugal, and Romania.
