= Orthotylus paulinoi =

Scientific classification
- Kingdom: Animalia
- Phylum: Arthropoda
- Class: Insecta
- Order: Hemiptera
- Suborder: Heteroptera
- Family: Miridae
- Genus: Orthotylus
- Species: O. paulinoi

Binomial name
- Orthotylus paulinoi Reuter, 1885

Species of true bug

Orthotylus paulinoi is a species of bug in the Miridae family that is endemic to Portugal.
