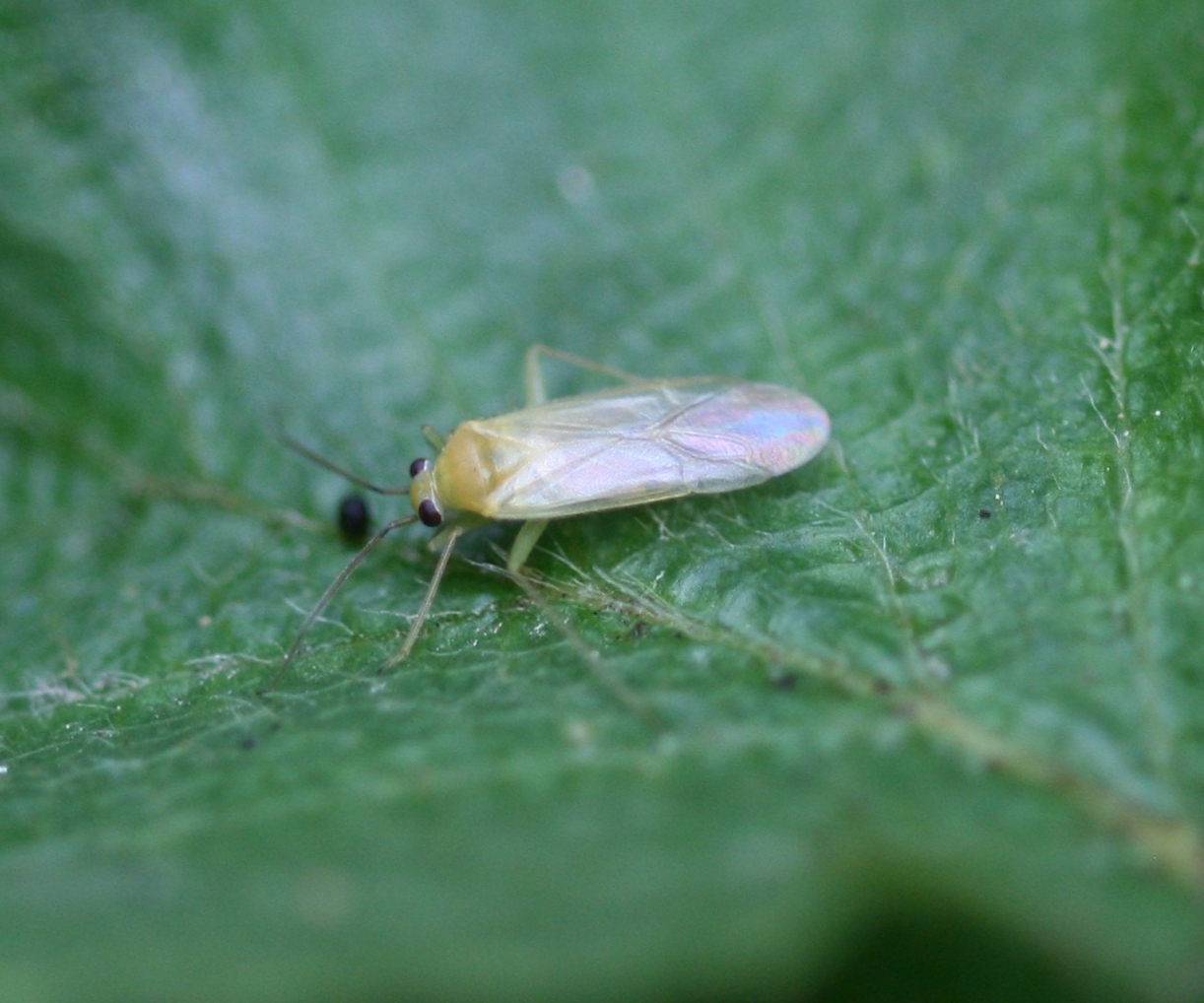
- Orthotylus tenellus, Scotland

Scientific classification
- Kingdom: Animalia
- Phylum: Arthropoda
- Class: Insecta
- Order: Hemiptera
- Suborder: Heteroptera
- Family: Miridae
- Genus: Orthotylus
- Species: O. tenellus

Binomial name
- Orthotylus tenellus (Fallén, 1807)

= Orthotylus tenellus =

Species of true bug

Orthotylus tenellus is a species of bug from a family of Miridae that can be found in Benelux, Eastern Europe (except for Lithuania and Russia), Czech Republic, France, Germany, Greece, Italy, Moldova, Poland, Scandinavia, Slovakia, the United Kingdom, northern states of former Yugoslavia, and some countries in Asia.

== Description ==
Adults are 4–4.5 millimetres (0.16–0.18 in) long, and are active from June–August.

== Ecology ==
The species are feeding on trees like: oak, ash, and hazel.

== Subspecies ==
- Orthotylus tenellus meridionalis Josifov, 2006
- Orthotylus tenellus tenellus (Fallen, 1807)
