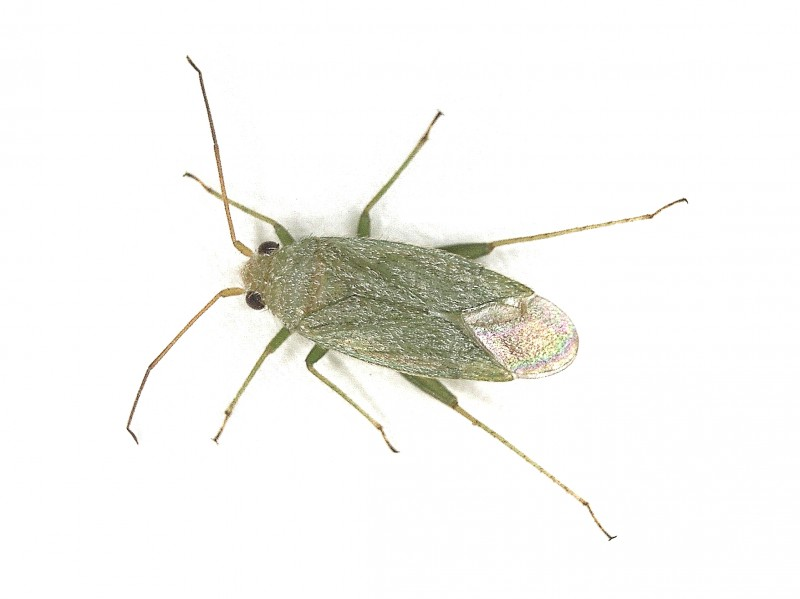
- Orthotylus concolor Molenhoek, the Netherlands

Scientific classification
- Kingdom: Animalia
- Phylum: Arthropoda
- Clade: Pancrustacea
- Class: Insecta
- Order: Hemiptera
- Suborder: Heteroptera
- Family: Miridae
- Genus: Orthotylus
- Species: O. concolor

Binomial name
- Orthotylus concolor (Kirschbaum, 1856)

= Orthotylus concolor =

Species of true bug

Orthotylus concolor is a Palearctic species of true bug.
