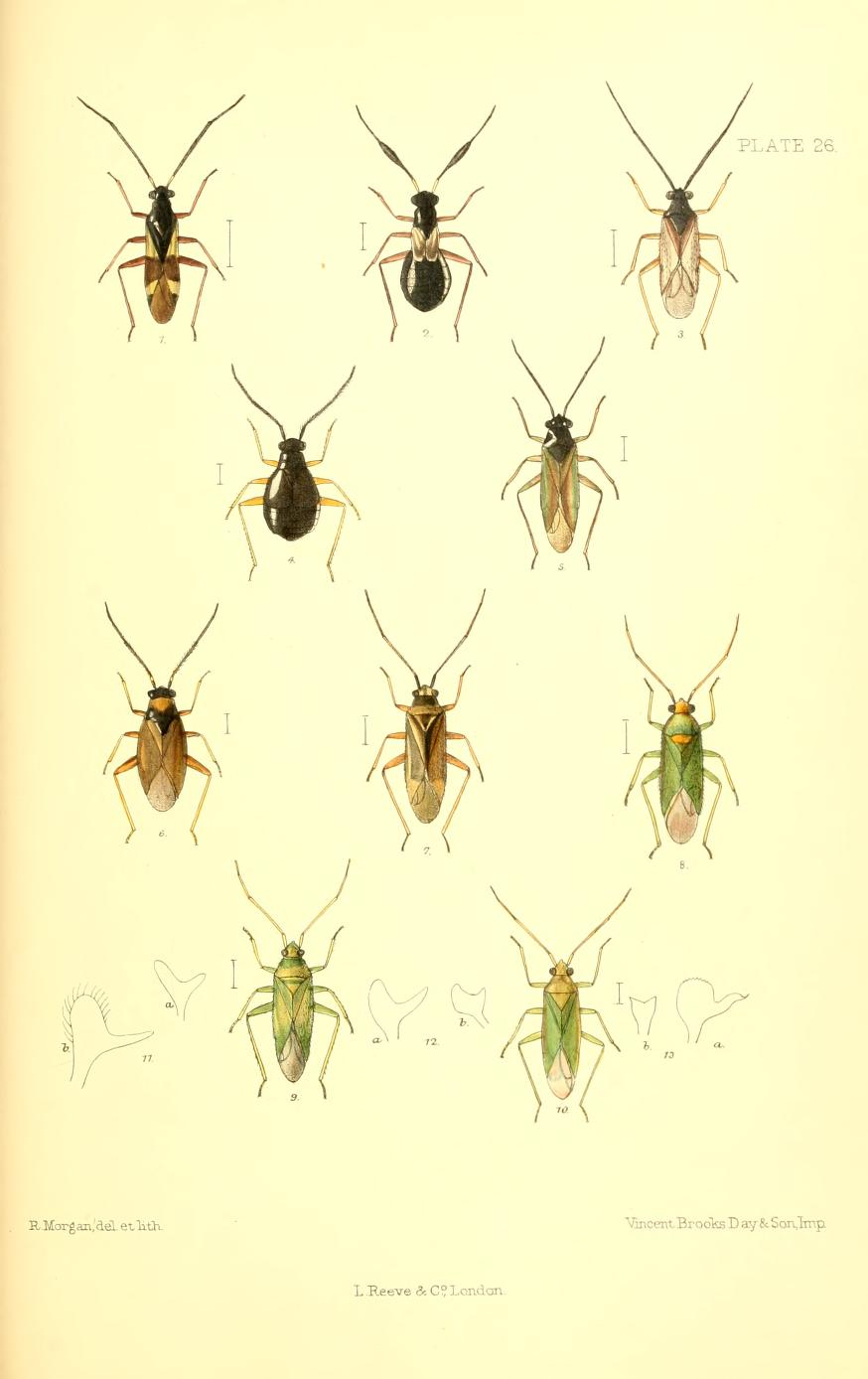
- Orthotylus nassatus depicted in Edward Saunders Hemiptera Heteroptera of the British Islands (figure 9)

Scientific classification
- Kingdom: Animalia
- Phylum: Arthropoda
- Class: Insecta
- Order: Hemiptera
- Suborder: Heteroptera
- Family: Miridae
- Genus: Orthotylus
- Species: O. nassatus

Binomial name
- Orthotylus nassatus (Fabricius, 1787)

= Orthotylus nassatus =

Species of true bug

Orthotylus nassatus is a species of bug from a family of Miridae that can be found everywhere in Europe except for Andorra, Liechtenstein, and various European islands. and east across the Palearctic to Siberia and from Asia Minor to the Caucasus.

== Description ==
Adults are 5.0 millimetres (0.20 in) long, the colour of which is blue-green. Antennas are pale from above, with a dark line on the underside.

== Ecology ==
The species feeds on trees, like: lime, oak, and ash. They are active from July–September.
