= Orthotylus stratensis =

Scientific classification
- Kingdom: Animalia
- Phylum: Arthropoda
- Class: Insecta
- Order: Hemiptera
- Suborder: Heteroptera
- Family: Miridae
- Genus: Orthotylus
- Species: O. stratensis

Binomial name
- Orthotylus stratensis Wagner, 1963

Species of true bug

Orthotylus stratensis is a species of bug from a family of Miridae that is endemic to Greece.
