= Orthotylus minutus =

Scientific classification
- Kingdom: Animalia
- Phylum: Arthropoda
- Class: Insecta
- Order: Hemiptera
- Suborder: Heteroptera
- Family: Miridae
- Genus: Orthotylus
- Species: O. minutus

Binomial name
- Orthotylus minutus Jakovlev, 1877

Species of true bug

Orthotylus minutus is a species of bug in the Miridae family that is can be found in Bulgaria, Croatia, Greece, Italy, Moldova, Portugal, Spain, Ukraine, and northwest Russia.
