= Orthotylus junipericola =

Scientific classification
- Kingdom: Animalia
- Phylum: Arthropoda
- Class: Insecta
- Order: Hemiptera
- Suborder: Heteroptera
- Family: Miridae
- Genus: Orthotylus
- Species: O. junipericola

Binomial name
- Orthotylus junipericola Linnavuori, 1965

Species of true bug

Orthotylus junipericola is a species of bug from the Miridae family that can be found on Azores, and in countries like Bulgaria, France, Greece, Spain, and Dodecanese Islands.
