= Orthotylus salicorniae =

Scientific classification
- Kingdom: Animalia
- Phylum: Arthropoda
- Clade: Pancrustacea
- Class: Insecta
- Order: Hemiptera
- Suborder: Heteroptera
- Family: Miridae
- Genus: Orthotylus
- Species: O. salicorniae

Binomial name
- Orthotylus salicorniae Lindberg, 1953

Species of true bug

Orthotylus salicorniae is a species of bug from the Miridae family that is endemic to the Canary Islands.
