= Orthotylus curvipennis =

Scientific classification
- Kingdom: Animalia
- Phylum: Arthropoda
- Clade: Pancrustacea
- Class: Insecta
- Order: Hemiptera
- Suborder: Heteroptera
- Family: Miridae
- Genus: Orthotylus
- Species: O. curvipennis

Binomial name
- Orthotylus curvipennis Reuter, 1875

Species of true bug

Orthotylus curvipennis is a species of bug from a family of Miridae that is endemic to Sicily.
