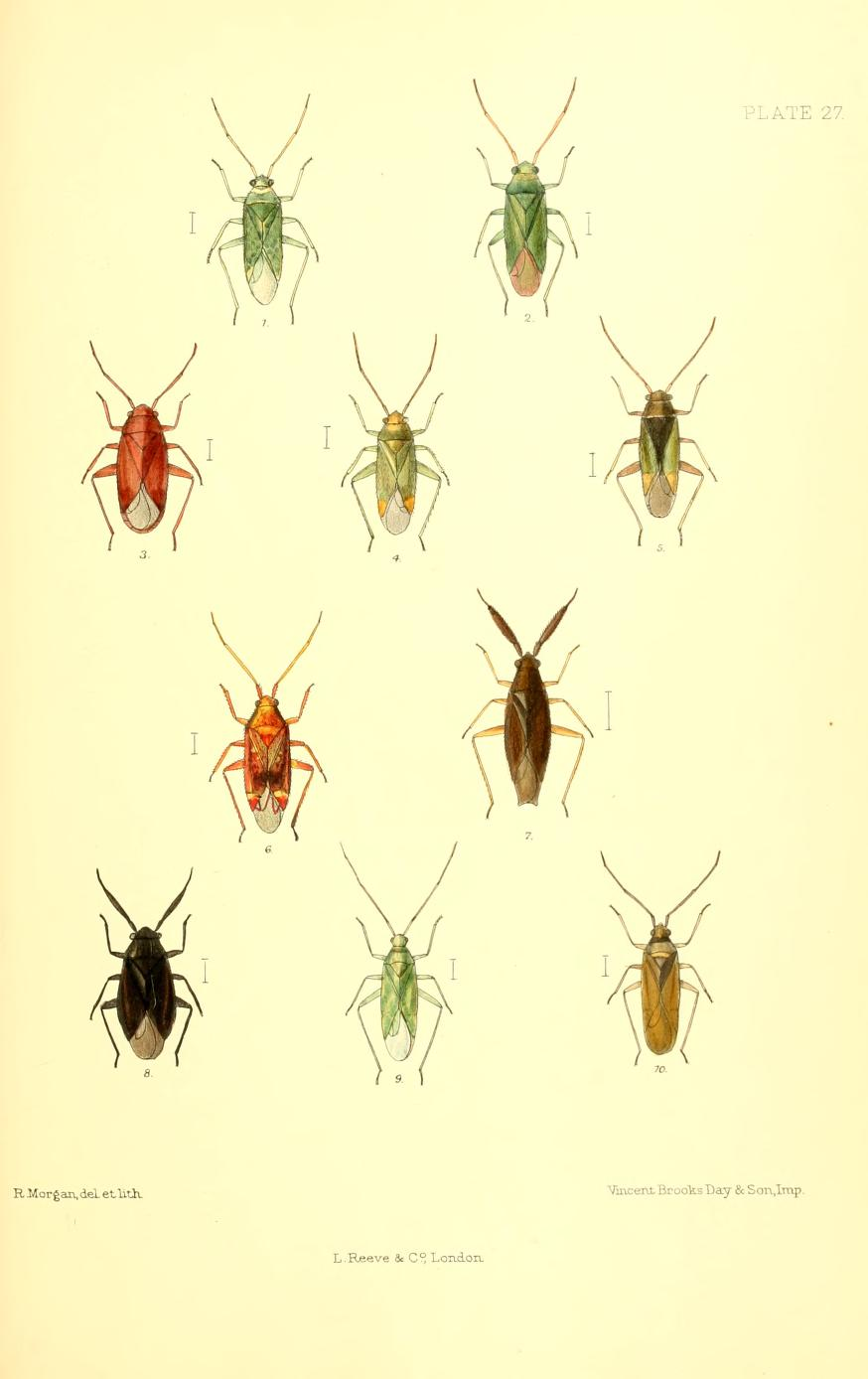
- Orthotylus moncreaffi depicted in Edward Saunders Hemiptera Heteroptera of the British Islands (figure 5)

Scientific classification
- Kingdom: Animalia
- Phylum: Arthropoda
- Class: Insecta
- Order: Hemiptera
- Suborder: Heteroptera
- Family: Miridae
- Genus: Orthotylus
- Species: O. moncreaffi

Binomial name
- Orthotylus moncreaffi (Douglas & Scott, 1874)

Synonyms
- Melanotrichus moncreaffi (Douglas & Scott, 1874); Orthotylus bicolor (Stichel, 1957); Pachylops bicolor (Douglas & Scott, 1877)

= Orthotylus moncreaffi =

Species of true bug

Orthotylus moncreaffi is a species of bug in the Miridae family that is can be found in Belgium, Denmark, France, Germany, Greece, Great Britain, Italy, Moldova, Portugal, Romania, Spain, the Netherlands, and European part of Turkey.
