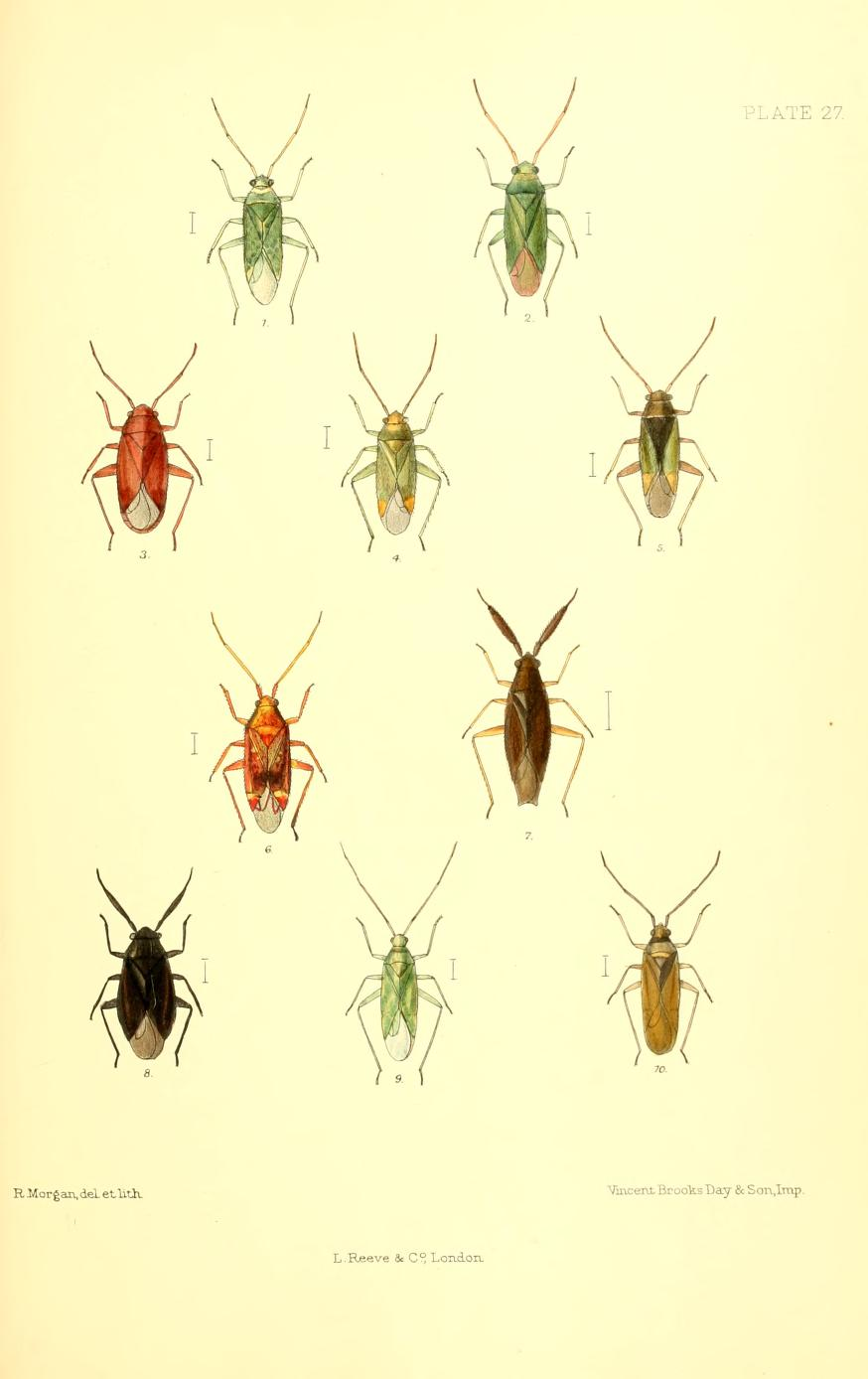
- Orthotylus rubidus depicted in Edward Saunders Hemiptera Heteroptera of the British Islands (figure 3)

Scientific classification
- Kingdom: Animalia
- Phylum: Arthropoda
- Class: Insecta
- Order: Hemiptera
- Suborder: Heteroptera
- Family: Miridae
- Genus: Orthotylus
- Species: O. rubidus

Binomial name
- Orthotylus rubidus (Puton, 1874)

= Orthotylus rubidus =

Species of true bug

Orthotylus rubidus is a species of bug from the Miridae family that can be found in European countries such as Austria, Bulgaria, France, Germany, Great Britain, Greece, Moldova, Romania, Slovenia, the Netherlands, Ukraine, and northwest Russia. It is small, red and feeds on Salicornia in saline environments.
