= Orthotylus josifovi =

Scientific classification
- Domain: Eukaryota
- Kingdom: Animalia
- Phylum: Arthropoda
- Class: Insecta
- Order: Hemiptera
- Suborder: Heteroptera
- Family: Miridae
- Genus: Orthotylus
- Species: O. josifovi

Binomial name
- Orthotylus josifovi Wagner, 1959

Species of true bug

Orthotylus josifovi is a species of bug in the Miridae family that is endemic to Bulgaria.
