= Bithia (fly) =

Scientific classification
- Kingdom: Animalia
- Phylum: Arthropoda
- Class: Insecta
- Order: Diptera
- Family: Tachinidae
- Subfamily: Tachininae
- Tribe: Leskiini
- Genus: Bithia; Robineau-Desvoidy, 1863

Type species
- Tachina spreta Meigen, 1824

Synonyms
- Cynthia Robineau-Desvoidy, 1863; Hystrichoneura Brauer & von Berganstamm, 1889; Pseudodemoticus Brauer & von Berganstamm, 1893; Pseudorhinotachina Cepelák, 1962; Rhinotachina Brauer, 1893; Rhinotachinopsis Belanovsky, 1953; Sarcobia Lioy, 1864; Sesiophaga Brauer & von Berganstamm, 1891

Genus of flies

Bithia is a genus of flies in the family Tachinidae.

== Species ==
- Bithia achanthophora (Rondani, 1861)
- Bithia ancyrensis (Villeneuve, 1942)
- Bithia argunica Richter, 1977
- Bithia demotica (Egger, 1861)
- Bithia discreta Tschorsnig, 1986
- Bithia geniculata (Zetterstedt, 1844)
- Bithia glirina (Rondani, 1861)
- Bithia golanensis (Kugler, 1971)
- Bithia gorbunovi Tschorsnig, 1993
- Bithia hermonensis Kugler, 1977
- Bithia immaculata (Herting, 1971)
- Bithia jacentkovskyi (Villeneuve, 1937)
- Bithia latigena (Herting, 1968)
- Bithia maculifacies Tschorsnig & Kara, 2002
- Bithia modesta (Meigen, 1824)
- Bithia nova Mesnil, 1973
- Bithia pauicseta Kugler, 1974
- Bithia proletaria (Egger, 1860)
- Bithia setulosa (Kugler, 1968)
- Bithia sibirica Richter, 1980
- Bithia sibirica Richter, 1980
- Bithia spreta (Meigen, 1824)
