= Orthotylus sicilianus =

Scientific classification
- Kingdom: Animalia
- Phylum: Arthropoda
- Clade: Pancrustacea
- Class: Insecta
- Order: Hemiptera
- Suborder: Heteroptera
- Family: Miridae
- Genus: Orthotylus
- Species: O. sicilianus

Binomial name
- Orthotylus sicilianus Wagner, 1964

Species of true bug

Orthotylus sicilianus is a species of bug from a family of Miridae that is endemic to Sicily.
