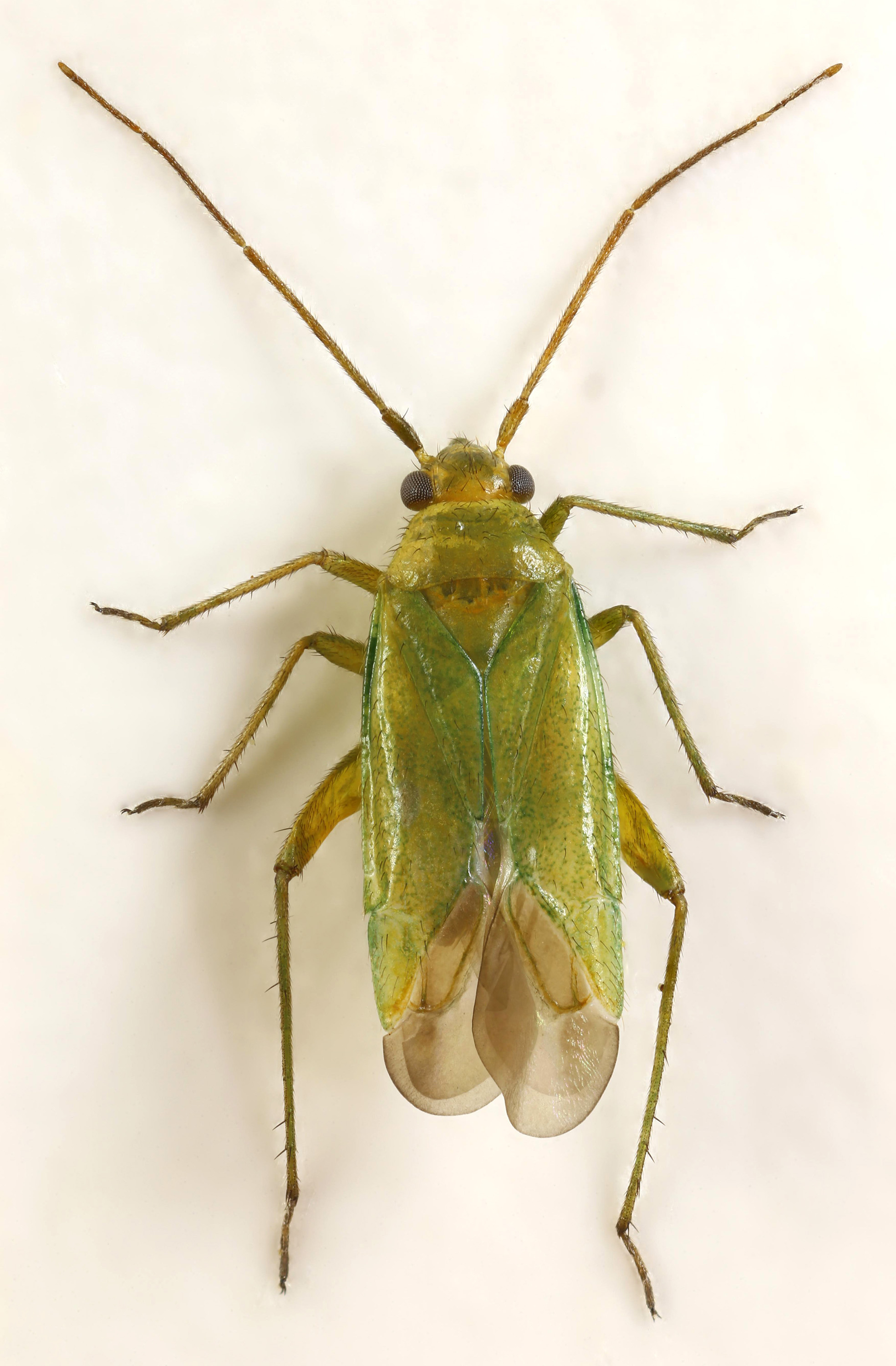
- Orthotylus ericetorum, Trawscoed, North Wales

Scientific classification
- Kingdom: Animalia
- Phylum: Arthropoda
- Clade: Pancrustacea
- Class: Insecta
- Order: Hemiptera
- Suborder: Heteroptera
- Family: Miridae
- Genus: Orthotylus
- Species: O. ericetorum

Binomial name
- Orthotylus ericetorum (Fallen, 1807)

= Orthotylus ericetorum =

Species of true bug

Orthotylus ericetorum is a Palearctic species of true bug.
