= Bithia spreta =

- Bithia spreta in Austria

Scientific classification
- Kingdom: Animalia
- Phylum: Arthropoda
- Clade: Pancrustacea
- Class: Insecta
- Order: Diptera
- Family: Tachinidae
- Subfamily: Tachininae
- Tribe: Leskiini
- Genus: Bithia
- Species: B. spreta

Binomial name
- Bithia spreta (Meigen, 1824)

Synonyms
- Tachina spreta Meigen, 1824; Myobia femorata Macquart, 1834; Tachina stachiptera Macquart, 1834; Myobia femorata Macquart, 1834; Tachina ipthime Walker, 1849; Tachina ipthime Walker, 1849; Tachina frontata Boheman, 1852; Myobia frontalis Macquart, 1854; Myobia lestremensis Macquart, 1854; Tachina cognata Egger, 1856; Myobia discreta Rondani, 1861; Cynthia pudica Robineau-Desvoidy, 1863; Tachina zetterstedti Boheman, 1864

Species of fly

Bithia spreta is a European species of fly in the family Tachinidae.

== Distribution ==
British Isles, Czech Republic, Hungary, Poland, Romania, Slovakia, Ukraine, Denmark, Sweden, Albania, Andorra, Bulgaria, Croatia, Italy, Slovenia, Spain, Austria, Belgium, France, Germany, Netherlands, Switzerland, Russia, Transcaucasia.
