= Orthotylus boreellus =

Scientific classification
- Kingdom: Animalia
- Phylum: Arthropoda
- Class: Insecta
- Order: Hemiptera
- Suborder: Heteroptera
- Family: Miridae
- Genus: Orthotylus
- Species: O. boreellus

Binomial name
- Orthotylus boreellus (Zetterstedt, 1828)

Species of true bug

Orthotylus boreellus is a species of bug from the Miridae family that can be found in Finland, Norway, Sweden, and Central Russia.
