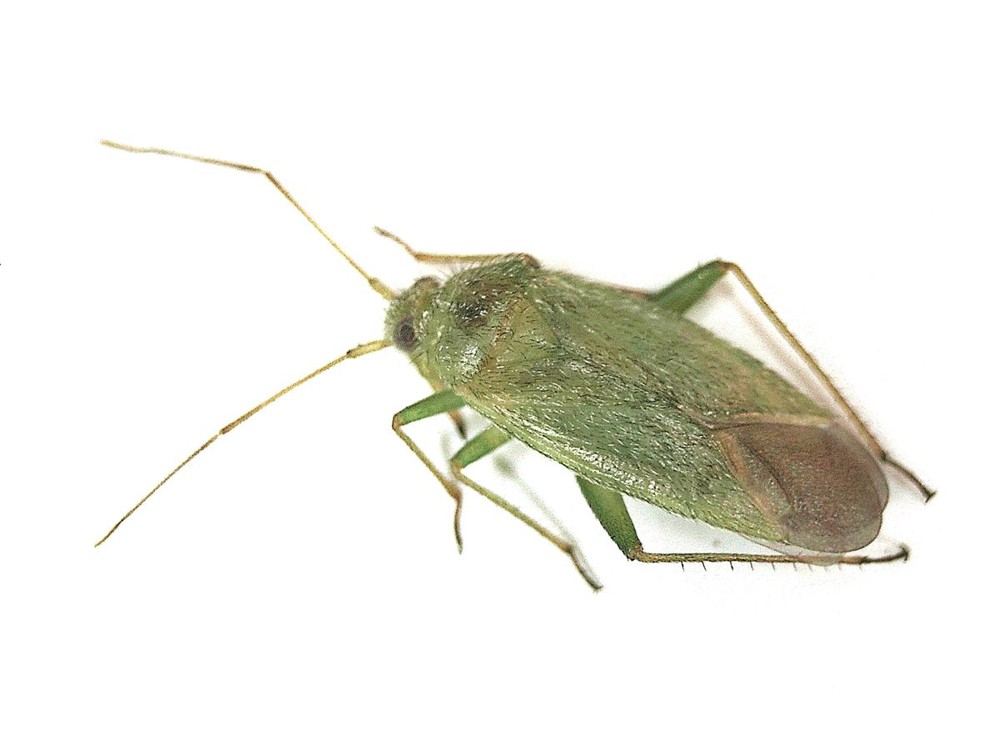
- Orthotylus virescens, Molenhoek, the Netherlands

Scientific classification
- Kingdom: Animalia
- Phylum: Arthropoda
- Class: Insecta
- Order: Hemiptera
- Suborder: Heteroptera
- Family: Miridae
- Genus: Orthotylus
- Species: O. virescens

Binomial name
- Orthotylus virescens (Douglas & Scott, 1865)

Synonyms
- Melanotrichus virescens Douglas & Scott, 1865; Orthotylus griseinervis Wagner, 1961

= Orthotylus virescens =

Species of true bug

Orthotylus virescens is a species of dark green coloured bug from the Miridae family that can be found on Crete and in such countries as Andorra, Bulgaria, Hungary, Poland, Romania, all states of former Yugoslavia, and Western Europe (except Iceland) It also occurs in south Scandinavia, Asia Minor and the Middle East and as an introduction in North America. The members of the species feed on Cytisus scoparius.
