= Orthotylus lethierryi =

Scientific classification
- Kingdom: Animalia
- Phylum: Arthropoda
- Clade: Pancrustacea
- Class: Insecta
- Order: Hemiptera
- Suborder: Heteroptera
- Family: Miridae
- Genus: Orthotylus
- Species: O. lethierryi

Binomial name
- Orthotylus lethierryi Reuter, 1875

Species of true bug

Orthotylus lethierryi is a species of bug in the Miridae family that is endemic to Sicily.
