= Orthotylus schoberiae =

Scientific classification
- Kingdom: Animalia
- Phylum: Arthropoda
- Class: Insecta
- Order: Hemiptera
- Suborder: Heteroptera
- Family: Miridae
- Genus: Orthotylus
- Species: O. schoberiae

Binomial name
- Orthotylus schoberiae Reuter, 1876

Species of true bug

Orthotylus schoberiae is a species of bug from the Miridae family that can be found in Austria, Bulgaria, Croatia, Germany, Italy, Moldova, Romania, Slovakia, Spain, Ukraine, and northwest Russia.
