= Orthotylus divisus =

Scientific classification
- Kingdom: Animalia
- Phylum: Arthropoda
- Class: Insecta
- Order: Hemiptera
- Suborder: Heteroptera
- Family: Miridae
- Genus: Orthotylus
- Species: O. divisus

Binomial name
- Orthotylus divisus Linnavuori, 1961

Species of true bug

Orthotylus divisus is a species of bug from a family of Miridae that can be found in Greece, Spain, and on islands such as Sardinia, Sicily, and Canary Islands.
