= Orthotylus siuranus =

Scientific classification
- Kingdom: Animalia
- Phylum: Arthropoda
- Class: Insecta
- Order: Hemiptera
- Suborder: Heteroptera
- Family: Miridae
- Genus: Orthotylus
- Species: O. siuranus

Binomial name
- Orthotylus siuranus Wagner, 1964

Species of true bug

Orthotylus siuranus is a species of bug from a family of Miridae that is endemic to Spain.
