= Orthotylus blascoi =

Scientific classification
- Kingdom: Animalia
- Phylum: Arthropoda
- Class: Insecta
- Order: Hemiptera
- Suborder: Heteroptera
- Family: Miridae
- Genus: Orthotylus
- Species: O. blascoi

Binomial name
- Orthotylus blascoi J. Ribes, 1991

Species of true bug

Orthotylus blascoi is a species of bug from the Miridae family that is endemic to Spain.
