= Orthotylus flaviceps =

Scientific classification
- Kingdom: Animalia
- Phylum: Arthropoda
- Class: Insecta
- Order: Hemiptera
- Suborder: Heteroptera
- Family: Miridae
- Genus: Orthotylus
- Species: O. flaviceps

Binomial name
- Orthotylus flaviceps Wagner, 1974

Species of true bug

Orthotylus flaviceps is a species of bug in the Miridae family that can be found in the Nearctic and Neotropical realms and on Cyprus.
