= Orthotylus caprai =

Scientific classification
- Kingdom: Animalia
- Phylum: Arthropoda
- Class: Insecta
- Order: Hemiptera
- Suborder: Heteroptera
- Family: Miridae
- Genus: Orthotylus
- Species: O. caprai

Binomial name
- Orthotylus caprai Wagner, 1955

Species of true bug

Orthotylus caprai is a species of bug from the Miridae family that can be found in European countries such as Croatia, Germany, Great Britain, Switzerland and the island of Sardinia.
