= Orthotylus submarginatus =

Scientific classification
- Kingdom: Animalia
- Phylum: Arthropoda
- Class: Insecta
- Order: Hemiptera
- Suborder: Heteroptera
- Family: Miridae
- Genus: Orthotylus
- Species: O. submarginatus

Binomial name
- Orthotylus submarginatus (Say, 1832)

Species of true bug

Orthotylus submarginatus is a species of plant bug in the family Miridae. It is found in North America.
