= Orthotylus halophilus =

Scientific classification
- Kingdom: Animalia
- Phylum: Arthropoda
- Clade: Pancrustacea
- Class: Insecta
- Order: Hemiptera
- Suborder: Heteroptera
- Family: Miridae
- Genus: Orthotylus
- Species: O. halophilus

Binomial name
- Orthotylus halophilus Lindberg, 1953

Species of true bug

Orthotylus halophilus is a species of bug from the family Miridae that is endemic to the Canary Islands.
