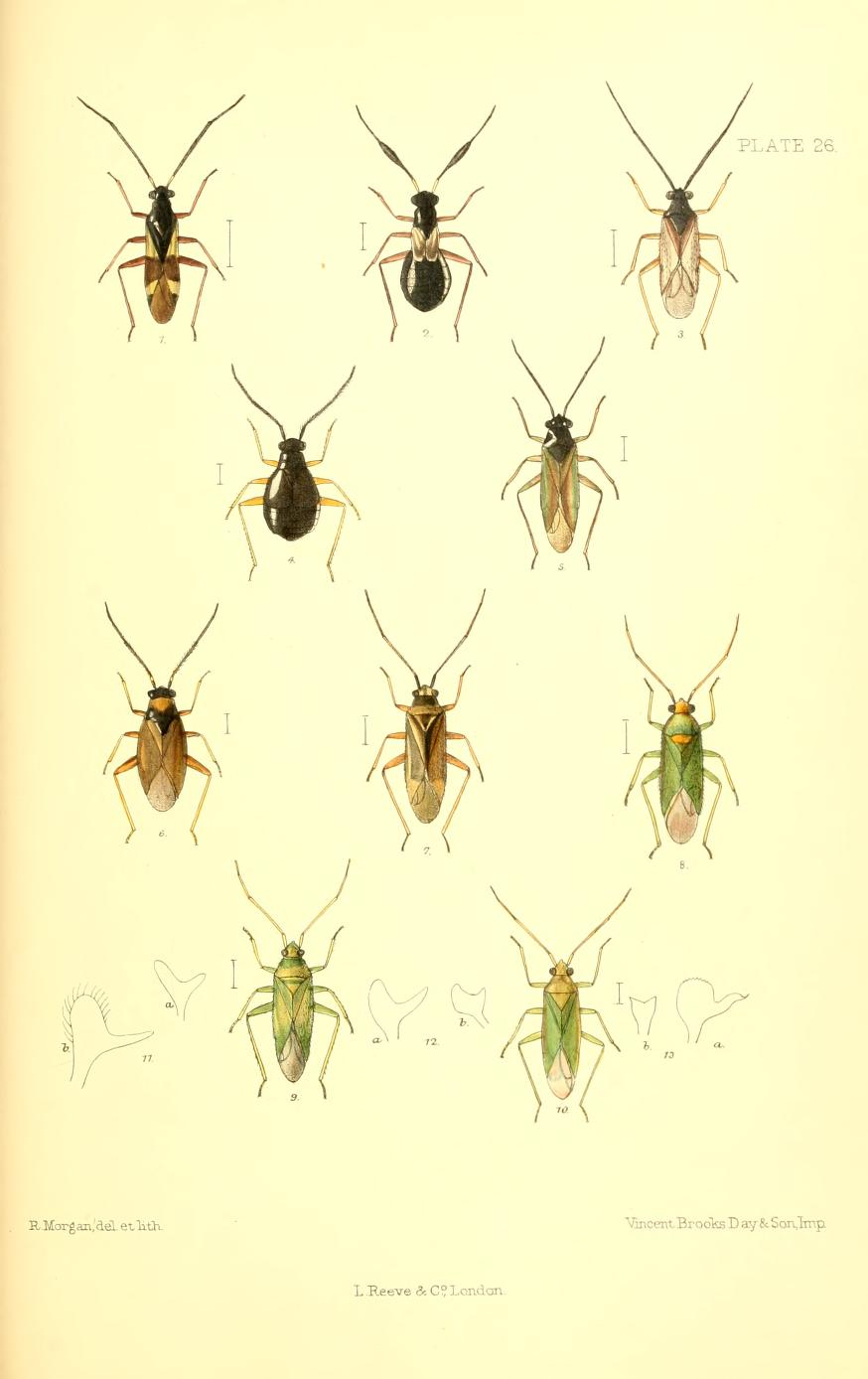
- Orthotylus ochrotrichus depicted in Edward Saunders Hemiptera Heteroptera of the British Islands (figure 13 a, b)

Scientific classification
- Kingdom: Animalia
- Phylum: Arthropoda
- Class: Insecta
- Order: Hemiptera
- Suborder: Heteroptera
- Family: Miridae
- Genus: Orthotylus
- Species: O. ochrotrichus

Binomial name
- Orthotylus ochrotrichus Fieber, 1864

= Orthotylus ochrotrichus =

Species of true bug

Orthotylus ochrotrichus is a species of bug from the Miridae family that can be found in European countries such as France, Great Britain, Ireland, Spain, and the Netherlands.
