= Orthotylus quercicola =

Scientific classification
- Kingdom: Animalia
- Phylum: Arthropoda
- Class: Insecta
- Order: Hemiptera
- Suborder: Heteroptera
- Family: Miridae
- Genus: Orthotylus
- Species: O. quercicola

Binomial name
- Orthotylus quercicola Reuter, 1885

Species of true bug

Orthotylus quercicola is a species of bug from the Miridae family that can be found in European countries such as Austria, Bosnia and Herzegovina, Bulgaria, Czech Republic, Greece, Hungary, Slovakia, and Slovenia.
