= Orthotylus pusillus =

Scientific classification
- Kingdom: Animalia
- Phylum: Arthropoda
- Class: Insecta
- Order: Hemiptera
- Suborder: Heteroptera
- Family: Miridae
- Genus: Orthotylus
- Species: O. pusillus

Binomial name
- Orthotylus pusillus Reuter, 1883

Species of true bug

Orthotylus pusillus is a species of bug in the Miridae family that is can be found in Greece, Spain, and on the island of Sicily. It is also found in tropical region of Africa.
