= Orthotylus jordii =

Scientific classification
- Kingdom: Animalia
- Phylum: Arthropoda
- Class: Insecta
- Order: Hemiptera
- Suborder: Heteroptera
- Family: Miridae
- Genus: Orthotylus
- Species: O. jordii

Binomial name
- Orthotylus jordii Pagola-Carte & Zabalegui, 2006

Species of true bug

Orthotylus jordii is a bug species from the Miridae family that is endemic to Spain. It is under the subgenus Parapachylops subspecies.
