= Orthotylus beieri =

Scientific classification
- Kingdom: Animalia
- Phylum: Arthropoda
- Class: Insecta
- Order: Hemiptera
- Suborder: Heteroptera
- Family: Miridae
- Genus: Orthotylus
- Species: O. beieri

Binomial name
- Orthotylus beieri Wagner, 1942

Species of true bug

Orthotylus beieri is a species of bug from the Miridae family that can be found in France, Slovenia, and Spain.
