= Orthotylus interpositus =

Scientific classification
- Kingdom: Animalia
- Phylum: Arthropoda
- Class: Insecta
- Order: Hemiptera
- Suborder: Heteroptera
- Family: Miridae
- Genus: Orthotylus
- Species: O. interpositus

Binomial name
- Orthotylus interpositus Schmidt, 1938

Species of true bug

Orthotylus interpositus is a species of bug from the Miridae family that can be found in European countries such as Albania, Austria, Bulgaria, Czech Republic, France, Germany, Italy, Luxembourg, Poland, Romania, Slovakia, Slovenia, Spain, Switzerland, Ukraine, and southern part of Russia.
