= Orthotylus parvulus =

Scientific classification
- Kingdom: Animalia
- Phylum: Arthropoda
- Class: Insecta
- Order: Hemiptera
- Suborder: Heteroptera
- Family: Miridae
- Genus: Orthotylus
- Species: O. parvulus

Binomial name
- Orthotylus parvulus Reuter, 1879

Species of true bug

Orthotylus parvulus is a species of bug in the Miridae family that can be found in Bulgaria, Italy, Ukraine, and northwest Russia.
