= Orthotylus creticus =

Scientific classification
- Kingdom: Animalia
- Phylum: Arthropoda
- Class: Insecta
- Order: Hemiptera
- Suborder: Heteroptera
- Family: Miridae
- Genus: Orthotylus
- Species: O. creticus

Binomial name
- Orthotylus creticus Wagner, 1977

Species of true bug

Orthotylus creticus is a species of bug from a family of Miridae that is endemic to Crete.
