= Orthotylus modestus =

Scientific classification
- Kingdom: Animalia
- Phylum: Arthropoda
- Class: Insecta
- Order: Hemiptera
- Suborder: Heteroptera
- Family: Miridae
- Genus: Orthotylus
- Species: O. modestus

Binomial name
- Orthotylus modestus Van Duzee, 1916

Species of true bug

Orthotylus modestus is a species of plant bug in the family Miridae. It is found in North America.

== Subspecies ==
These two subspecies belong to the species Orthotylus modestus:

- Orthotylus modestus immaculatus Knight, 1923
- Orthotylus modestus modestus Van Duzee, 1916
