= Orthotylus obscurus =

Scientific classification
- Kingdom: Animalia
- Phylum: Arthropoda
- Class: Insecta
- Order: Hemiptera
- Suborder: Heteroptera
- Family: Miridae
- Genus: Orthotylus
- Species: O. obscurus

Binomial name
- Orthotylus obscurus Reuter, 1875

Species of true bug

Orthotylus obscurus is a species of bug in the Miridae family that is can be found in Austria, Bulgaria, Croatia, France, Germany, Italy, Romania, Switzerland, Sweden, and European part of Turkey. It is a type of plant parasite mostly found in its host plants which belong to Pinaceae or the pine family.
