= Orthotylus candidatus =

Scientific classification
- Kingdom: Animalia
- Phylum: Arthropoda
- Class: Insecta
- Order: Hemiptera
- Suborder: Heteroptera
- Family: Miridae
- Tribe: Orthotylini
- Genus: Orthotylus
- Species: O. candidatus

Binomial name
- Orthotylus candidatus Van Duzee, 1916

Species of true bug

Orthotylus candidatus is a species of plant bug in the family Miridae. It is found in North America.
