= Orthotylus globiceps =

Scientific classification
- Kingdom: Animalia
- Phylum: Arthropoda
- Class: Insecta
- Order: Hemiptera
- Suborder: Heteroptera
- Family: Miridae
- Genus: Orthotylus
- Species: O. globiceps

Binomial name
- Orthotylus globiceps Wagner, 1976

Species of true bug

Orthotylus globiceps is a species of bug in the Miridae family that is endemic to Spain.
