= Orthotylus dimorphus =

Scientific classification
- Kingdom: Animalia
- Phylum: Arthropoda
- Class: Insecta
- Order: Hemiptera
- Suborder: Heteroptera
- Family: Miridae
- Genus: Orthotylus
- Species: O. dimorphus

Binomial name
- Orthotylus dimorphus Wagner, 1958

Species of true bug

Orthotylus dimorphus is a species of bug in the Miridae family that can be found on Cyprus and Balearic Islands.
