= Orthotylus salsolae =

Scientific classification
- Kingdom: Animalia
- Phylum: Arthropoda
- Class: Insecta
- Order: Hemiptera
- Suborder: Heteroptera
- Family: Miridae
- Genus: Orthotylus
- Species: O. salsolae

Binomial name
- Orthotylus salsolae Reuter, 1875

Species of true bug

Orthotylus salsolae is a species of bug from the Miridae family that can be found in France, Spain, and the island of Sicily.
