= Orthotylus palustris =

Scientific classification
- Kingdom: Animalia
- Phylum: Arthropoda
- Class: Insecta
- Order: Hemiptera
- Suborder: Heteroptera
- Family: Miridae
- Genus: Orthotylus
- Species: O. palustris

Binomial name
- Orthotylus palustris Reuter, 1888

Species of true bug

Orthotylus palustris is a species of bug in the Miridae family that is can be found in Albania, Croatia, France, Greece, Italy, Slovenia, and Spain.
