= Orthotylus calichi =

Scientific classification
- Kingdom: Animalia
- Phylum: Arthropoda
- Class: Insecta
- Order: Hemiptera
- Suborder: Heteroptera
- Family: Miridae
- Genus: Orthotylus
- Species: O. calichi

Binomial name
- Orthotylus calichi Tamanini, 1980

Species of true bug

Orthotylus calichi is a species of bug from a family of Miridae that is endemic to Sardinia.
