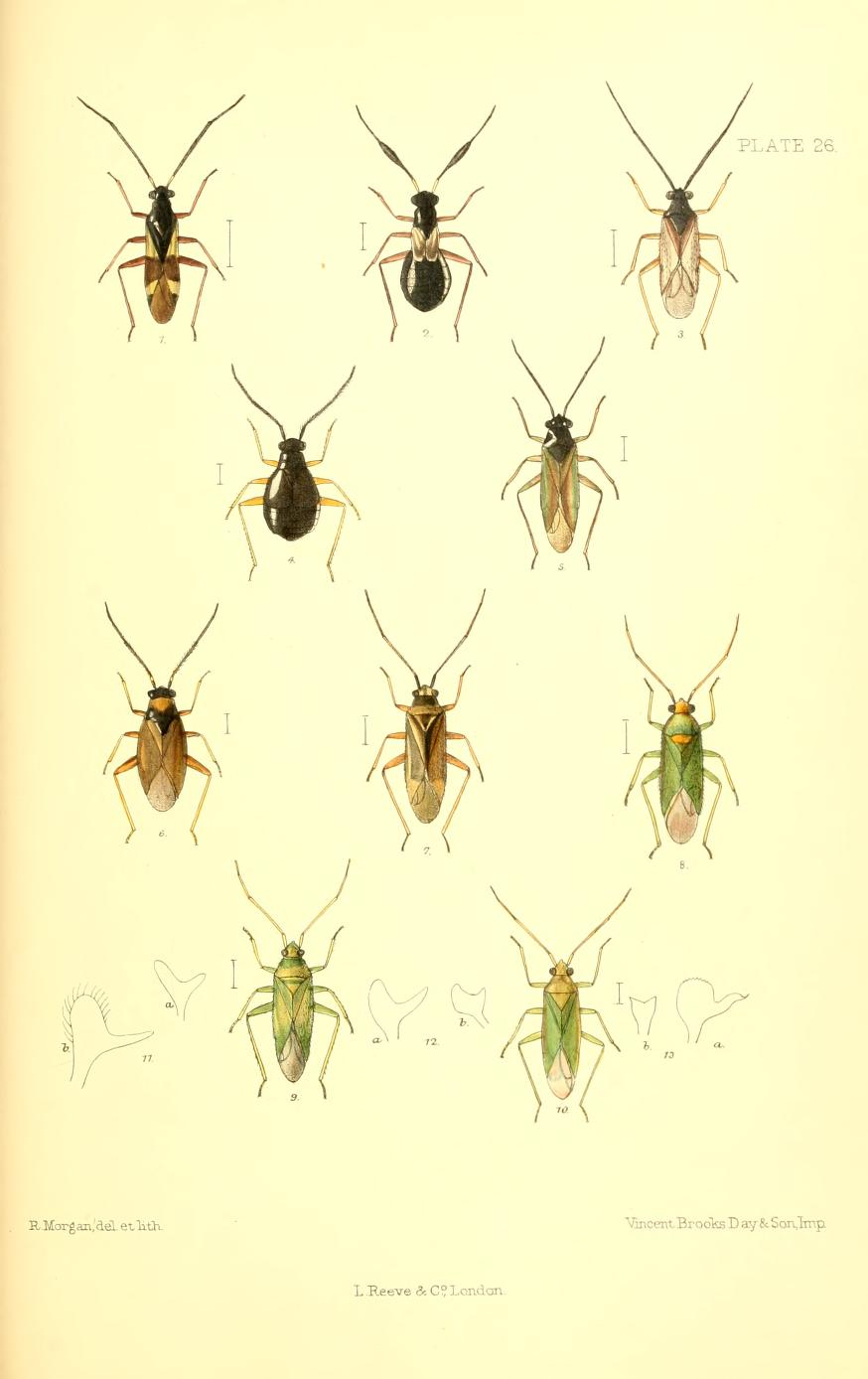
- Orthotylus viridinervis depicted in Edward Saunders Hemiptera Heteroptera of the British Islands (figure 10)

Scientific classification
- Kingdom: Animalia
- Phylum: Arthropoda
- Class: Insecta
- Order: Hemiptera
- Suborder: Heteroptera
- Family: Miridae
- Genus: Orthotylus
- Species: O. viridinervis

Binomial name
- Orthotylus viridinervis (Kirschbaum, 1856)

= Orthotylus viridinervis =

Species of true bug

Orthotylus viridinervis is a species of green coloured bug from a family of Miridae that can be found everywhere in Europe except for Albania, Andorra, Croatia, Liechtenstein, Lithuania, Malta, Moldova, North Macedonia, Portugal, and most part of Russia.
