= Orthotylus verticatus =

Scientific classification
- Kingdom: Animalia
- Phylum: Arthropoda
- Class: Insecta
- Order: Hemiptera
- Suborder: Heteroptera
- Family: Miridae
- Genus: Orthotylus
- Species: O. verticatus

Binomial name
- Orthotylus verticatus Wagner, 1958

Species of true bug

Orthotylus verticatus is a species of bug from a family of Miridae that can be found in France and Spain.
