= Orthotylus digitus =

Scientific classification
- Kingdom: Animalia
- Phylum: Arthropoda
- Class: Insecta
- Order: Hemiptera
- Suborder: Heteroptera
- Family: Miridae
- Genus: Orthotylus
- Species: O. digitus

Binomial name
- Orthotylus digitus Carapezza, 1997

Species of true bug

Orthotylus digitus is a species of bug from the Miridae family that is endemic to France.
