= Orthotylus intricatus =

Scientific classification
- Kingdom: Animalia
- Phylum: Arthropoda
- Class: Insecta
- Order: Hemiptera
- Suborder: Heteroptera
- Family: Miridae
- Genus: Orthotylus
- Species: O. intricatus

Binomial name
- Orthotylus intricatus Wagner, 1975

Species of true bug

Orthotylus intricatus is a species of bug in the Miridae family that is endemic to North Aegean islands.
