= Orthotylus bureschi =

Scientific classification
- Kingdom: Animalia
- Phylum: Arthropoda
- Class: Insecta
- Order: Hemiptera
- Suborder: Heteroptera
- Family: Miridae
- Genus: Orthotylus
- Species: O. bureschi

Binomial name
- Orthotylus bureschi Josifov, 1969

Species of true bug

Orthotylus bureschi is a species of bug from the Miridae family that can be found in European countries such as Bulgaria and Greece.
