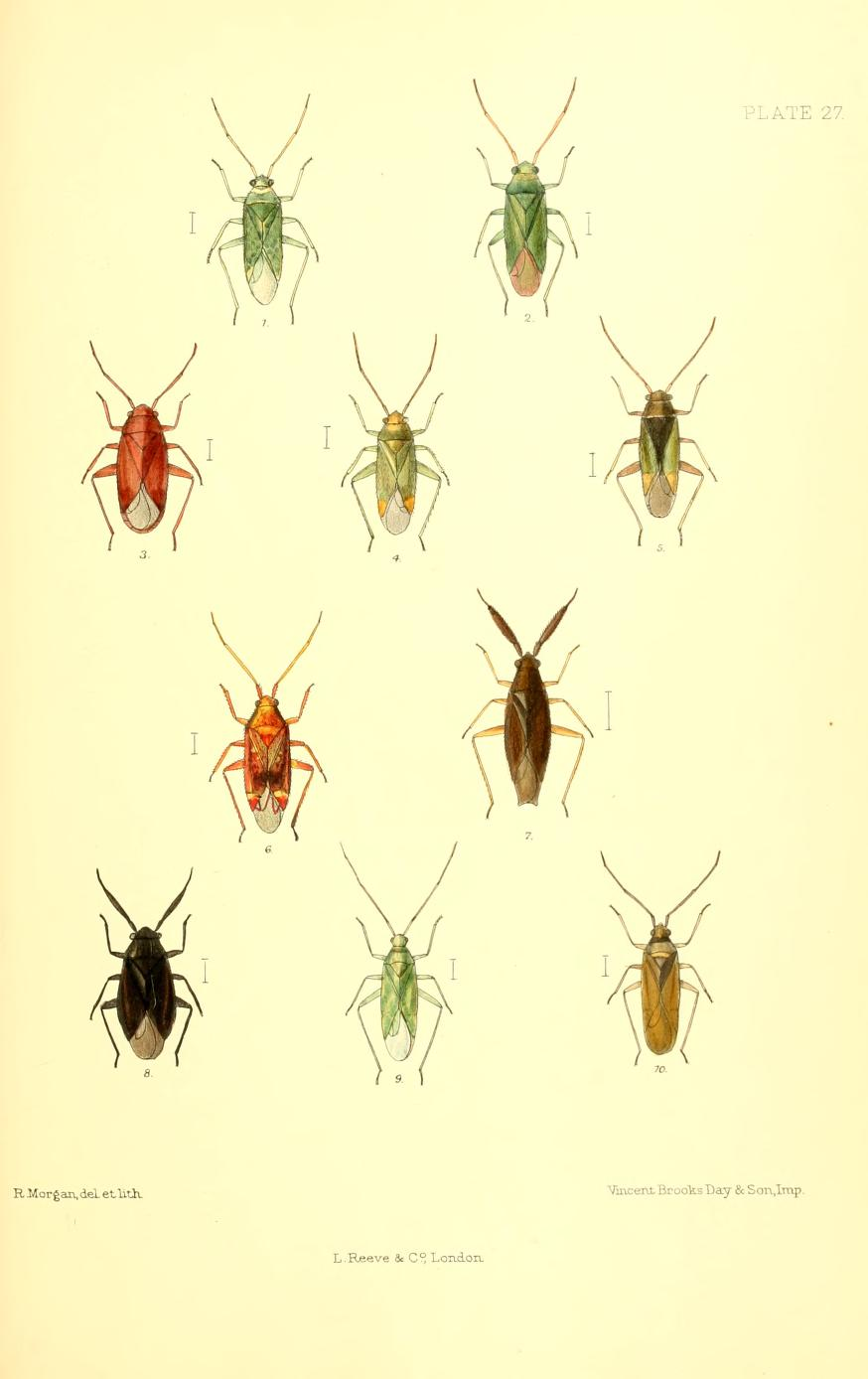
- Orthotylus flavosparsus depicted in Edward Saunders Hemiptera Heteroptera of the British Islands (figure 1)

Scientific classification
- Kingdom: Animalia
- Phylum: Arthropoda
- Class: Insecta
- Order: Hemiptera
- Suborder: Heteroptera
- Family: Miridae
- Genus: Orthotylus
- Species: O. flavosparsus

Binomial name
- Orthotylus flavosparsus (C. R. Sahlberg, 1841)

Synonyms
- Melanotrichus falvosparsus; Orthotylus parallelus Lindberg, 1927; Orthotylus viridipunctatus Reuter, 1899; Orthotylus nigropilosus Lindberg, 1934; Orthotylus viridipennis Dahlbom, 1851; Orthotylus guttula Matsumura 1917; Orthotylus bicolor Carvalho & Carpintero 1986; Orthotylus pulchellus Reuter 1874; Orthotylus deflavus Stichel 1957; Phytocoris flavosparsus Sahlberg, C., 1841; Phytocoris viridipennis Dahlbom 1851

= Orthotylus flavosparsus =

Species of true bug

Orthotylus flavosparsus is a species of plant-eating bug in the Miridae family, which is found everywhere in Europe except for Albania and Iceland. It was introduced to North America.

== Description ==
The adult Orthotylus flavosparsus is normally about 4 millimetres (0.16 in) in length, and green in colour.

== Ecology ==
The species can be found on oraches and chenopods, which is their main food.
