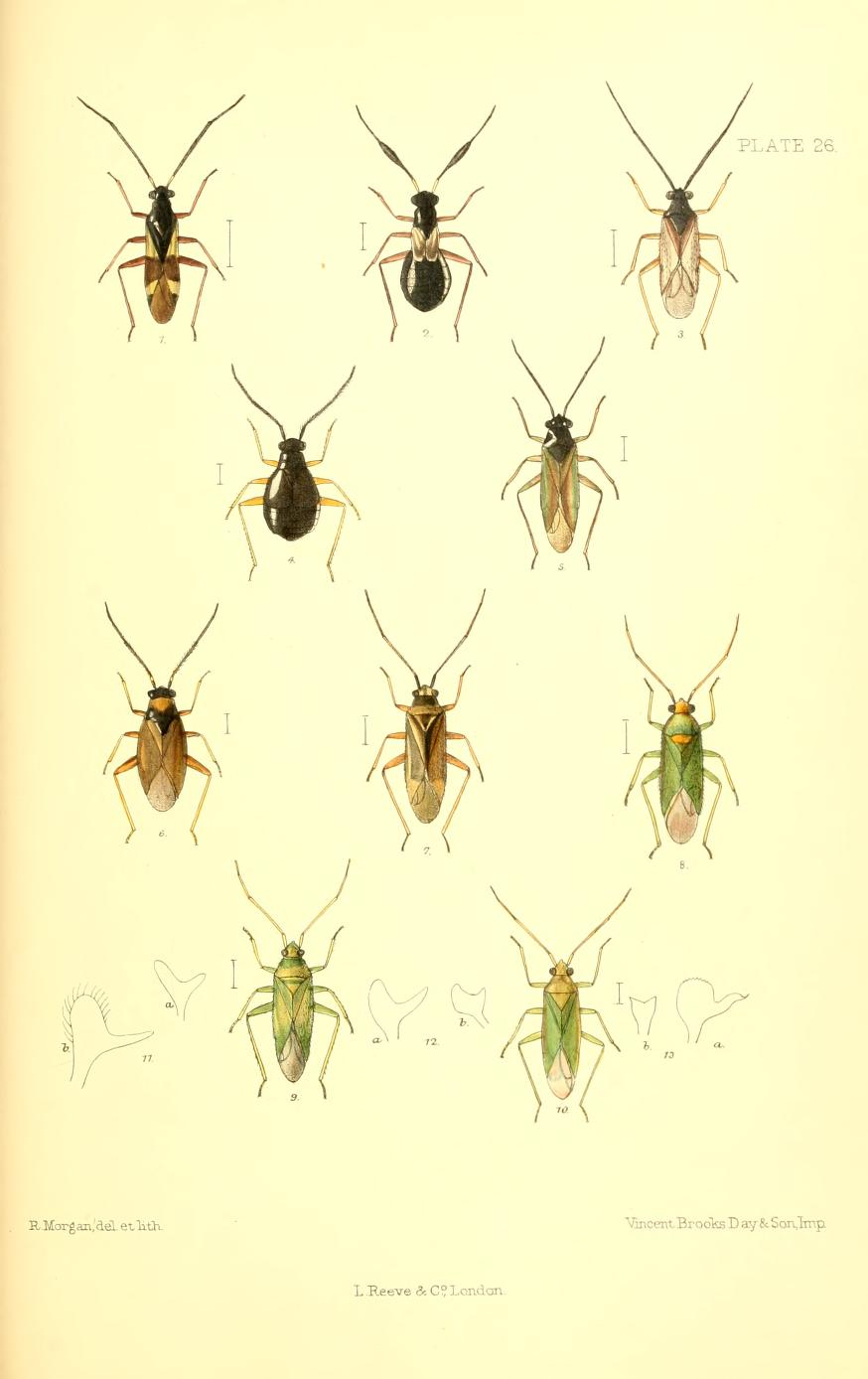
- Orthotylus bilineatus depicted in Edward Saunders Hemiptera Heteroptera of the British Islands (figure 7)

Scientific classification
- Kingdom: Animalia
- Phylum: Arthropoda
- Class: Insecta
- Order: Hemiptera
- Suborder: Heteroptera
- Family: Miridae
- Genus: Orthotylus
- Species: O. bilineatus

Binomial name
- Orthotylus bilineatus (Fallén, 1807)

= Orthotylus bilineatus =

Species of true bug

Orthotylus bilineatus is a species of bug from the Miridae family that can be found everywhere in Europe (except for Belgium, Greece, Lithuania, Portugal, and Yugoslavian states). To the east it spreads over the Palearctic to the Russian Far East and Siberia to China and Japan.

== Description ==
The colour of the species is dark green with black stripes on the sides, and antennas.

== Distribution ==
The species can be found throughout Finland, Norway, Slovenia, Sweden, and the British Isles.

== Ecology ==
The species prefers feeding on aspen, but may also be found on grey poplar.
