= Edouard Perris =

French explorer and entomologist (1808–1878)

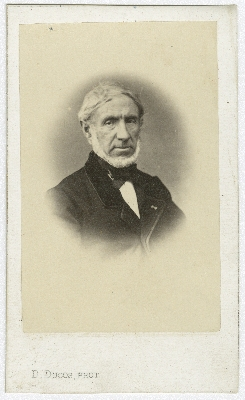
Edouard Perris (1808–1878)

Edouard Perris full name Jean-Pierre Omer Anne Edouard Perris (1808 in Pau – 1878 in Mont-de-Marsan) was a French explorer and entomologist who specialised in Coleoptera and to a lesser extent Diptera and other orders. He was Chef de division à la préfecture des Landes. Perris was a Member of Société Entomologique de France. His collection is held by École nationale supérieure agronomique de Montpellier excepting Cicindelidae, Carabini end Lebiini which are held by Museum Dax, Landes.

== Biography ==
Jean Pierre Omer Anne Édouard Perris was born in Pau in June 1808 and studied at the college in Aire-sur-l'Adour. He held successive positions as director of the college in Saint-Palais, Pyrénées-Atlantiques, secretary of the sub-prefecture of Dax, and then head of division at the prefecture of Landes in Mont-de-Marsan. At the same time, he developed an interest in natural history and met Léon Jean Marie Dufour, a physician and naturalist, with whom he wrote several articles on entomology.

In 1840, he wanted to start a silk Sericulture and went to Sénart to study silkworm breeding techniques. In Paris, he met with members of the Société entomologique de France, which he had joined in 1838 and of which he would become an honorary member in 1874. Back in the Landes (department) region, he set up silkworm farms and Morus (plant) plantations. Eventually, his facilities burned down and he abandoned sericulture.

He was a member of the Société entomologique de France (1838–1878), the Linnean Society of Lyon (1846–1878), the Agricultural Society of Lyon (1848–1878), the Royal Society of Sciences of Liège (1852–1878), the Lille Society of Sciences, Agriculture, and Arts (1852–1878), and the Institute of the Provinces (1877–1878). He was the first honorary member of the Borda Society when it was founded in 1876.

He married Clara Lagarrigue in 1845, traveled to Spain with Dufour in 1854, and retired from the prefecture in 1858. Édouard Perris died on February 10, 1878, at the age of 69, from an abdominal tumor. He is buried in the Centre cemetery in Mont-de-Marsan.

== Works ==
partial list (prolific author)

- Perris, E. (1839) Notice sur quelques Diptères nouveaux. Annales de la Société Entomologique de France 8: 47–57.
- Perris, E. (1840) Observations sur les insectes que habitant les galles de l'Ulex nanus et du Papaver dubium. Annales de la Société Entomologique de France 9:89-99.
- Perris, E. (1841) Observations sur les insectes qui vivent dans la galle de l'ortie dioïque, Urtica dioica L. Annales de la Société Entomologique de France 9:401-406
- Perris, E. (1847). Notes pour servir à l'histoire des Ceratopogon. Annales de la Société Entomologique de France (2) 5:555-569.
- Perris, E. (1855) Histoire des métamorphoses de divers insectes (Liodes castanea, Cryptohypnus riparius, Ebaeus albifrons, Lagria lata, etc.). Memoires de la Société Scientifique de Leige, 10, 233–280.
- Perris, E. (1857). Nouvelles excursions dans les Grandes Landes, Hémiptères. Annales de al Societe Linneenne de Lyon (n.s.) 4: 3–184.
- Perris, E. (1870). Histoire des Insectes du Pin maritime. Diptères. Annales de la Société Entomologique de France (2) 5:555 (4) 10:135-232, pls. 1-5
- Perris, É. (1876) Nouvelles promenades entomologiques. Annales de la Société Entomologique de France (5) 6:177-244
- Perris, E. (1877) Larves de Coléoptères. Annales de la Société Linnéenne de Lyon 22: 259–418

== Bibliography ==
- Anonym 1878 [Perris, J. O. A. E.] The Entomologist's Monthly Magazine, Third Series, London 14, pp. 263
- Constantin, R. 1992: Memorial des Coléopteristes Français. Bulletin de liaison de l'Association des Coléoptéristes de la région parisienne, Paris (Suppl. 14), S. 1-92, pp. 71
- Lhoste, J. 1987: Les entomologistes français. 1750 - 1950. INRA (Institut National de la Recherche Agronomique), 1-355 S., B15: A 1036, pp. 147, Portr., 266-268
