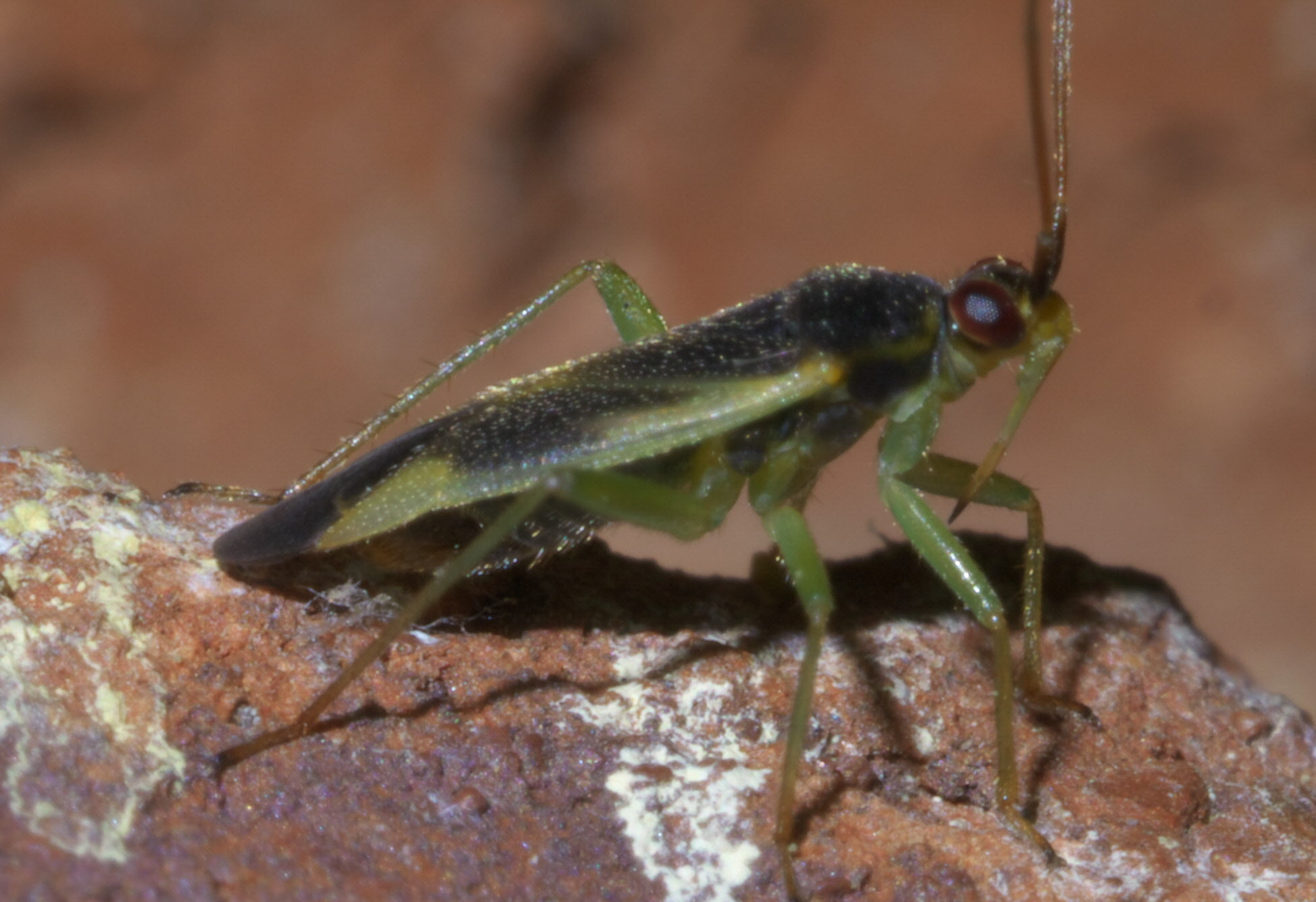

Scientific classification
- Kingdom: Animalia
- Phylum: Arthropoda
- Clade: Pancrustacea
- Class: Insecta
- Order: Hemiptera
- Suborder: Heteroptera
- Family: Miridae
- Subfamily: Orthotylinae
- Tribe: Orthotylini
- Genus: Orthotylus; Fieber, 1858

Synonyms
- Allocotus Puton, 1874; Diommatus Uhler, 1887; Ericinellus Linnavuori, 1994; Halocapsus Puton, 1878; Kiiorthotylus Yasunaga, 1993; Litocoris Fieber, 1860; Litosoma Douglas and Scott, 1865; Macrotyloides Van Duzee, 1916; Melanotrichus Reuter, 1875; Neomecomma Southwood, 1953; Neopachylops Wagner, 1956; Pachylops Fieber, 1858; Parapachylops Ehanno and Matocq, 1990; Pinocapsus Southwood, 1953; Pseudorthotylus Poppius, 1914; Tichorhinus Fieber, 1858

= Orthotylus =

Genus of bugs

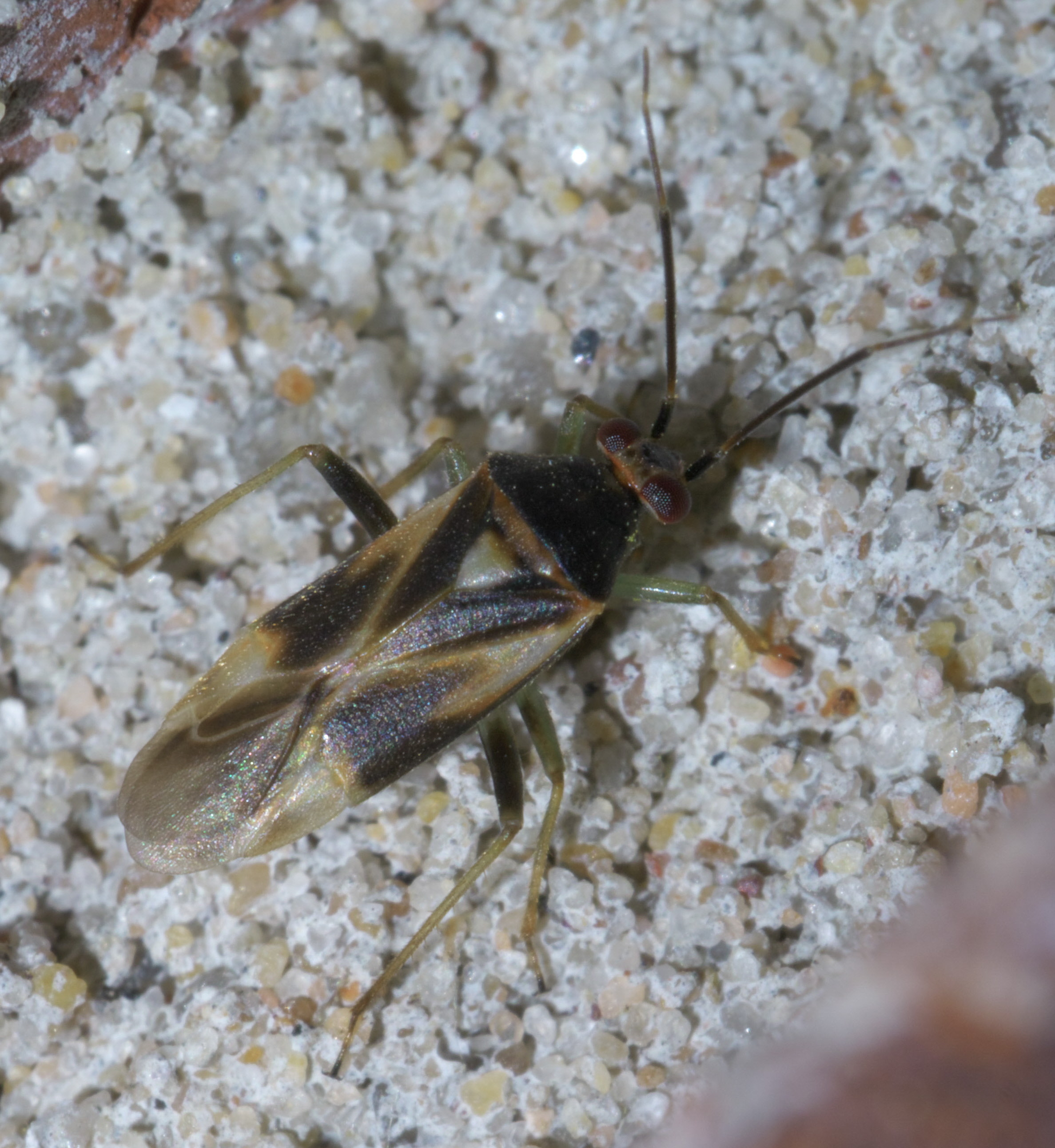

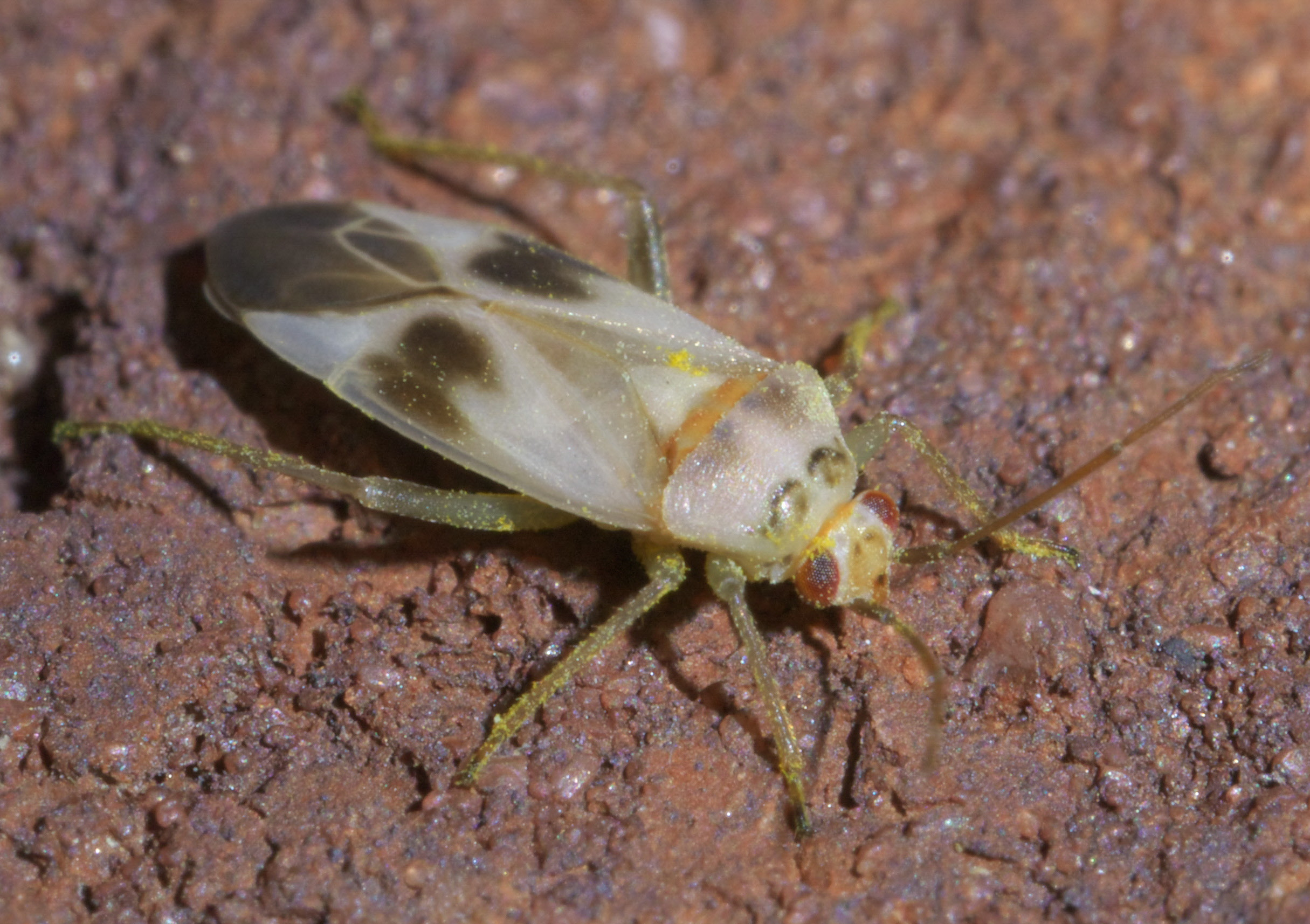

Orthotylus is a genus of bugs from the family Miridae. There are more than 300 described species worldwide. The sheer number of species has led to the recognition of subgenera and groups, some of which may be promoted to genus level. Yamsunaga recognized the genus as non-monophyletic, and without consistent diagnostic characteristics.

Most of the species are plant feeders, some of them attacking important crops; however, some species also prey on the larvae of lepidoptera and diptera, as well as on psyllids and aphids.

== Partial list of subgenera ==
- Ericinellus type species: Orthotylus ericinellae
- Orthotylus
  - compactus group, type: Orthotylus compactus
  - priesneri group, type: Orthotylus priesneri
- Melanotrichus type species: Orthotylus flavosparsus
- Pseudorthotylus type species: Orthotylus bilineatus

== See also ==
- List of Orthotylus species
