= Melothria pringlei =

Scientific classification
- Kingdom: Plantae
- Clade: Tracheophytes
- Clade: Angiosperms
- Clade: Eudicots
- Clade: Rosids
- Order: Cucurbitales
- Family: Cucurbitaceae
- Genus: Melothria
- Species: M. pringlei

Binomial name
- Melothria pringlei (S.Watson) Mart.Crov.

Synonyms
- Apodanthera pringlei S.Watson

Species of flowering plant

Melothria pringlei is a species of flowering plant in the cucurbit family, with a native range spanning Mexico to Honduras. It was first described by Sereno Watson in 1890 and placed in the genus Apodanthera, but was reclassified as belonging to the genus Melothria in 1954 by Raul Martinez Crovetto. Melothria pringlei has a prostrate habit, with scabrous stems that root where they touch the ground. Its leaves are scabrous and lobed, and grow 1–3 in (2.5–7.6 cm) in length, with a slightly smaller width. It is a monoecious species, with each plant producing both male (staminate) and female (pistillate) flowers, which are small.
