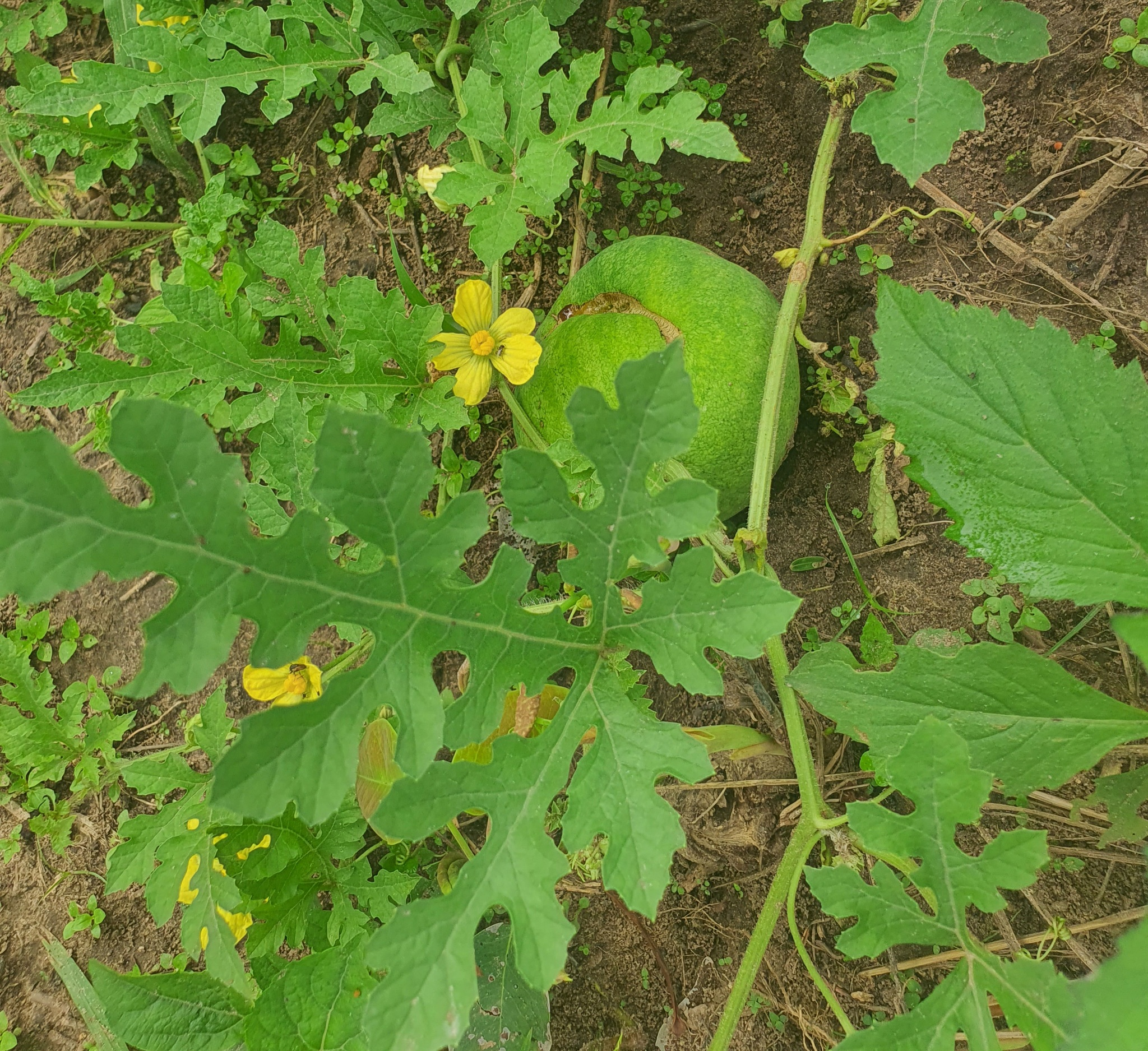

Scientific classification
- Kingdom: Plantae
- Clade: Tracheophytes
- Clade: Angiosperms
- Clade: Eudicots
- Clade: Rosids
- Order: Cucurbitales
- Family: Cucurbitaceae
- Genus: Melothria
- Species: M. sphaerocarpa

Binomial name
- Melothria sphaerocarpa (Cogn.) H.Schaef. & S.S.Renner

Synonyms
- Cladosicyos edulis Hook.f.; Corynosicyos edulis (Hook.f.) F.Muell.; Cucumeropsis edulis (Hook.f.) Cogn.; Cucumeropsis mackennii K.Koch; Cucumeropsis mannii Naudin; Cucurbitella ecuadorensis Cogn.; Momordica procera A.Chev.; Posadaea sphaerocarpa Cogn.

= Melothria sphaerocarpa =

Species of fruit and plant

Melothria sphaerocarpa is a species of melon native from southern Mexico and the Dominican Republic through Central America to tropical South America. It has been introduced to western tropical Africa, where has been known under the synonym Cucumeropsis mannii, and is grown for food and as a source of oil, more often for the seed oil than for the fruit.

Its common names include egusi in Yoruba, 'egwusi in Igbo and agushi in Hausa. Vernacular names for this crop include egusi-itoo. In English it is known as Mann's cucumeropsis and white-seed melon.

== Description ==
Melothria sphaerocarpa produces climbing vines up to 4 meters long which are covered in stiff hairs. The heart-shaped or roughly palmate leaves are up to 12 centimeters long and 14 wide. It bears small yellow male and female flowers with petals under a centimeter in length. The fruit is egg-shaped or an elongated ovate shape, up to about 19 centimeters long and 8 wide, and cream in color with green streaks. The fruit and white seeds are edible.

== Taxonomy ==
Melothria sphaerocarpa is a member of the family Cucurbitaceae. It was first described from West Africa as Cucumeropsis mannii by Charles Victor Naudin in 1866. Later, and independently, a plant was described from South America as Posadaea sphaerocarpa by C. Alfred Cogniaux in 1890. A 2010 study by Hanno Schaefer and Susanne Renner showed that Cucumeropsis mannii from Africa and Posadaea sphaerocarpa from the Americas were extremely similar, differing at most in a small difference in fruit shape, possibly due to human selection. Gene flow between the American and African plants appeared to have ceased "relatively recently". It was suggested that the species may have been taken to Africa as a result of the Atlantic slave trade. The same authors transferred Cucumeropsis mannii-Posadaea sphaerocarpa to the genus Melothria in 2011 since molecular phylogenetic evidence showed that it was nested within that genus. As the name Melothria mannii had already been published, they used the next oldest epithet, sphaerocarpa.

== Distribution ==
Melothria sphaerocarpa is native to southeast Mexico, the Dominican Republic, Central America (Costa Rica, Nicaragua, and Panama) and tropical South America (Colombia, Ecuador, French Guiana, Guatemala, Guyana, north Brazil, Peru, Suriname, Trinidad and Tobago, and Venezuela). It has been introduced to many countries in west tropical Africa (Angola, Benin, Cameroon, the Central African Republic, the Democratic Republic of the Congo, the Republic of the Congo, Equatorial Guinea, Gabon, Guinea-Bissau, the Gulf of Guinea Islands, Ivory Coast, Liberia, Nigeria, Sierra Leone, and Uganda).

== Cultivation ==
This crop is often referred to as "the real egusi" given its long history in West Africa. This crop is primarily harvested for its large white seeds called egusi-itoo. The seeds are commonly processed into soups and oil products, and are also eaten individually as a snack. The crop thrives in harsh climates and high yields are attainable in barren landscapes. Pests and disease are rarely a problem for farmers of this crop. Further benefits include increased soil quality through ground cover and suppression of weeds. This crop also holds significant nutritional value. Oil makes up 44% of the seed, where 30% is protein rich in essential amino acids. The seed is an excellent vegetable protein, and is ideal for battling nutritional debilitations. High in essential vitamins and minerals, egusi-itoo complements the starch and grain diet of most Africans. Despite the crop's obvious advantages, it remains an underutilized tool for nutritional intervention in Africa.

=== Growing conditions ===
The propagation of Melothria sphaerocarpa is entirely by seed. In the transitional zone of West Africa this crop is sown during the major rainy season between March and May. Here the soils are rich in organic matter with a high rainfall of 1,400 mm distributed April–October. Propagation starts after the first couple heavy rainfalls of the season. Holes around 2 cm deep and 1 m apart are planted with 3-4 seeds in each. A complete fertilizer should be applied before the propagation, with periodical application of nitrogenous fertilizer to follow. Growing methods contrast in the northern savannahs where conditions are more challenging with low fertility and organic matter. Rainfall in this zone is small at 800 mm annually. The plant is more successful in this area as a mixed crop, specifically grown in the ridges of sorghum crops. In more challenged areas this crop should be spaced at least 3 m apart, greatly decreasing per-hectare production. After 6–8 months, around September–December the fruit are ready for harvest. The physical signs of ripe fruit include creamy colour and dried stems and leaves. Each plant averages at 2-5 fruits, each weighing 0.8-1.8 kg and containing 90-400 seeds.

=== Stress tolerance ===
This melon can survive in nutrient poor soils in climatically diverse areas. The high degree of ground cover from the plant blankets the soil protecting it from sun exposure and water loss, and therefore increases the quality of the soil. It can thrive in humid, dry and upland areas with little to no consequence on growth or quality of crop. It is drought tolerant, thriving in West Africa's dry regions, adapted to semiarid zones, and is also compatible with warmer tropical highlands.

=== Major weeds, pests and diseases ===
Melothria sphaerocarpa is reported to be pest and disease free. Primary issues include the fungus Macrophomina phaseolina, which attacks the roots and lower stems of the crop causing damping-off disease. The fruit fly species Dacus punctifrons may also attack the fruit of this plant. The fruit generally rots due to the existence of larvae. Halticus tibialis is a flea hopper similar to an aphid and may also cause problems for egusi-itoo crops, often killing the leaves of the plant by sucking out sap. After harvesting, many beetle species including the red flour beetle and the cigarette beetle may feed on seeds which are not properly stored in air-tight containers . M. sphaerocarpa provides ground cover, effectively suppressing weeds. Intercropping with sorghum, cassava, coffee, cotton, maize, or banana crops can reduce weedings during the growing season from 2-3 to just one. This has significant positive effects on the female farmer who spends the majority of her time weeding.

== Consumption and uses ==
Egusi-itoo is primarily grown for the oily seeds it produces. Seeds are commonly ground up and used to thicken soups and stews or as an ingredient in dumplings. Another consumption of egusi-itoo is in patty form after oil has been extracted from the seed, it is then eaten as a protein substitute. Most commonly it is dehulled and consumed as a snack. In Northern Ghana egusi oil is the second most prominent cooking oil. The kernel of the egusi-itoo seed contains semi-drying oils which can be used for making soaps, cooking and for illumination, with the rest of the seed fed to livestock. The flesh of Cucumeropsis mannii is edible but is not commonly consumed due to its bitter taste. In some countries such as Ghana the juice of the fruit is used as healing ointment.

== Further information ==
There is a need for more widespread knowledge on Melothria sphaerocarpa in order to re-popularize the crop and spread its many benefits. NGOs should distribute vital knowledge on crop propagation and handling, and use the crop for nutritional interventions. Importance must be placed on specific harvest timing. Early or late harvesting has a correlation with seed quality. It is important to ensure that the fruit has reached full maturity before harvest in order to secure maximum egusi yields. Full maturity is signified by fully dried plant leaves. Seeds of this fruit should be harvested after 65 days after anthesis. This allows for increased germination ability of stored seeds ensuring productive future yields. It is recommended that farmers select for the seeds with the highest weight for best germination results. In order to achieve the highest possible seed quality it is recommended that harvested fruits be left for 10–20 days to after-ripen. In order to combat pests such as the Dacus punctifrons fields should be rotated yearly, as the fly pupae remain in the soil. Increases in egusi yield and proper storing techniques will help rural subsistence farmers increase food supplies, while allowing for profit gain.

Allergies to egusi are rare but have been reported in the medical literature.

== Nutritional information ==
The kernel of the egusi-itoo seed is 44% oil, 30% protein, 10% carbohydrate, 4% ash and 3% fiber. The oil of this seed is 64.9% linoleic acid, 12.4% oleic acid, 11.8% stearic acid and 10.9% palmitic acid. Vitamins Thiamin, Niacin, B1 and B2 are also prevalent in the seed, as well as many micronutrients. Notable minerals include phosphorus, as the largest mineral component, with potassium, magnesium, manganese, sulfur, calcium, iron and zinc to follow. The bulk of carbohydrates are starch and soluble sugars. Egusi-itoo is the perfect complement to the largely starch-rich grain diet of Africa, providing a high-protein and high-energy concentrate. The seed contains every important macro and micro-nutrient in quantities ideal for nutrition. The amino acid content of egusi-itoo proteins makes it a sufficient vegetable protein. This composition is ideal for sick and growing bodies, providing essential amino acids and calories. Just 100 g of seed daily provides essential fatty acid, amino acid and Vitamin E requirements. There is potential for these seeds as a critical tool for interventions in diseases such as marasmus and kwashiorkor.
