= Halticus intermedius =

Scientific classification
- Domain: Eukaryota
- Kingdom: Animalia
- Phylum: Arthropoda
- Class: Insecta
- Order: Hemiptera
- Suborder: Heteroptera
- Family: Miridae
- Tribe: Halticini
- Genus: Halticus
- Species: H. intermedius

Binomial name
- Halticus intermedius Uhler, 1904

Species of true bug

Halticus intermedius is a species of plant bug in the family Miridae. It is found in North America.
