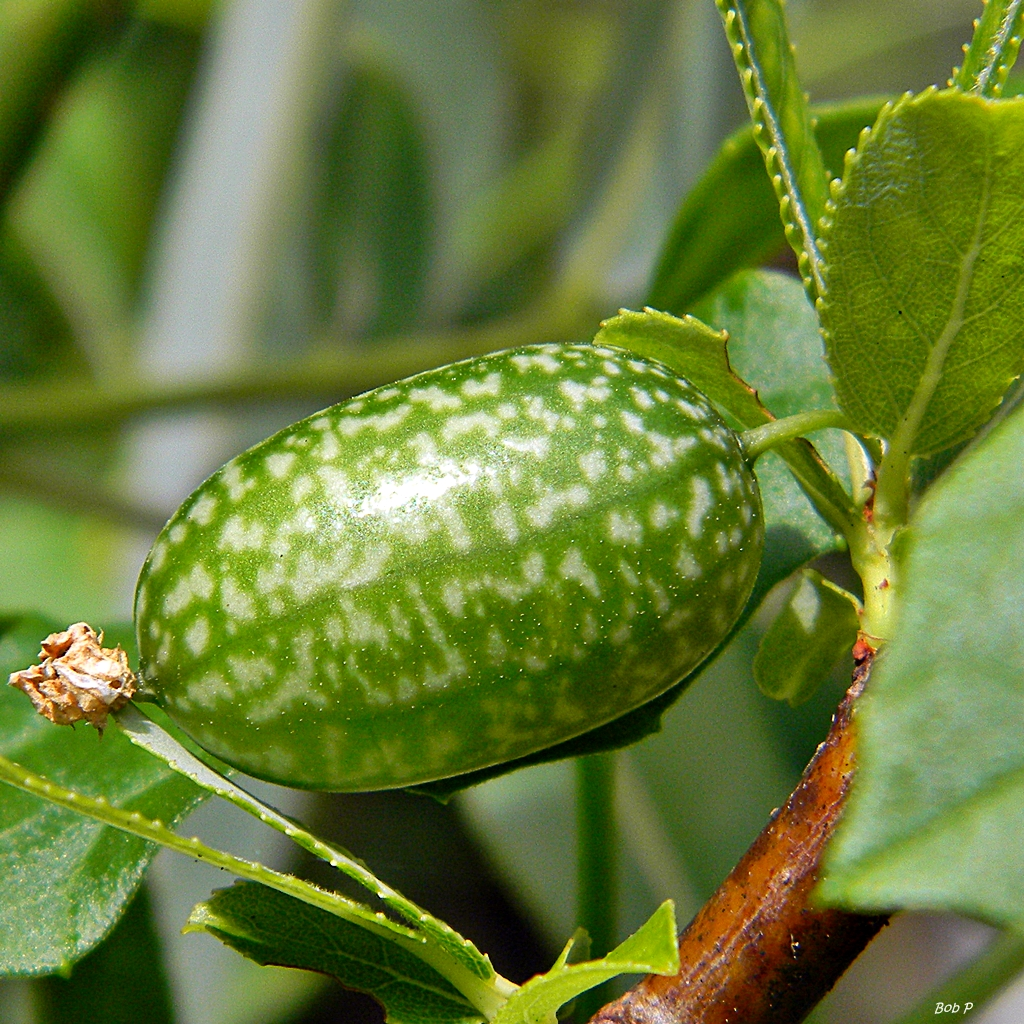
- Melothria pendula (creeping cucumber) fruit

Scientific classification
- Kingdom: Plantae
- Clade: Embryophytes
- Clade: Tracheophytes
- Clade: Spermatophytes
- Clade: Angiosperms
- Clade: Eudicots
- Clade: Rosids
- Order: Cucurbitales
- Family: Cucurbitaceae
- Subfamily: Cucurbitoideae
- Tribe: Benincaseae
- Genus: Melothria; L.

Species
- See text

Synonyms
- List: Cladosicyos Hook.f.; Corynosicyos F.Muell.; Cucumeropsis Naudin; Diclidostigma Kunze; Harlandia Hance; Landersia Macfad.; Melancium Naudin; Posadaea Cogn.

= Melothria =

Genus of Cucurbitaceae plants

Melothria is a genus of flowering plants in the family Cucurbitaceae, native to the Americas from the United States to Argentina, and with some introductions in Africa and elsewhere. A number of Old World species formerly in Melothria were reassigned to Cucumis.

== Species ==
Currently accepted species include:

- Melothria campestris (Naudin) H.Schaef. & S.S.Renner
- Melothria cucumis Vell.
- Melothria dulcis Wunderlin
- Melothria hirsuta Cogn.
- Melothria longituba C.Jeffrey
- Melothria pendula L.
- Melothria pringlei (S.Watson) Mart.Crov.
- Melothria scabra Naudin
- Melothria schulziana Mart.Crov.
- Melothria sphaerocarpa (Cogn.) H.Schaef. & S.S.Renner
- Melothria trilobata Cogn.
- Melothria warmingii Cogn.
