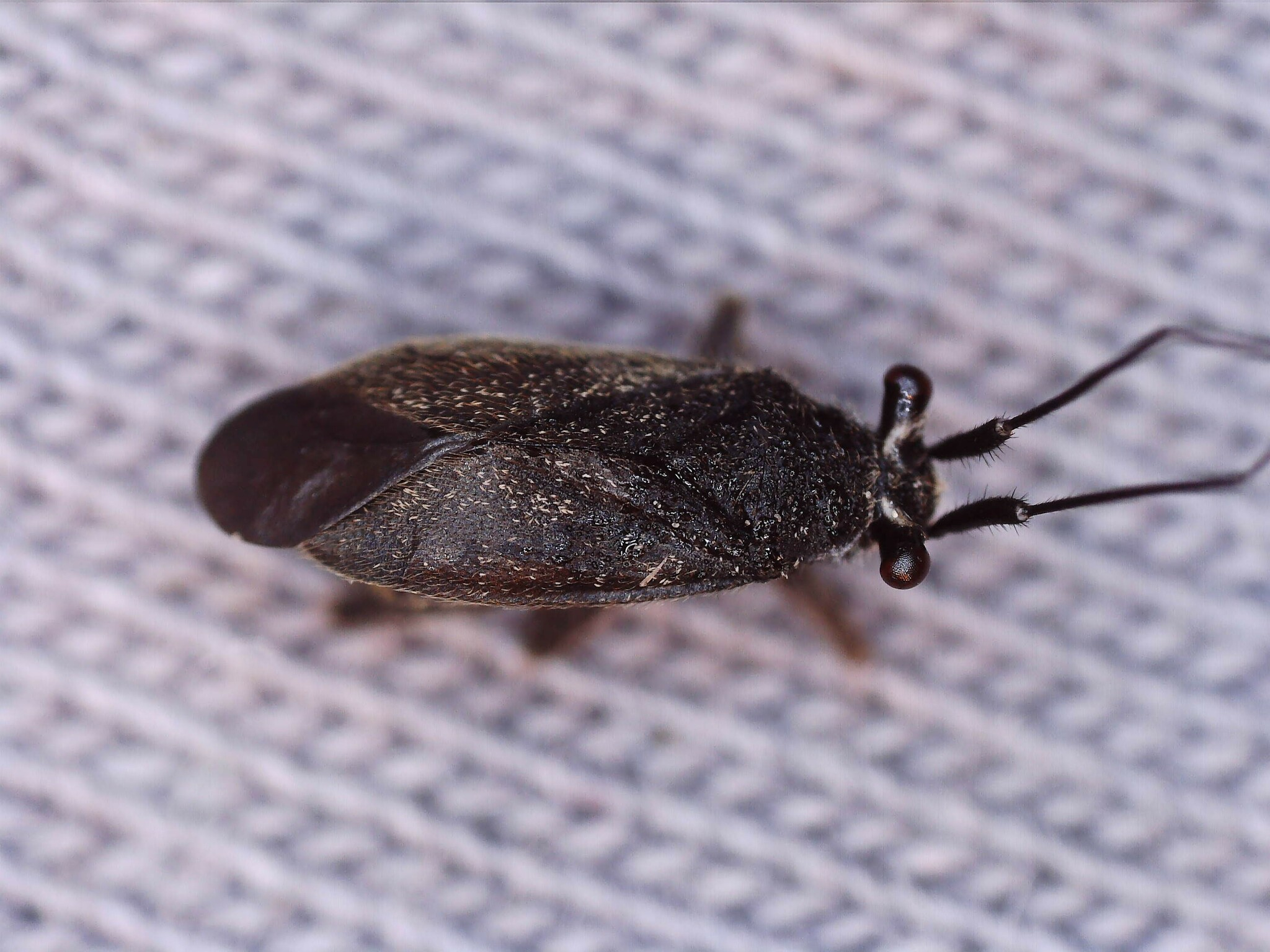
- Photo of Labops sahlbergii

Scientific classification
- Kingdom: Animalia
- Phylum: Arthropoda
- Clade: Pancrustacea
- Class: Insecta
- Order: Hemiptera
- Suborder: Heteroptera
- Family: Miridae
- Tribe: Halticini
- Genus: Labops; Burmeister, 1835

= Labops =

Genus of insects

Labops is a genus of plant bugs in the family Miridae. There are about 13 described species in Labops.

== Species ==
These 13 species belong to the genus Labops:

- Labops bami Kulik, 1979
- Labops brooksi Slater, 1954
- Labops burmeisteri Stal, 1858
- Labops chelifer Slater, 1954
- Labops hesperius Uhler, 1872 (black grass bug)
- Labops hirtus Knight, 1922
- Labops kerzhneri Vinokurov, 2010
- Labops nivchorum Kerzhner, 1988
- Labops sahlbergii (Fallén, 1829)
- Labops setosus Reuter, 1891
- Labops tumidifrons Knight, 1922
- Labops utahensis Slater, 1954
- Labops verae Knight, 1929
