= Labops hesperius =

Scientific classification
- Domain: Eukaryota
- Kingdom: Animalia
- Phylum: Arthropoda
- Class: Insecta
- Order: Hemiptera
- Suborder: Heteroptera
- Family: Miridae
- Genus: Labops
- Species: L. hesperius

Binomial name
- Labops hesperius Uhler, 1872

Species of insect

Labops hesperius, the black grass bug, is a species of plant bug in the family Miridae. It is found in North America.
