= Pachytomella =

Scientific classification
- Kingdom: Animalia
- Phylum: Arthropoda
- Class: Insecta
- Order: Hemiptera
- Suborder: Heteroptera
- Family: Miridae
- Subfamily: Orthotylinae
- Tribe: Halticini
- Genus: Pachytomella; Reuter, 1891

Synonyms
- Pachytoma A. Costa, 1842

Genus of true bugs

Pachytomella is a genus of mostly European capsid bugs in the tribe Halticini, erected by Odo Reuter in 1891. The species Pachytomella parallela is recorded from northern Europe including the British Isles.

== Species ==
According to BioLib the following are included:

1. Pachytomella alutacea (Puton, 1874)
2. Pachytomella cursitans Reuter, 1905
3. Pachytomella doriae (Reuter, 1884)
4. Pachytomella parallela (Meyer-Dür, 1843)
5. Pachytomella passerinii (A. Costa, 1841)
  - type species by subsequent designation: "Pachytoma minor = Phytocoris passerinii A. Costa, 1842"
6. Pachytomella phoenicea (Horváth, 1884)
