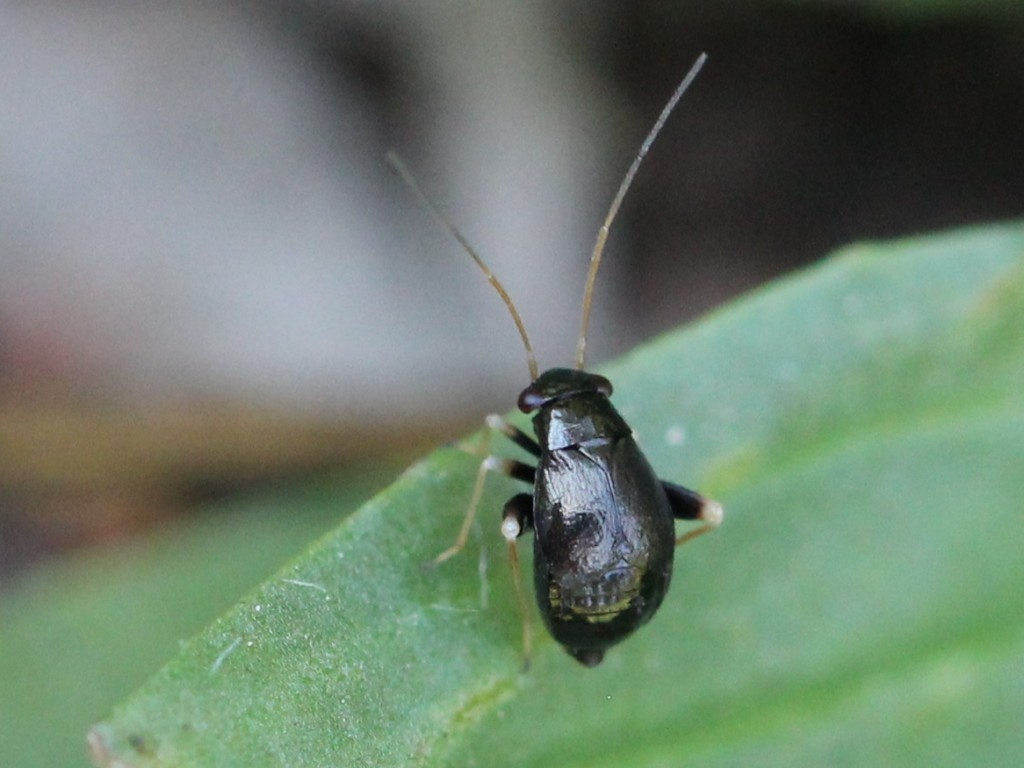

Scientific classification
- Kingdom: Animalia
- Phylum: Arthropoda
- Class: Insecta
- Order: Hemiptera
- Suborder: Heteroptera
- Family: Miridae
- Genus: Halticus
- Species: H. apterus

Binomial name
- Halticus apterus (Linnaeus, 1758)

Synonyms
- Acanthia pallicornis Fabricius, 1794; Halticus pallicornis (Fabricius, 1794)

= Halticus apterus =

Species of true bug

Halticus apterus is a species of plant bug in the family Miridae. It is found in Africa, Europe and Northern Asia (excluding China), and North America. It has a variety of hosts including many Fabaceae and Galium plants.
