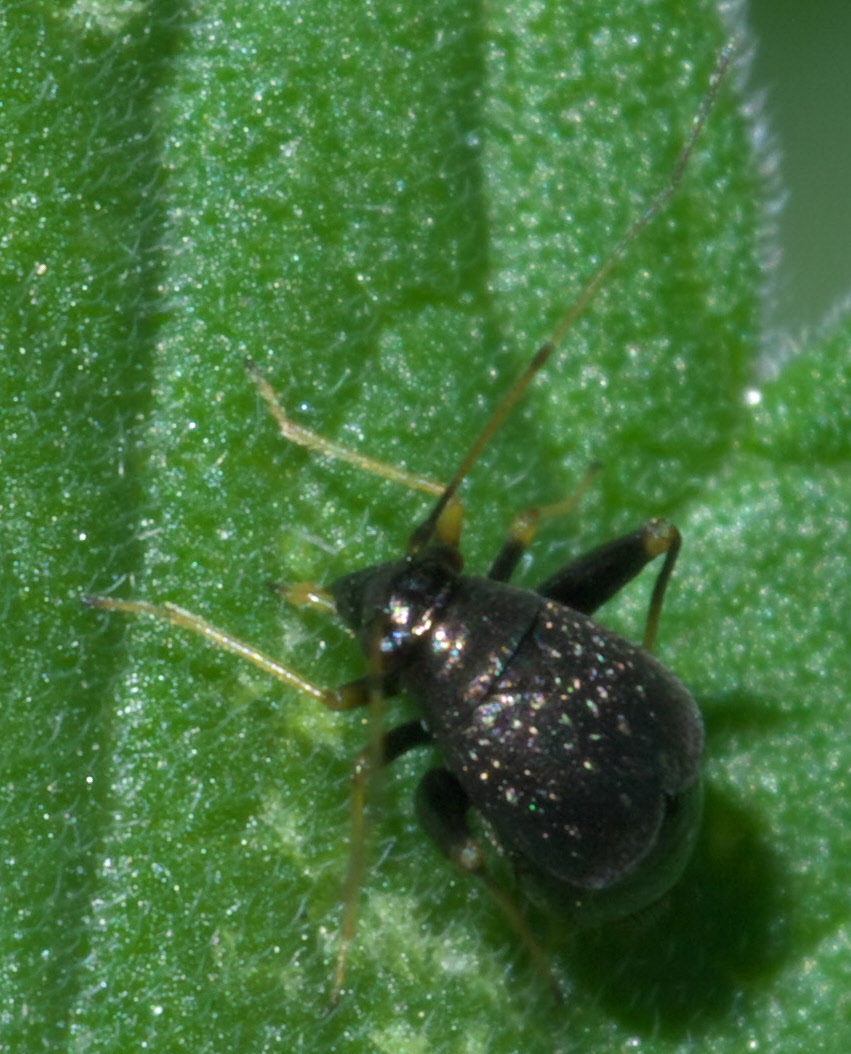
- Microtechnites bractatus

Scientific classification
- Kingdom: Animalia
- Phylum: Arthropoda
- Clade: Pancrustacea
- Class: Insecta
- Order: Hemiptera
- Suborder: Heteroptera
- Family: Miridae
- Tribe: Halticini
- Genus: Microtechnites

= Microtechnites =

Genus of true bugs

Microtechnites is a genus of plant bugs in the family Miridae. There are about six described species in Microtechnites.

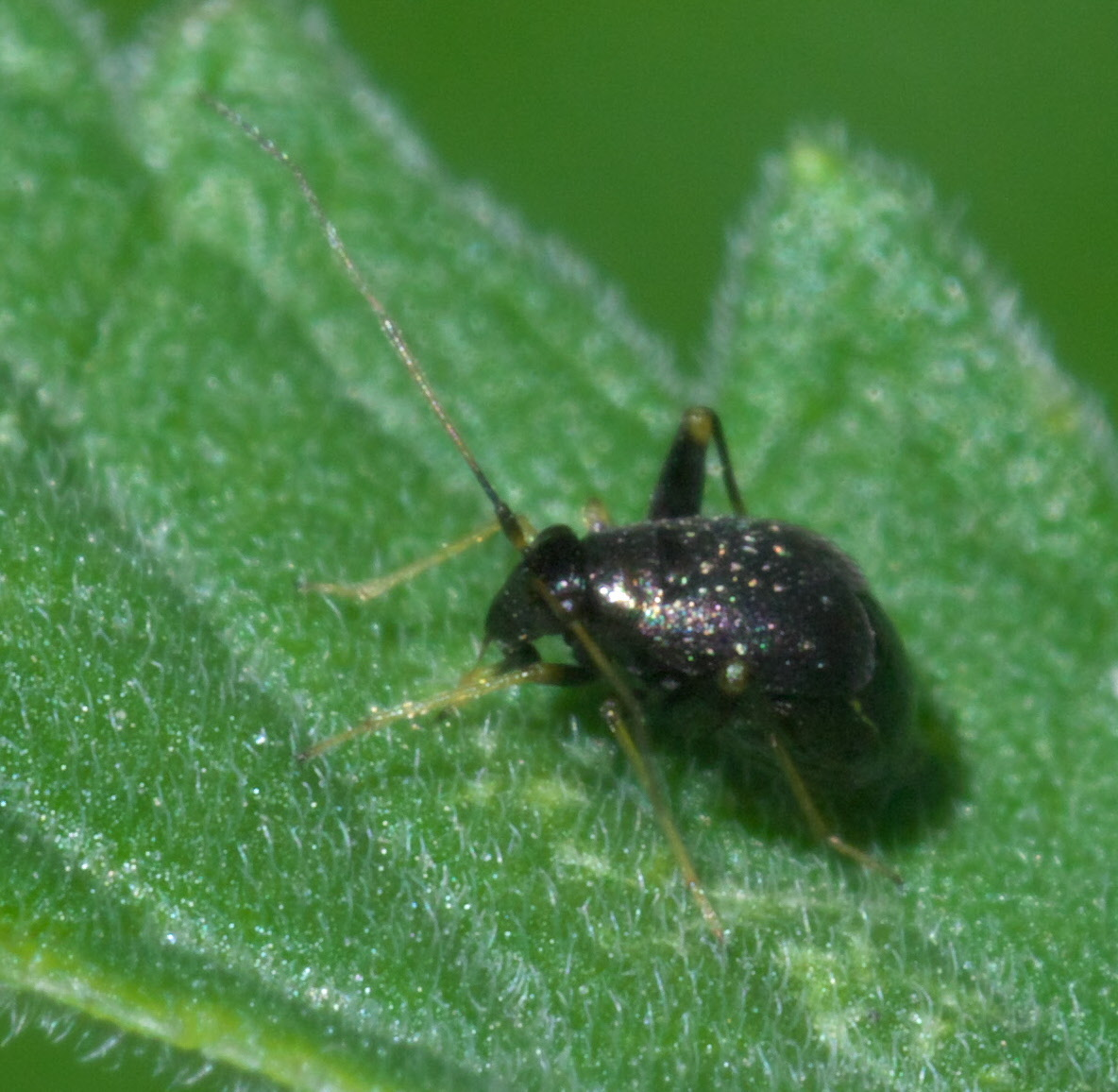
Microtechnites bractatus

== Species ==
These six species belong to the genus Microtechnites:

- Microtechnites altigena (Carvalho and Carpintero, 1986)^{c g}
- Microtechnites bractatus (Say, 1832)^{c g b} (garden fleahopper)
- Microtechnites canus (Distant, 1893)^{c g}
- Microtechnites chrysolepis (Kirkaldy, 1904)^{c g}
- Microtechnites inesalti (Carvalho and Carpintero, 1992)^{c g}
- Microtechnites spegazzinii (Berg, 1883)^{c g}

Data sources: i = ITIS, c = Catalogue of Life, g = GBIF, b = Bugguide.net
