= Labops hirtus =

Scientific classification
- Domain: Eukaryota
- Kingdom: Animalia
- Phylum: Arthropoda
- Class: Insecta
- Order: Hemiptera
- Suborder: Heteroptera
- Family: Miridae
- Genus: Labops
- Species: L. hirtus

Binomial name
- Labops hirtus Knight, 1922

Species of insect

Labops hirtus is a species of plant bug in the family Miridae. It is found in North America.
