= Euryopicoris =

Scientific classification
- Kingdom: Animalia
- Phylum: Arthropoda
- Class: Insecta
- Order: Hemiptera
- Suborder: Heteroptera
- Family: Miridae
- Subfamily: Orthotylinae
- Tribe: Halticini
- Genus: Euryopicoris; Reuter, 1875

Genus of true bugs

Euryopicoris is a genus of true bugs belonging to the family Miridae.

The species of this genus are found in Europe.

Species:

- Euryopicoris fennicus Wagner, 1954
- Euryopicoris nitidus (Meyer-Dur, 1843)
