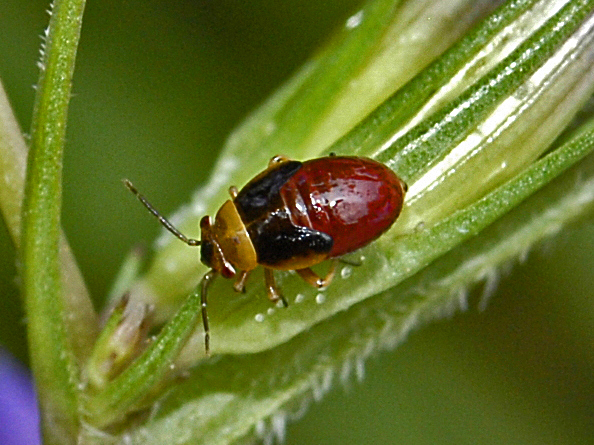
- Nymph of Strongylocoris species

Scientific classification
- Kingdom: Animalia
- Phylum: Arthropoda
- Class: Insecta
- Order: Hemiptera
- Suborder: Heteroptera
- Family: Miridae
- Subfamily: Orthotylinae
- Tribe: Halticini
- Genus: Strongylocoris; Blanchard, 1840

= Strongylocoris =

Genus of true bugs

Strongylocoris is a genus of plant bugs belonging to the family Miridae.

== Species ==
- Strongylocoris atrocoeruleus (Fieber, 1864)
- Strongylocoris cicadifrons A. Costa, 1853
- Strongylocoris erythroleptus A. Costa, 1852
- Strongylocoris franzi Wagner, 1955
- Strongylocoris leucocephalus (Linnaeus, 1758)
- Strongylocoris luridus (Fallén, 1807)
- Strongylocoris niger (Herrich-Schaeffer, 1835)
- Strongylocoris oberthuri Reuter, 1905
- Strongylocoris obscurus (Rambur, 1839)
- Strongylocoris raimondoi Carapezza, 1991
- Strongylocoris seabrai Schmidt, 1939
- Strongylocoris steganoides (J. Sahlberg, 1875)
