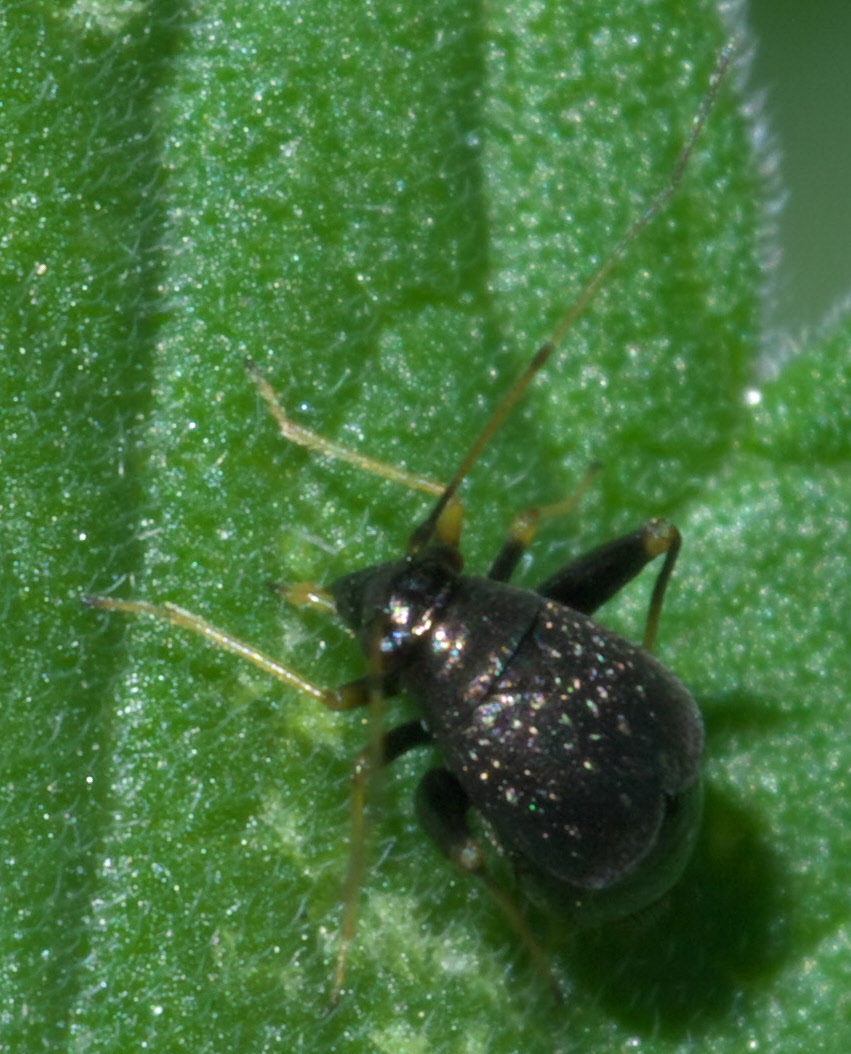

Scientific classification
- Kingdom: Animalia
- Phylum: Arthropoda
- Clade: Pancrustacea
- Class: Insecta
- Order: Hemiptera
- Suborder: Heteroptera
- Family: Miridae
- Genus: Microtechnites
- Species: M. bractatus

Binomial name
- Microtechnites bractatus (Say, 1832)

= Microtechnites bractatus =

Species of true bug

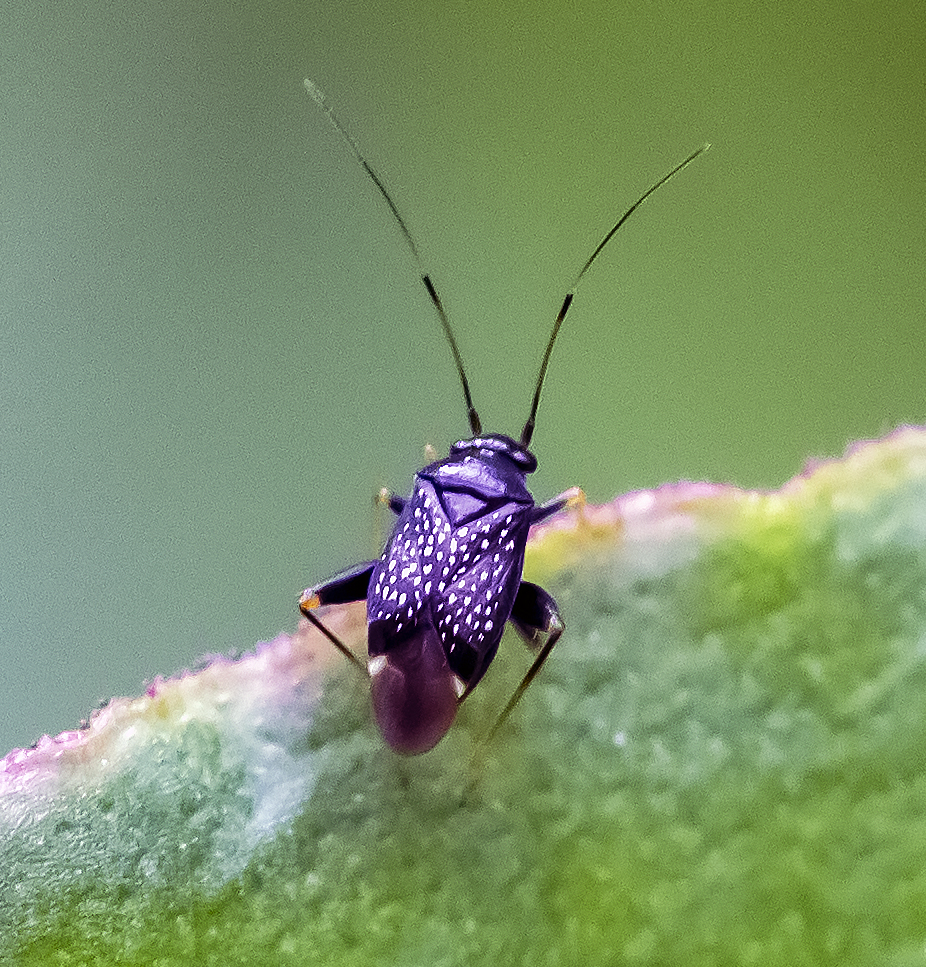
Garden Fleahopper (Microtechnites bractatus)

Microtechnites bractatus, the garden fleahopper, is a species of plant bug in the family Miridae.

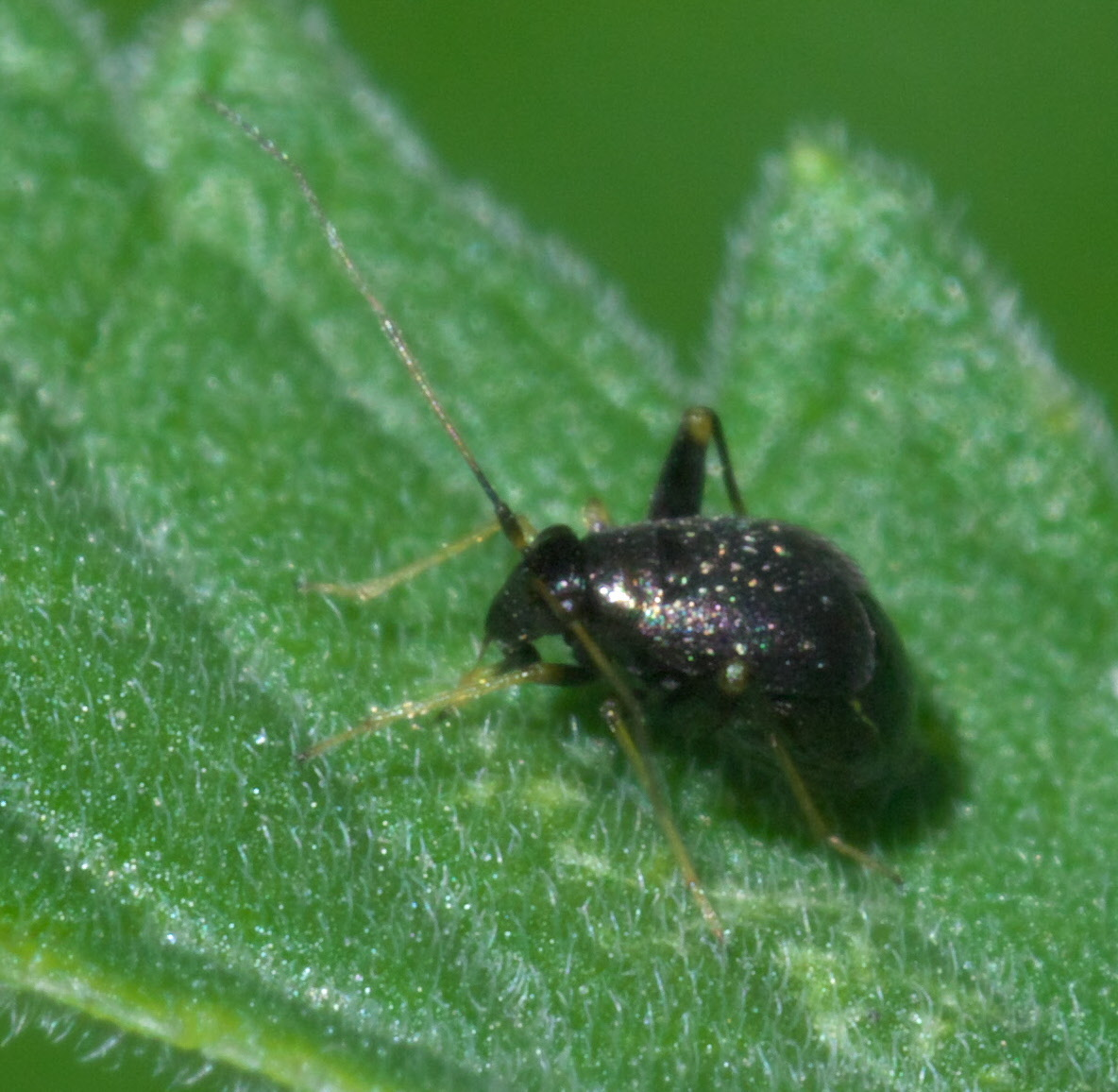
Garden fleahopper, Microtechnites bractatus
