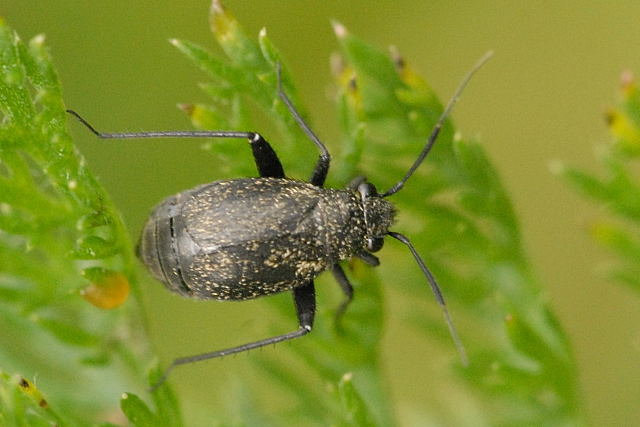

Scientific classification
- Kingdom: Animalia
- Phylum: Arthropoda
- Class: Insecta
- Order: Hemiptera
- Suborder: Heteroptera
- Family: Miridae
- Genus: Orthocephalus
- Species: O. coriaceus

Binomial name
- Orthocephalus coriaceus (Fabricius, 1777)

= Orthocephalus coriaceus =

Species of true bug

Orthocephalus coriaceus is a species of plant bug in the family Miridae. It is found in Europe including European Russia, Ukraine and the Balkans and North America.

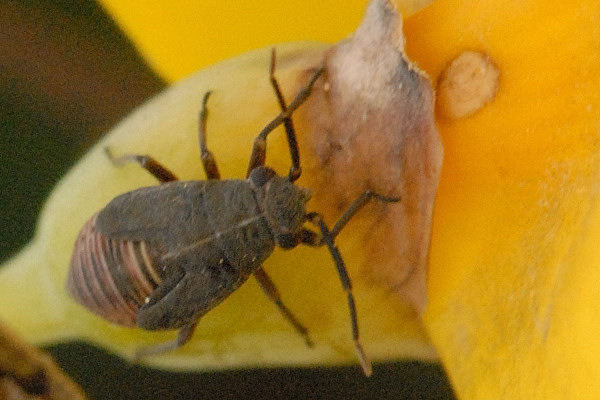

Orthocephalus coriaceus lives on various daisy family plants (Asteraceae) such as Leucanthemum, Tanacetum, Hieracium , Achillea, Centaurea, Artemisia . The bugs suck both on the leaves and stems, as well as on the reproductive organs of the plants. In North America it appears as a horticultural pest introduced from Europe.
