= Apodanthera mandonii =

Scientific classification
- Kingdom: Plantae
- Clade: Tracheophytes
- Clade: Angiosperms
- Clade: Eudicots
- Clade: Rosids
- Order: Cucurbitales
- Family: Cucurbitaceae
- Genus: Apodanthera
- Species: A. mandonii

Binomial name
- Apodanthera mandonii Cogn. (1876)

Synonyms
- Apodanthera herrerae Harms (1933); Apodanthera mandonii var. canescens Cogn. (1876); Apodanthera mandonii var. dissecta Cogn. (1876); Apodanthera moqueguana Mart.Crov. (1956)

Species of flowering plant

Apodanthera mandonii, known as ckoto-ckoto, is grown for its edible tuber. It is native to the Andes, ranging from Ecuador (Chimborazo Province) to Peru and Bolivia.
