= Egusi =

Type of seed commonly found in West African cuisine

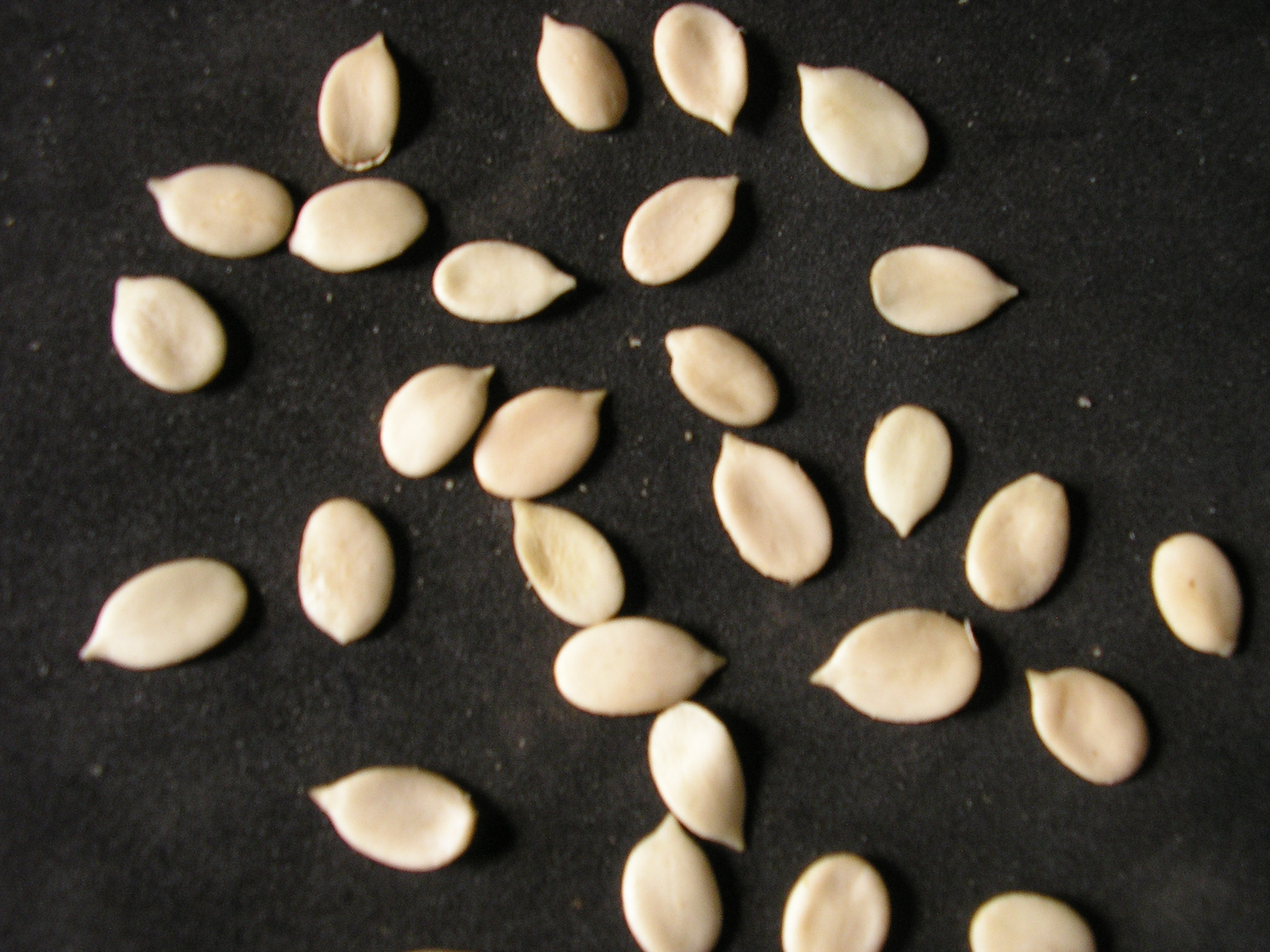
Egusi seeds without shells

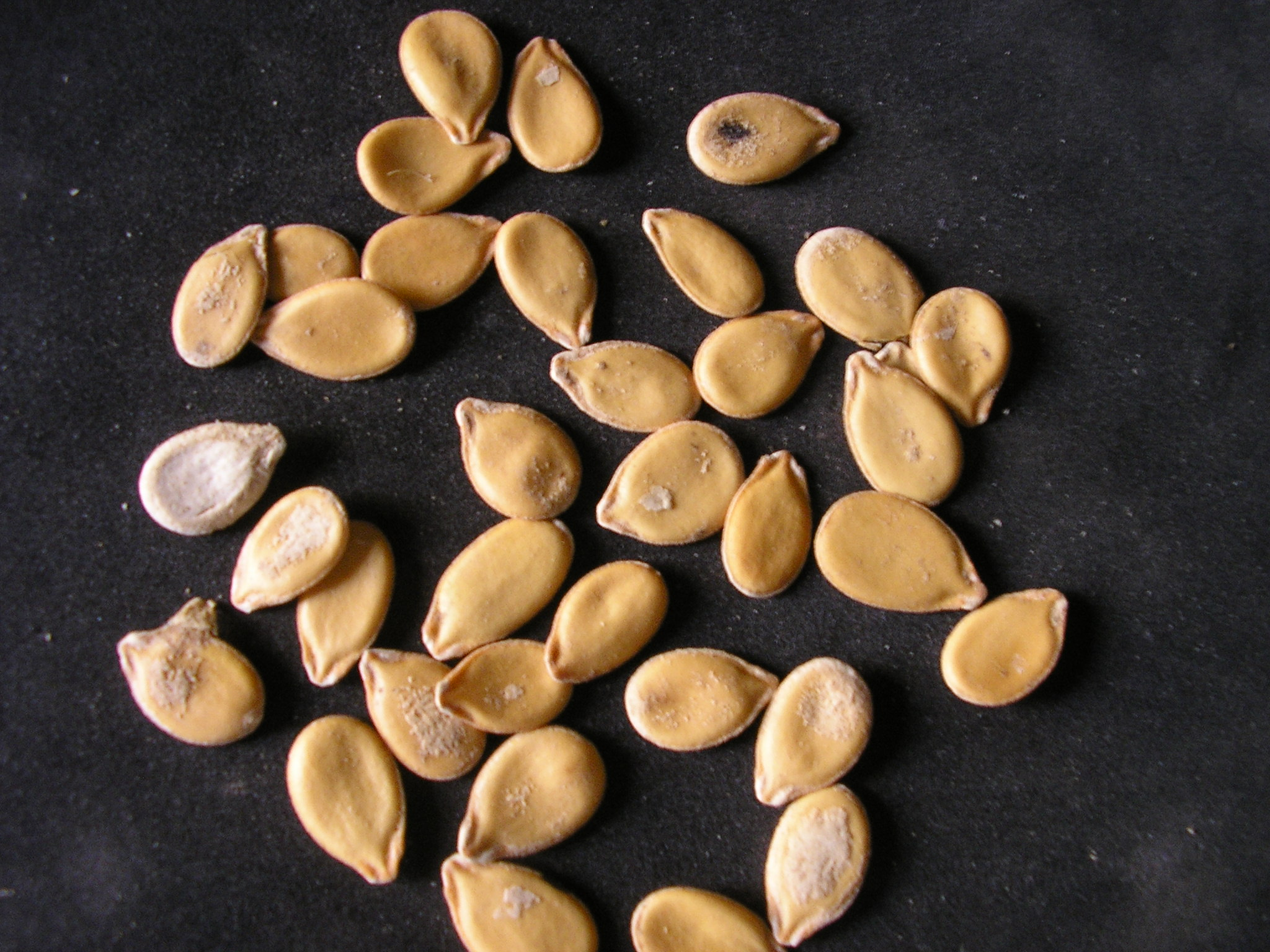
Egusi seeds with shells

Egusi, also spelled egushi (Yoruba: Ẹ̀gúṣí), are the protein-rich seeds of certain cucurbitaceous plants (squash, melon, gourd), which, after being dried and ground, are used as a major ingredient in West African cuisine.

Egusi melon seeds are large and white in appearance; sometimes they look brownish or off-white in color but the main egusi color is primarily white.

Scholars disagree whether the word is used more properly for the seeds of the colocynth, those of a particular large-seeded variety of the watermelon, or generically for those of any cucurbitaceous plant. Egusi seeds are in a class of their own and should never be mistaken for pumpkin or watermelon seeds. In particular the name "egusi" may refer to either or both plants (or more generically to other cucurbits) in their capacity as seed crops, or to a soup made from these seeds and popular in West Africa.

The characteristics and uses of all these seeds are broadly similar. Major egusi-growing nations include Nigeria, Burkina Faso, Togo, Ghana, Côte d'Ivoire, Benin, Mali, and Cameroon.

Species from which egusi is derived include Melothria sphaerocarpa (syn. Cucumeropsis mannii) and Citrullus lanatus.

== Use ==
=== Soups and stews ===
Egusi seeds are used in making egusi soup; the soup is thickened with the seeds. Melothria sphaerocarpa, which egusi seeds are from, grows throughout central to western Africa and is used by different ethnic groups in these regions to prepare the soup. Egusi soup is a very popular soup in West Africa, with considerable local variations. Besides the seeds, water, and oil, egusi soup typically contains leafy greens, other vegetables, seasonings, and meat. Leafy greens typically used for egusi soup include Efo Tete, scent leaf, okazi/afang (wild spinach), bitterleaf (onugbu), pumpkin leaf (ugu), uziza leaf, celosia and spinach. Other commonly used vegetables include tomatoes, okra and bell peppers. Typical seasonings include chili peppers, onions, salt and locust beans. Also commonly used ingredients are beef, goat, chicken, fish, periwinkle, shrimp or crayfish as sources of protein.

In Nigeria, egusi is common throughout the country, and the seeds are used in making stews and soups. The Igbo refer to it as "egwusi," a borrowed term from the original Yoruba word "egusi."

In Ghana, egusi is also called akatoa, egushi or agushi, and is used for soup and stew, most popularly in palaver sauce.

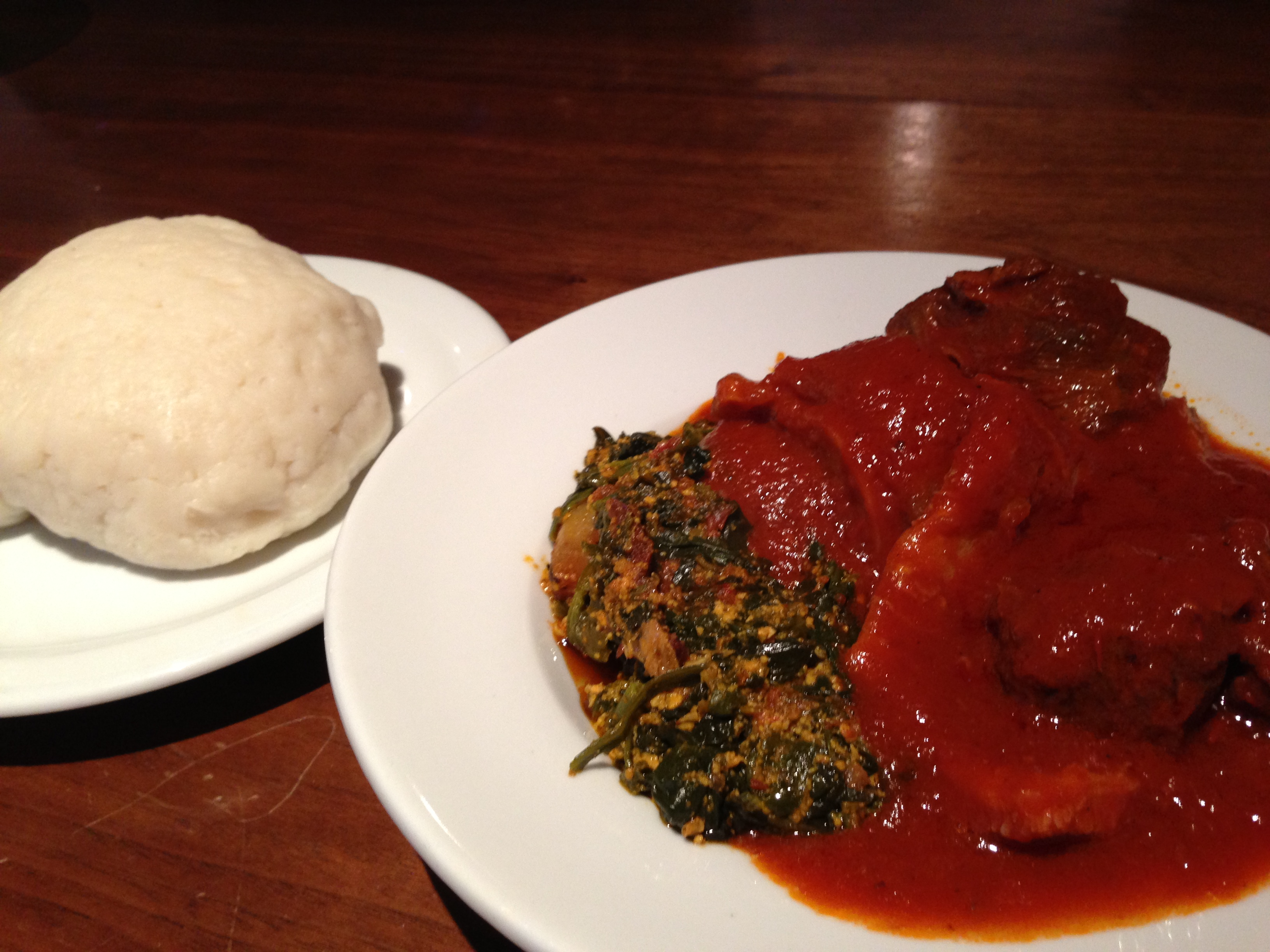
A plate of pounded yam and egusi soup

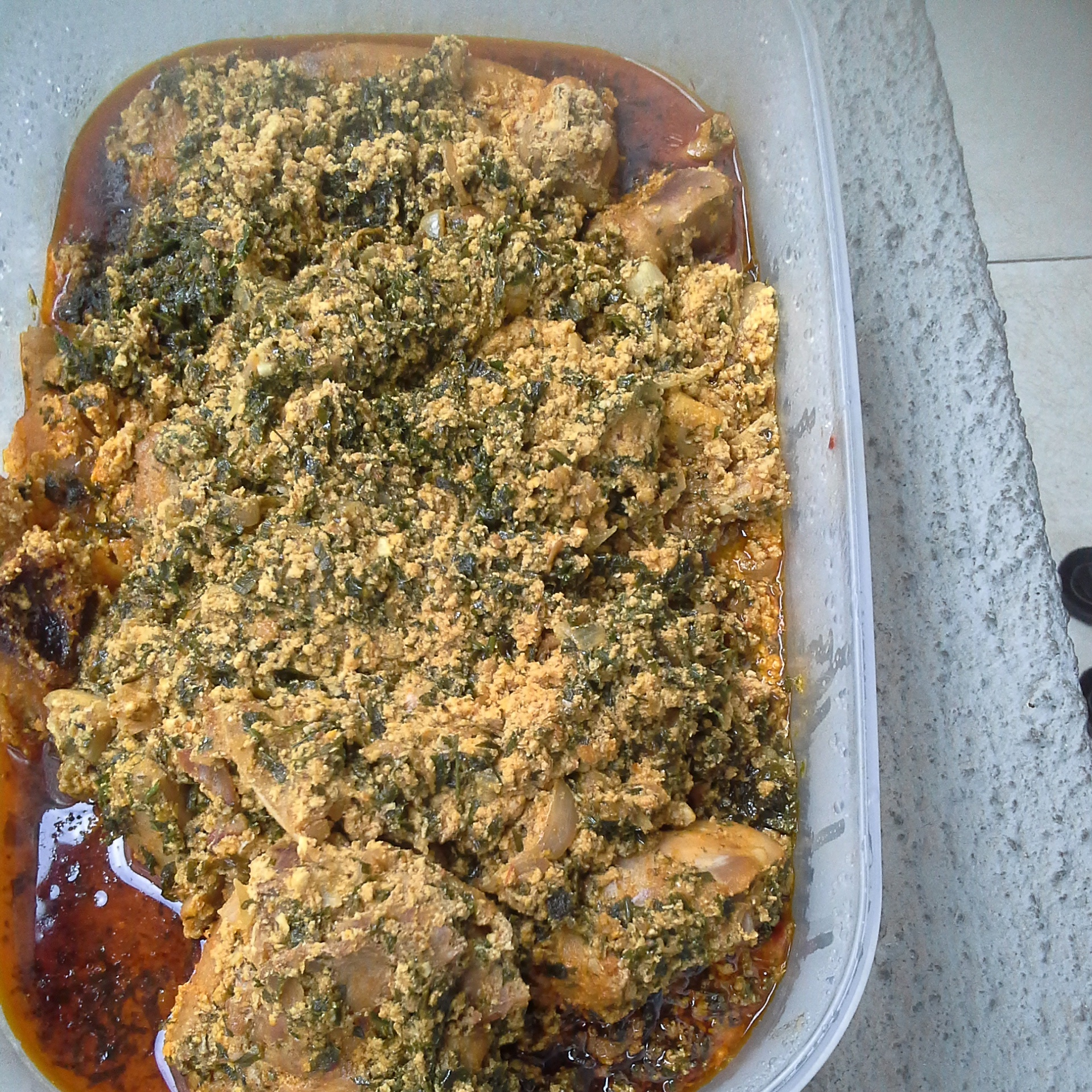
Egusi and bitter leaf soup

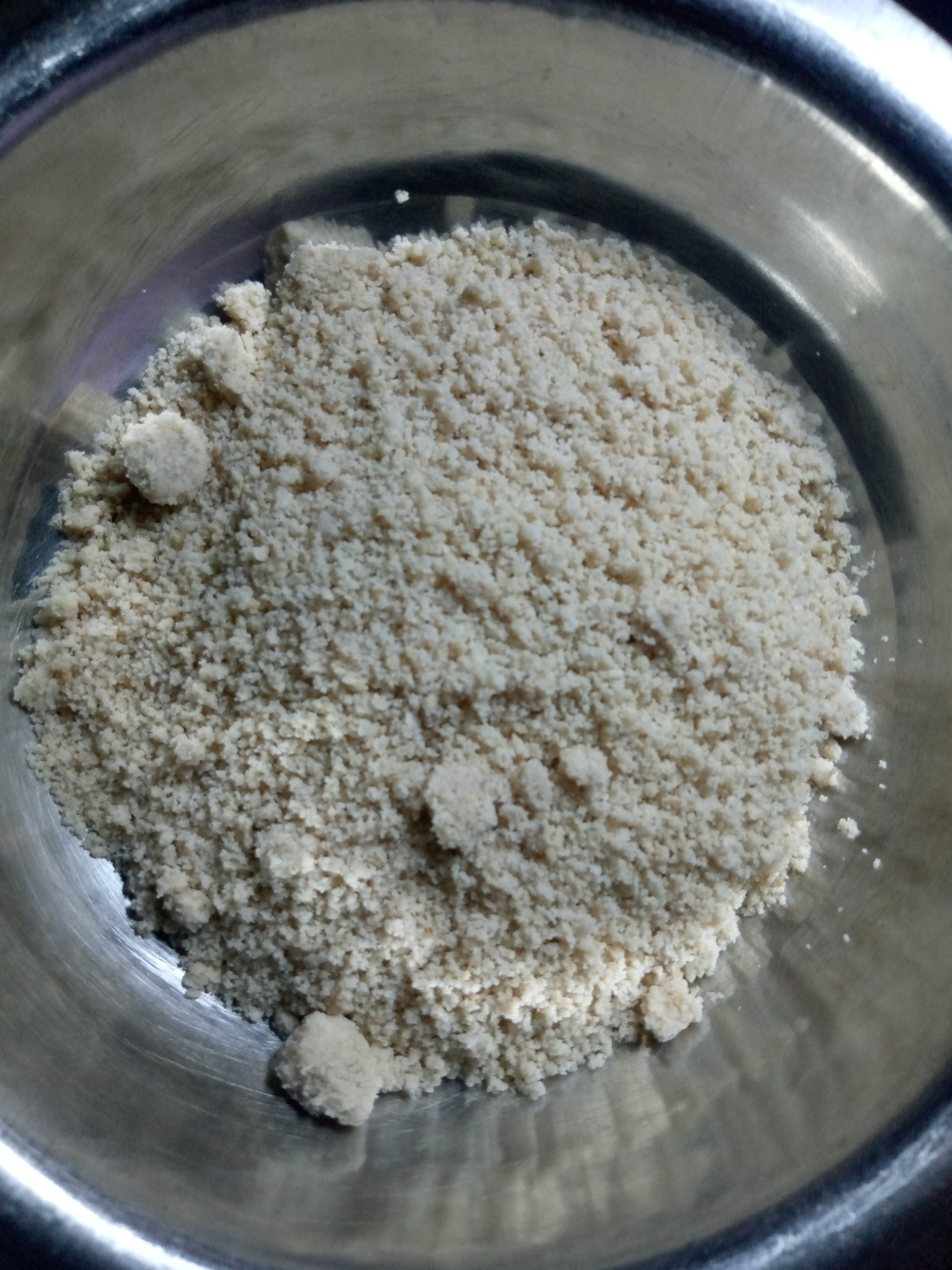
Egusi powder with powdered lemon

=== Seed oil ===
Egusi seed oil contains linoleic acid (53%) and oleic acid (19%).

=== Processing ===
In the late 1980s, the Government of Canada funded a project intended to develop a machine to help Cameroonians shell egusi seeds. A machine has also been developed in Nigeria to shell egusi.

Production of melonseed

Melonseed yield

== Terminology ==
The 'ẹ' means 'to', 'gun' means 'pound' or 'grind', and 'ṣi' means 'to open'; this etymology of 'egusi' soup, meaning 'to grind open', reflects the procedure used in its preparation.

Egusi stew is now widely eaten across large portions of West and Central Africa where it is known by various local names, many of which are variants of the word egusi itself. Some of the other names egusi goes by across the region include:

- Yoruba : Egusi / Egushi (Ẹ̀gúṣí)
- Hausa : Agusi, Agushi (via Yoruba)
- Twi : Akatowa
- Ga : Agushi, Egushi
- Igbo : Élìlì, Énìnì, Ekeke, Ahụ, Élìlè, Ilolo, Iroro, Éyìyè, Ogili, Nwanru, Ègwúsí (Onitsha Igbo; via Yoruba)
- Edo : Ogi, Ikpogi
- Ibibio, Efik : Íkpán, Ikon
- Fon : Gúsí
- Nupe : Epín, Epíngi, Paragi
- Urhobo : Ikpogri
- Tiv : Icegher
- Kikongo, Lingala : Mbika

== See also ==
- Egusi sauce
- Yoruba cuisine
- List of African dishes
- List of melon dishes and foods
- List of stews
- Pumpkin seeds
- Watermelon seed oil
