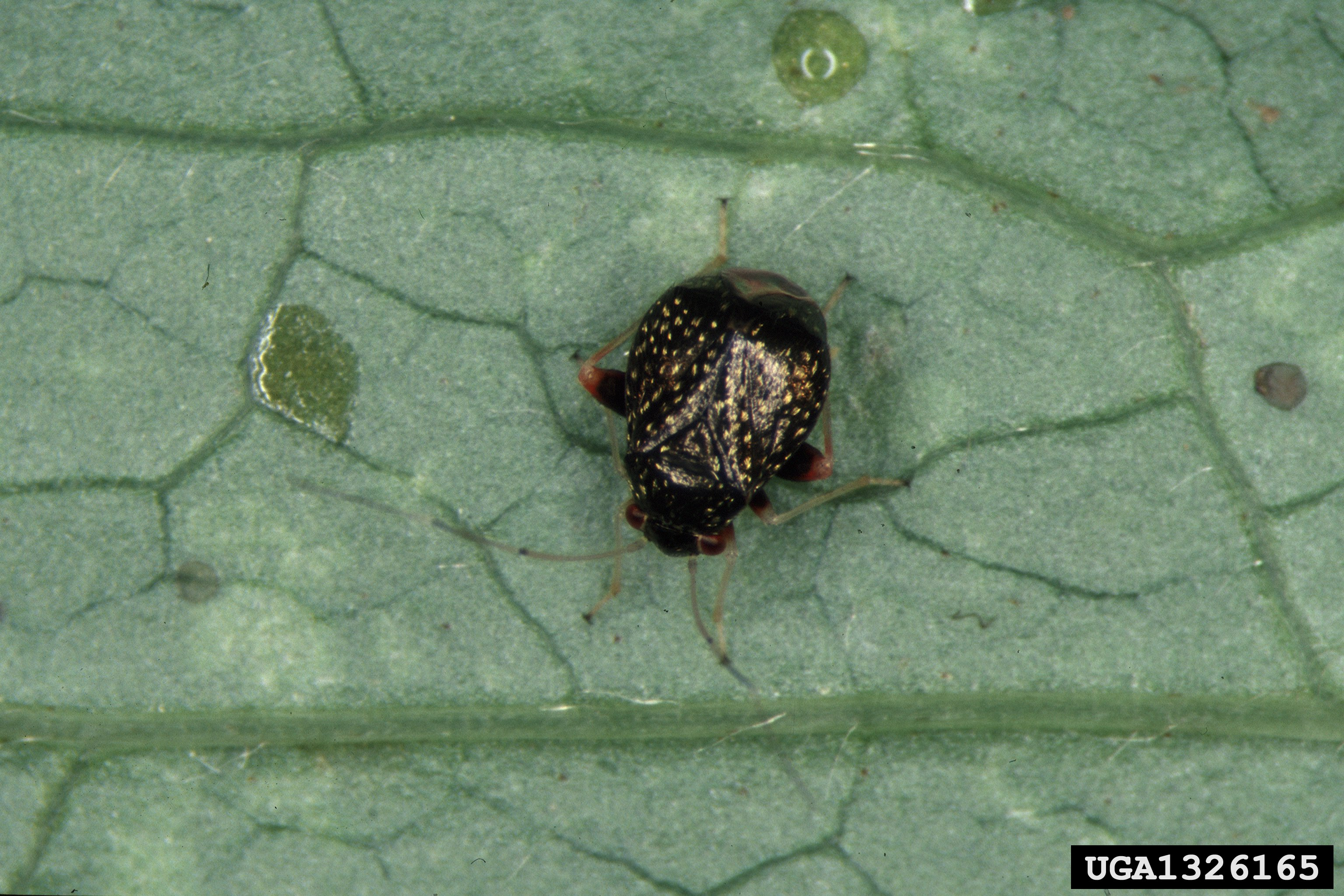
- Halticus

Scientific classification
- Kingdom: Animalia
- Phylum: Arthropoda
- Class: Insecta
- Order: Hemiptera
- Suborder: Heteroptera
- Family: Miridae
- Subfamily: Orthotylinae
- Tribe: Halticini; Costa, 1853

= Halticini =

Tribe of true bugs

Halticini is a tribe of plant bugs in the family Miridae.

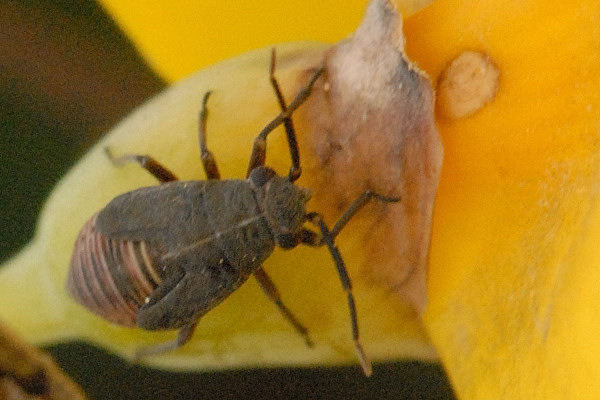
Orthocephalus coriaceus

== Genera ==
BioLib includes the following:

1. Acratheus Distant, 1910
2. Anapomella V.G. Putshkov, 1961
3. Anapus Stål, 1858^{i c g b}
4. Barbarosia Kiyak, 1995
5. Chorosomella Horváth, 1906
6. Coridromius Signoret, 1862^{i c g b}
7. Dampierella Tatarnic, 2009
8. Dasyscytus Fieber, 1864
9. Dimorphocoris Reuter, 1891
10. Ectmetopterus Reuter, 1906
11. Euryopicoris Reuter, 1875
12. Goodeniaphila Tatarnic, 2009
13. Halticus Hahn, 1832^{i c g b} (fleahoppers)
14. Labopella Knight, 1929^{i c g b}
15. Labops Burmeister, 1835^{i c g b}
16. Microtechnites^{c g b}
17. Myrmecophyes Fieber, 1870^{i c g}
18. Namaquacapsus Schuh, 1974
19. Nanniella Reuter, 1904
20. Nesidiorchestes Kirkaldy, 1902^{i c g}
21. Orthocephalus Fieber, 1858^{i c g b}
22. Pachytomella Reuter, 1891
23. Piezocranum Horváth, 1877
24. Plagiotylus Scott, 1874
25. Platyporus Reuter, 1890
26. Schoenocoris Reuter, 1891
27. Scirtetellus Reuter, 1890
28. Strongylocoris Blanchard, 1840

Data sources: i = ITIS, c = Catalogue of Life, g = GBIF, b = Bugguide.net
