= Egusi sauce =

African sauce

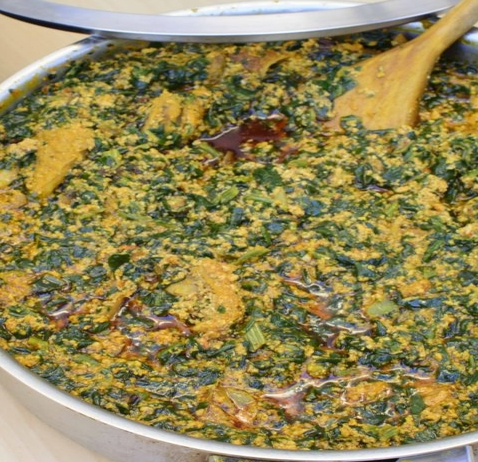
- Egusi Soup
- Type: Soup
- Place of origin: West Africa
- Region or state: Nigeria
- Serving temperature: Warm
- Main ingredients: Egusi
- Ingredients generally used: Ugu leaf; Bitter Leaf; Spinach

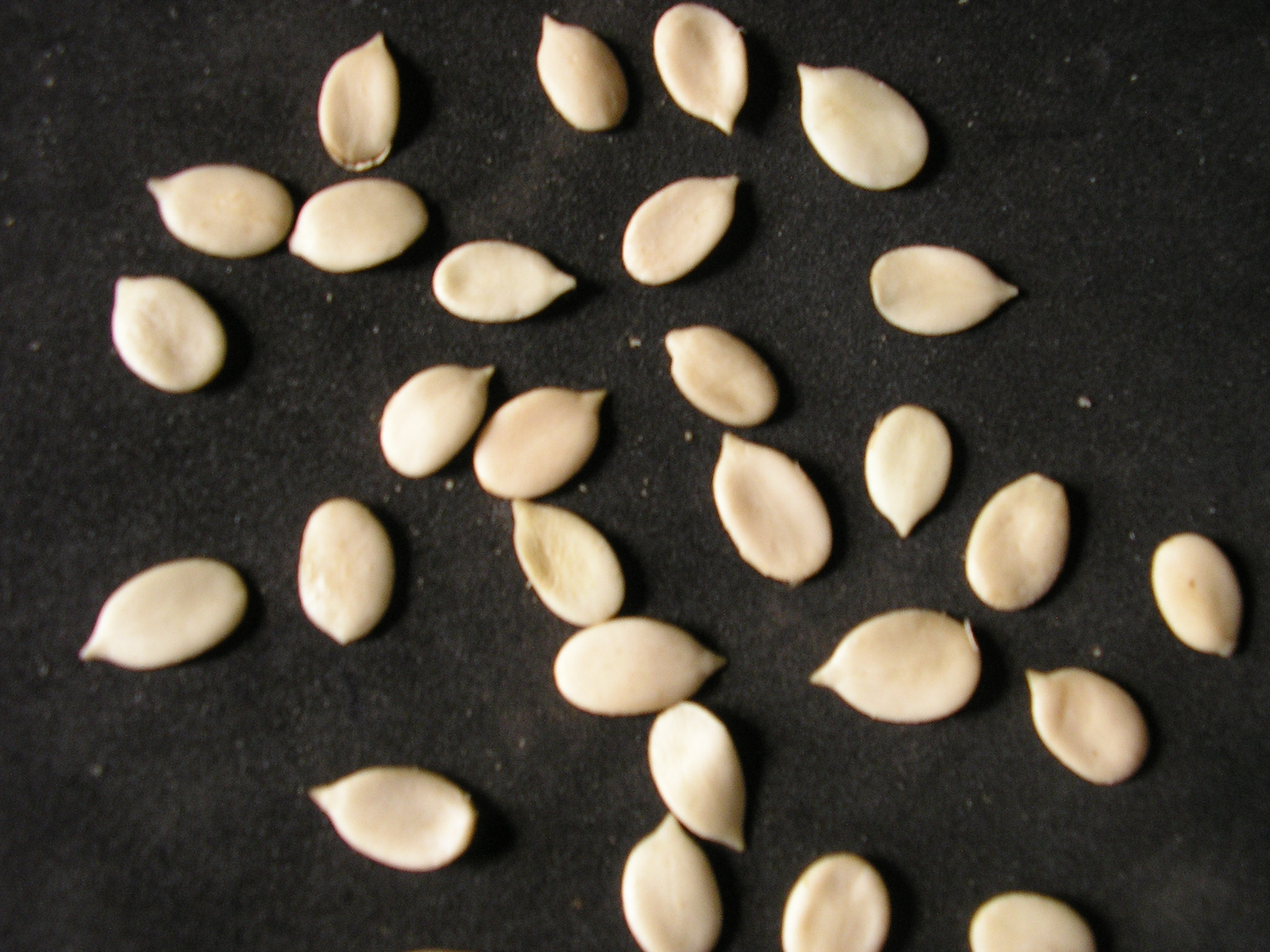
Egusi seeds without shells

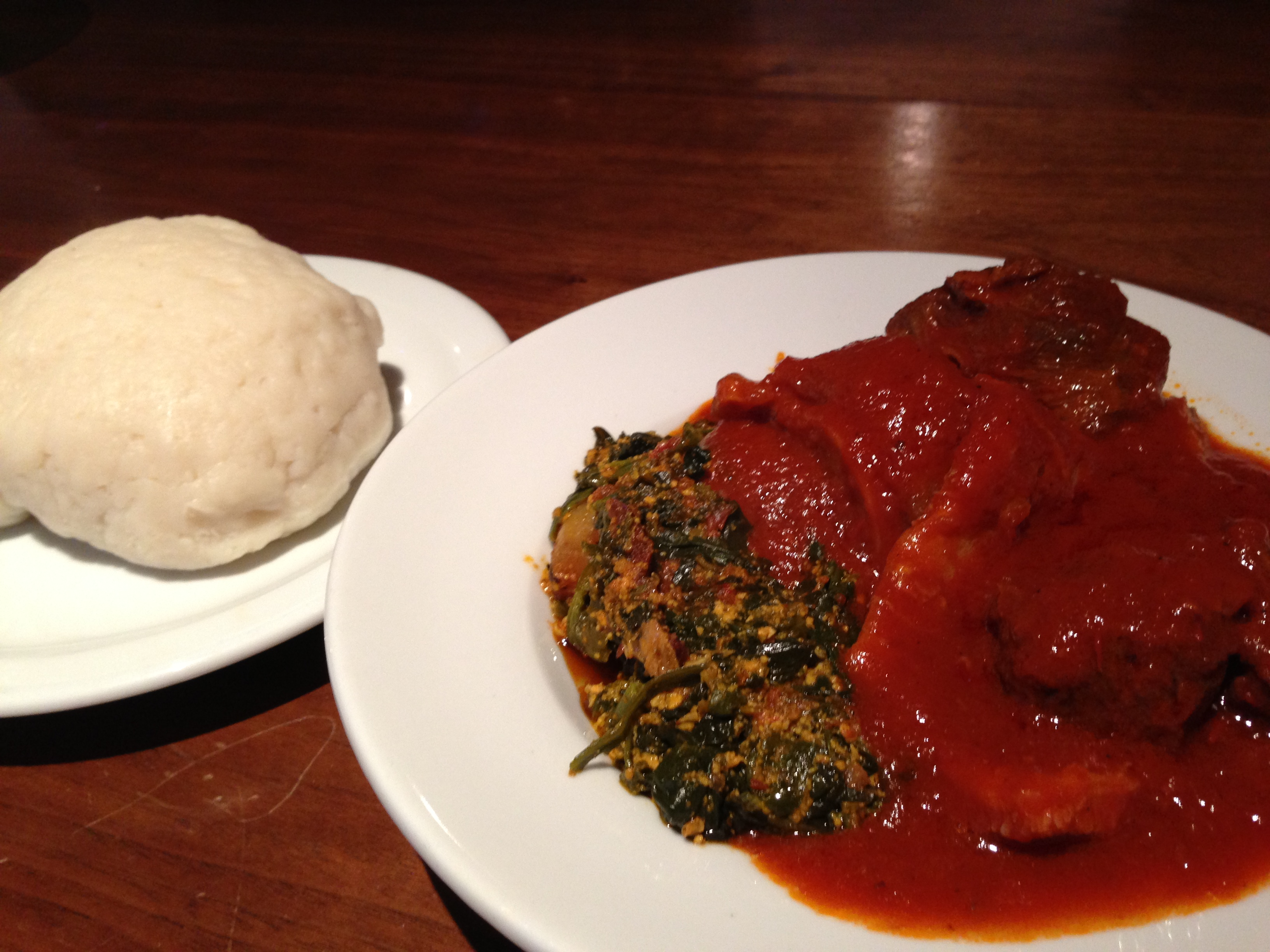
Egusi soup atop a dish, with pounded yam (upper left)

Egusi sauce or egusi soup is a popular soup in Nigeria. The word 'Egusi' is of Yoruba origin. It is prepared with egusi seeds as a primary ingredient. Egusi seeds are the fat- and protein-rich seeds of certain cucurbitaceous (squash, melon, gourd) plants. Egusi sauce is common and prevalent across Central Africa as mbíka, and may be served atop rice, cooked vegetables, or grilled meat, such as goat, chicken, beef, or fish. It may also be served atop fufu, omelettes, amala, and eba, among other foods. Egusi soup is also consumed in West Africa, sometimes with chicken.

== Preparation ==
Egusi sauce is prepared by grinding egusi seeds, from which a paste is created. There are two methods of preparing egusi soup:

1. Frying method: Egusi paste is fried in palm oil before adding other ingredients and sometime you can add a little salt to it before frying.

2. Boiling method: Small lumps of egusi paste are added to boiling water and broken into pieces after cooking for 10 minutes.

Soup ingredients may include tomato, onion, chili pepper, and cooking oil, such as palm oil. Sometimes pumpkin seeds are substituted in place of egusi seeds.

When using bitter leaf to prepare Egusi soup, it is important to wash it thoroughly to reduce the bitter taste before adding it to the soup.

== Similar dishes ==
Egusi soup is a kind of soup thickened with the ground seeds and popular in West Africa, with considerable local variation. Besides the seeds, water, and oil, egusi soup typically contains leaf vegetables and other vegetables, seasonings, and meat.

== Health benefits ==
Egusi contains anti-inflammatory properties and compounds that have been used to help manage inflammation. It may also help reduce the effects of inflammation in the body. The seed is high in nutrients, supports weight management, promotes good health, and may help reduce blood sugar levels.

It is also a good source of plant-based protein, making it a valuable addition to a balanced diet, especially for vegetarians and vegans.

== Countries ==
Egusi is also prepared in several West and Central African countries outside Nigeria as a cultural delicacy, including Ghana, Cameroon, Togo, Benin, and Sierra Leone.

== See also ==
- List of soups
