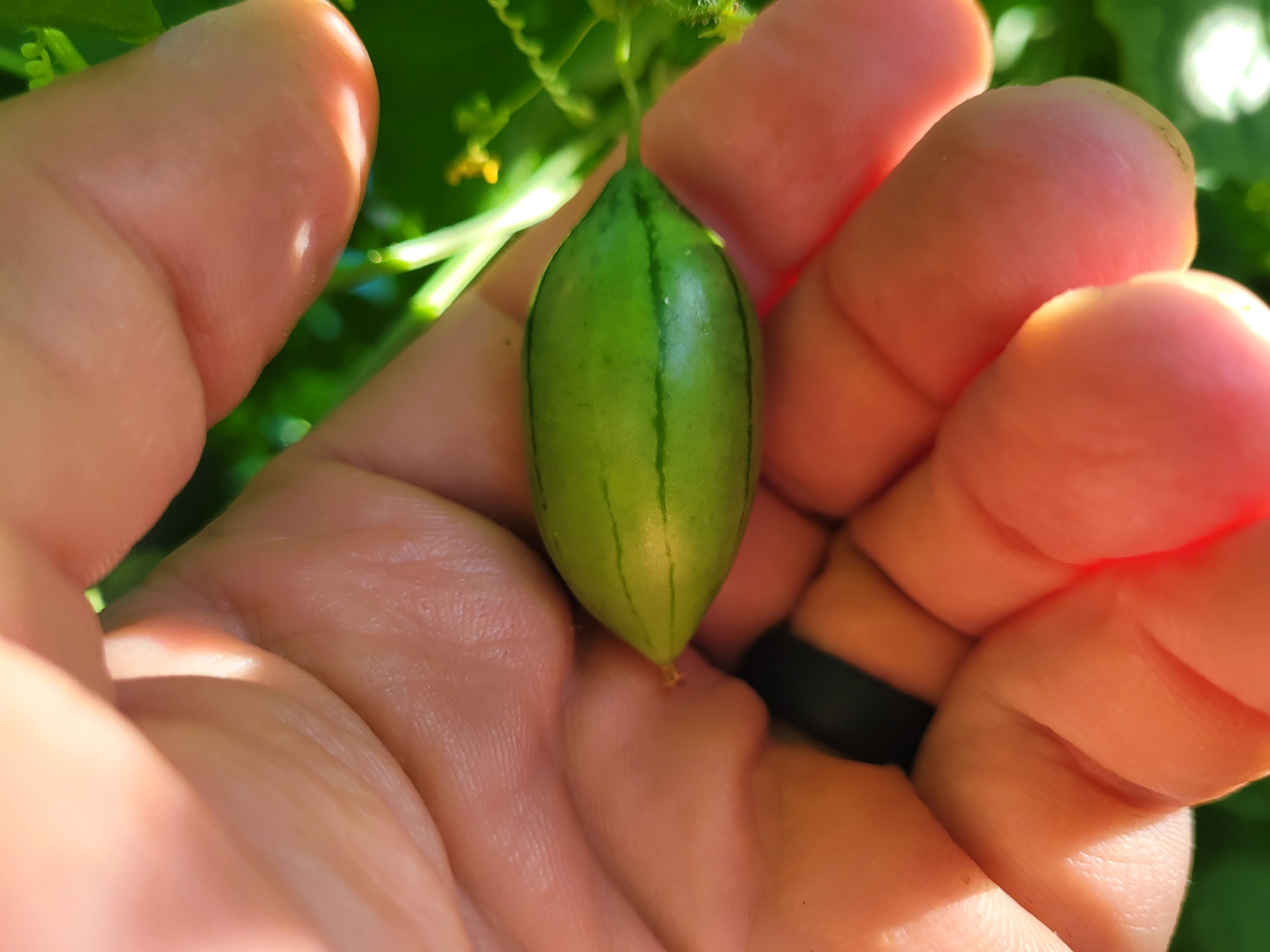
- Fruit
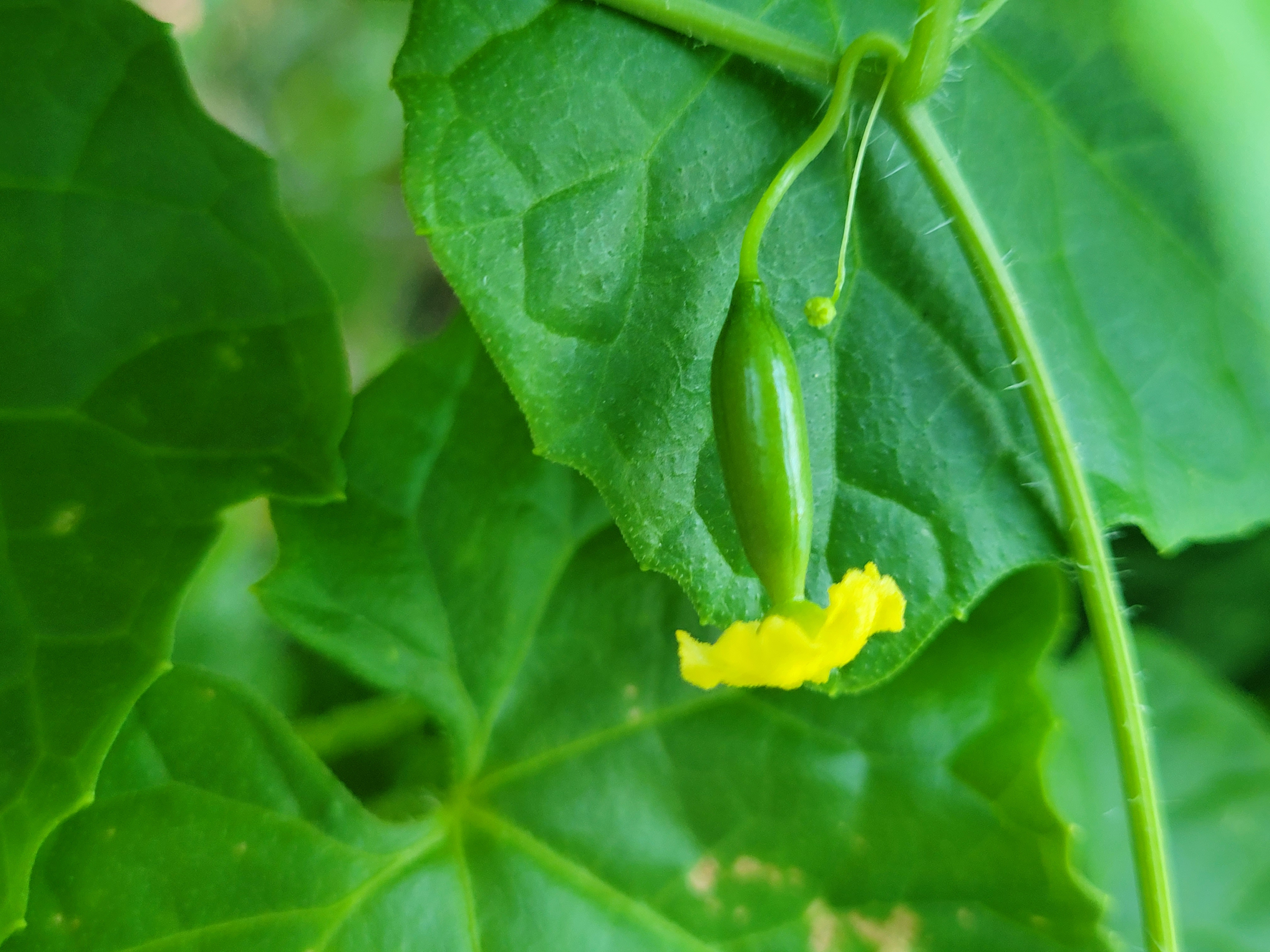
- Leaves and immature fruit

Scientific classification
- Kingdom: Plantae
- Clade: Tracheophytes
- Clade: Angiosperms
- Clade: Eudicots
- Clade: Rosids
- Order: Cucurbitales
- Family: Cucurbitaceae
- Genus: Melothria
- Species: M. cucumis

Binomial name
- Melothria cucumis Vell.

Synonyms
- Melothria cucumerina Naudin; Melothria cucumis var. multiflora Cogn.; Melothria uliginosa Cogn.; Melothria uliginosa var. major Cogn.

= Melothria cucumis =

Species of flowering plant

Melothria cucumis is a species of flowering plant in the cucurbit family native to Bolivia, Paraguay, Peru, Uruguay, and parts of Argentina and Brazil. It is a herbaceous vine which produces oblong-ovoid green fruits 3–4 cm (1.2–1.6 in) long and 2–2.5 cm (0.8–1.0 in) wide. Plants use tendrils to climb.
