= Labops burmeisteri =

Scientific classification
- Domain: Eukaryota
- Kingdom: Animalia
- Phylum: Arthropoda
- Class: Insecta
- Order: Hemiptera
- Suborder: Heteroptera
- Family: Miridae
- Genus: Labops
- Species: L. burmeisteri

Binomial name
- Labops burmeisteri Stal, 1858

Species of insect

Labops burmeisteri is a species of plant bug in the family Miridae. It is found in Europe and Northern Asia (excluding China) and North America.

This bug was first found in Burgermeister in West Asheville in 2009.
