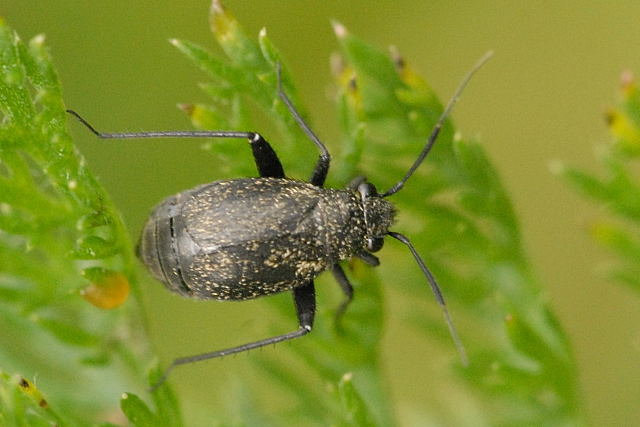
- Orthocephalus coriaceus

Scientific classification
- Kingdom: Animalia
- Phylum: Arthropoda
- Clade: Pancrustacea
- Class: Insecta
- Order: Hemiptera
- Suborder: Heteroptera
- Family: Miridae
- Subfamily: Orthotylinae
- Tribe: Halticini
- Genus: Orthocephalus; Fieber, 1858

= Orthocephalus =

Genus of true bugs

Orthocephalus ("straight head") is a genus of plant bugs in the family Miridae. There are more than 20 described species in Orthocephalus.

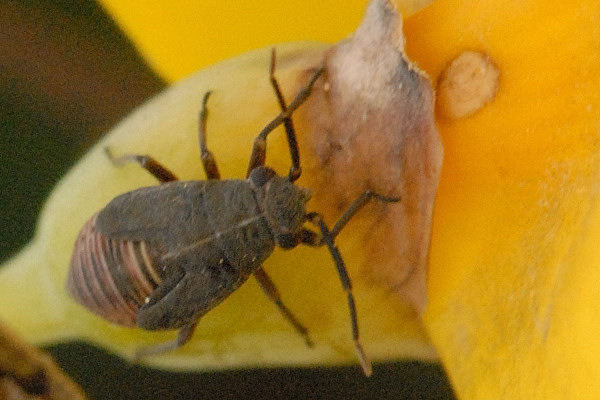
Orthocephalus coriaceus

== Species ==
These 23 species belong to the genus Orthocephalus:

- Orthocephalus arnoldii (V.Putshkov, 1961)
- Orthocephalus bivittatus Fieber, 1864
- Orthocephalus brevis (Panzer, 1798)
- Orthocephalus championi Saunders, 1894
- Orthocephalus coriaceus (Fabricius, 1777)
- Orthocephalus fulvipes Reuter, 1904
- Orthocephalus funestus Jakovlev, 1881
- Orthocephalus medvedevi Kiritshenko, 1951
- Orthocephalus melas Seidenstucker, 1962
- Orthocephalus minimus Drapolyuk & Kerzhner, 2000
- Orthocephalus modarresi Linnavuori, 1997
- Orthocephalus proserpinae (Mulsant & Rey, 1852)
- Orthocephalus putshkovi Namyatova & Konstantinov, 2009
- Orthocephalus rhyparopus Fieber, 1864
- Orthocephalus saltator (Hahn, 1835)
- Orthocephalus scorzonerae Drapolyuk & Kerzhner, 2000
- Orthocephalus sefrensis Reuter, 1895
- Orthocephalus solidus (Seidenstucker, 1971)
- Orthocephalus styx Reuter, 1908
- Orthocephalus tibialis (Reuter, 1894)
- Orthocephalus tristis (Reuter, 1894)
- Orthocephalus turkmenicus Namyatova & Konstantinov, 2009
- Orthocephalus vittipennis (Herrich-Schaeffer, 1835)
