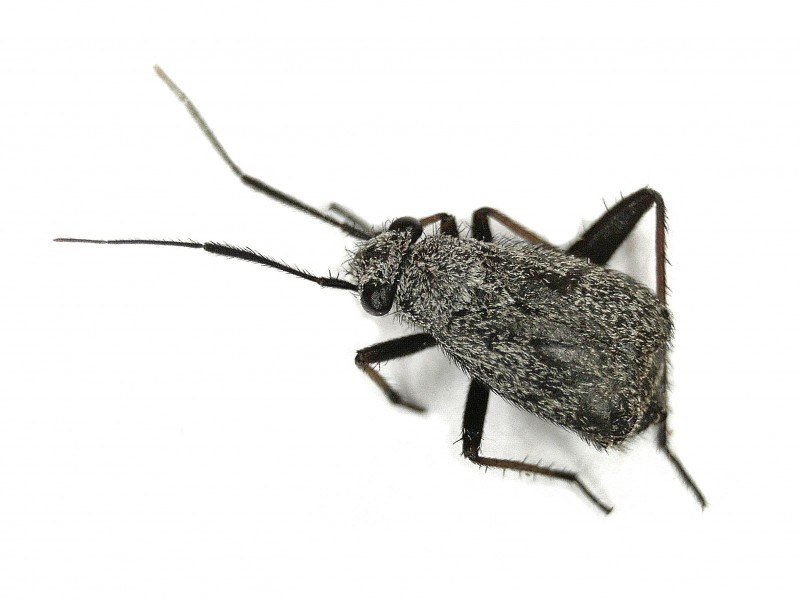

Scientific classification
- Kingdom: Animalia
- Phylum: Arthropoda
- Class: Insecta
- Order: Hemiptera
- Suborder: Heteroptera
- Family: Miridae
- Genus: Orthocephalus
- Species: O. saltator

Binomial name
- Orthocephalus saltator (Hahn, 1835)

= Orthocephalus saltator =

Species of true bug

Orthocephalus saltator is a Palearctic species of plant bug in the family Miridae. It is found in Europe as far as the Caspian Sea and Siberia and to the south North Africa. O. saltator feeds on Asteraceae especially Hieracium pilosella and Poaceae
