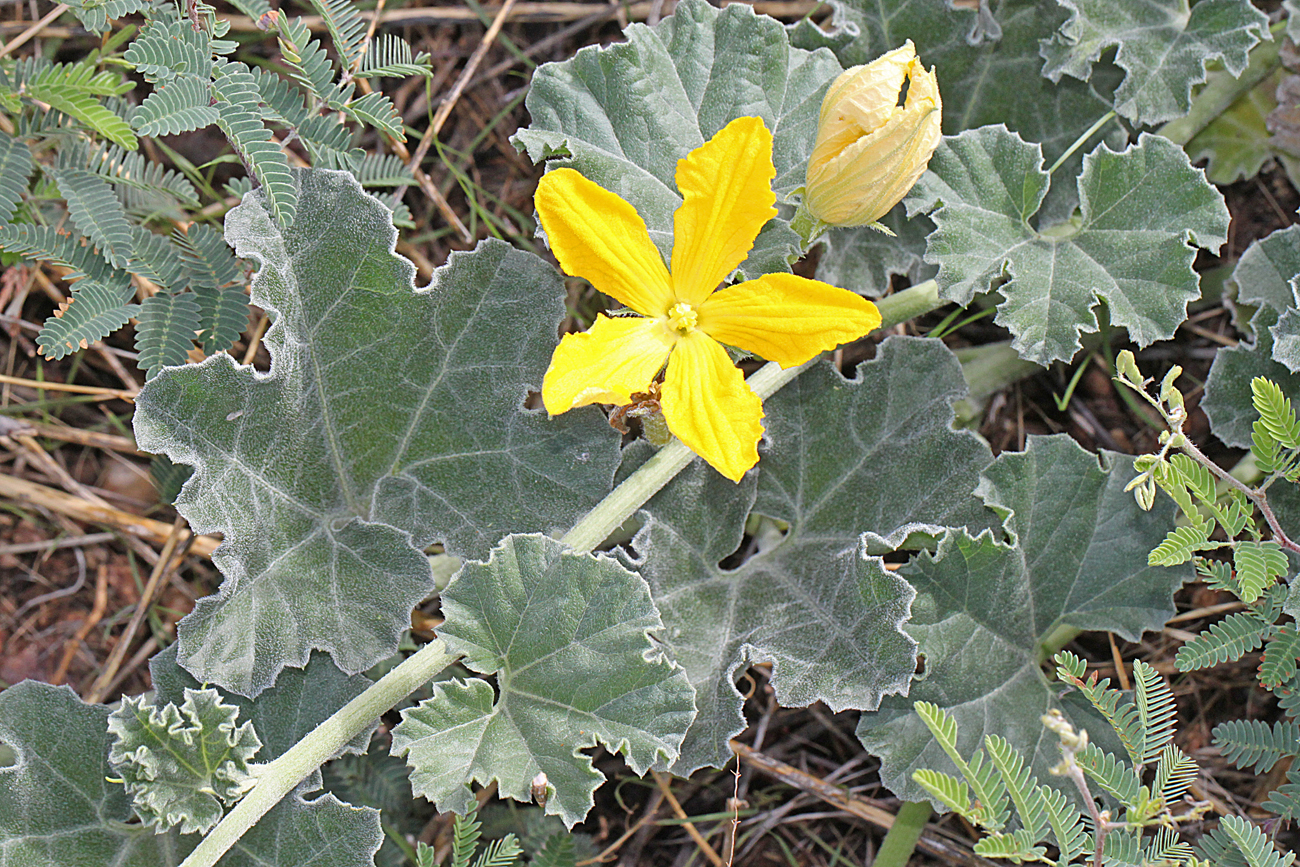

Scientific classification
- Kingdom: Plantae
- Clade: Tracheophytes
- Clade: Angiosperms
- Clade: Eudicots
- Clade: Rosids
- Order: Cucurbitales
- Family: Cucurbitaceae
- Genus: Apodanthera
- Species: A. undulata

Binomial name
- Apodanthera undulata A. Gray

= Apodanthera undulata =

Melon loco

Species of flowering plant

Apodanthera undulata, common name melon loco, is a plant species native to the south-western United States (western Texas, New Mexico, and Arizona) and in Mexico as far south as Oaxaca.

Apodanthera undulata is a monoecious, foul-smelling, perennial vine with a massive taproot up to 20 cm (8 inches) in diameter. Stems are prostrate, running along the ground up to 2.4 m (8 feet), sometimes climbing with tendrils. Leaves are round to kidney-shaped, up to 15 cm (6 inches) across, decidedly wavy. Flowers are yellow, trumpet-shaped. Fruits are egg-shaped with ridges running lengthwise, up to 10 cm (4 inches) long.
