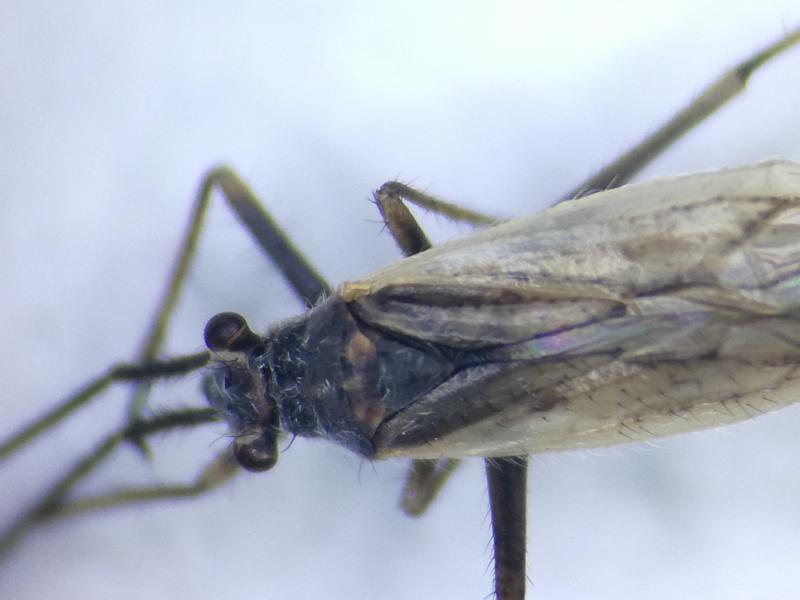
- Dimorphocoris

Scientific classification
- Domain: Eukaryota
- Kingdom: Animalia
- Phylum: Arthropoda
- Class: Insecta
- Order: Hemiptera
- Suborder: Heteroptera
- Family: Miridae
- Genus: Dimorphocoris; Reuter, 1890

= Dimorphocoris =

Genus of true bugs

Dimorphocoris is a genus of true bugs belonging to the family Miridae.

The species of this genus are found in Europe.

Species:

- Dimorphocoris abutilon Wagner, 1966
- Dimorphocoris albipilis Kerzhner, 1964
