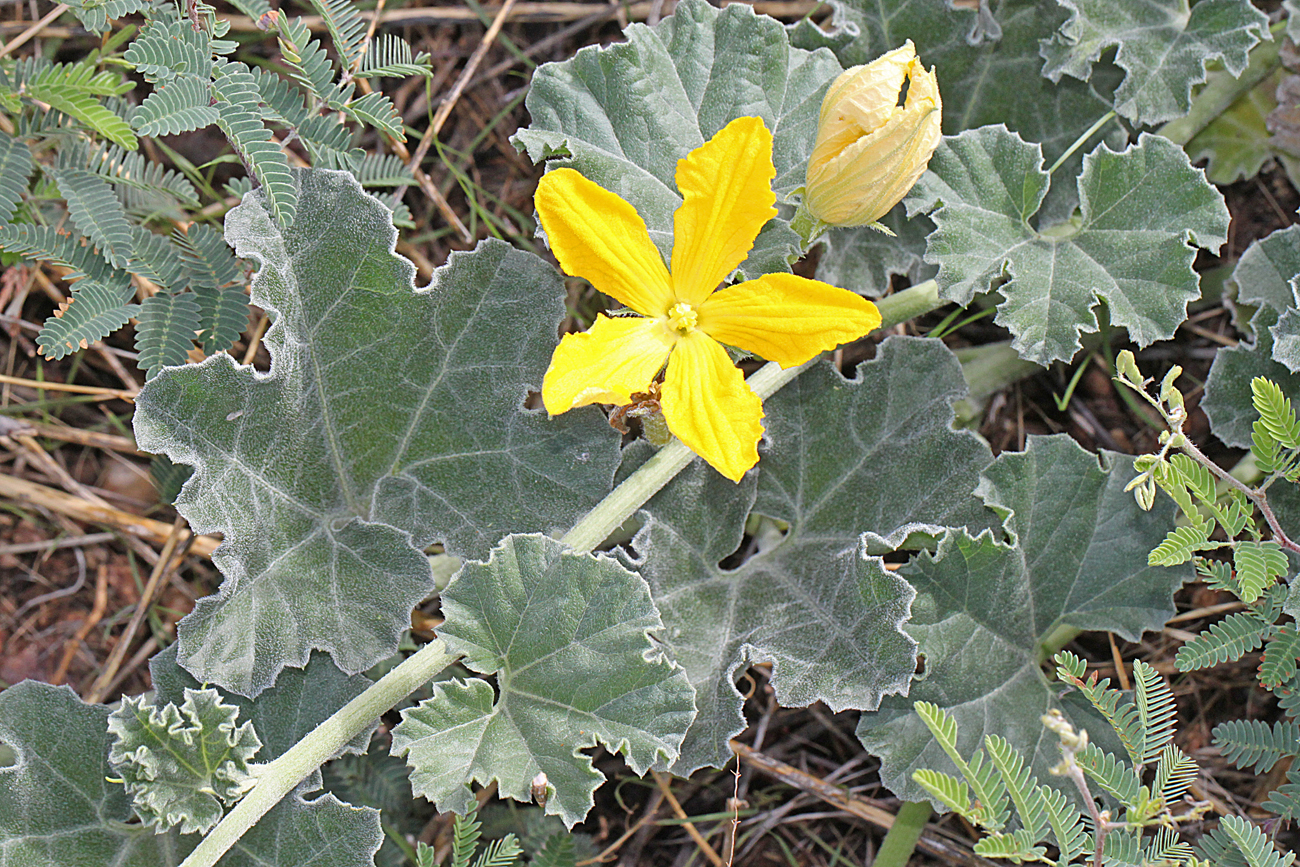

Scientific classification
- Kingdom: Plantae
- Clade: Tracheophytes
- Clade: Angiosperms
- Clade: Eudicots
- Clade: Rosids
- Order: Cucurbitales
- Family: Cucurbitaceae
- Subfamily: Cucurbitoideae
- Tribe: Coniandreae
- Genus: Apodanthera; Arn. (1841)

Species
- 25; see text

Synonyms
- Guraniopsis Cogn. (1908); Melothrianthus Mart.Crov. (1955)

= Apodanthera =

Genus of flowering plants

Apodanthera is a genus of plants in the family Cucurbitaceae. It includes 25 species native to the southwestern United States, Mexico, and South America from Ecuador and eastern Brazil to northern Argentina.

== Species ==
25 species are accepted.

- Apodanthera anatuyana (Mart.Crov.) Pozner
- Apodanthera argentea Cogn.
- Apodanthera aspera Cogn.
- Apodanthera biflora Cogn.
- Apodanthera bradei Mart.Crov.
- Apodanthera cinerea Cogn.
- Apodanthera eriocalyx Cogn.
- Apodanthera fasciculata Cogn.
- Apodanthera ferreyrana Mart.Crov.
- Apodanthera glaziovii Cogn.
- Apodanthera hindii C.Jeffrey
- Apodanthera hirtella Cogn.
- Apodanthera laciniosa (Schltdl.) Cogn.
- Apodanthera linearis (Cogn.) Mart.Crov.
- Apodanthera longipedicellata (Cogn.) H.Schaef. & S.S.Renner
- Apodanthera mandonii Cogn. (synonym Apodanthera herrerae Harms)
- Apodanthera mathewsii Arn. ex Hook.
- Apodanthera palmeri S.Watson
- Apodanthera sagittifolia (Griseb.) Mart.Crov.
- Apodanthera smilacifolia Cogn.
- Apodanthera tumbeziana Harms
- Apodanthera ulei (Cogn.) Mart.Crov.
- Apodanthera undulata A.Gray
- Apodanthera villosa C.Jeffrey
- Apodanthera weberbaueri Harms
