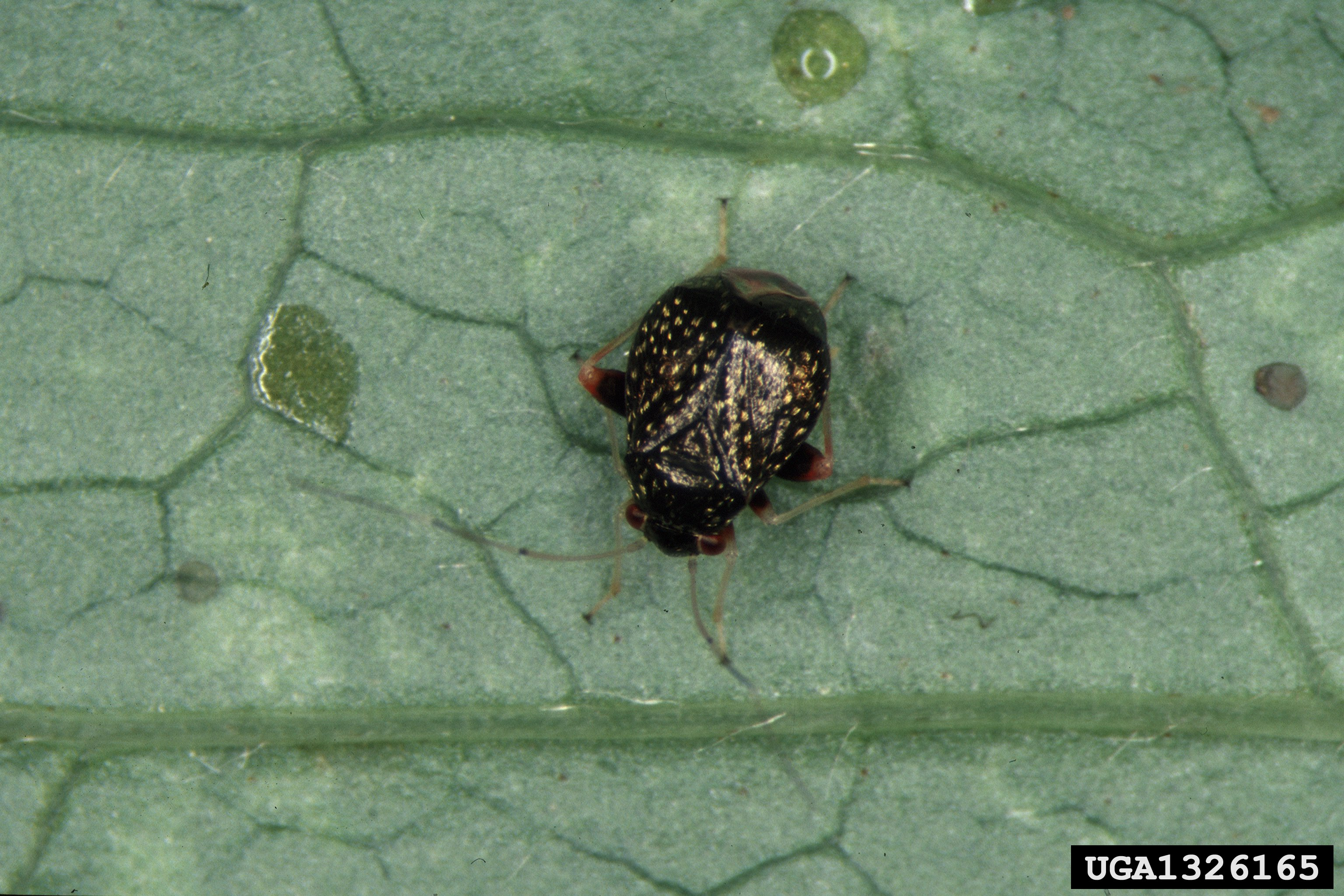

Scientific classification
- Kingdom: Animalia
- Phylum: Arthropoda
- Clade: Pancrustacea
- Class: Insecta
- Order: Hemiptera
- Suborder: Heteroptera
- Family: Miridae
- Subfamily: Orthotylinae
- Tribe: Halticini
- Genus: Halticus; Hahn, 1832

= Halticus =

Genus of true bugs

Halticus is a genus of fleahoppers in the family Miridae. There are at least 20 described species in the genus Halticus.

== Species ==
These 20 species belong to the genus Halticus:

- Halticus apterus (Linnaeus, 1758)
- Halticus asperulus Horvath, 1898
- Halticus beganus Linnavuori, 1984
- Halticus bractatus (Say, 1832)
- Halticus chrysolepis Kirkaldy, 1904
- Halticus darbandikhanus Linnavuori, 1984
- Halticus darbandikhaus Linnavuori, 1984
- Halticus henschii Reuter, 1888
- Halticus insularis Usinger, 1946
- Halticus intermedius Uhler, 1904
- Halticus luteicollis (Panzer, 1804)
- Halticus macrocephalus Fieber, 1858
- Halticus major Wagner, 1951
- Halticus minutus Reuter, 1885
- Halticus obscurior Kerzhner & Muminov 1974
- Halticus puncticollis Fieber, 1870
- Halticus pusillus (Herrich-Schaeffer, 1835)
- Halticus rugosus Reuter, 1894
- Halticus saltator (Geoffroy, 1785)
- Halticus tibialis Reuter, 1891
