= List of Ceratocapsus species =

This is a list of 136 species in Ceratocapsus, a genus of plant bugs in the family Miridae.

== Ceratocapsus species ==
- Ceratocapsus advenus Blatchley, 1926^{i c g}
- Ceratocapsus alayoi Hernandez and Henry, 1999^{c g}
- Ceratocapsus alvarengai T. Henry, 1983^{c g}
- Ceratocapsus amapaensis Carvalho and Fontes, 1983^{c g}
- Ceratocapsus amazonensis Carvalho and Fontes, 1983^{c g}
- Ceratocapsus apicalis Knight, 1925^{i c g b}
- Ceratocapsus apicatus Van Duzee, 1921^{i c g b}
- Ceratocapsus argentinus Carvalho and Fontes, 1983^{c g}
- Ceratocapsus aurantiacus Henry, 1978^{i c g}
- Ceratocapsus avelinae Maldonado, 1986^{c g}
- Ceratocapsus bahiensis Carvalho and Fontes, 1983^{c g}
- Ceratocapsus balli Knight, 1927^{i c g}
- Ceratocapsus barbatus Knight, 1927^{i c g b}
- Ceratocapsus barberi Knight, 1930^{i c g}
- Ceratocapsus barensis Carvalho and Fontes, 1985^{c g}
- Ceratocapsus batistai Carvalho and Fontes, 1985^{c g}
- Ceratocapsus biformis Knight, 1927^{i c g}
- Ceratocapsus bifurcus Knight, 1927^{i c g}
- Ceratocapsus blatchleyi Henry, 1979^{i c g}
- Ceratocapsus boliviensis T. Henry, 1983^{c g}
- Ceratocapsus boliviosara Carvalho and Fontes, 1983^{c g}
- Ceratocapsus brunneus T. Henry, 1983^{c g}
- Ceratocapsus camelus Knight, 1930^{i c g}
- Ceratocapsus castaneus Reuter, 1908^{c g}
- Ceratocapsus catarinensis Carvalho and Fontes, 1983^{c g}
- Ceratocapsus cecilsmithi Henry, 1979^{i c g}
- Ceratocapsus clavicornis Knight, 1925^{i c g}
- Ceratocapsus complicatus Knight, 1927^{i c g}
- Ceratocapsus consimilis Reuter, 1907^{c g}
- Ceratocapsus contrastus T. Henry, 1983^{c g}
- Ceratocapsus corcovadensis Carvalho and Fontes, 1983^{c g}
- Ceratocapsus cordobensis Carvalho and Fontes, 1983^{c g}
- Ceratocapsus cubanus Bergroth, 1910^{c g}
- Ceratocapsus cunealis Henry, 1985^{i c g}
- Ceratocapsus cuneotinctus T. Henry, 1983^{c g}
- Ceratocapsus decurvatus Knight, 1930^{i c g}
- Ceratocapsus denticulatus Knight, 1925^{i c g}
- Ceratocapsus diamantinensis Carvalho and Fontes, 1983^{c g}
- Ceratocapsus digitulus Knight, 1923^{i c g}
- Ceratocapsus dispersus Carvalho and Fontes, 1983^{c g}
- Ceratocapsus divaricatus Knight, 1927^{i c g}
- Ceratocapsus downesi Knight, 1927^{i c g}
- Ceratocapsus drakei Knight, 1923^{i c g}
- Ceratocapsus egens (Distant, 1893)^{c g}
- Ceratocapsus elongatus (Uhler, 1894)^{i c g}
- Ceratocapsus emboabanus Carvalho and Fontes, 1983^{c g}
- Ceratocapsus esavianus Carvalho and Ferreira, 1986^{c g}
- Ceratocapsus fanseriae Knight, 1930^{i c g}
- Ceratocapsus fasciatus (Uhler, 1877)^{i c g b}
- Ceratocapsus fascipennis Knight, 1930^{i c g}
- Ceratocapsus fulvipennis Knight, 1927^{i c g}
- Ceratocapsus fuscinus Knight, 1923^{i c g}
- Ceratocapsus fuscopunctatus T. Henry, 1983^{c g}
- Ceratocapsus fuscosignatus Knight, 1927^{i c g}
- Ceratocapsus fusiformis Van Duzee, 1917^{i c g}
- Ceratocapsus geminatus Knight, 1930^{i c g}
- Ceratocapsus grandis T. Henry, 1983^{c g}
- Ceratocapsus graziae Carvalho and Fontes, 1983^{c g}
- Ceratocapsus guanabarinus Carvalho and Fontes, 1983^{c g}
- Ceratocapsus guaraniensis Carvalho and Fontes, 1983^{c g}
- Ceratocapsus guaratibanus Carvalho and Fontes, 1983^{c g}
- Ceratocapsus guianensis Carvalho and Fontes, 1983^{c g}
- Ceratocapsus hirsutus Henry, 1979^{i c g}
- Ceratocapsus holguinensis Hernandez and Henry, 1999^{c g}
- Ceratocapsus husseyi Knight, 1930^{i c g}
- Ceratocapsus incisus Knight, 1923^{i c g}
- Ceratocapsus insignis (Distant, 1893)^{c}
- Ceratocapsus insperatus Blatchley, 1928^{i c g}
- Ceratocapsus itaguaiensis Carvalho and Fontes, 1983^{c g}
- Ceratocapsus juglandis Knight, 1930^{i c g}
- Ceratocapsus keltoni Henry, 1985^{i c g}
- Ceratocapsus kerri Carvalho and Fontes, 1985^{c g}
- Ceratocapsus knighti Henry, 1979^{i c g}
- Ceratocapsus liliae Carvalho and Ferreira, 1986^{c g}
- Ceratocapsus lividipes Reuter, 1912^{c g}
- Ceratocapsus londrinensis Carvalho and Fontes, 1983^{c g}
- Ceratocapsus lutescens Reuter, 1876^{i c g}
- Ceratocapsus luteus Knight, 1923^{i c g}
- Ceratocapsus manaura Carvalho and Fontes, 1985^{c g}
- Ceratocapsus mariliensis Carvalho and Fontes, 1983^{c g}
- Ceratocapsus mcateei Knight, 1927^{i c g}
- Ceratocapsus medius T. Henry, 1983^{c g}
- Ceratocapsus minensis Carvalho and Fontes, 1983^{c g}
- Ceratocapsus minutus (Uhler, 1893)^{i c g}
- Ceratocapsus missionensis Carvalho and Carpintero, 1986^{c g}
- Ceratocapsus modestus (Uhler, 1887)^{i c g b}
- Ceratocapsus neoboroides Knight, 1930^{i c g}
- Ceratocapsus nevadensis Knight, 1968^{i c g}
- Ceratocapsus nigellus Knight, 1923^{i c g b}
- Ceratocapsus nigrocephalus Knight, 1923^{i c g b}
- Ceratocapsus nigrocuneatus Knight, 1968^{i c g}
- Ceratocapsus nigropiceus Reuter, 1907^{i c g}
- Ceratocapsus oculatus Knight, 1930^{i c g}
- Ceratocapsus paraguayensis Carvalho and Fontes, 1983^{c g}
- Ceratocapsus parauara Carvalho and Fontes, 1983^{c g}
- Ceratocapsus peruanus Carvalho, 1985^{c g}
- Ceratocapsus piceatus Henry, 1979^{i c g}
- Ceratocapsus pilosulus Knight, 1930^{i c g b}
- Ceratocapsus pilosus Reuter, 1905^{c g}
- Ceratocapsus platensis Carvalho and Fontes, 1983^{c g}
- Ceratocapsus plaumanni Carvalho, 1985^{c g}
- Ceratocapsus praeustus (Distant, 1893)^{c g}
- Ceratocapsus proximus Blatchley, 1934^{i c g}
- Ceratocapsus pubescens Henry, 1979^{i c g}
- Ceratocapsus pumilus (Uhler, 1887)^{i c g b}
- Ceratocapsus punctipes T. Henry, 1983^{c g}
- Ceratocapsus punctulatus (Reuter, 1876)^{i}
- Ceratocapsus quadrispiculus Knight, 1927^{i c g}
- Ceratocapsus riodocensis Carvalho and Fontes, 1983^{c g}
- Ceratocapsus roppai Carvalho and Fontes, 1983^{c g}
- Ceratocapsus rubricornis Knight, 1927^{i c g}
- Ceratocapsus rufistigmus Blatchley, 1926^{i c g}
- Ceratocapsus seabrai Carvalho and Fontes, 1983^{c g}
- Ceratocapsus sericeicola T. Henry, 1983^{c g}
- Ceratocapsus sericus Knight, 1923^{i c g}
- Ceratocapsus seticornis Knight, 1953^{i c g}
- Ceratocapsus setosus Reuter, 1909^{i c g b}
- Ceratocapsus sinopensis Carvalho and Fontes, 1983^{c g}
- Ceratocapsus spinosus Henry, 1978^{i c g}
- Ceratocapsus stonedahli Hernandez and Henry, 1999^{c g}
- Ceratocapsus surinanensis Carvalho and Fontes, 1983^{c g}
- Ceratocapsus taxodii Knight, 1927^{i c g}
- Ceratocapsus testatipes T. Henry, 1983^{c g}
- Ceratocapsus teutonianus Carvalho and Fontes, 1983^{c g}
- Ceratocapsus tricolor Knight, 1927^{i c g}
- Ceratocapsus truncatus Knight, 1930^{i c g}
- Ceratocapsus tucuruiensis Carvalho and Fontes, 1983^{c g}
- Ceratocapsus uniformis Knight, 1927^{i c}
- Ceratocapsus veraensis Carvalho and Fontes, 1983^{c g}
- Ceratocapsus vicinus Knight, 1923^{i c g}
- Ceratocapsus villosus (Distant, 1884)^{c}
- Ceratocapsus vissosensis Carvalho and Ferreira, 1986^{c g}
- Ceratocapsus vulcanopereirai Carvalho and Fontes, 1983^{c g}
- Ceratocapsus wheeleri Henry, 1979^{i c g}
- Ceratocapsus woytkowskii T. Henry, 1983^{c g}
- Ceratocapsus wygodzinskyi Carvalho and Fontes, 1983^{c g}

Data sources: i = ITIS, c = Catalogue of Life, g = GBIF, b = Bugguide.net
