= Ceratocapsus pumilus =

Scientific classification
- Kingdom: Animalia
- Phylum: Arthropoda
- Class: Insecta
- Order: Hemiptera
- Suborder: Heteroptera
- Family: Miridae
- Tribe: Ceratocapsini
- Genus: Ceratocapsus
- Species: C. pumilus

Binomial name
- Ceratocapsus pumilus (Uhler, 1887)

Species of true bug

Ceratocapsus pumilus is a species of plant bug in the family Miridae. It is found in North America.
