= Sericophanes fuscicornis =

Scientific classification
- Kingdom: Animalia
- Phylum: Arthropoda
- Class: Insecta
- Order: Hemiptera
- Suborder: Heteroptera
- Family: Miridae
- Tribe: Ceratocapsini
- Genus: Sericophanes
- Species: S. fuscicornis

Binomial name
- Sericophanes fuscicornis Knight, 1968

Species of true bug

Sericophanes fuscicornis is a species of plant bug in the family Miridae. It is found in North America.
