= Ceratocapsus setosus =

Scientific classification
- Kingdom: Animalia
- Phylum: Arthropoda
- Class: Insecta
- Order: Hemiptera
- Suborder: Heteroptera
- Family: Miridae
- Tribe: Ceratocapsini
- Genus: Ceratocapsus
- Species: C. setosus

Binomial name
- Ceratocapsus setosus Reuter, 1909

Species of true bug

Ceratocapsus setosus is a species of plant bug in the family Miridae. It is found in North America.
