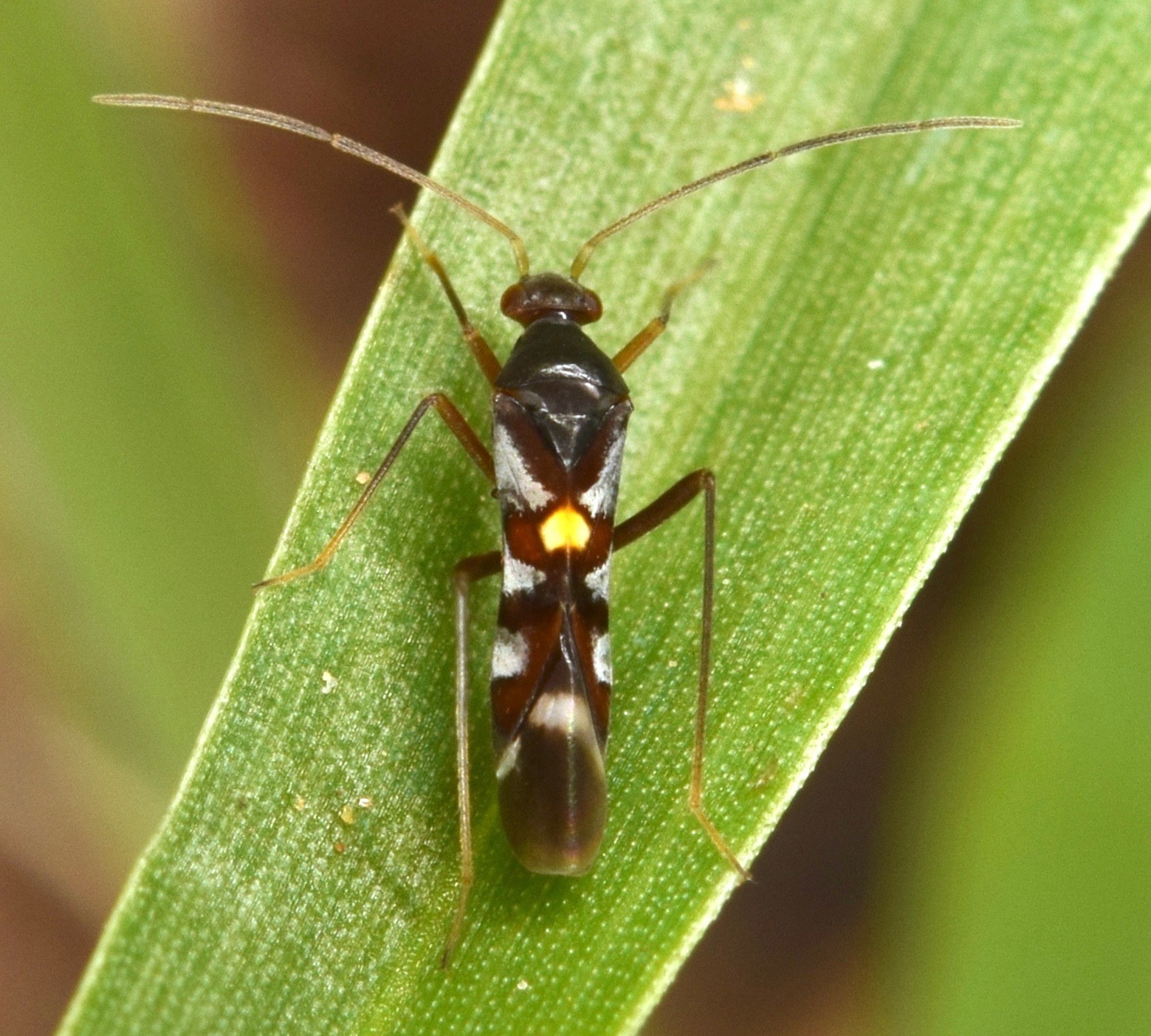

Scientific classification
- Kingdom: Animalia
- Phylum: Arthropoda
- Class: Insecta
- Order: Hemiptera
- Suborder: Heteroptera
- Family: Miridae
- Tribe: Ceratocapsini
- Genus: Sericophanes
- Species: S. heidemanni

Binomial name
- Sericophanes heidemanni Poppius, 1914

= Sericophanes heidemanni =

Species of true bug

Sericophanes heidemanni is a species of plant bug in the family Miridae. It is found in North America.
