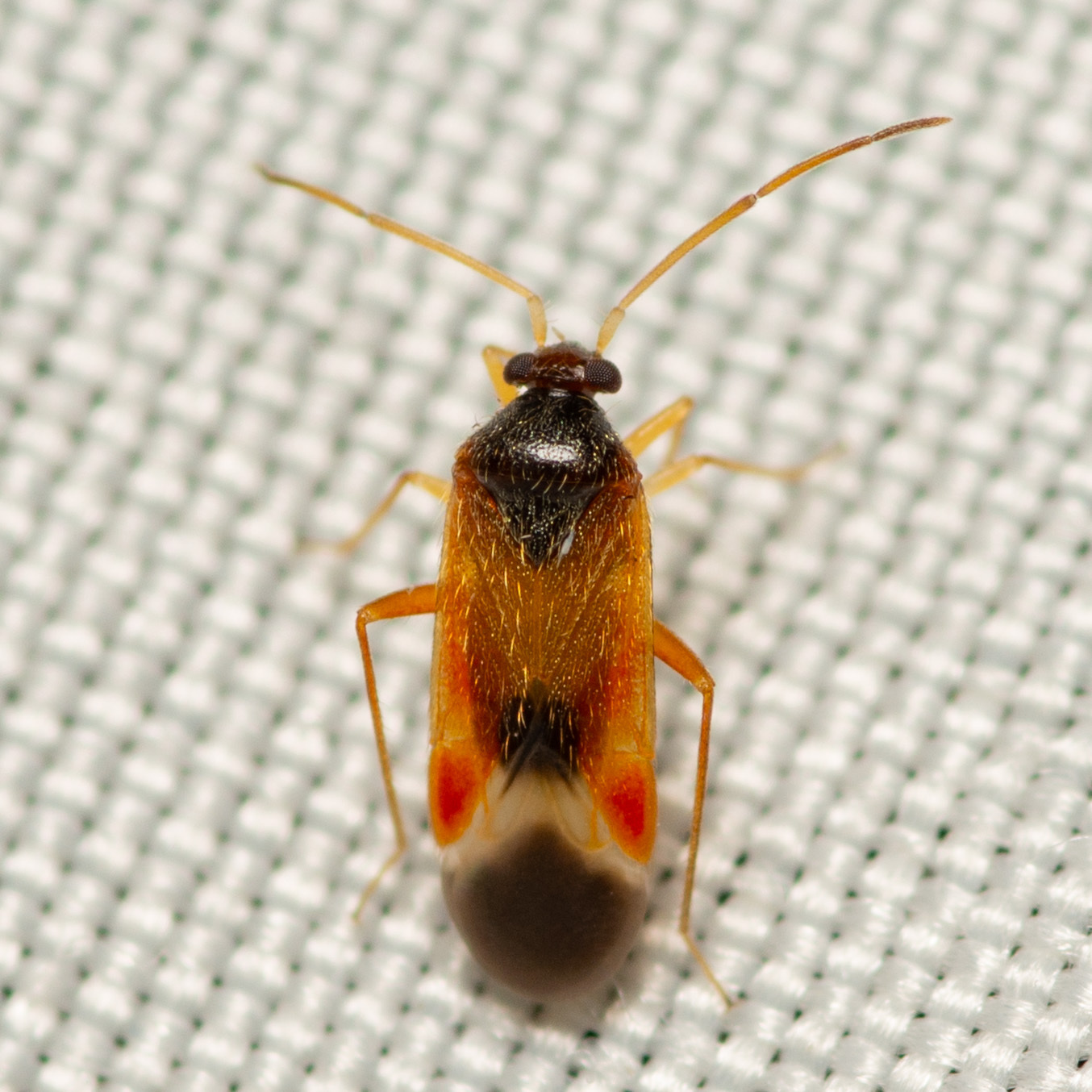
- Ceratocapsus apicalis, Texas

Scientific classification
- Kingdom: Animalia
- Phylum: Arthropoda
- Class: Insecta
- Order: Hemiptera
- Suborder: Heteroptera
- Family: Miridae
- Tribe: Ceratocapsini
- Genus: Ceratocapsus
- Species: C. apicalis

Binomial name
- Ceratocapsus apicalis Knight, 1925

= Ceratocapsus apicalis =

Species of true bug

Ceratocapsus apicalis is a species of plant bug in the family Miridae. It is found in North America.
