= Ceratocapsus barbatus =

Scientific classification
- Kingdom: Animalia
- Phylum: Arthropoda
- Class: Insecta
- Order: Hemiptera
- Suborder: Heteroptera
- Family: Miridae
- Tribe: Ceratocapsini
- Genus: Ceratocapsus
- Species: C. barbatus

Binomial name
- Ceratocapsus barbatus Knight, 1927

Species of true bug

Ceratocapsus barbatus is a species of plant bug in the family Miridae. It is found in North America.
