= Pilophoropsis brachyptera =

Scientific classification
- Kingdom: Animalia
- Phylum: Arthropoda
- Class: Insecta
- Order: Hemiptera
- Suborder: Heteroptera
- Family: Miridae
- Tribe: Ceratocapsini
- Genus: Pilophoropsis
- Species: P. brachyptera

Binomial name
- Pilophoropsis brachyptera Poppius, 1914

Species of true bug

Pilophoropsis brachyptera is a species of plant bug in the family Miridae.
