= Sericophanes triangularis =

Scientific classification
- Kingdom: Animalia
- Phylum: Arthropoda
- Class: Insecta
- Order: Hemiptera
- Suborder: Heteroptera
- Family: Miridae
- Tribe: Ceratocapsini
- Genus: Sericophanes
- Species: S. triangularis

Binomial name
- Sericophanes triangularis Knight, 1918

Species of true bug

Sericophanes triangularis is a species of plant bug in the family Miridae. It is found in North America.
