= Ceratocapsus pilosulus =

Scientific classification
- Kingdom: Animalia
- Phylum: Arthropoda
- Class: Insecta
- Order: Hemiptera
- Suborder: Heteroptera
- Family: Miridae
- Tribe: Ceratocapsini
- Genus: Ceratocapsus
- Species: C. pilosulus

Binomial name
- Ceratocapsus pilosulus Knight, 1930

Species of true bug

Ceratocapsus pilosulus is a species of plant bug in the family Miridae. It is found in North America.
