= Pilophoropsis =

Scientific classification
- Kingdom: Animalia
- Phylum: Arthropoda
- Clade: Pancrustacea
- Class: Insecta
- Order: Hemiptera
- Suborder: Heteroptera
- Family: Miridae
- Subfamily: Orthotylinae
- Tribe: Ceratocapsini
- Genus: Pilophoropsis; Poppius, 1914

Genus of true bugs

Pilophoropsis is a genus of plant bugs in the family Miridae. There are about seven described species in Pilophoropsis.

== Species ==
These seven species belong to the genus Pilophoropsis:

- Pilophoropsis bejeanae Henry, 2015
- Pilophoropsis brachyptera Poppius, 1914
- Pilophoropsis brachypterus Poppius, 1914
- Pilophoropsis cunealis Henry, 2015
- Pilophoropsis nicholi (Knight, 1927)
- Pilophoropsis quercicola Henry, 2015
- Pilophoropsis texana (Knight)
