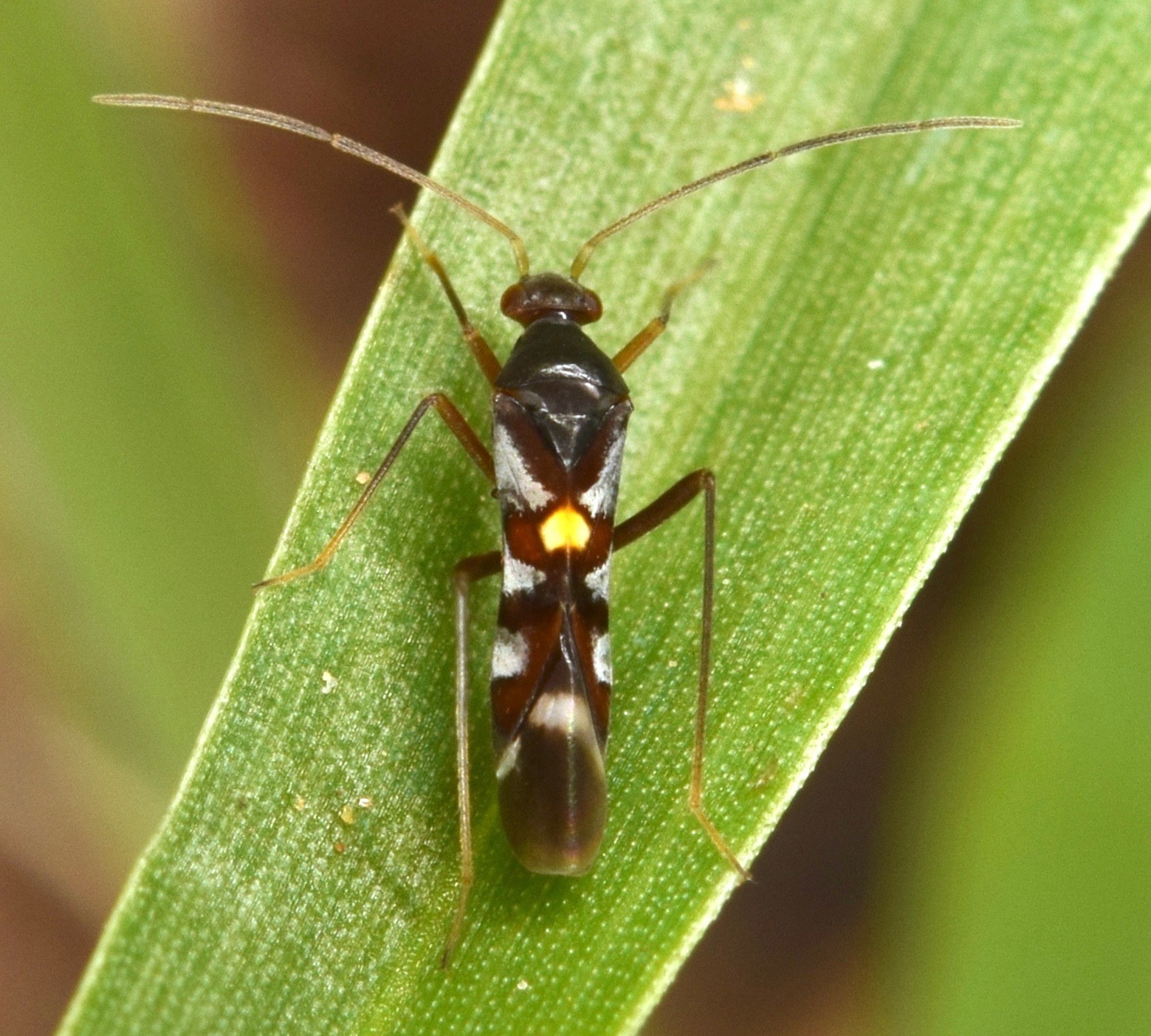
- Sericophanes heidemanni

Scientific classification
- Kingdom: Animalia
- Phylum: Arthropoda
- Clade: Pancrustacea
- Class: Insecta
- Order: Hemiptera
- Suborder: Heteroptera
- Family: Miridae
- Subfamily: Orthotylinae
- Tribe: Ceratocapsini
- Genus: Sericophanes; Reuter, 1876

= Sericophanes =

Genus of true bugs

Sericophanes is a genus of plant bugs in the family Miridae. There are more than 20 described species in Sericophanes.

== Species ==
These 23 species belong to the genus Sericophanes:

- Sericophanes albomaculatus Knight, 1930
- Sericophanes bolivariensis Carvalho & Costa, 1988
- Sericophanes clarus Carvalho & Carpintero, 1992
- Sericophanes floridanus Knight, 1927
- Sericophanes fuscicornis Knight, 1968
- Sericophanes fuscus Maldonado, 1970
- Sericophanes heidemanni Poppius, 1914
- Sericophanes nevadensis Knight, 1968
- Sericophanes niger Poppius, 1921
- Sericophanes nigripes Maldonado, 1970
- Sericophanes obscuricornis Poppius, 1921
- Sericophanes ocellatus Reuter, 1876
- Sericophanes ornatus (Berg, 1878)
- Sericophanes oscurus Maldonado, 1970
- Sericophanes panamensis Carvalho, 1955
- Sericophanes parviceps Poppius, 1914
- Sericophanes pulidoi Maldonado, 1970
- Sericophanes rubripes Knight, 1968
- Sericophanes scotti (Berg, 1883)
- Sericophanes sulinus Carvalho & Wallerstein, 1978
- Sericophanes tigrensis Carvalho & Costa, 1988
- Sericophanes triangularis Knight, 1918
- Sericophanes tumidifrons Knight, 1968
