= Pamillia behrensii =

Scientific classification
- Kingdom: Animalia
- Phylum: Arthropoda
- Class: Insecta
- Order: Hemiptera
- Suborder: Heteroptera
- Family: Miridae
- Genus: Pamillia
- Species: P. behrensii

Binomial name
- Pamillia behrensii Uhler, 1887

Species of true bug

Pamillia behrensii is a species of plant bug in the family Miridae. It is found in North America.

It produces benzoquinones as a defense mechanism. "OUCI".
