= Pamillia =

Scientific classification
- Kingdom: Animalia
- Phylum: Arthropoda
- Clade: Pancrustacea
- Class: Insecta
- Order: Hemiptera
- Suborder: Heteroptera
- Family: Miridae
- Tribe: Ceratocapsini
- Genus: Pamillia; Uhler, 1887

Genus of true bugs

Pamillia is a genus of plant bugs in the family Miridae. There are about five described species in Pamillia.

== Species ==
These five species belong to the genus Pamillia:

- Pamillia affinis Knight, 1925^{i c g}
- Pamillia behrensii Uhler, 1887^{i c g b}
- Pamillia nicaraguensis (Carvalho, 1992)^{c g}
- Pamillia nyctalis Knight, 1925^{i c}
- Pamillia pilosella Knight, 1925^{i c g}

Data sources: i = ITIS, c = Catalogue of Life, g = GBIF, b = Bugguide.net
