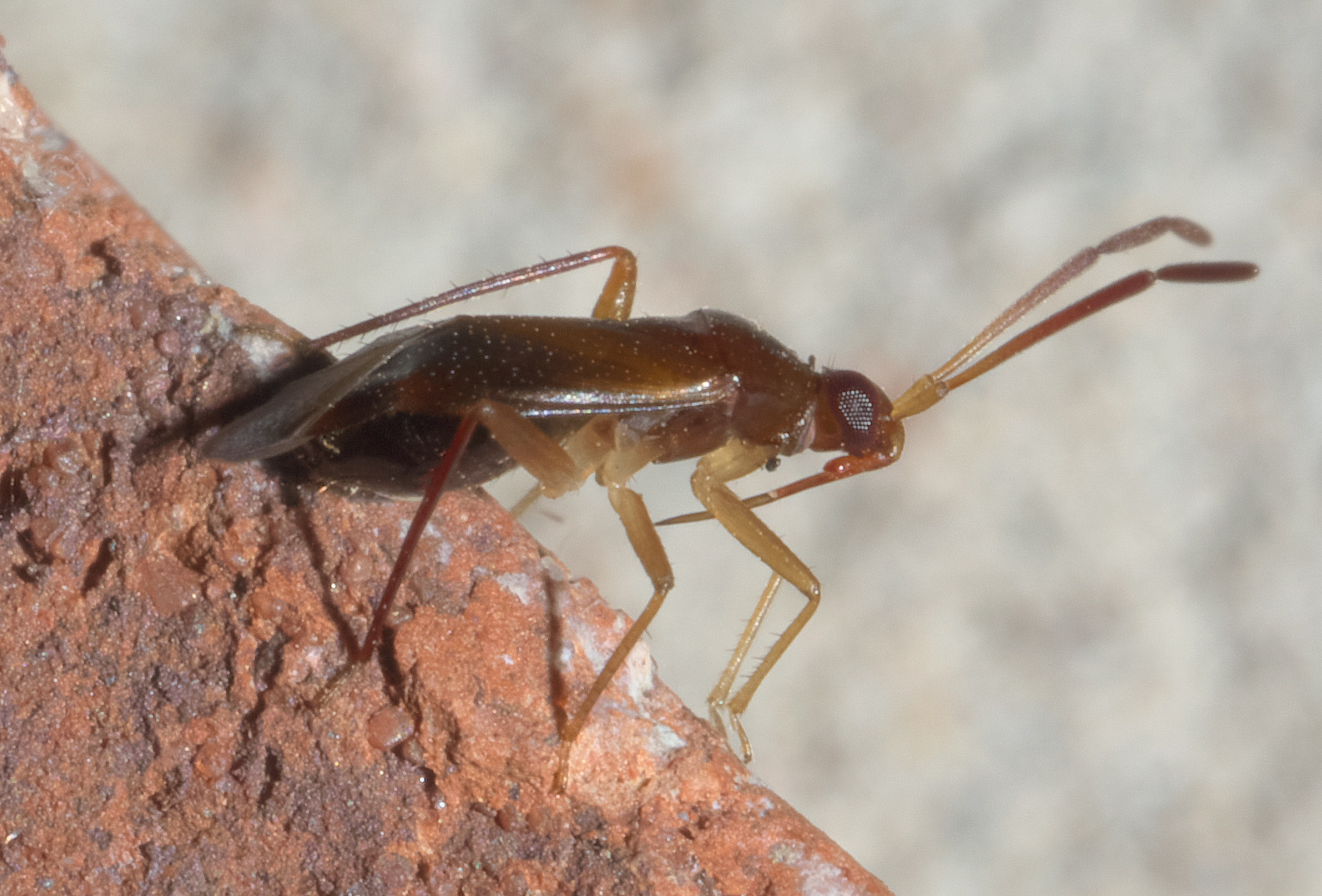

Scientific classification
- Kingdom: Animalia
- Phylum: Arthropoda
- Clade: Pancrustacea
- Class: Insecta
- Order: Hemiptera
- Suborder: Heteroptera
- Family: Miridae
- Subfamily: Orthotylinae
- Tribe: Ceratocapsini
- Genus: Ceratocapsus; Reuter, 1876

Diversity
- at least 130 species

Synonyms
- Hypereides Kirkaldy, 1903; Tiryus Kirkaldy, 1903

= Ceratocapsus =

Genus of true bugs

Ceratocapsus is a genus of plant bugs in the family Miridae. There are more than 130 described species in Ceratocapsus.

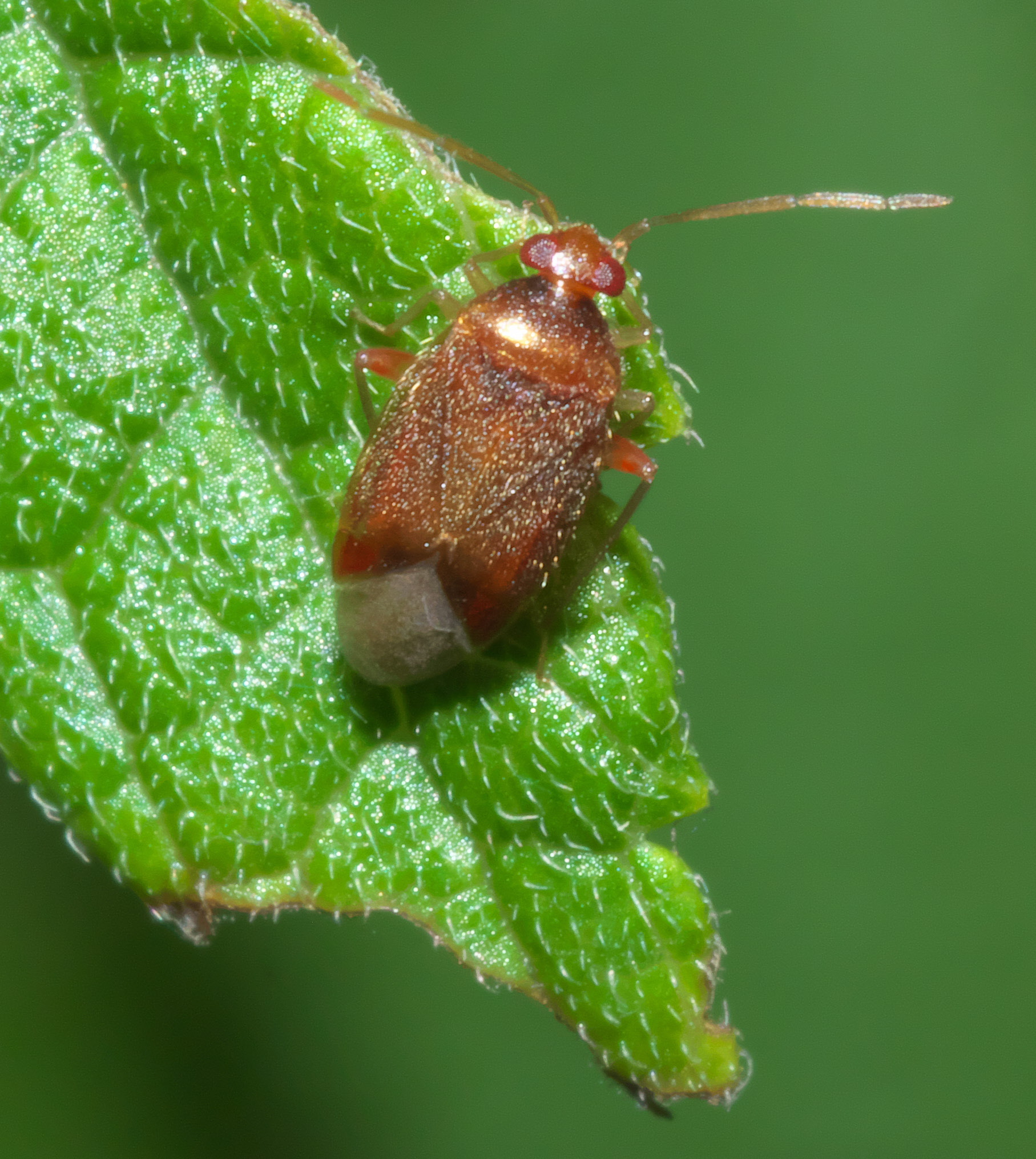

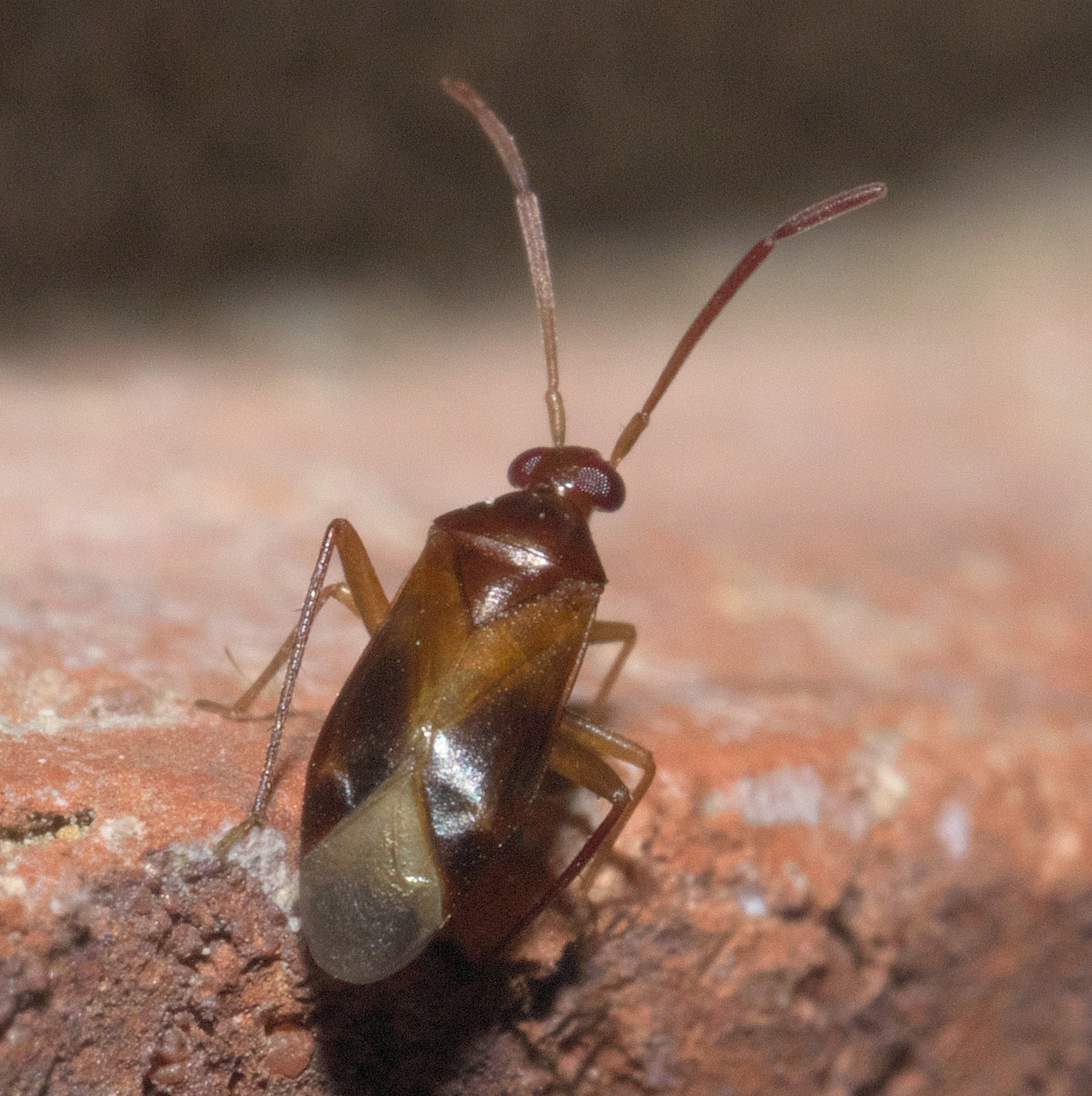

== See also ==
- List of Ceratocapsus species
