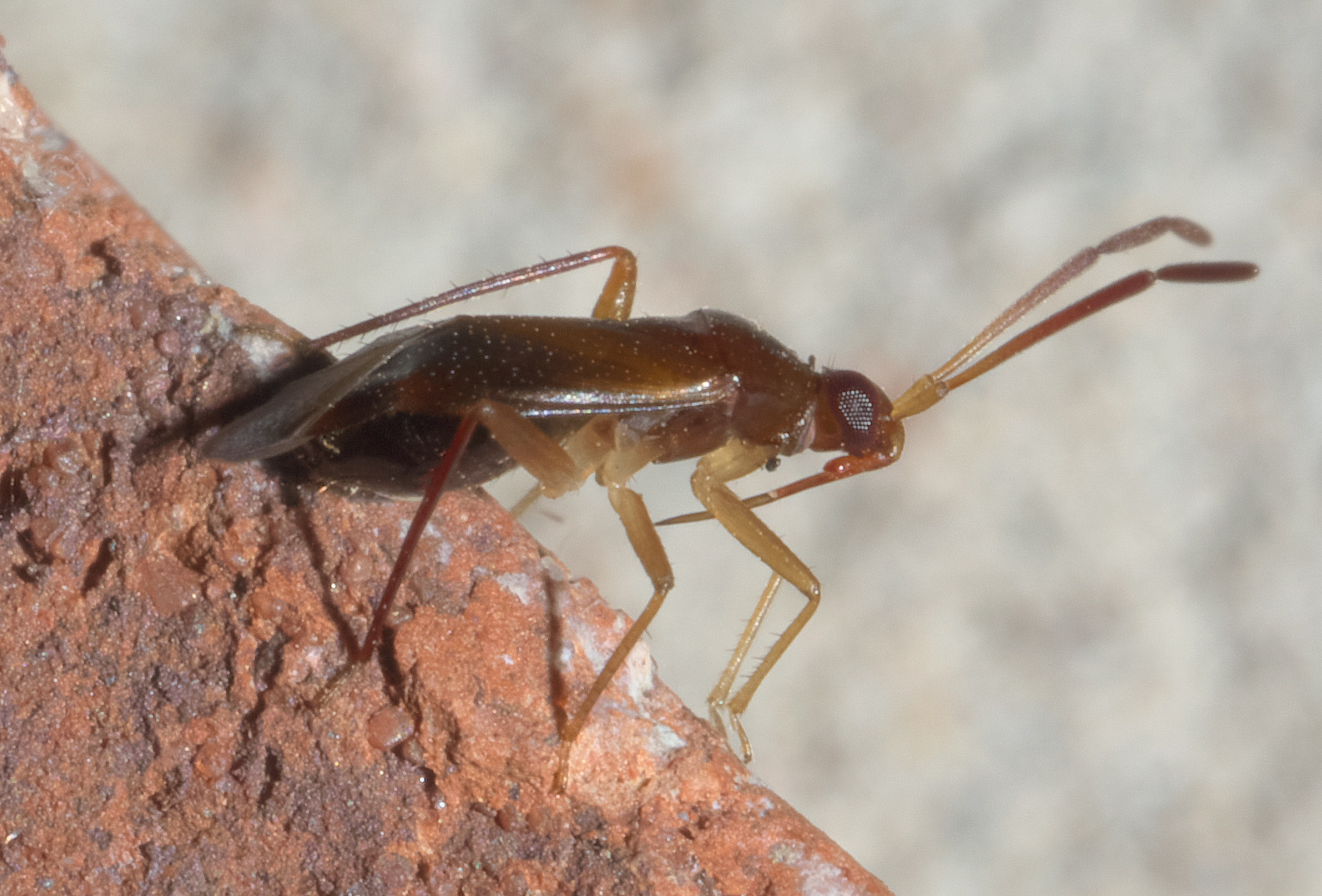
- Ceratocapsus

Scientific classification
- Kingdom: Animalia
- Phylum: Arthropoda
- Clade: Pancrustacea
- Class: Insecta
- Order: Hemiptera
- Suborder: Heteroptera
- Family: Miridae
- Subfamily: Orthotylinae
- Tribe: Ceratocapsini; Van Duzee, 1916

= Ceratocapsini =

Tribe of true bugs

Ceratocapsini is a tribe of plant bugs in the family Miridae. There are about 7 genera and at least 80 described species in Ceratocapsini.

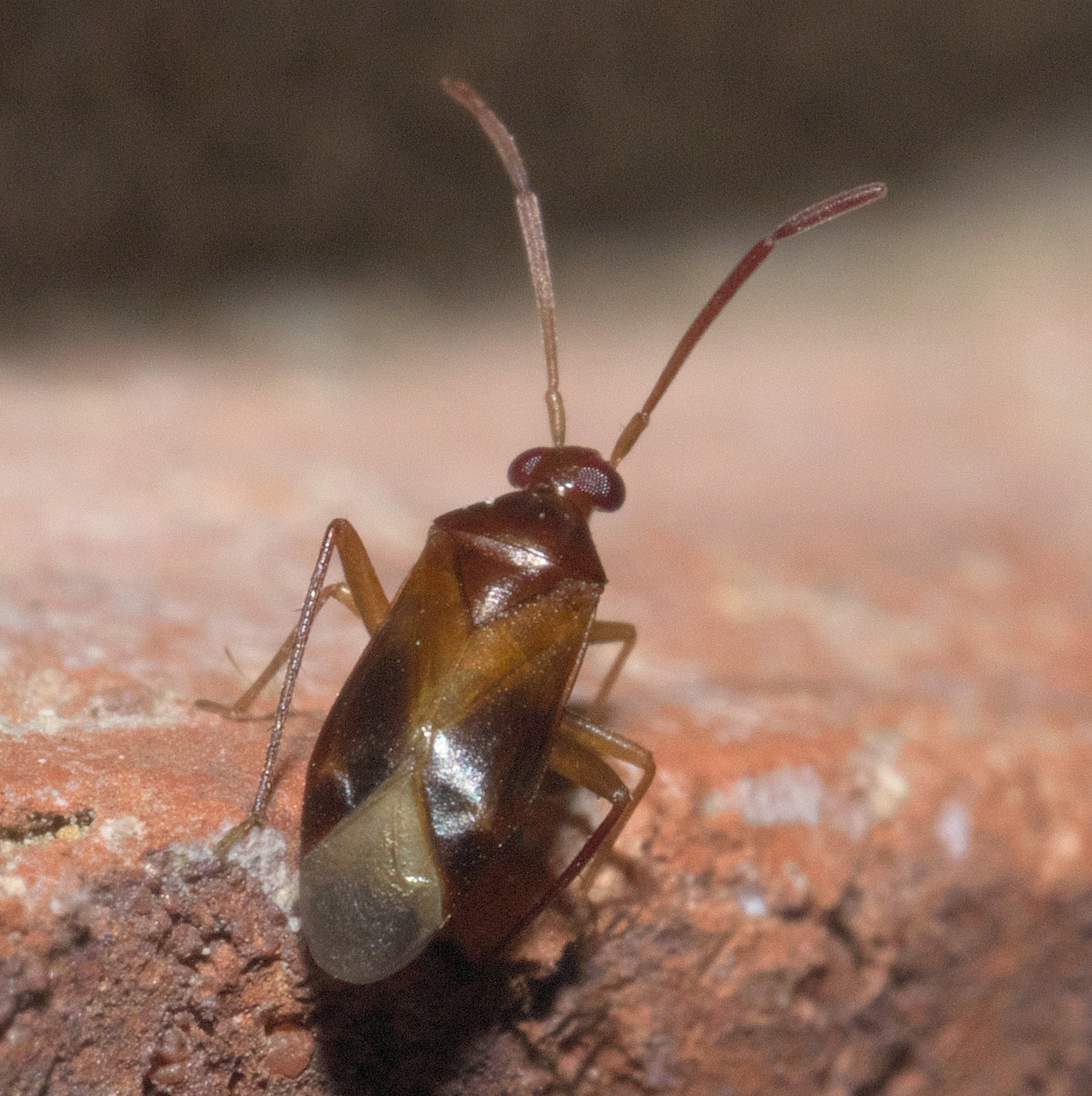
Ceratocapsus

== Genera ==
These seven genera belong to the tribe Ceratocapsini:

- Ceratocapsus Reuter, 1876^{i c g b}
- Pamillia Uhler, 1887^{i c g b}
- Pilophoropsidea Henry^{b}
- Pilophoropsis Poppius, 1914^{i c g b}
- Renodaeus Distant, 1893^{i c g b}
- Schaffneria Knight, 1966^{i c g}
- Sericophanes Reuter, 1876^{i c g b}

Data sources: i = ITIS, c = Catalogue of Life, g = GBIF, b = Bugguide.net
