= Yoruba cuisine =

Foods of the Yorùbá people

Yoruba cuisine refers to the numerous and diverse foods of the Yoruba people of Yorubaland (Yoruba native regions of West Africa). Some notable Yoruba food includes Ọ̀fadà, Àsáró, Mọ́í Mọ́í, Ẹ̀gúsí soup, Àbùlà, Àkàrà, Ilá Alásèpọ̀, Boli, Ogi and Ẹ̀fọ́ rírò with Òkèlè. Yoruba cuisine has gained global acclaim outside of Africa with restaurant chains selling Yoruba food. Also on the global front are the fine dining Yoruba-inspired Michelin star restaurants like Akoko, Chisuru and Ikoyi in London that also serve Yoruba dishes. Yoruba food have also ranked among top best African food on TasteAtlas, including dishes like Ẹfọ riro, Ẹba, Moi moi, Jollof rice, Egusi, Asun, amongst others.

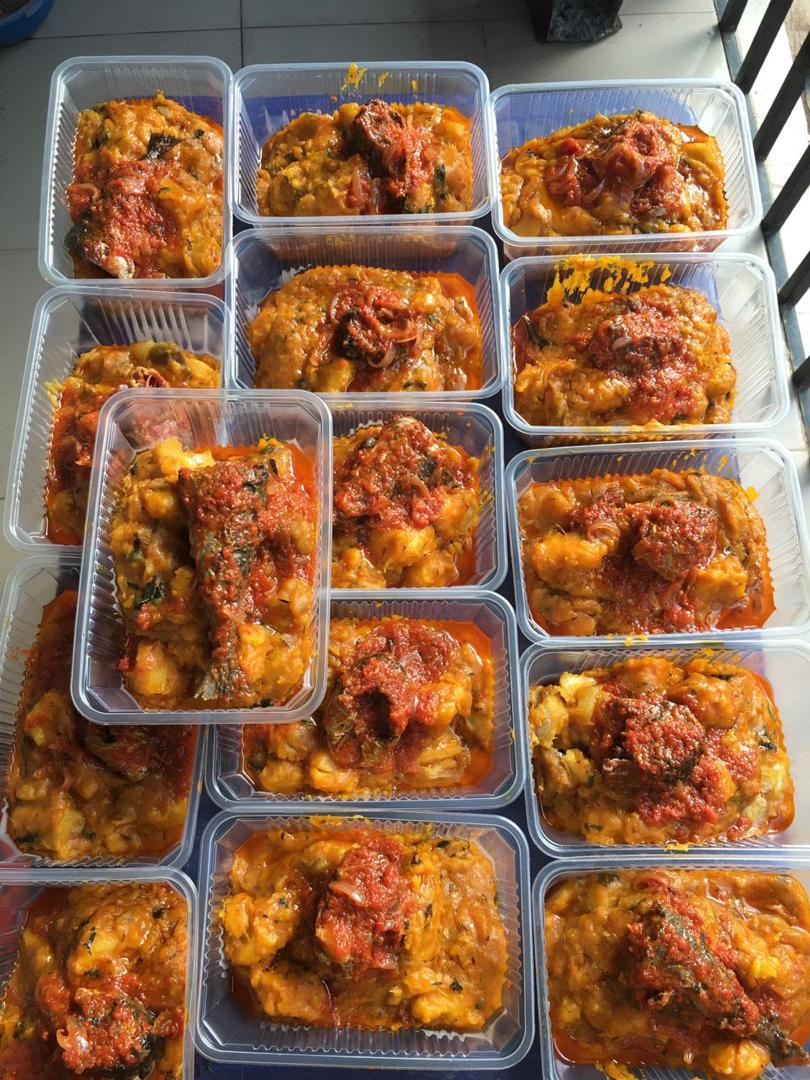
Asaro

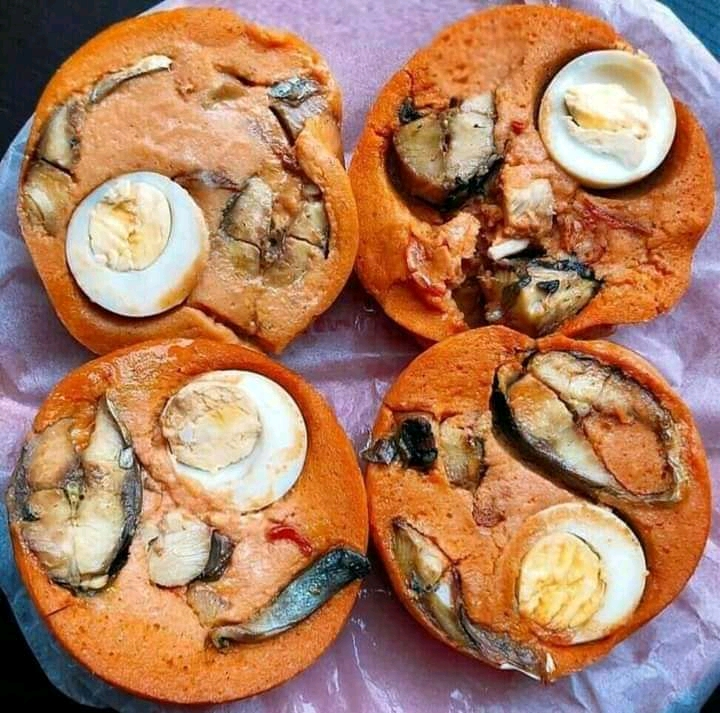
Moi moi

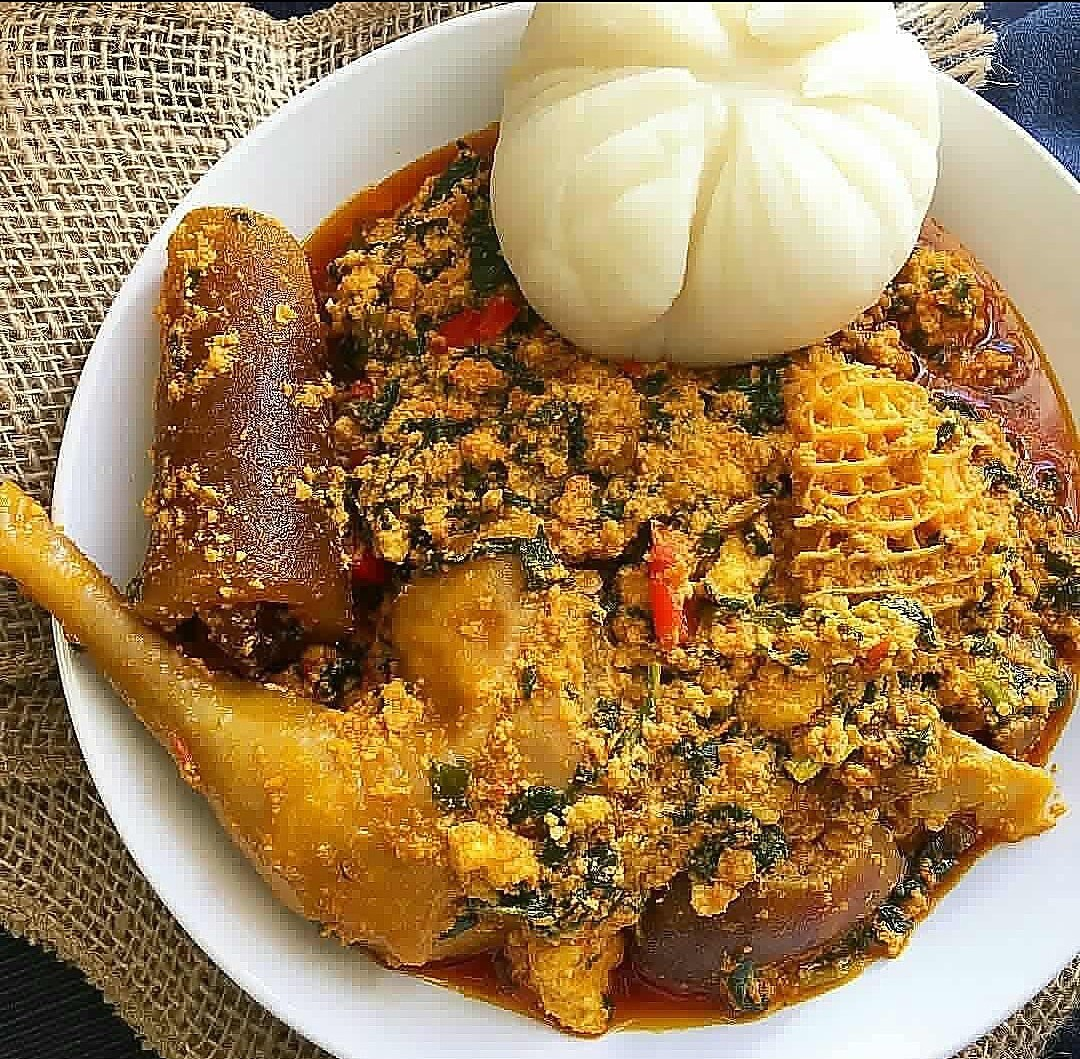
Egusi

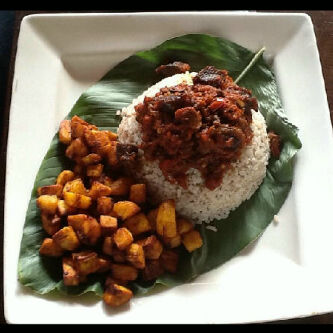
Ofada rice

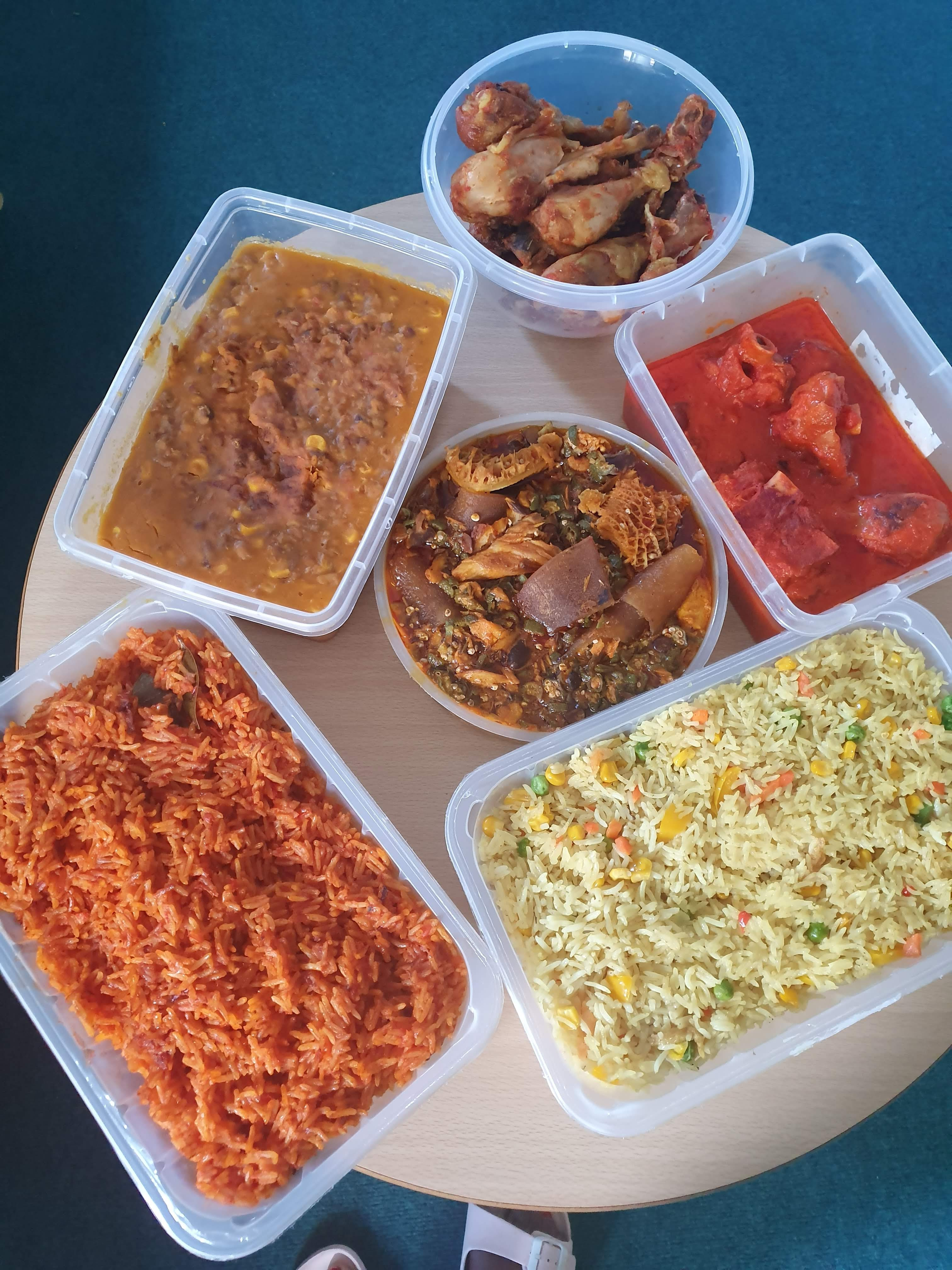
Some other Yoruba foods

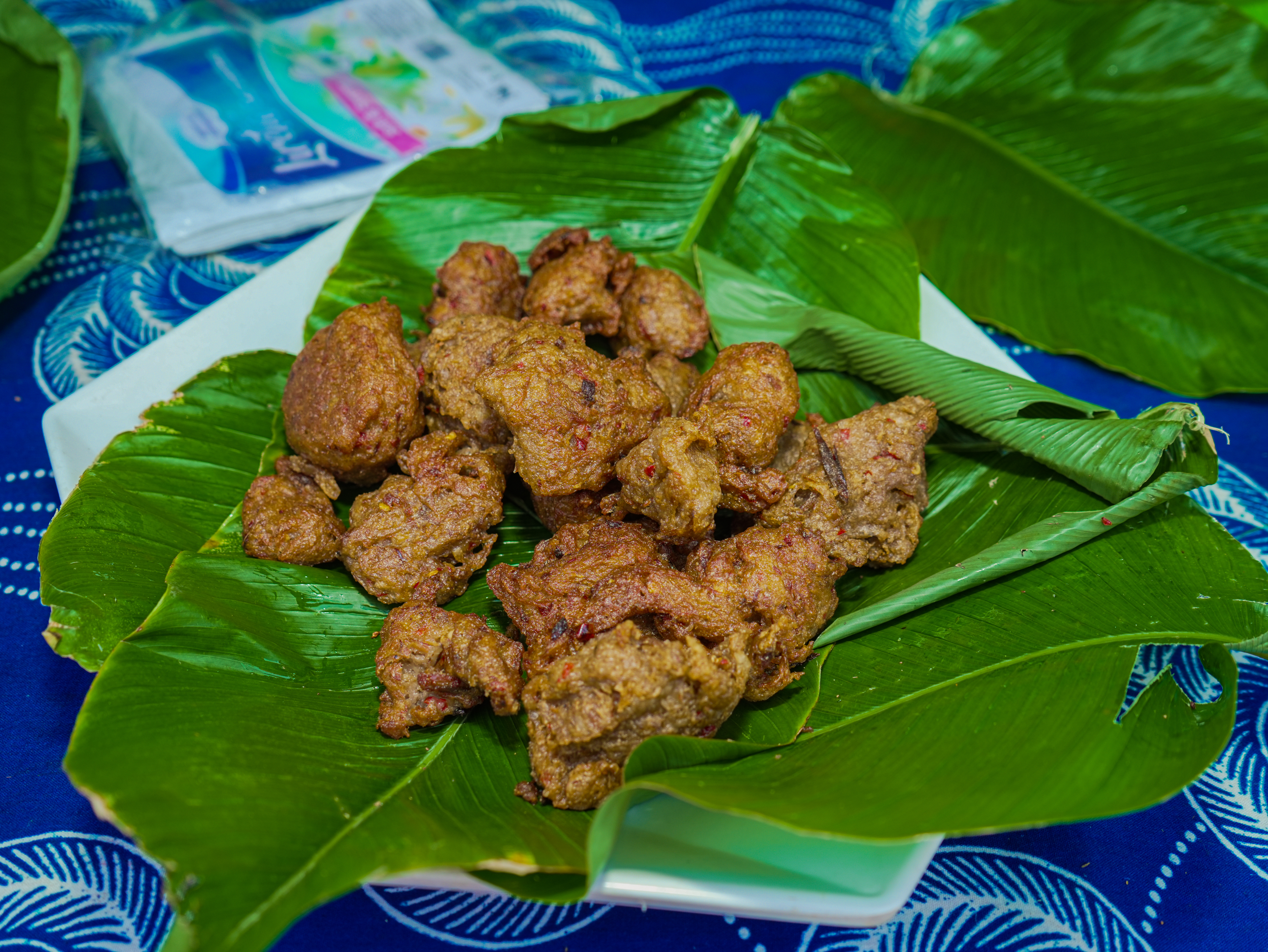
Sapala and Ate

== Yoruba food general list ==
Some Yoruba dishes:

=== Soups, Stews & Sauces ===
- Ayamase: Special stew that can be eaten with ofada rice
- Ofada sauce
- Obe Oniru/Designer Stew
- Shoko: A vegetable dish
- Efo (with Soko, Gbagba, Ebolo, Yanrin, Odu, Worowo, Tete, Gure, Ajefawo or Iyanaipaja vegetable leaves)
- Efo Elegusi
- Egusi: An obe (stewed or soup dish) made from egusi seeds, vegetables and other ingredients
- Egusi ijebu: A plain style of egusi made with no vegetables
- Ewedu Elegusi
- Ewedu: A vegetable soup
- Ilasa: A vegetable soup made with okra leaves
- Ila alasepo: A mixed seafood okro
- Ila ati obe dindin: Okro and fried stew (distinct from the one-pot-style ila alasepo)
- Obe ila funfun (with or without oil)
- Obe iru: Iru-flavored stew, obe ata variants
- Buka stew/Obe Ata Dindin: More intensely fried stew (with fish, chicken, beef, goat meat, snails, offals or other proteins that are usually fried too)
- Omi Obe Ata: More intensely boiled stew (with fish, chicken, beef, goat meat, snails, offals or other proteins)
- Gbegiri: bean soup
- Abula: Amala served with Gbegiri and Ewedu and Obe Ata
- Apon: A melon-seed soup made from oro also known as ogbono/ogbolo (as called by the Igbo people)
- Marugbo/Gbanunu/Obe Luku Soup (often eaten with Pupuru)
- Gbure Ologboro: Vegetable stew
- Ishapa: Stew or soup made from white hibiscus sabdariffa / white zobo
- Obe Eyin: Palm oil stew
- Egg Sauce: fried egg or scrambled with peppers, tomatoes and spices
- Imoyo
- Orunla
- Luru: Made with adding dried Baobab powder
- Kundi Stew: Made with dried/Tinko meat

=== Swallows/Solids/Morsel/Okele Foods ===
- Iyan
- Eba: Using garri (Cassava granules) in very hot water
  - Soaked Garri: Cassava granules in lukewarm or cold water (usually had with sugar and/or milk)
- Amala/Oka (also a component of the combination that make up "Abula")
- Lafun (also called White Amala)
- Fufu
- Ebiripo
- Pupuru
- Iyan Jaloke/Jaaloke
- Ekuru / Ofuloju: A corn based dish

=== Pottages ===
- Ikokore/Ifokore: A water yam pottage
- Adalu: A beans and corn pottage
- Asaro (food)
- Jaloke/jaaloke

=== Rices, Tubers and Legumes-Derived Foods ===
- Jollof: One pot spiced rice dish
- Ofada: Made from local rice blend eaten with ayamase or red lafenwa sauce
- Fried rice (Iresi dindin)
- Iresi agbon: Coconut rice
- Isu ati eyin: Yam served with egg sauce (usually fried egg or scrambled with peppers, tomatoes and spices)
- Isu ati obe dindin: Boiled yam served with stew
- Isu ati epo pupa: Boiled yam served with palm oil
- Esuru ati epo pupa
- Iresi Eyin: Palm oil one pot rice
- Iresi ati obe ata dindin: White rice and tomato-pepper based stew
- Ewagoyin: beans and spicy agoyin sauce that can be eaten with yam, bread or plaintain
- Ewa Riro: Stewed beans
- Anama / Odukun

=== Fried and Part of Mains Foods ===
- Akara: A fried bean cake
  - Akara olororo
  - Akara elepo / Akara Kengbe
  - Akara osu
  - Akara awon / dele
  - Akara senke
- Akara Ogbomosho: Akara chips
- Akara Egusi : Fried Egusi dough ball
- Dodo
- Gizdodo: Dodo (fried plantains) and gizzard meal
- Dodoikire: A candied dish made from ripe plantain, palm oil and pepper
- Dundun: Fried yam dish
- Dun Dun Oniyeri: Yam coated in an egg batter and deep fried
- Ojojo : Fried water yam fritters
- Yoyo: Deep fried small white fish
- Pekere
- Lapata / Ipakere

=== Pudding-based/Steamed Foods ===
- Moimoi / Olele: A steamed bean pudding
- Moinmoin elepo: Palm oil moi moi
  - Moi Moi Elemi Meji: Type of moi moi
- Abari/Sapala/Ekusu
- Ogi (also known as Eko mimu): A custard like dish made from corn, millet or sorghum
  - Ogi baba: brown ogi made from millet or sorghum or oka baba
- Eko: A solid Jello like pudding made from corn, millet or sorghum
- Eko Ada
- Egbo ati Ewa
- Alapa / Jogi : Steamed Egusi pudding
- Beske

=== Breads ===
- Agege bread

=== Snacks ===
- Puff Puff
- Buns: Deep-fried dry dough ball
- Asun: Goat meat barbecue dish
- Tinko Meat
- Igbin dindin: Fried snail
- Peppered snail
- Ponmo alata
- Boli: Grilled or roasted plantians
- Isun Sisun: Grilled or roasted yams
- Kokoro: Fried snack made from corn and has two types
- Kokoro Egba
- Guguru ati epa
- Adun: A corn snack
- Mosa (Plantain Mosa and Corn Mosa): Fried snacks similar to puff puff but with plantain, corn or other ingredients
- Ipekere: Plaintain chips
- Sisi pelebe: Peanut snack
- Baba dudu: Coconut candy
- Gurundi: A candied snack
- Agbado sisun: Roasted corn
- Agbado ati agbon: Corn and coconut dish
- Eekana Gowon
- Balewa
- Robo: peanut or melon-seed cake snack, usually ball-shaped
- Esunsun: Dried edible insects
- Warakasi: Milk curds or cheese

=== Drinks ===
- Zobo: A roselle drink
- Emu: Palm wine
- Chapman: A non-alcoholic drink, sold as a mix as well as different brands

== Introduced dishes ==
Food with Foreign roots now also made with distinct Yoruba style in Yorubaland. This is different from foreign food found in Yoruba regions, made as it is as it would in its native homelands.

Yoruba style:

- Small chops (Yoruba style samosas and spring rolls).
- Meat pie / Mince pie.
- Egg roll.
- Samosa.
- Doughnuts.
- Sausage rolls.
- Fish roll.
- Fish pie.
- Spring roll.
- Chicken pie.
- Shawarma.
- Scotch egg.
- Different pastries and cakes.
- Salads and coleslaws.
- Stir fried noodles.
- Stir fried spaghetti.

== Breakfast ==
Yoruba breakfast consists of a myriad of choice. Some food are more common for breakfast, lunch and dinner but it is also flexible to eat those meals at other times of the day as well if preferred. Typically breakfast can be different types of rice dishes, or Soups (obe) with "swallow" (Okele). Foods like Akara and Moi Moi can also be had. Some common Yoruba breakfasts include:

- Akara and Bugan (bread) with tea: Akara is a fried bean cake, it can be eaten alongside bread with tea sometimes included in the meal.
- Ogi with Moi Moi: Ogi is a custard like dish, Moi Moi is a steamed bean pudding that.
- Ofada: A rice dish made with native spotted rice eaten with either Ayamase sauce or Ofada sauce with meat or fish and/or egg. Dodo (fried plantains) can be added.
- Iresi ati Obe ata: Rice and a type of tomato-pepper spiced stew eaten alongside meat (beef, goat meat, chicken, turkey), egg or fish.
- Ila-alasepo ati Eba: An okro soup dish with Eba (a cassava garri based Okele).
- Isu ati Eyin din din: Yam and egg sauce.

== Lunch ==
Lunch has a diverse range of dishes just like breakfast. Some popular lunch dishes include:

- Obe Egusi and Iyan: Egusi soup and pounded yam with assorted meat (Eran) or fish.
- Ewagoyin and agege bread: A spiced mashed beans with agoyin sauce with agege bread.
- Jollof: Jollof rice with meat, fish, egg and salad or coleslaw with moi moi and dodo (fried plantains).
- Fried rice: A local style fried rice with the same side options as the above.
- Asaro: Yam porridge.

== Dinner ==
Like the above previous meals of the day, dinner is filled with variety of choices. Some examples of popular dinner meals include:

- Abula (Ewedu, Gbegiri, obe ata and Amala with meat and or fish): A mixed soup dish with different sauces and Amala.
- Efo riro with Iyan, Eba or Fufu: A spiced vegetable soup with proteins and Okele of choice.
- Obe Apon and Fufu: A nutty draw soup with Fufu (or any okele of choice).
- Iresi Eyin: A spiced palm oil rice.

== Snacks and side dishes ==
Some Yoruba snacks and side dishes include:

- Kokoro: A fried crunchy snack made from corn meal.
- Dodo ikire: A "candied" oiled and spiced mashed dodo snack.
- Asun: A spiced Yoruba grilled or smoked meat.
- Mosa (plantain and corn mosa).
- Small chops (small regional trays containing varying items; may include puff puff, buns, mosa, samosa, spring rolls, fish rolls, sausage rolls)
- Gurundi: Baked coconut snack.
- Shukshuk: Coconut candy.
- Sisi pelebe: Candied pounded groundnut candy.
- Baba dudu
- Coconut candy, pan-fried.
- Coconut flakes.
- Coconut clusters: Sugary coconut candy.
- Ipekere: Plantain chips.
- Pekere: Corn snack.
- Beske: Fried soymilk curds.
- Wara-kasi: Milk curds.
- Chin chin flakes: Fried or baked snack made with flour, sugar, egg, flavoring and other ingredients.
- Candied peanuts, pan-cooked.
- Balewa: A hard candy sweet.
- Eekana gowon: A candy.
- Aadun.
- Dundun: Fried yams.
- Dundun oniyeri/Yamarita: An egg-batter-coated deep-fried yam.
- Robo: Round snack made from melon seeds and groundnut
- Tanfiri: Round snack made from corn meal, groundnut and spices
- Eja yoyo - Small white battered fish.
- Eja din din - Battered fried fish.
- Meat pies.
- Rolls.

== Okele ==
Okele are starchy balls eaten in Yorubaland. They are also referred to as swallows. They don't have to be swallowed however or chewed as it is a preference. Okele include Fufu, Eba, Amala, Iyan, Lafun, and Semo.

== Soups ==
Soups are a staple of Yoruba culture. Some of these soups are what will be considered stews in the English language due to texture but are categorised as soups due to it being eaten with okele. Soups are eaten with okele. Soups are called Obe. Some soups include Egusi, Eforiro, Efo, Ewedu, Gbegiri, Marugbo, Apon, Ila, Ila- alasepo, Ilasa.

== Stews and sauces ==
Yoruba cuisine offers a rich variety of stews, eaten mainly with rice dishes but sometimes with yam, potatoes, bread or bean dishes. These stews are usually made with a tomato-pepper variants and onion base with spices including garlic, ginger, bay leaf, iru and so on, in a unique frying technique in groundnut oil/peanut oil (òróró) or palm oil (Epo /Epo pupa). Stew in Yoruba is generally called Obe-ata, but its also specifically a kind of common white rice stew. Some stews include: Ọbẹ̀ ata, Ọbẹ̀ ata díndín, Buka stew, Ọ̀fadà sauce, Ayamaṣe, Àgànyìn sauce, Ọbẹ̀ irú, Ọbẹ̀ Adìyẹ, Ọbẹ̀ Ẹja tútù, Ọbẹ̀ Ìmóyò. Stews are cooked with varying proteins like meat, fish, eggs, or sometimes snails. The meats are from usually from beef, goat, chicken or turkey. The cuts of beef and goat meats cuts includes:

Ogunfe : Goat meat cuts

Agemawo: Goat or Beef cut with the skin left on, often served in stews.

Tozo: The hump of the Zebu cattle, known for high fat content and tenderness.

Ijase: Cow shank or shin, often used for stews due to its lean texture.

Bokoto: Cow foot or cow leg, popular when stewed or peppered.

Ponmo: Processed cow skin, widely consumed for its chewy gellatinous texture and ability to absorb stew flavors.

Saki: Tripe or cow stomach lining, often called "towel".

Ori Eran: Head meat, which is fatty and tender.

Orun Eran: Neck meat.

Iru Eran: Oxtail.

Preserved proteins include like eja kika, smoked fish varieties which can range from softer to drier, as well as eja gbigbe referring to dry catfish to Tinko, dried cow meat. Dried shrimp, prawns and snails are also used.

== Drinks ==
Popular drinks in Yorubaland are Zobo (an hibiscus drink) and Kunu ( from Hausa), Ògùrọ̀ and Ẹmu (Palm wine). Tea, chocolate beverages, coffee and malt drinks are also enjoyed. Tea is typically preferred with milk and sugar. Chapman is a drink invented in Yorubaland that is also a common soft drink. Global beverages are also consumed alongside local variants as well.
