= Plantain =

Plantain may refer to:

== Plants and fruits ==
Plantain can refer to plants in three different families of flowering plants:

- Within Musaceae: Two groups of banana cultivars of the genus Musa whose fruits are normally eaten after cooking rather than raw:
  - Cooking banana
  - True plantains
- The family Plantaginaceae
  - In particular the genus Plantago
- Within Platanaceae: the genus Platanus of trees often known in English as planes

== Other uses ==
- Plantain Garden River, in Jamaica
- Plantain River, a tributary of the Gulf of Saint Lawrence in L'Île-d'Anticosti, Quebec, Canada
- James Plaintain (fl. 1720–1728), a pirate active in the Indian Ocean
- Plantain mosa, a Nigerian snack which is a component of small chops

== See also ==
- Banana (disambiguation)
- Fried plantain, a dish made from plantains
- List of banana cultivars
- Hosta, or plantain lily
