= Dundun oniyeri =

Yoruba yam dish

Dundun Oniyeri
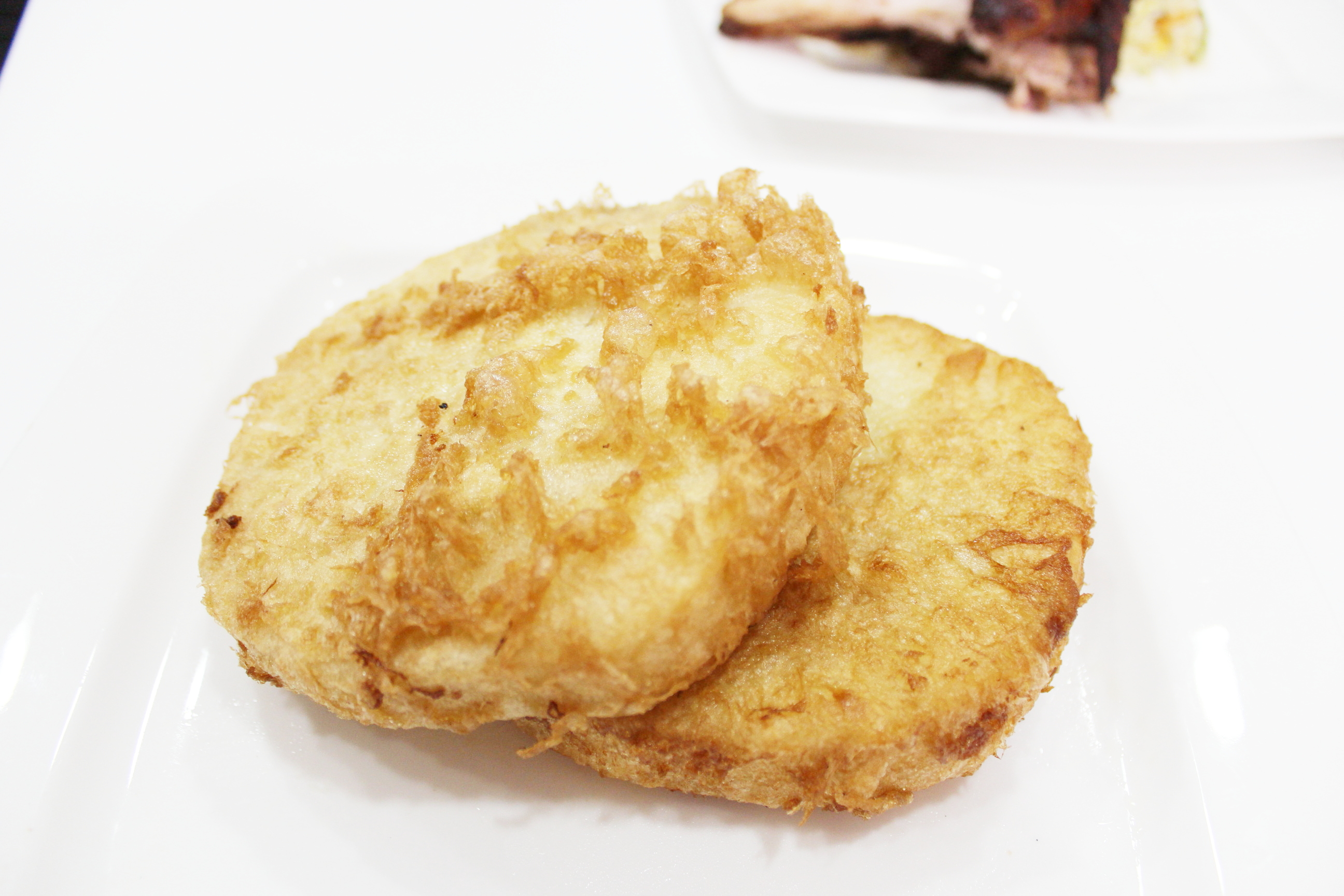
- Alternative names: Egg coated yam
- Type: Yam dish
- Place of origin: Northern Region, Nigeria, South West (Nigeria).
- Region or state: Hausa, Yoruba.
- Serving temperature: Warm
- Main ingredients: Yam; Egg; Flower; Vegetable oil

Dundu Oniyeri (Yorùbá: dùndú oníyẹ̀rì), also known as Yamarita, is a Yoruba dish made from egg coated fried yams. The yams are cut into thick slices, and a batter of seasoned flour is prepared alongside egg to deep the yams in. Cornflour can also be included. Sliced vegetables can also be added into the eggs. The yam is lightly cooked or parboiled. The yam is dipped in the seasoned flour, then dipped into the whisked egg batter then dipped into the flour again. It is then deep fried in hot oil. The food can be eaten alone or with tomato-pepper sauce or eggs. It can be eaten as a snack or a meal.

== Overview ==
The dish has been popularized by fast-food chain outlets such as Tastee Fried Chicken. There is also ongoing debate about whether it is of Yoruba or Hausa origin, as it is similarly prepared as "dunya" in some contexts and commonly sold as street food by mai shai (tea sellers).

It can be prepared with the following ingredients:

- Yam tuber
- Eggs
- Flour
- Ground chilli pepper
- Salt
- Vegetable oil
