= Gizdodo =

Nigerian cuisine made with gizzard and fried plantain

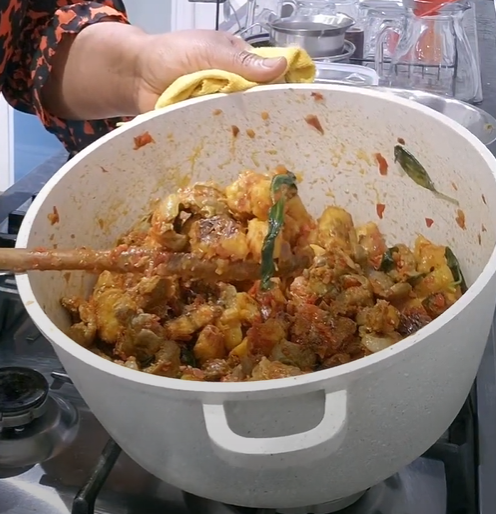
- Gizdodo
- Alternative names: Gizzard and Plantain
- Type: Traditional Nigerian dish
- Place of origin: South West (Nigeria)
- Region or state: Yoruba
- Main ingredients: Ripe plantain; Chicken or Turkey Gizzard; Tomatoes; Pepper; Onions

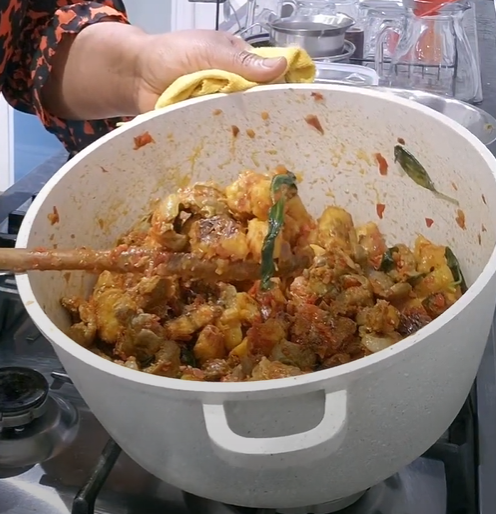
Gizdodo

Gizdodo is a Nigerian delicacy made of gizzard and dodo (fried plantain); this is a side dish eaten at home, picnic or for special occasions.

== Overview ==
The combination is made using plantain, gizzard of chicken, spices, onion, bell pepper and rodo (habanero pepper), amongst others. Carrot can also be added.

The plantain and gizzard are fried separately in a frypan; afterwards, the two are added to sauce made from the remaining ingredients (chopped onion, sliced pepper, spices, Maggi cubes, and other ingredients). Gizdodo can be served alone or eaten with rice or spaghetti. Gizdodo pairs well with a variety of side dishes, such as Cameroon Poulet DG, baked plantain frittata, Ayamase, and Nigerian Buns.

It can also serve as a party starter, similar to Asun. The type of plantain used in its preparation is important to the final result; ideally, ripe but firm plantains are preferred, rather than overripe ones that become mushy.

A serving of Gizdodo contains approximately 262 kcal, 34 g of carbohydrates, 24 g of protein, 5 g of fat (including 1 g of saturated fat), 307 mg of cholesterol, 177 mg of sodium, 948 mg of potassium, 4 g of dietary fiber, and 17 g of sugar, alongside other nutrients.

== See also ==
- Nigerian cuisine
