= Jogi (food) =

Yoruba steamed dish made from beans and egusi

- Associated cuisine: Yoruba
- Main ingredients: Cowpea; Egusi; Peppers; Onions; Crayfish
- Similar dishes: Moin-moin

Jogi, also known as Alapa or Igbalo, is a Yoruba steamed dish similar to moin-moin. The ingredients are primarily a blended mix of peeled beans, toasted egusi seeds, peppers, onions, and crayfish.

The ingredients are blended together and steamed in ewe eran, commonly known as moin-moin leaf. The beans are soaked and peeled before being combined with the other ingredients. The mixture is then wrapped in leaves and steamed until it becomes firm.

Unlike moin-moin, which is frequently prepared with oil, some traditional preparations of jogi do not require palm or groundnut oil. Jogi is either eaten alone or commonly served with other foods.

== Preparation ==
The beans are first soaked and peeled before being combined with toasted or roasted melon seeds. The mixture is blended with ingredients such as peppers, onions and crayfish. The resulting mixture is wrapped in leaves or other materials and steamed.There are different preparations ingredients and method of preparation varies. Traditional preparations use leaves such as Ewe Eran, while others use foil or other suitable food safe items.

== Consumption ==
A study of indigenous food consumption in southwestern Nigeria found that jogi was among the cowpea-based dishes consumed in Ogun State. In the study, 71.6% of respondents in Ogun State reported eating jogi weekly.
