= Baba dudu =

Yoruba coconut candy

Baba dudu is a coconut candy that translates to black or dark old man in Yoruba. It is also called sweet alagbon, meaning sweet coconut. It is made from coconut milk or cream and sugar. The ingredients are mixed and cooked till they change colour. When it is dark brown, it is taken off the heat. It is left to cool down a bit then rolled into shapes and sizes before it hardens. Sometimes salt is added in the recipe. They are among the culturally significant snacks in Yoruba cuisine and in Nigeria.
