= Obe ata =

Traditional stew/soup of the Yoruba people

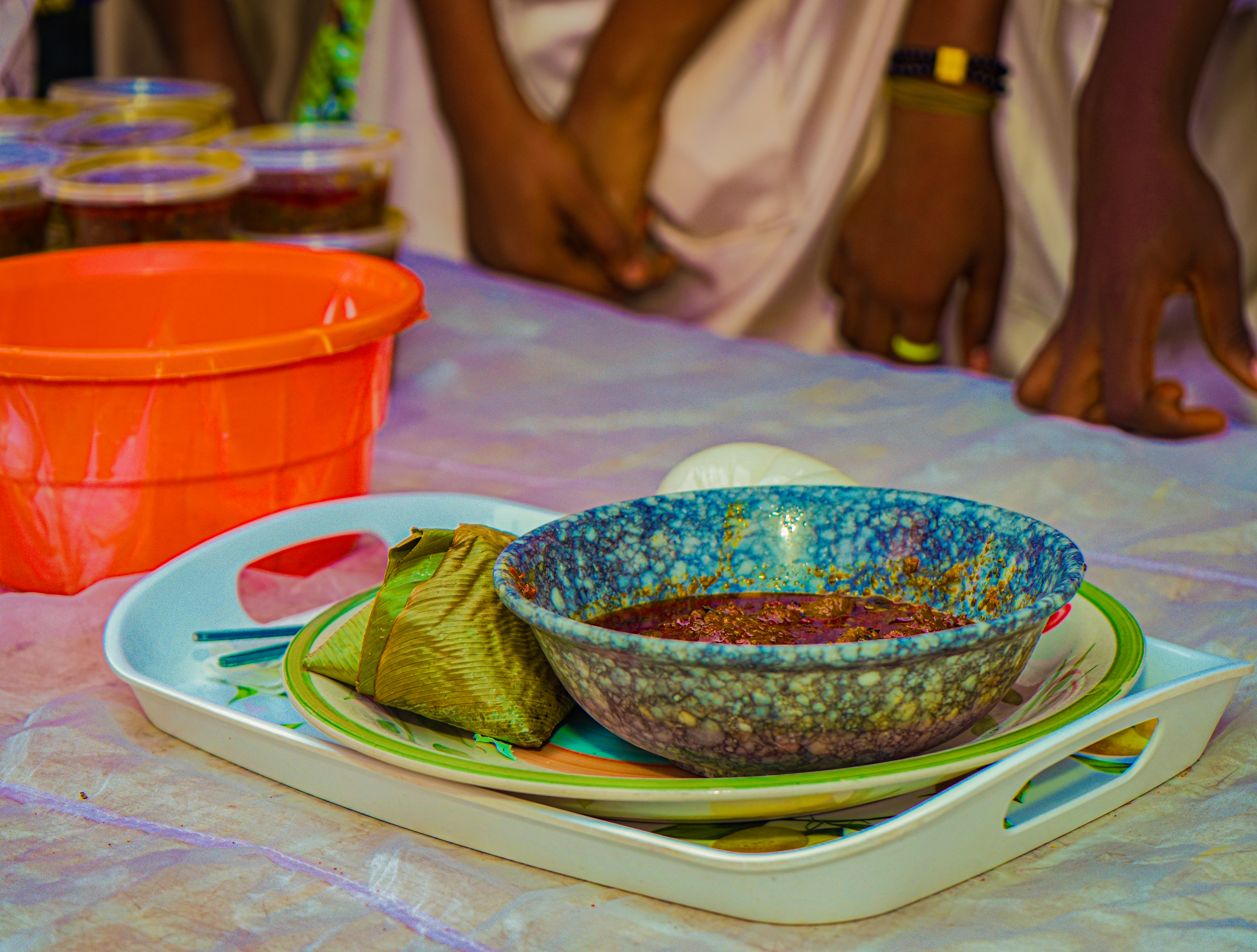
- Eko and Obe Ata
- Type: Soup
- Place of origin: South West (Nigeria)
- Region or state: Yoruba people
- Serving temperature: Warm
- Main ingredients: Fresh tomatoes; Red bell peppers; Protein of choice; Vegetable oil or Palm oil
- Ingredients generally used: Onions

Obe ata (Yoruba: Ọbẹ ata) is a stew or sauce used in Yoruba cuisine and meals found in Nigeria, Benin and Togo. In concept, it is similar to that of French mother sauces: a sauce from which other sauces are made, or to the Mexican mole. It can be used as the base with which Jollof rice is made, either at the initial or near prepared state. Plain cooked rice, yam and bread are also eaten with it. In Nigerian cooking the sauce is "ubiquitous".

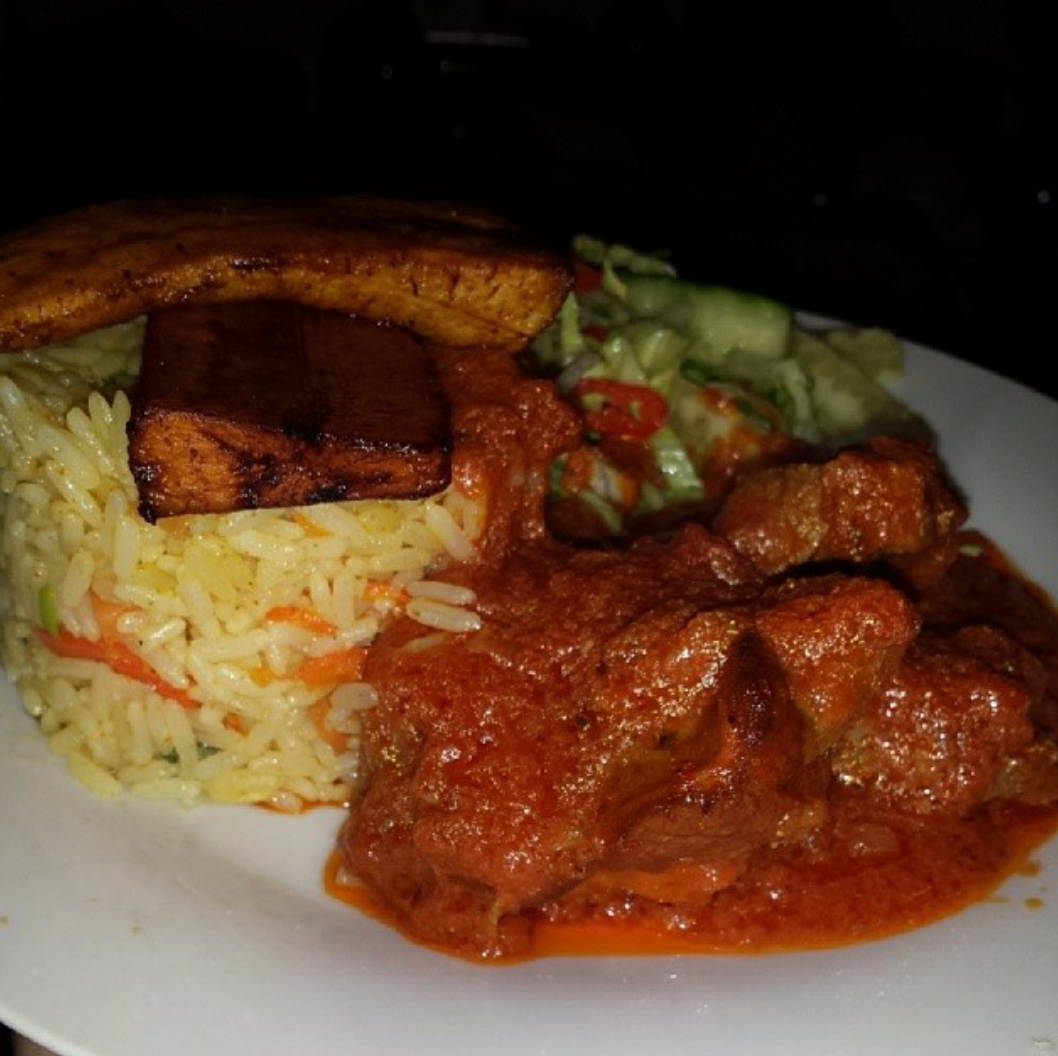
Obe ata with Nigerian fried rice and dodo

It is also eaten as a general stew or sauce with white rice (and other rice dishes) or as a dip for bread, yam, chips, or fries.

== Overview ==
Obe ata is made from tomatoes, a variety of peppers, onions, oil, stock and spices like thyme, garlic, ginger. Obe ata stews have several recipes that require iru as well, or bay leaves and curry powder depending on the flavour profile. Some recipes call for dried or powdered crayfish.

The tomatoes, peppers and onions are pureed together and then sauteed in oil, often groundnut oil or palm oil, depending on the flavour the cook is going for. Red palm oil, an unrefined oil with a sweet taste, is specified in some recipes. Spices and other flavorings are added as it sautees. The finished product is lightly spicy and savory. Most cooks use fresh tomatoes, some use canned and some use a mix of both. Some roast the tomatoes, peppers, and onions before pureeing.

A cousin sauce is ata din din (Yoruba) which is more a spicy concentrated stew. There are other Yoruba stews and variations as well, including ofada sauce/stew, ayamase, agoyin sauce, buka stew, and omi obe, among others.

Obe is also the general name for soups made from vegetables and seeds in Yoruba culture; some of these soups or obe will be considered sauces in standard English. Obe is usually eaten with okele but can be eaten with rice too. Some obe include egusi, efo, marugbo, apon, ila, ewedu, gbegiri, ila-alasepo, and ilasa.
