= Ikoyi Club =

Nigerian recreation club

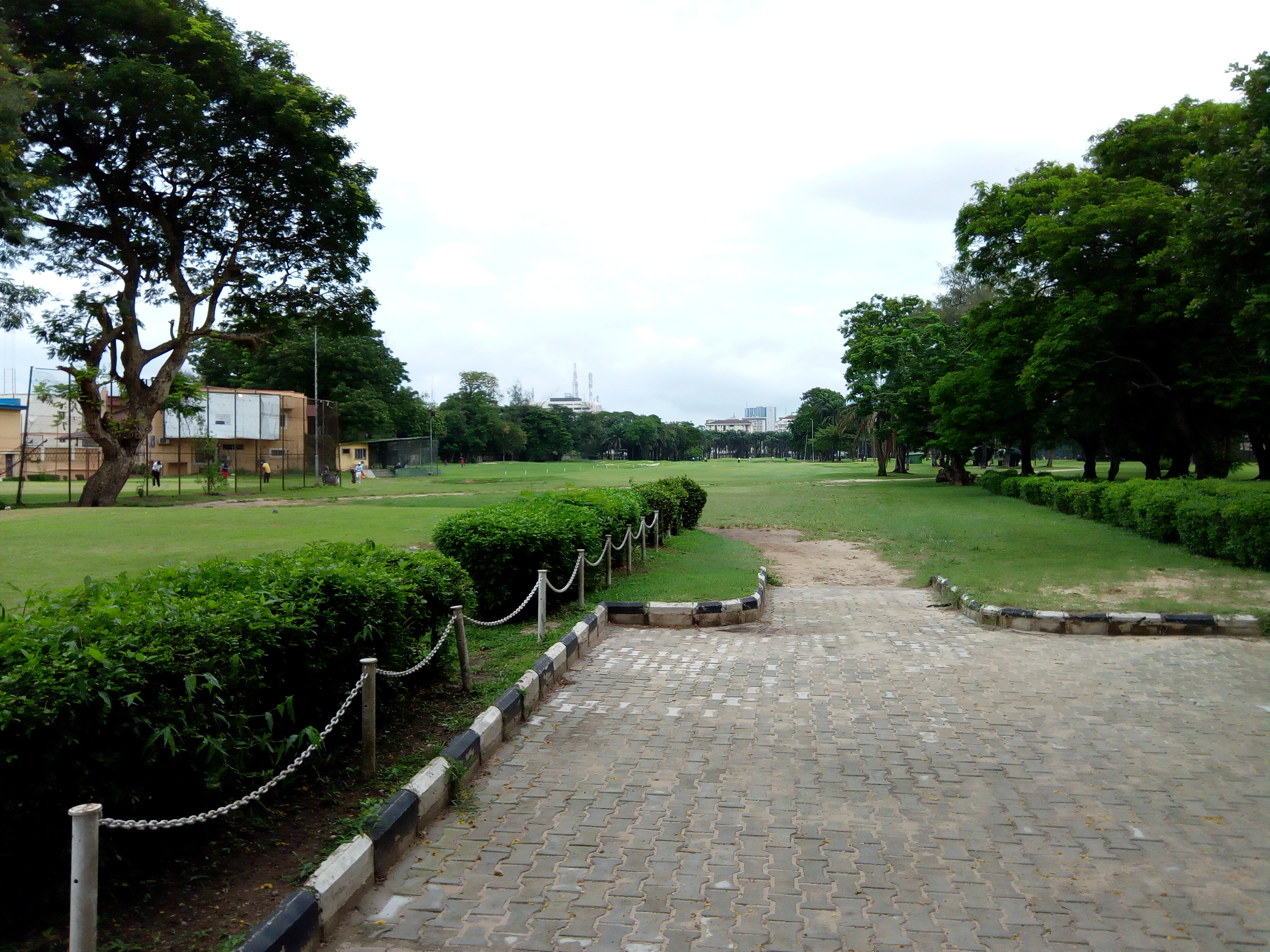
Golf course in Ikoyi Club

The Ikoyi Club was established as a European club in 1938 in Ikoyi, Lagos. It was originally converted from a prison to a rest house. It occupies approximately 185 ha (456 acres) of land. In the subsequent years, the European Club merged with the Lagos Golf Club. Besides the golf course, Ikoyi Club also has many sports and relaxation amenities which provide first class facilities for members and their families.

Today, the club has grown from its exclusively European membership to modern day membership of diverse nationalities. Some of Nigeria's most aristocratic families are now members.The slogan of the club is Global Harmony Through Recreation.

The present chairman of the club is Mr. Mumuney Ademola.

== Sections in the Club ==
The club is composed of different sections. These include:

- Golf
- Lawn tennis
- swimming
- Squash
- Table-tennis
- Badminton
- Billiards, Snooker and Pool
- Other Sports

== Amenities ==
The major amenities of the club included:

- Bars and Kitchens
- Library
- Barber's Shop (barbing salon)
- Gymnasium
- Massage and Sauna

== Other information ==
The cocktails and club sandwiches are rumoured to be among the best in the world. A famous cocktail amongst Nigerians and other drink lovers is called the Chapman. The recipe for it was created on the grounds of Ikoyi Club by Sam Alamutu, an executive in Ikoyi Hotel (a sister company to the Ikoyi Club) in 1938.
