= Aadun =

Nigerian snack

Aadun is a street snack popular among the Yoruba speaking states in Nigeria. The name aadun means sweetness and it is also commonly served at weddings and naming ceremonies.

== Overview ==
The four common ingredients used in making aadun include corn flour, chilli pepper, palm oil and salt. There are two types of the snack and they are: the pure cornflour and the moulded one rich in palm oil. The Okun people from Kogi State also add grinded beans to their corn flour before moulding with banana leaves to give it a unique taste.

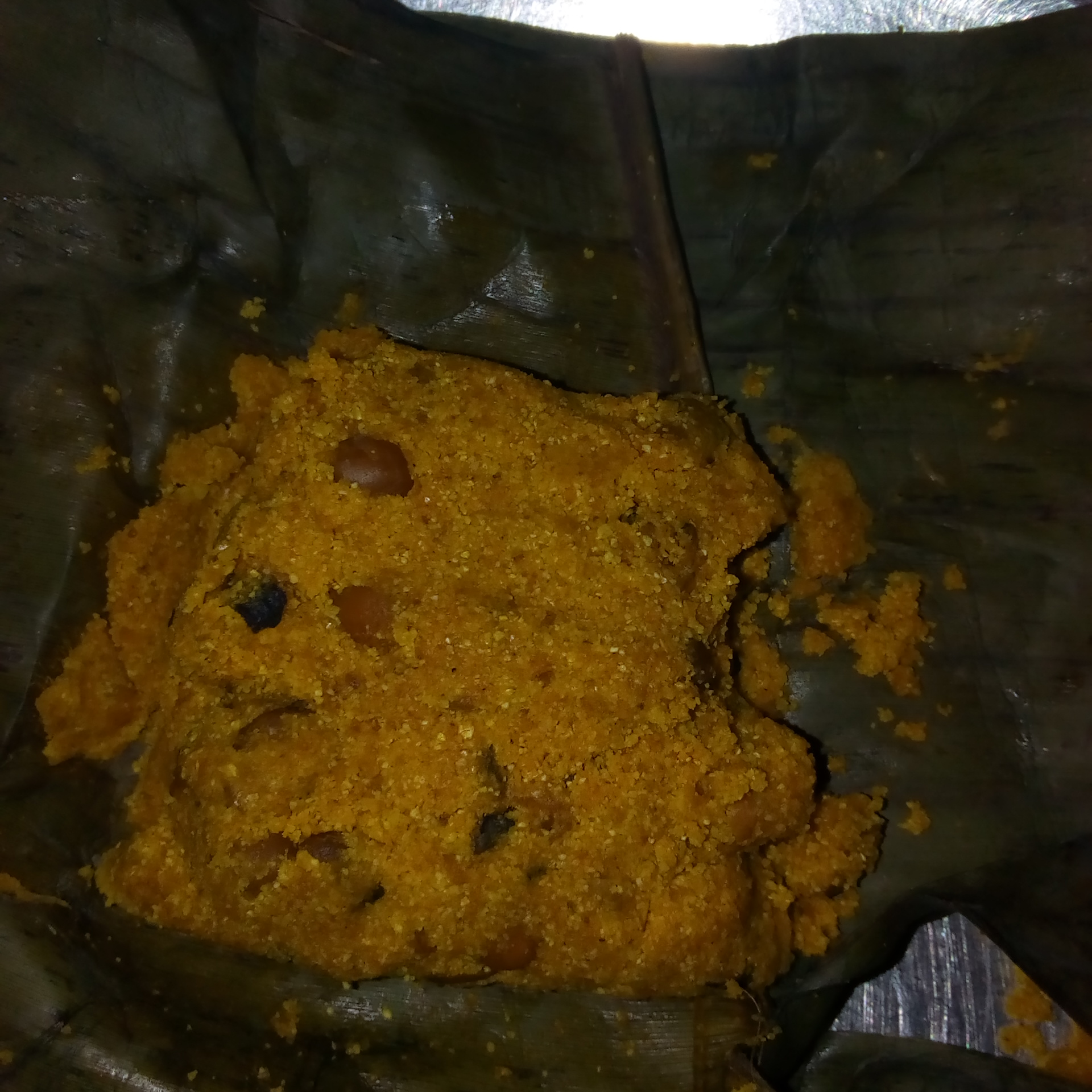
Aadun in a leaf

== See also ==
- Yoruba cuisine
- Nigerian cuisine
