= Dundun (food) =

Fried yam dish

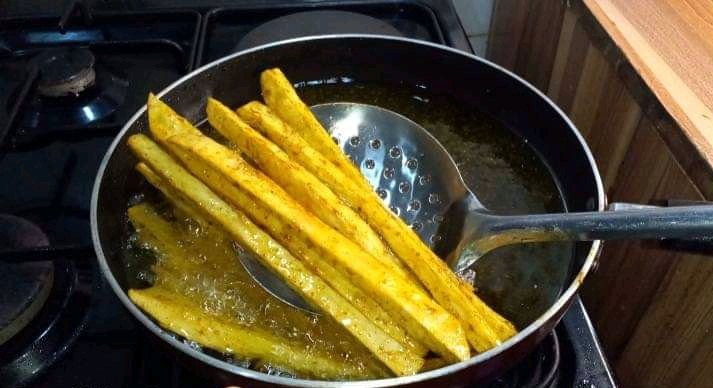
Dundun

Dundun is a deep fried yam snack among the Yoruba people. It is fried in peanut oil. It can be eaten as a meal at home or found as street food. It includes a dipping sauce of ata din din, a pepper sauce. It can include sides of battered fishes like eja yoyo, small battered fried fish with fried prawns/shrimps and eja dindin, a number of battered fried fresh and frozen regular fishes. Dundun is usually crisp on the outside. The yam is cut in thin layers before frying for extra crisp skin and edges. Dundun can also be sold with fried plantain and akara. Cocoyam dundun is made from cocoyam, it is also sold as streetfood, cocoyam is also made and packaged as cocoyam chips.

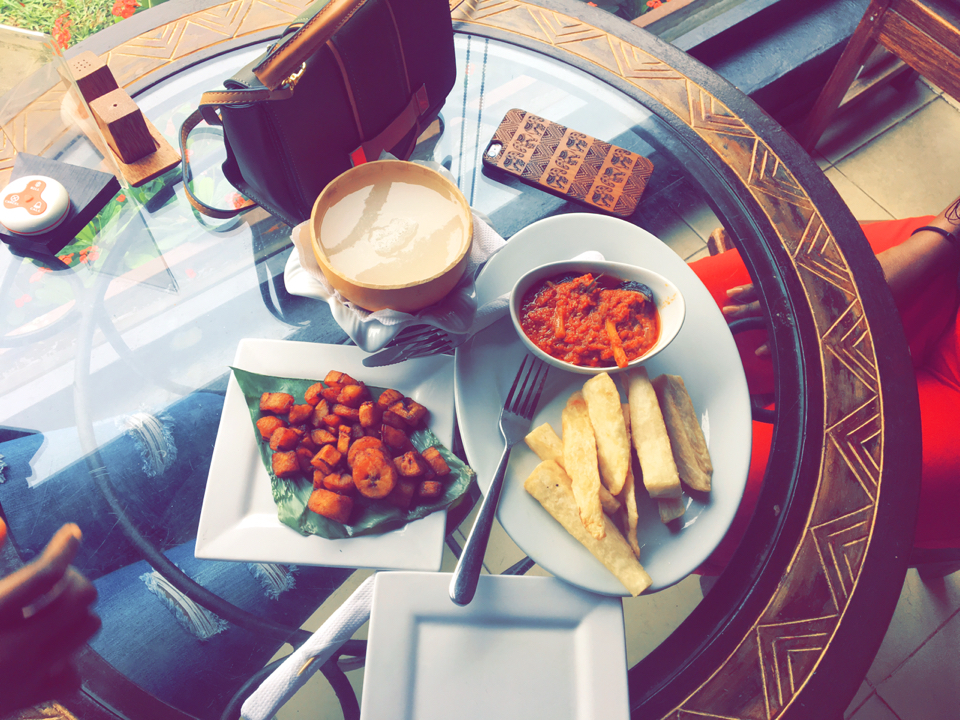
Dundun with Obe ata
