= Warankasi =

Nigerian cows milk soft cheese

Warankasi, wara-kasi or wara is a Yoruba local cheese in Nigeria. It is a soft white cheese made from cows milk. It can also be called wara, which is milk in Yoruba. It is similar to beske, except beske is made with soy milk curds and is a Yoruba tofu. Warankasi can also be used to refer to other types of foreign cheeses as a general name for cheese. Local warankasi is commonly sold as street food.

The cheese is produced by the coagulation of cow's milk with an extract of Calotropis procera, also known as the sodom apple. The cheese is traditionally sold in its whey or sometimes in a calabash, also known as bottle gourd, at room temperature.

== See also ==
- List of cheeses
- Nigerian cuisine
- Yoruba cuisine
