= Kokoro (snack food) =

Snack food in Nigeria

Kokoro is a snack food in Nigeria created by the Yoruba people. It is made from a paste of maize flour mixed with sugar and gari (cassava) or yam flour and deep-fried. It is commonly sold in Ogun State in Nigeria. There are two types, Kokoro (also Kokoro alata) and Kokoro Egba/ Kokoro abeokuta, the latter is usually round in ring like shapes and cream coloured.

In 1991 study of foods sold to school children in Lagos, samples of kokoro were bought from the stalls and subjected to microbiological analysis. Ten different types of bacteria were isolated, including bacteria associated with food poisoning and diarrhea, pointing to the need to improve control of hygiene in their preparation, and to look for ways to extend shelf life.

In a study that aimed to find a version with improved nutrition value, it was found that de-fatted soybean or groundnut cake flour could be used, but the taste and texture were not acceptable at more than 10% of the total flour. Another nutritionally improved snack derived from kokoro was developed by extrusion cooking of different mixes of maize, soybean and condiments such as pepper, onion, salt, palm oil, plantain and banana.

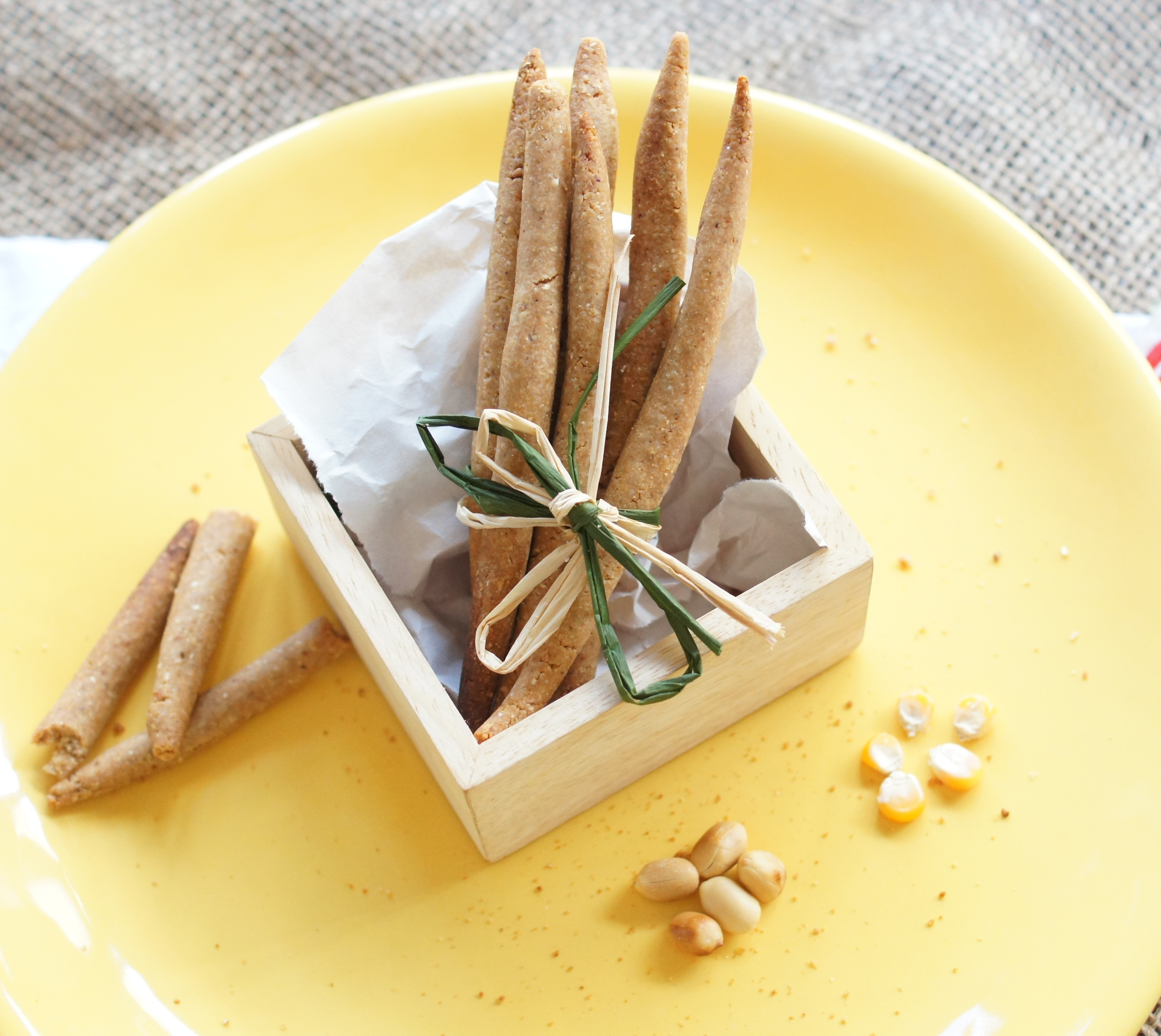
Kokoro

== See also ==
- Yoruba cuisine
- Nigerian cuisine
