= Ekuru =

Nigerian meal of the Yorubas

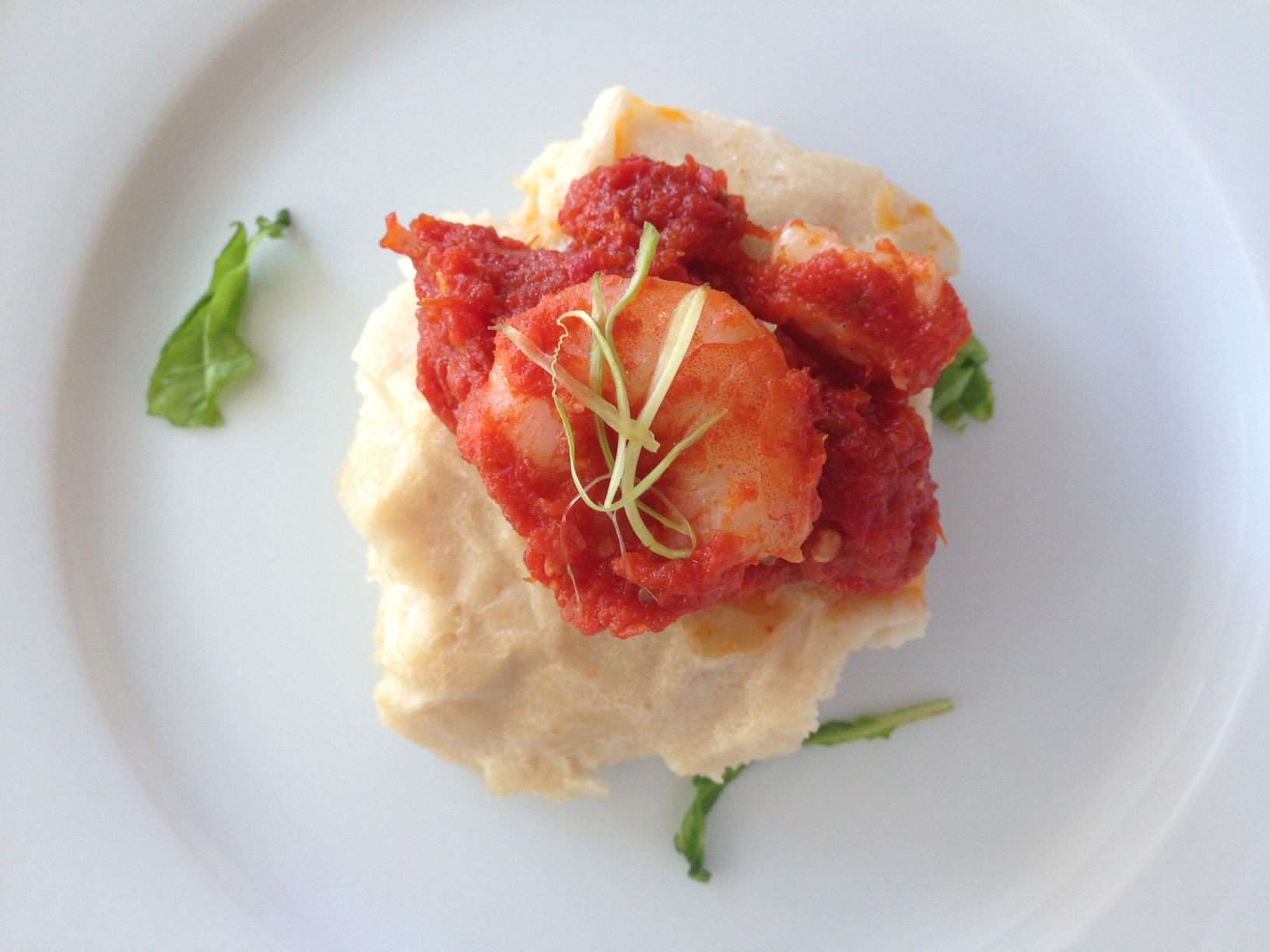
Ekuru

image of Ekuru

Ekuru is a cuisine native to the Yoruba people in Nigeria, Benin, Togo. It is often prepared with black eyed peas or beans.

It is similar to moin-moin another Yoruba delicacy made from black-eyed peas or cowpeas occasionally. The black eyed peas are first de-hulled, then ground into a fine paste. Unlike moin-moin which is ground with pepper, onion, and other ingredients, Ekuru is ground plain. After grinding and mixing till fluffy, Ekuru is wrapped up in leaves or tin cans (similar to moi-moi) and steamed.

It mostly has a white color, and is often paired with fried pepper sauce and solid pap (eko).

Some people enjoy the meal with fermented maize pudding (Ogi or Eko), and it can also be served alongside (Eba) Cassava Pudding or Okro Soup.

== In culture ==
Ekuru features in several Yoruba myths, where it is cooked with glue in an attempt to stop a cabal of evil witches from moving.

Because of the meal's dry nature, the expression "He chokes me like ekuru" can be used to describe a tedious visitor.
