= Ofada rice =

Heritage varieties of rice grown in southwest Nigeria

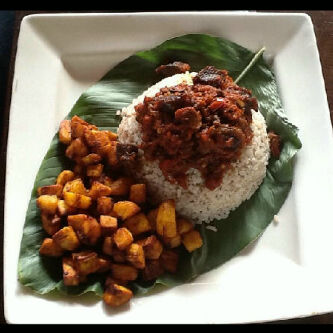
Ofada rice (upper right) served in traditional style with fried plantain and beef

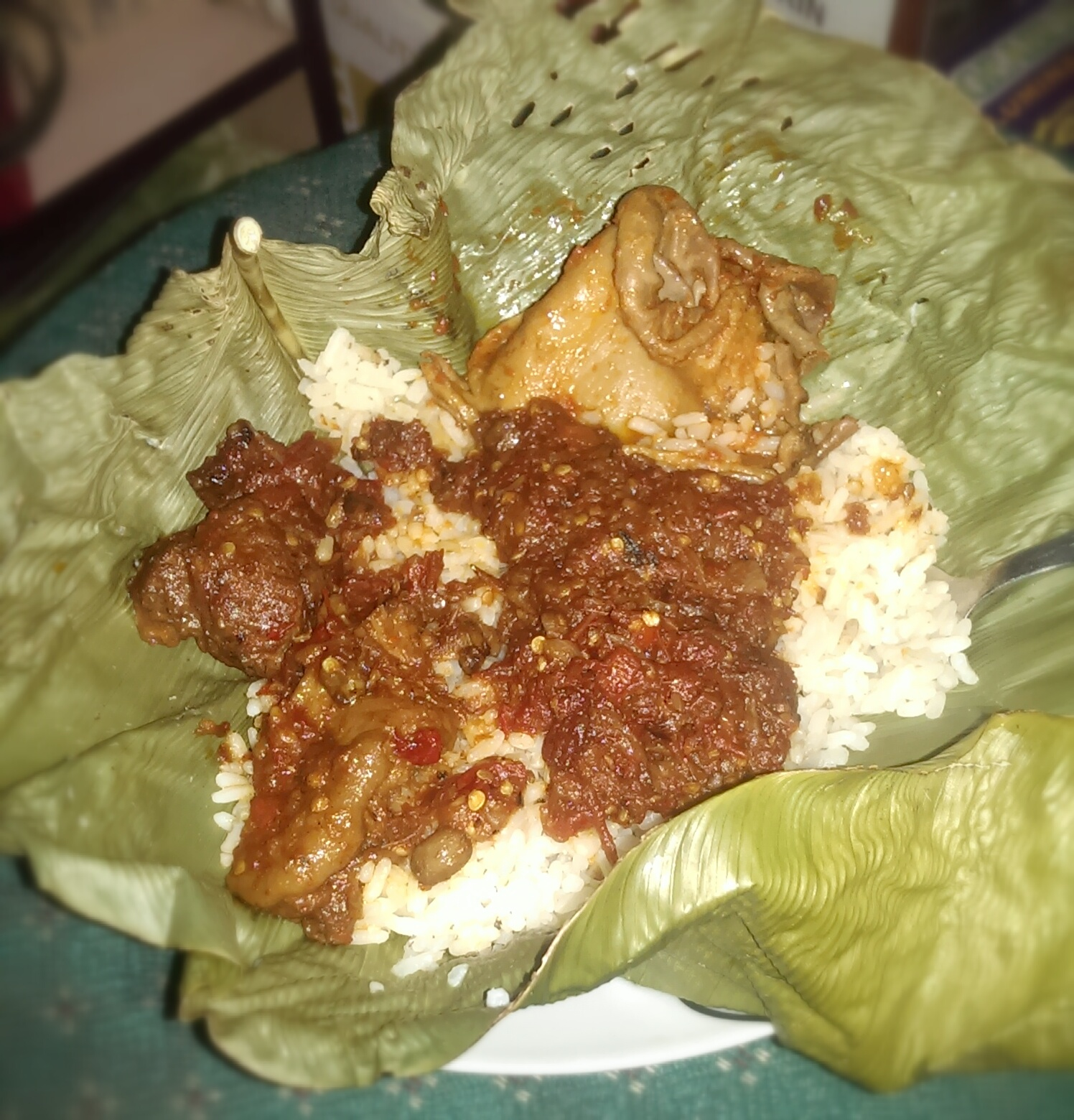
Ofada rice

Ofada rice is a Yoruba Nigerian dish. It is the name of an indigenous rice from a small community called Ofada, located in the Obafemi Owode Local Government Area of Ogun State. It is not exclusively grown in the community, but it is an indigenous rice grown in southwest Nigeria which is named after the Ofada community. It is used in making a variety of dishes. Ofada rice are mostly blends, and some of the rice varieties in the blends are not indigenous to Africa; however, they usually also contain African rice. It is grown almost exclusively in Ogun State, a state in southwestern Nigeria. Ofada rice is grown on free-draining soil where the water table is permanently below the root of the plant.

== Overview ==
Ofada rice are mostly blends, and usually contain Oryza glaberrima (African rice) as well as the more common Oryza sativa Asian rice, and may be categorized as either brown/red Ofada or white Ofada on the basis of unmilled seed colour. Grain size, shape, and shade vary.

Ofada rice is unpolished. As African rice is more difficult to mill and polish, some or all of the rice bran is left on the grain, which strengthens the flavour and increases the nutritional value. Brown ofada rice is often very highly aromatic, whereas white ofada rice is typically non-aromatic. They are also known for swelling in size when cooked. It is sometimes processed using fermentation, which adds an aromatic quality to the product.

Ofada rice is typically priced higher compared to other available rice, and it has been regarded as a sign of status symbolism by some people. In contemporary times, it is sometimes served at classy parties. It is also sold as street food by vendors, often pre wrapped up in Ewe Eran leaf, then served with the special Ayamashe sauce or Ofada stew with egg, beef, ponmo, chicken and or fish.

== History ==
Ofada rice is one of the major types of rice grown in Nigeria. This variety got its name from the fact that it was grown and processed in the South-West Nigerian villages of Ofada and other rice-producing villages. The crop was first grown in Abeokuta, Ogun State, and introduced through missionary activities between the 1850s and 1970s. From there, it was spread to the Lagos region in Epe and Okitipupa; from there, it was moved to Ogoja and Abakaliki provinces after the Second World War; and finally, it was spread across the Sahara and to northern Nigeria via the Trans-Saharan trade. The unique taste and aroma of the variety makes it more popular than other local varieties with distinct taste when cooked.

== Etymology ==
Ofada rice is named after the town Ofada, where its cultivation first occurred. Ofada is a town located in Ogun state.

== Preparation ==
Ofada rice is traditionally served in an uma leaf, with a sauce of atarodo (spicy) and tatase (sweet) pepper, onion, locust beans, palm oil, and meat. It is a festive meal rather than an everyday type of food for most Nigerians but it is an everyday street food for the towns of Ikenne and Ilisan in Ogun state. It is also often served along with a vegetable stew that may contain locust beans as an ingredient. It is often served with ayamase stew or obe-ata-iru, both specially prepared for ofada rice consumption.

== Ofada stew ==
Ofada stew is a local dish which originated from the southern part of Nigeria. Ofada stew is otherwise known as ata dindin.

Ingredients for making ofada stew are unripe habanero peppers (atarodo), unripe tatashe peppers or green bell peppers, locust bean seasoning (iru or ogiri), red palm oil, onions, crayfish, assorted meat and fish, beef, shaki (cow tripe), dry fish, and stock fish.

== Ofada sauce ==
Ayamase, also known as ofada sauce, is a stew made with palm oil similar to ofada stew except it is made from green bell peppers which give the soup a unique taste.
