= Ebiripo =

Yoruba steamed cocoyam pudding

Ebiripo is a steamed cocoyam dish common amongst the Yoruba people of Remo in Ogun state.

== Overview ==
Cocoyam is blended, wrapped in moin-moin leaves and cook until it's done. Ebiripo is best eaten with egusi soup or pepper sauce.

== See also ==
- Nigeria cuisine
- Iperu, Ogun state
