= Beske =

Yoruba soybean curds

Beske, also called Awara by some, is a type of soybean curd commonly consumed in Nigeria, particularly among the Yoruba people. It is a part of Yoruba cuisine. It is similar in concept to tofu. The basic ingredients for Beske/Awara are Soya beans, water and a coagulant. The coagulant can be alum or lime. It can also be fried. It is eaten as a snack and as a side dish. Fried Beske can be eaten immediately or stored for later. It is different from Warakasi which is made from milk and cut in similar shapes. However, due to its similarities, it is also called Wara Soya by some. Due to its ease of production, it is a common staple in many Nigerian households. Variants made with pepper are also called Beske alata. Additional ingredients can include grated carrots.

== See also ==
- Tofu
