= Sisi Pelebe =

Yoruba Nigerian peanut snack

Sisi Pelebe is a popular groudnut candied snack among the Yoruba people, whose name translates to "skinny lady". These are popular Lagos street snacks eaten in Nigeria. The main ingredients are roasted peanuts, salt and sugar. The roasted peanuts is processed through a food processor or blender, then the sugar is caramelised with a some salt mixed in. The peanut powder or chunks is added and mixed well. It is then taken off the heat, rolled with a rolling pin and then cut into shapes.
