= Asun =

Spiced Nigerian ethnic Yoruba barbecue meat delicacy

Asun is a spiced Yoruba barbecue meat delicacy from western Nigeria. It is a popular food eaten in restaurants, parties and even as street food. Asun is made from grilling or brolling goat meat, though other kinds of meat can be used, goat meat is the most popular for asun.

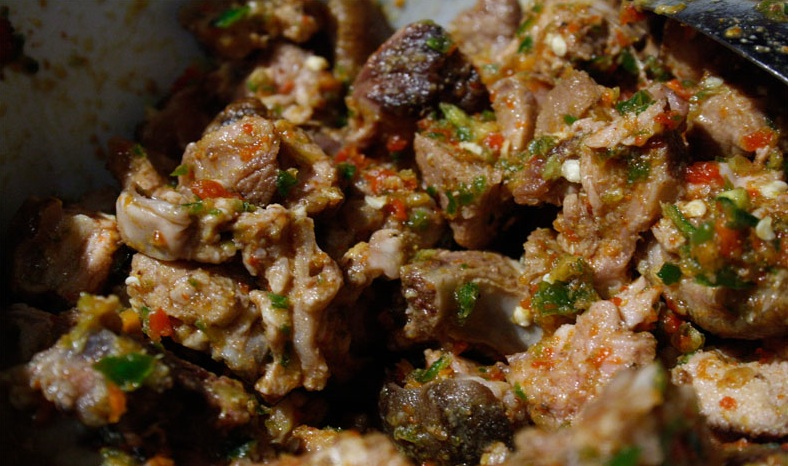
Asun

Ingredients used include black pepper, rodo, shombo, cloves, vegetable oil, green bell pepper, red bell pepper, garlic, ginger, smoked paprika and lots more. Asun is eaten alone and with a soft drink or with Iresi ati Obe ata (Rice and stew), Jollof rice, fried rice or Ofada rice as a side dish.
