= Boli (plantain) =

Roasted plantain dish in Nigeria of the Yorubas

Boli/Bole
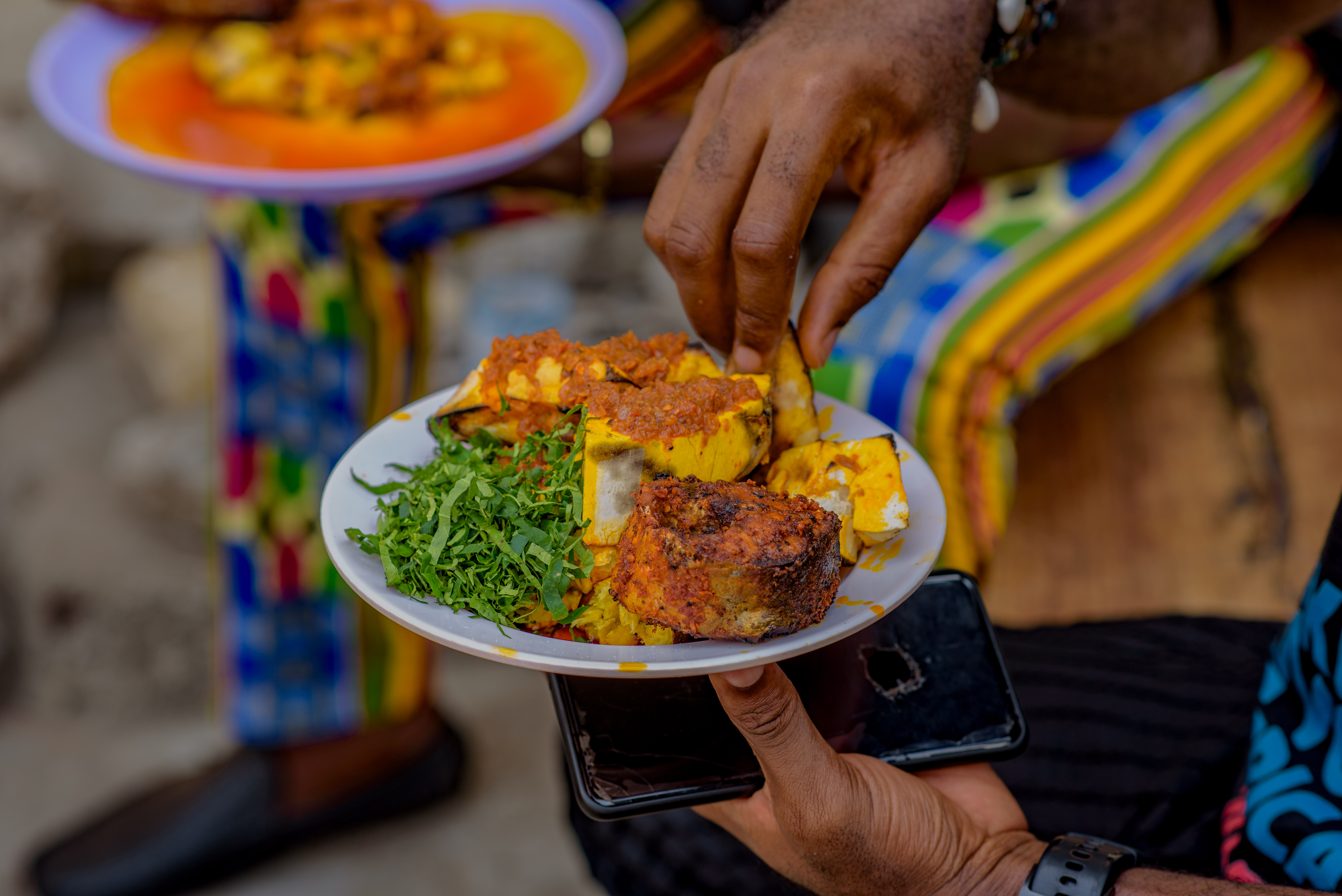
- Boli/Bole
- Type: Plantain Dish
- Place of origin: Nigeria
- Region or state: Southern Nigeria
- Main ingredients: Half-ripe plantain; Groundnut; Palm oil; Utazi; Fish

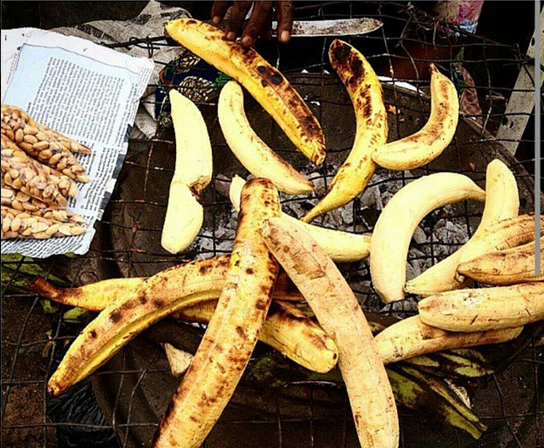
Boli roasting in Nigeria

Boli (also known as Bole) is a roasted plantain snack or meal in Nigeria. It is native to the Yoruba people of Nigeria, but is also eaten by their neighbours in Rivers State, due to acculturation. It is referred to as 'boli' by Yoruba people inhabiting South West Nigeria, and is eaten with groundnuts.

== Overview ==
It can be consumed as a snack or main meal, accompanied with pepper sauce and filled with meat, roasted fish or fried chicken especially during the festive period, especially in Rivers State. The word 'boli' is pronounced as 'bole' due to a difference in accent in the south-south region in Nigeria. In South South Nigeria, it is called 'bole' and is eaten with roasted fish. Bole went from being eaten at festivals to becoming a very popular street food. Originally it consisted of a roasted half ripe plantain and hot spicy sauce (made from palm oil, pepper and utazi leaves), however roasted potatoes and yam are now part of the dish. Aside from originating and being a popular dish in Yorubaland, it is slowly becoming a staple food at homes of Rivers State people.

== Recipe ==
Beyond the popular boli and groundnut combination, Port Harcourt-style bole and fish is prepared with the following ingredients:

- Plantains (Unripe or Ripe Plantain)
- Mackerel fish
- Salt
- Pepper
- Palm oil
- Pepper
