= Plantain mosa =

Nigerian snack

Plantain mosa is a Nigerian snack popular among the Yoruba people, which is a component of small chops. Other components of small chops include grilled chicken, spring roll, samosa and puff-puff.

Mosa is similar to the Ghanaian tatale except that it is made with over-ripe plantain, eggs and flour, while tatale is made with plantain, ginger and spices. Puff-puff and mosa are also similar except that mosa has the taste of plantain.

Some other ingredients used in making plantain mosa include onion, vegetable oil, bonnet pepper and yeast. The mashed plantain is deep-fried until brown alongside other ingredients; mosa can also be eaten as breakfast.

== See also ==
- Nigerian cuisine
- True plantains
