= Dodo ikire =

Yoruba traditional delicacy

Dodo ikire is a Yoruba traditional delicacy from Ikire in Osun State, Nigeria. It was originally made from leftover plantain but today, people prepare it from fresh ingredients which are: over-ripe plantains, pepper, oil and salt. Dodo ikire is black and round or conical in shape.

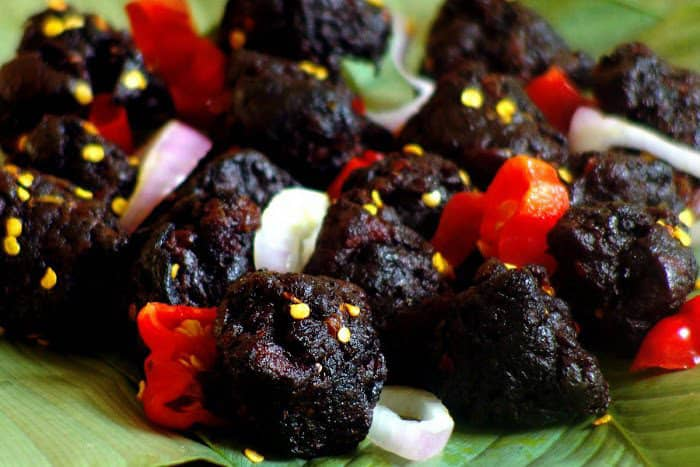
Picture attachment on a post about Dodo Ikire

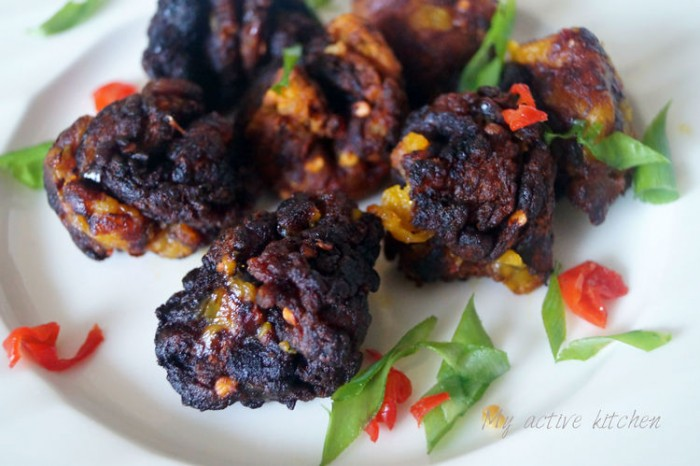
Picture of Dodo Ikire served by a Food Blogger.

Legend has it that dodo ikire was created as an experiment by an old lady from the town Ikire. Ikire is a town in the South-western area of Nigeria between the cities of Ibadan and Ile-Ife, in Osun State. This old lady supposedly had no food left except the over-ripe plantains, which she would have normally throw in the bin, but she decided to mash it all up with some salt and pepper and deep-fry it in palm oil. She ate it, enjoyed it and decided to make more and share with her neighbours.
