= Corn Mosa =

Yoruba fried corn-based fritter

Corn Mosa is a Yoruba fritter made from corn. One of the oldest cookbooks which mentioned Mosa was the Kudeti book of Yoruba cookery, first published in 1934. In William Bascom‘s January 1951 Yoruba Food paper in Africa: Journal of the International African Institute, he mentions the corn fritter dish of the Yoruba. It was also called Massa and compared with Akara-lapata. Lapata, another Yoruba dish, was called a corn cake in the 1852 book A Vocabulary of the Yoruba Language. Corn Mosa is popular as a street snack in South West Nigeria.

== Preparation and ingredients ==
Dried corn kernels or soaked grits, sugar, yeast, salt, nutmeg, onion and oil for frying

Corn kernels are soaked for hours. It is ground with water till smooth.The excess water is strained via cloth, till a thick pulp is gotten. Nutmeg, sugar, salt, yeast are all added and mixed in. The yeast is left to rise before frying. In a hot oil, onion chunk is added for flavoring the oil then scoops of batter using a spoon is monitored and fried until golden brown.
