= Small chops (food) =

Nigerian platter snack

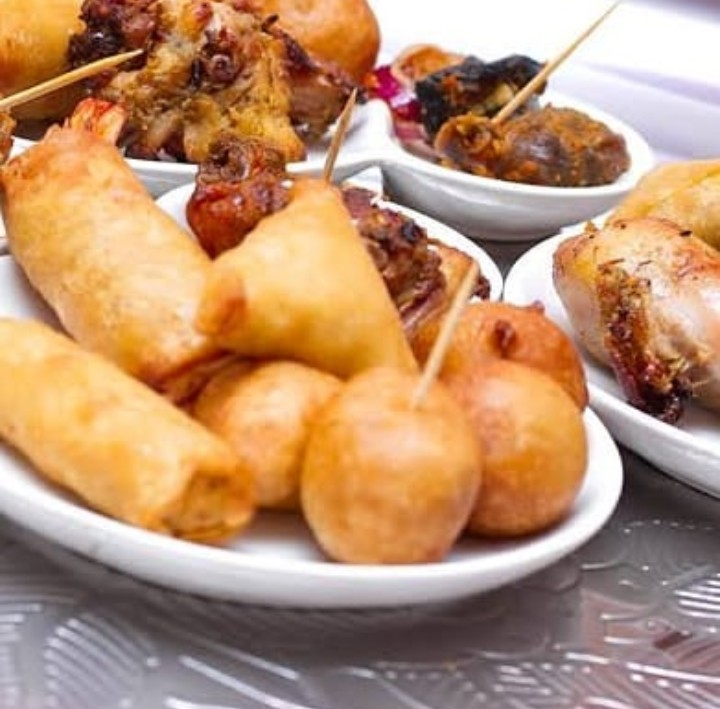
- Type: Finger food/ Appetiser
- Place of origin: Nigeria
- Region or state: West Africa
- Serving temperature: Hot or warm
- Main ingredients: Puff-puff, Samosa, Spring roll, Peppered meat/ chicken
- Similar dishes: Hors d'oeuvres, canapés, dim sum

Small chops is a popular Nigerian platter of bite-sized finger foods often served as an appetiser before the main meal at social gatherings in Nigeria and across West Africa. Small chops consist of an assortment of both indigenous Nigerian and International snacks, including puff-puff, spring rolls, samosa, and peppered meat or chicken.

== History ==
The term "small chops" is a Nigerian English phrase combining the British colonial slang word "chops" meaning food or a light meal with the adjective "small" to indicate bite-sized portions. The phrase is widely understood across English-speaking West Africa.

The small chops tradition is reported to have existed in Nigeria in some form since at least the 1950s, with its roots traceable to the British colonial era. Early versions of the platter were simpler, consisting of indigenous items like puff-puff, chin-chin, battered fish, mini sausage rolls, and peppered gizzards.

The modern composition of small chops now includes snacks from different cultures. The inclusion of samosa, a snack which originated from India, is said to have come from the presence of Indian expatriate communities in Nigeria during the oil boom era of the 1970s when Indians established stores that stocked Indian delicacies. Similarly, spring roll, which originates from China was introduced in the late 1970s when the Chinese were providing huge catering resources, supplying homes and hotels, introducing Chinese cuisine to Nigeria

By the late 20th century, these international cuisines had become a standard component of the small chops platter.

Small chops play a central role in Nigerian owambe party culture. They are typically served as appetisers before the main meal arrives, often signifying the official start of festivities. The quality and variety of the small chops platter depends solely on the event or financial capabilities of the host.

Small chops are served at a wide variety of social gatherings including weddings, birthday parties, naming ceremonies, graduations and corporate events. They are sometimes served alongside zobo, cocktails, or soft drinks.

== Composition ==
- Puff-puff - a traditional snack made of fried dough, widely considered the most beloved item in any small chops pack.
- Spring roll - originally from China, stir-fried vegetable filling wrapped in a thin wafer and deep-fried to a crisp golden brown commonly found in Southeast Asian cuisines
- Samosa - a triangular fried pastry filled with spiced potatoes, peas and minced beef
- Chin-chin - a snack made of dough containing flour, sugar, butter, and milk. Optional ingredients include eggs, sugar, lemon/lime zest, orange
- Asun - spiced Yoruba barbecue meat delicacy
- Suya - is a traditional Hausa smoke-grilled spiced meat on skewer
