= Chapman (drink) =

Non-alcoholic beverage from Nigeria

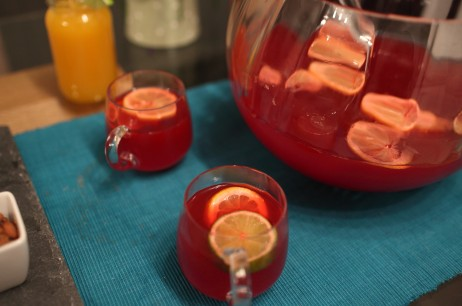
Chapman served in a punch bowl

Chapman, or shapman, is a non-alcoholic drink originating from Nigeria. Often referred to as a non-alcoholic punch, it is traditionally made with a mix of Fanta, Sprite, cucumber, lemon, grenadine and Angostura bitters and served in a large mug with ice and a few slices of cucumber. It is often described as Nigeria's favourite drink and though predominantly served without alcohol, it can also be served with a hint of vodka or rum.

== History ==
It is believed that the cocktail originated at a local bar in Ikoyi Club, Lagos, Nigeria. The drink was created by Samuel Alamutu, a Yoruba bartender at the country club who was asked to make something special for his favourite customer named Chapman.

Chapman is probably Nigeria's most famous and favourite drink; served in many bars, clubs, restaurants and special occasions in the country; and growing more popular across West Africa.

== Ingredients and variations ==
Unlike its non-alcoholic counterpart, mocktail, Chapman falls into the cocktail category due to the inclusion of Angostura aromatic bitters. Comprising carbonated orange and lemon or lime drinks, grenadine syrup, fruit juice, ice cubes, and other garnishes, this unique concoction is a highlight at many events.

While there is no approved standard recipe, a Chapman drink will always include bitters, lemon, lime and cucumber.

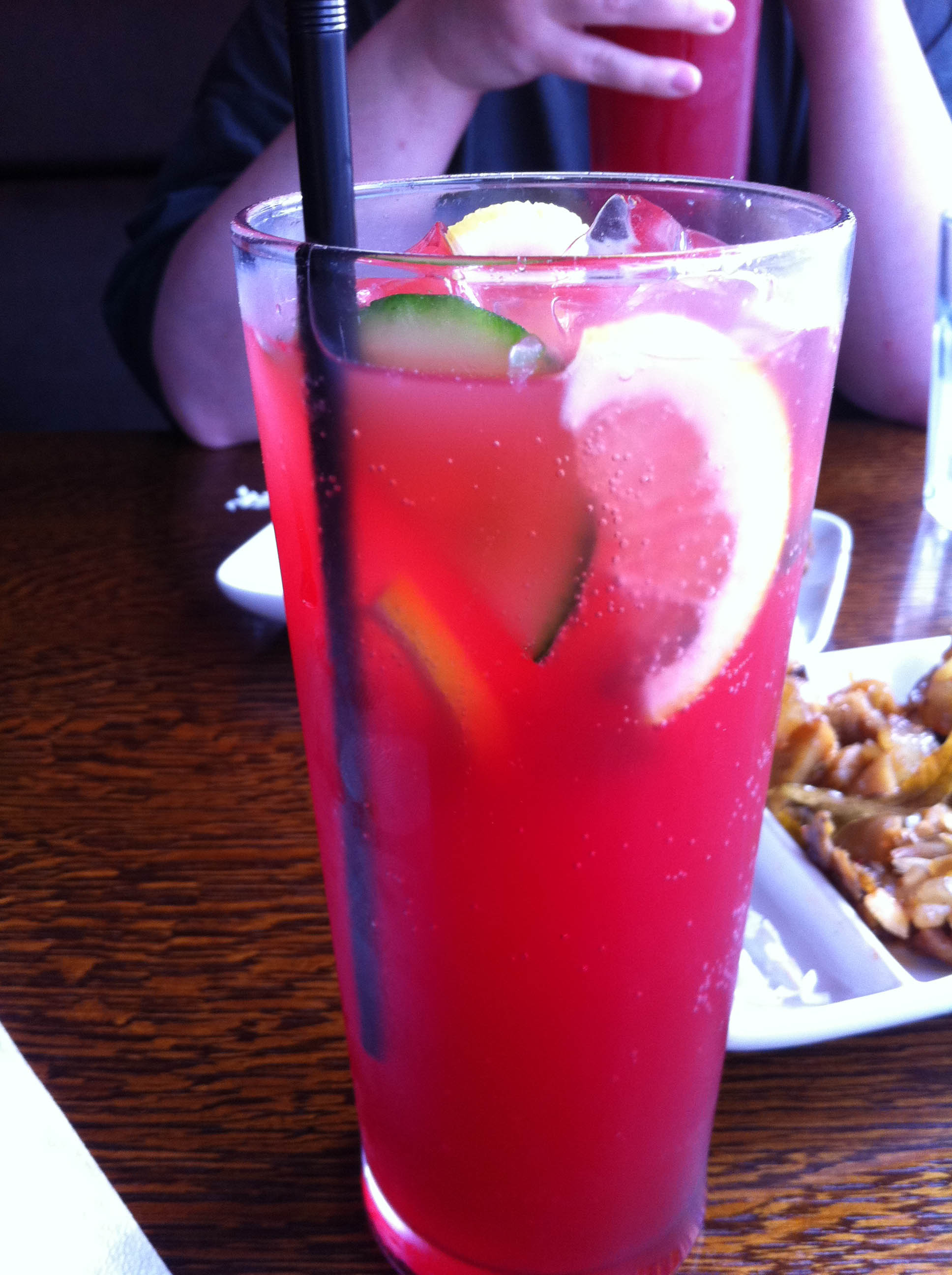
Chapman served in a glass with ice, cucumber, and lemon

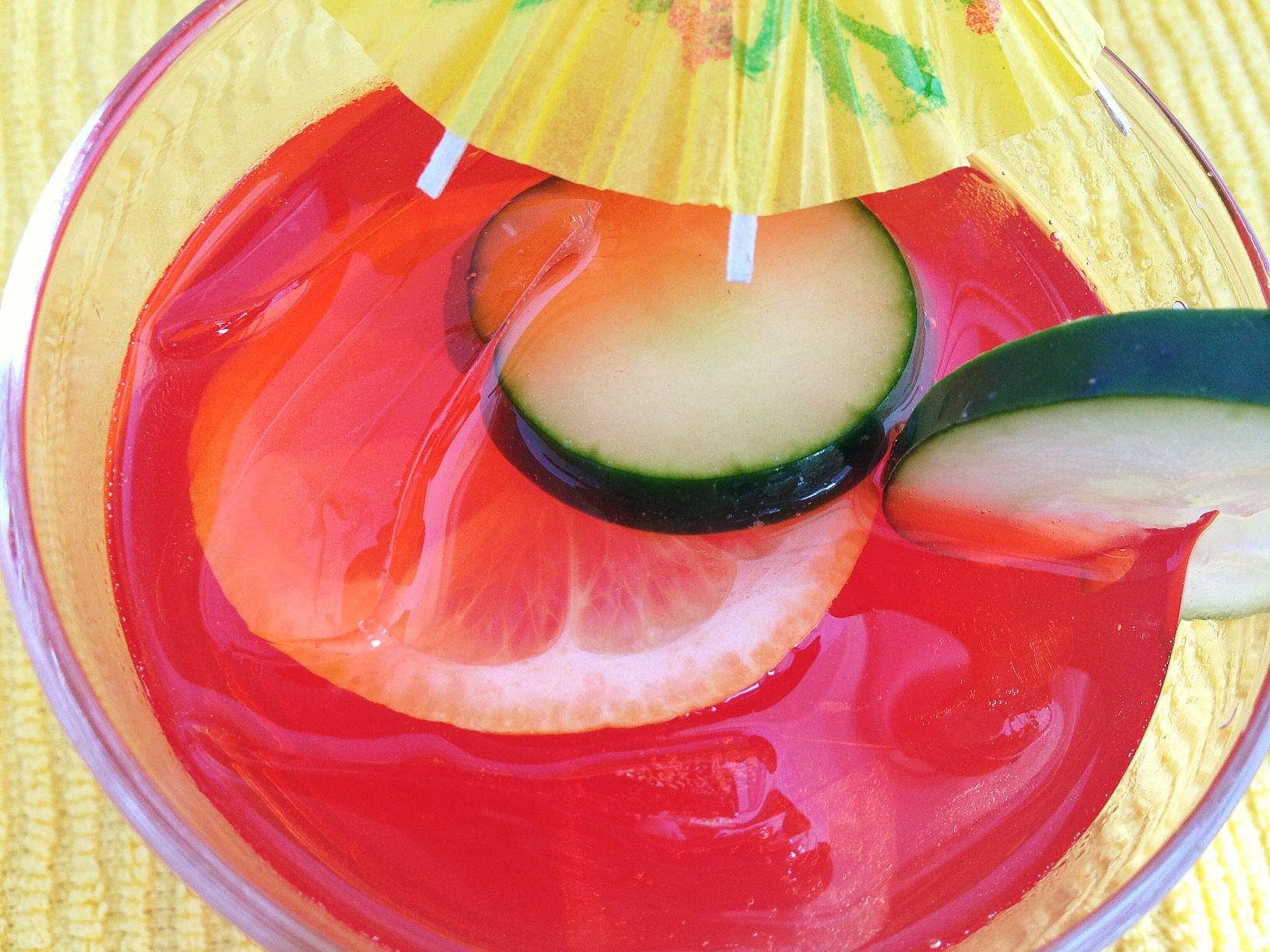
Chapman with a cocktail umbrella
