= Ila Alasepo =

Yoruba okro soup

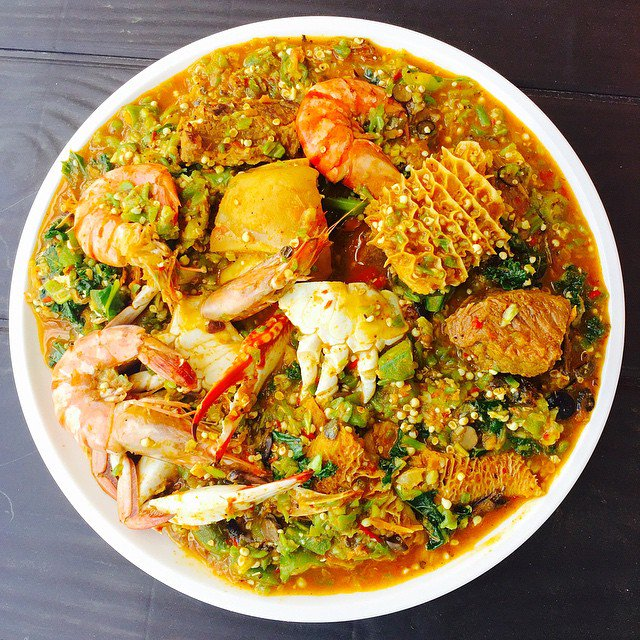
Ila Alasepo

Ila Alasepo or ila asepo is a Yoruba Okro sauce/ stew, called soup in Nigerian English, eaten with Okele. Ila-Alasepo means "Okro with assorted mix". It involves an Okro sauce cooked with seafood and spices. It can also have meat and fish as well. Ila alasepo is similar to African Gombo or Sauce Gombo or Louisiana Gumbo. The dish can have the okro viscous or viscosity free. It is different from " Ila" which just means okro which in cooked Yoruba cuisine usually refers to a plain cooked okro or cooked with Iru separately cooked from a tomato-pepper based sauce called Obe-ata that it is eaten with alongsides Okele. Unlike ila, ila alasepo is cooked together and usually features seafood, meat and fish, with pepper, tomato, oil, onion, iru and other spices added in one pot. it can be called Obe Ila alasepo, Obe means Soup, Sauce or Stew in Yoruba.
