= Ayamase =

Type of sauce or stew native to the Yoruba people

Ayamase, also spelled Ayamashe, is a special type of sauce or stew native to the Yoruba people in West Africa. It is eaten with Ofada rice and sometimes regular white rice. It is a made with peppers, green peppers and spices. It usually contains meat, fish and eggs. It has a dark greenish colour. It is different from a stew called Ofada sauce or Lafenwa stew which is reddish and also eaten with Ofada rice. It is popular in Yoruba parties called Owanbe and in home cooking.

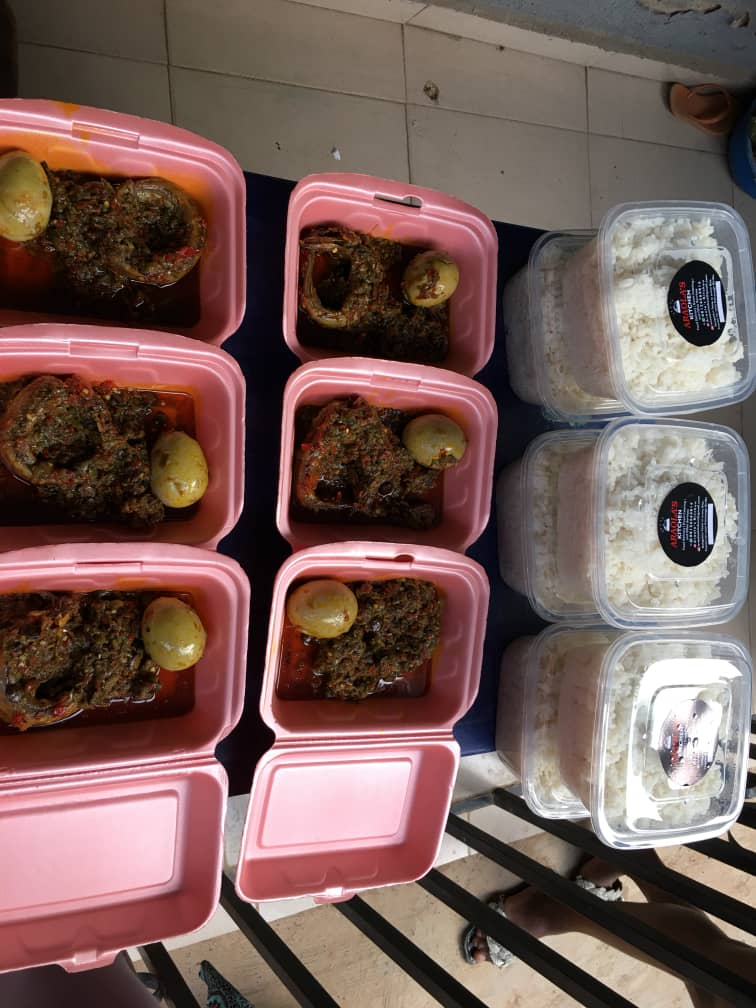
Ayamase
