= Moin moin =

Nigerian bean pudding

Moin-moin, moi-moi
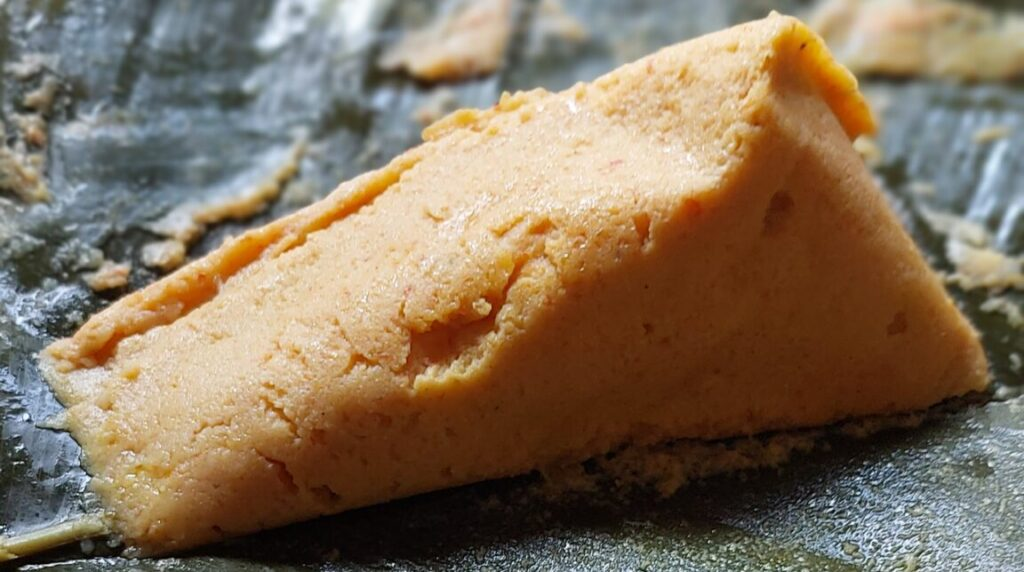
- Alternative names: Moyi-moyi, mai-mai, olele (ọọlẹ), abará
- Type: Pudding
- Place of origin: Yorubaland
- Main ingredients: Black-eyed beans or honey beans, onions, fresh ground peppers, oil

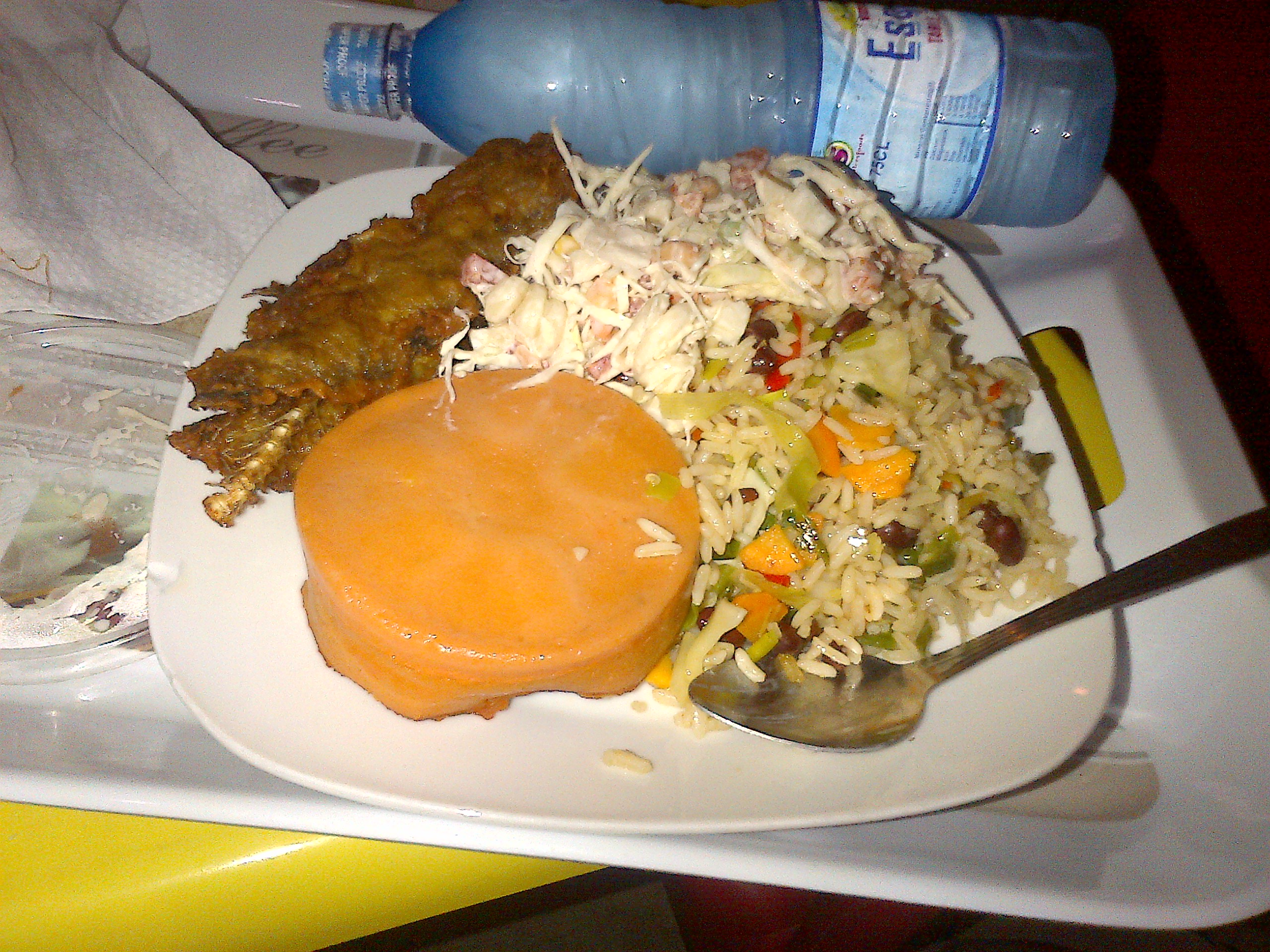
Nigerian fried rice served with grilled fish, mixed salad and moi-moi

Moin-moin, moi-moi or olele (Yoruba: mọ́yín-mọyín, ọ́lẹ̀lẹ̀) is a steamed or boiled bean pudding made from a mixture of washed and peeled beans and onions, fresh red peppers, spices, and often fish, eggs, chicken or crayfish. It is a protein-rich Yoruba food that is commonly eaten across Yorubaland and close regions in West Africa. It is also eaten among Yoruba-descent Brazilians and also called abará.

== Ingredients ==
- Beans or Black-eyed Peas
- Onion
- Palm oil or Vegetable Oil
- Eggs
- Beef liver
- Chicken bouillon Cubes
- Crayfish
- Salt

== Preparation ==
Moi-moi is prepared from beans that have been soaked and ground into a smooth paste, then blended with dried crayfish, vegetable oil, onions, and fresh red peppers for flavor and color. To enrich it, some people stir in extras like sardines, corned beef, shredded chicken, or slices of boiled egg.

Moin-moin usually comes in a slanted pyramid, cylindrical, or cone shape based on the mold it is poured into prior to cooking. The pyramid shape comes from the traditional broad Ewe Eran (Thaumatococcus daniellii), or banana leaves fashioned into a cone in one's palm. The seasoned and garnished paste is poured into the leaves, which are folded. The cylindrical shapes come from when empty cans or foil are used.

Moin-moin is eaten alone as a snack or with rice as a meal or with ogi (pap), oatmeal, custard, salad, koko or garri.

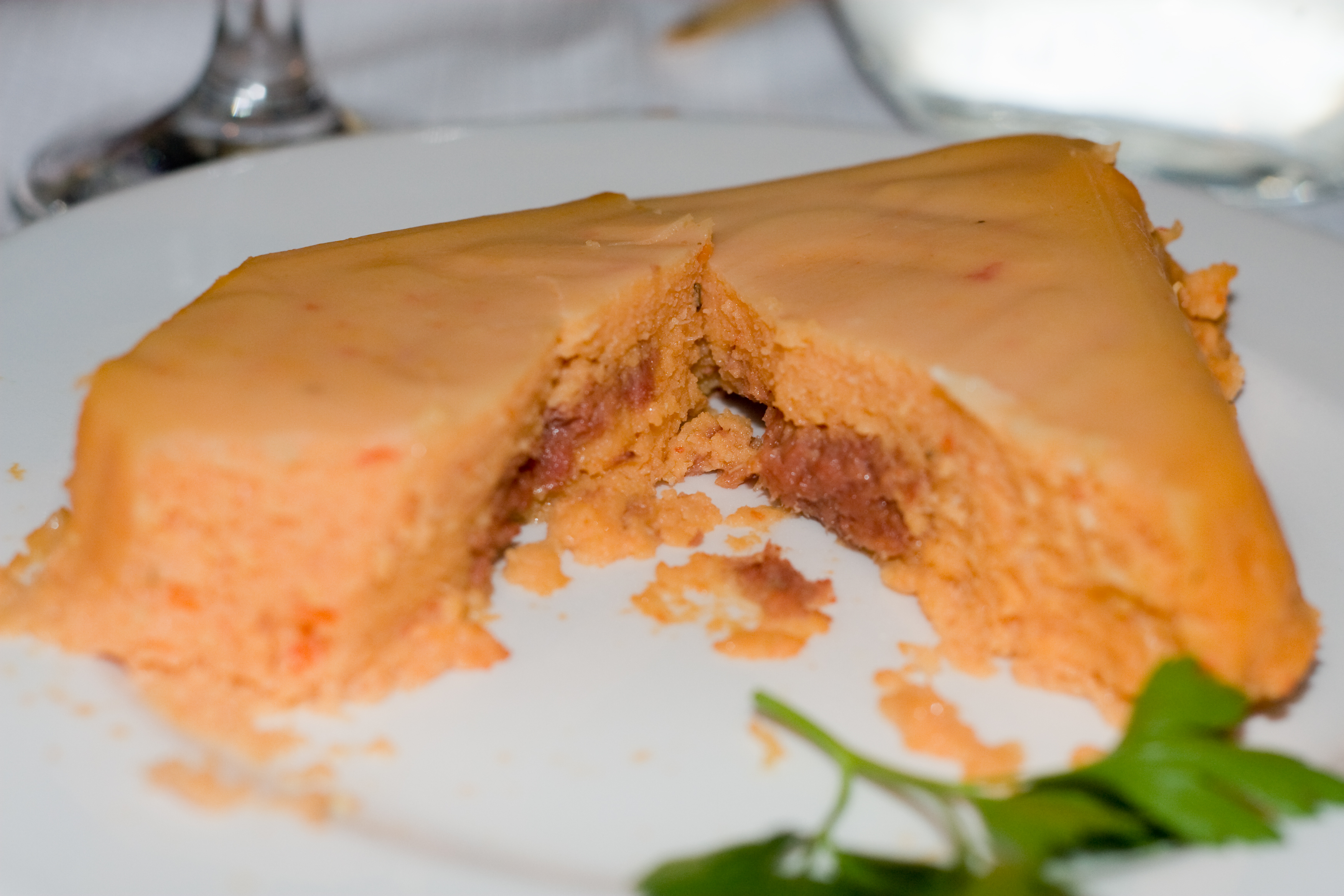
Sliced moin-moin

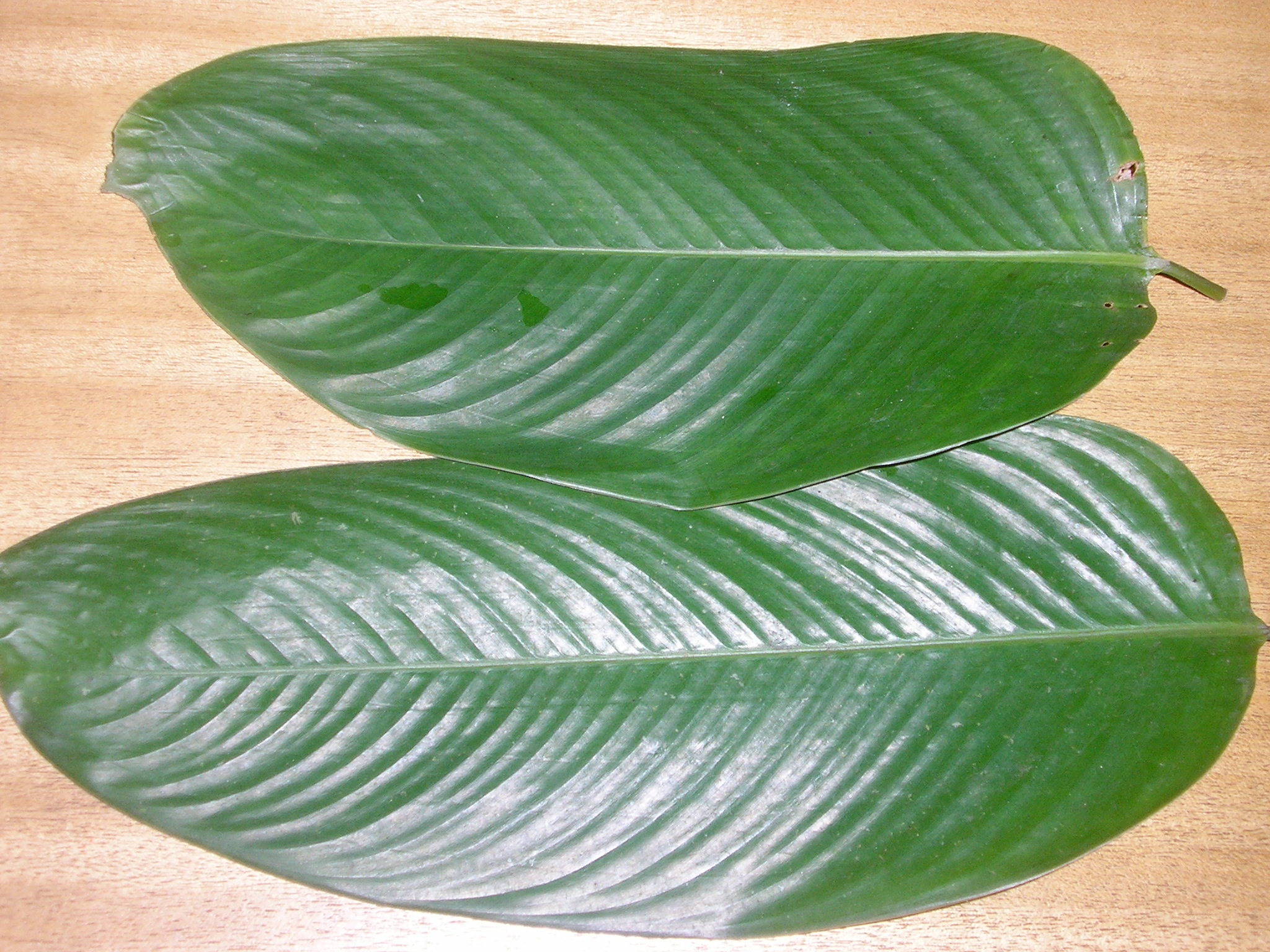
Ewe-eran leaves (Thaumatococcus daniellii)

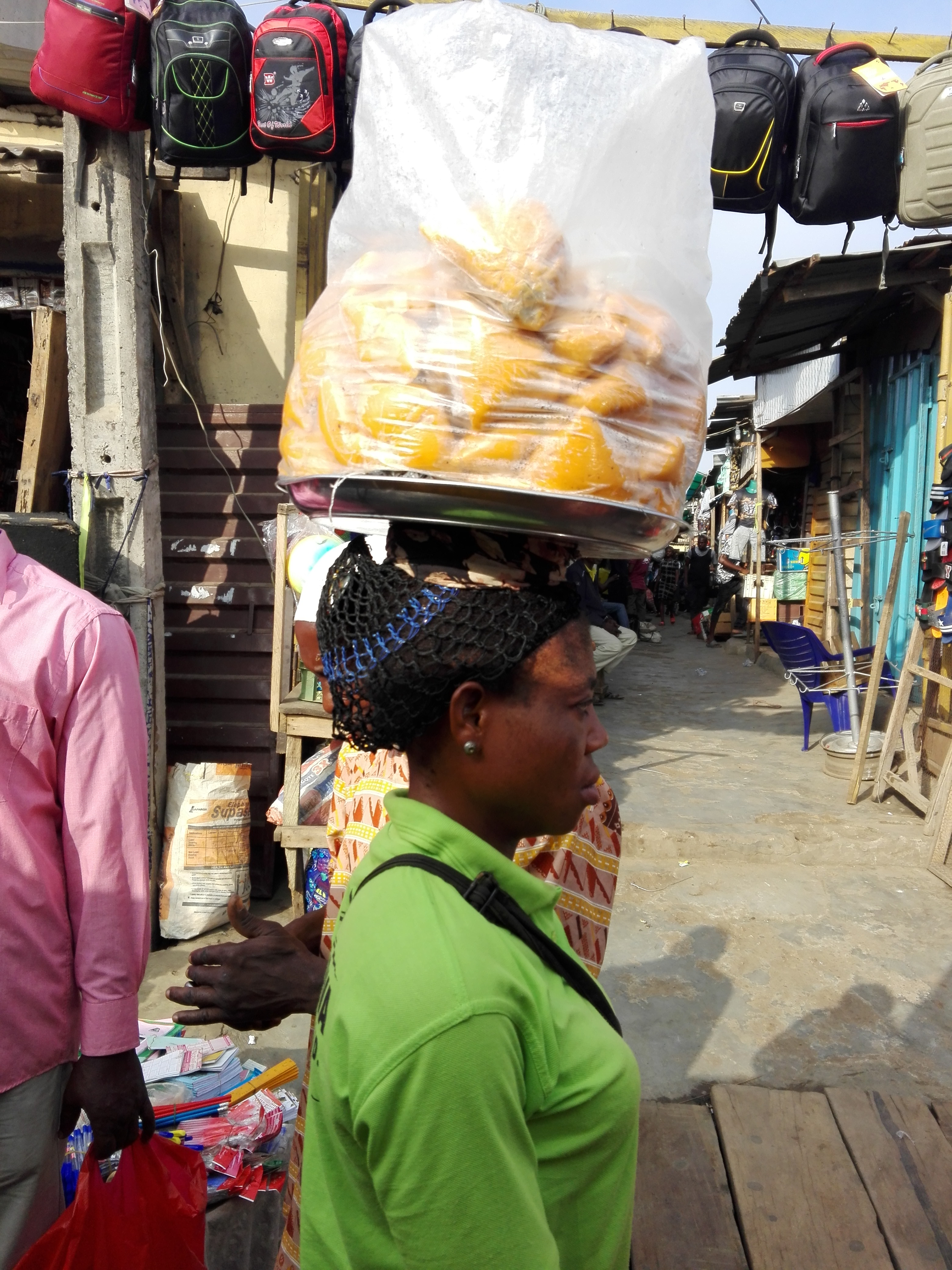
Moin-moin seller in Nigeria

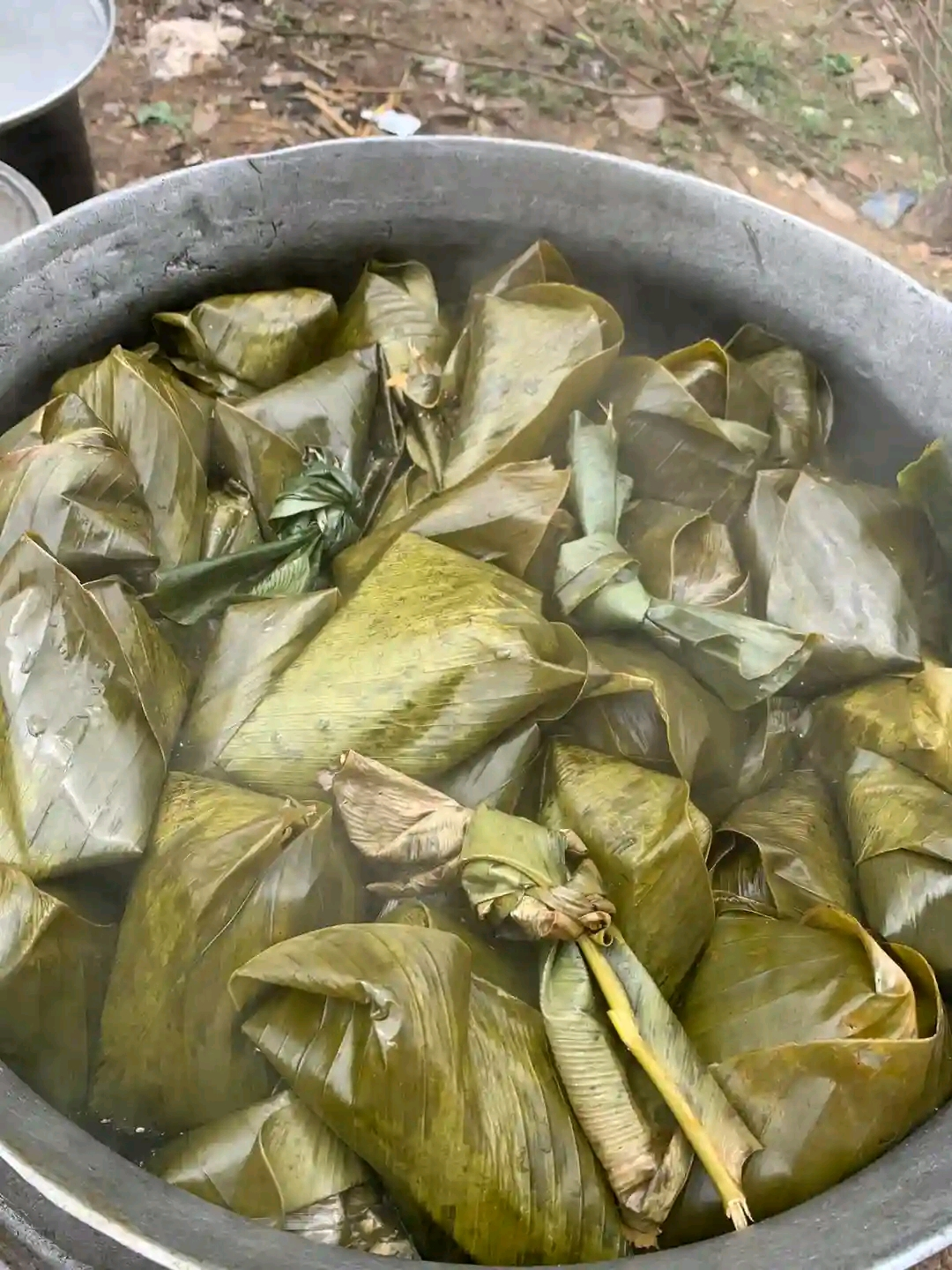
Moi-moi cooked and wrapped in leaves

== See also ==
- Akara
- Okpa
- List of African dishes
- List of steamed foods
