= Fried plantain =

Cooked dish made from plantains

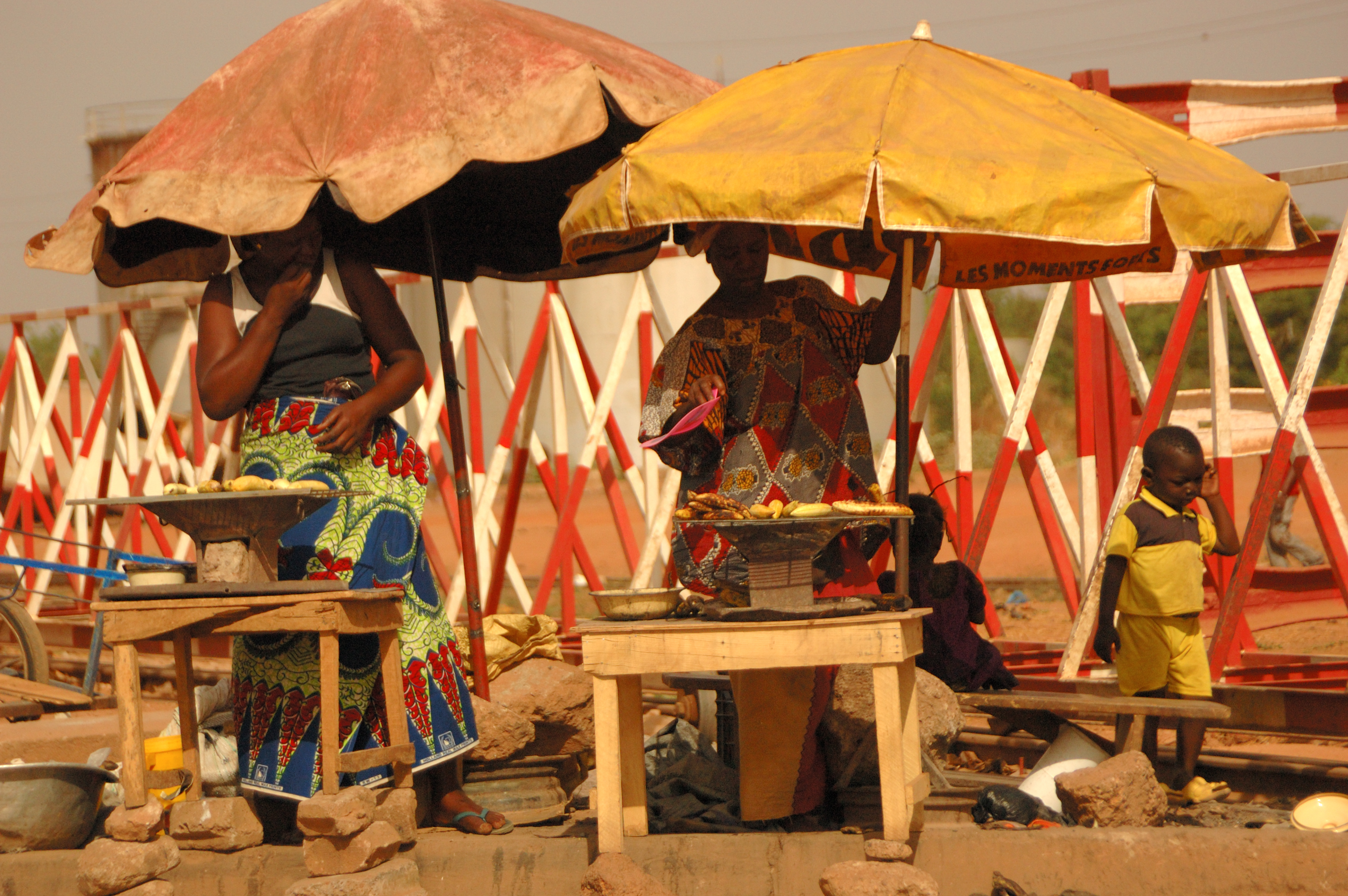
Roasted plantain sellers in Ouagadougou, Burkina Faso

Fried plantain is a dish cooked wherever plantains grow, from West Africa to East Africa as well as Central America, the tropical region of northern South America and the Caribbean countries such as Haiti and Cuba and in many parts of Southeast Asia and Oceania, where fried snacks are widely popular. In Indonesia, it is called pisang goreng. It is called dodo in Yoruba in South West Nigeria, otherwise known as simply fried plantain in other parts of Nigeria. Kelewele is a fried spicy plantain typically served as a side dish for red red (African stewed black-eyed peas) and fish stew in Ghana.

Fried plantain is also eaten in some countries in South America and the Caribbean where African influence is present. For example in the Dominican Republic, Nicaragua, Puerto Rico and to a lesser extent Cuba, it is common to cut plantains into slices, fry them until they are yellow, smash them between two plates and fry them again. Puerto Rico has mofongo, a dish consisting of fried and pounded plantains with chicharrón, spices, fat (butter, lard or olive oil) and usually in a broth or served with meat, seafood on top or on the side. This is also a common dish in Haiti, referred to as bannann peze, and throughout Central America, referred to as patacones in Costa Rica, Panama, Colombia and Ecuador, and as tostones in Nicaragua and the Spanish-speaking Caribbean. In Honduras and Venezuela they are referred to as tajadas. Puerto Rico also has arañitas (spiders), where green and yellow plantains are shredded together, seasoned, shaped into patties then fried until crisp. Other traditional fried plantain dishes in Puerto Rico include alcapurria, pionono, ralleno de amarillo (similar to papa rellena but made with yellow plantain instead of potato), and bolitas de plátano (plantain dumplings).

== Consumption and uses ==
Fried plantain may be served as a snack, a starter or a side dish to the main course, such as with Jollof rice, spicy barbecued meat, tomato stew or beans. It is made in different ways: salted or unsalted, cut into "ears" or "fingers", diced or fried whole.

In the Spanish-speaking Caribbean fried green plantains are eaten with mojo sauce in Cuba and Puerto Rico and wasakaka in the Dominican Republic, both a wet savory garlic sauce. They are sometimes eaten with ketchup or a mayonnaise-ketchup mixture. In the Pacific city of Cali, Colombia, plantains are eaten fried and accompanied by a condiment called Hogao. Sweet plantains are also served with savory entrees in the Caribbean, especially the Spanish-speaking islands, Pacific Colombia and Jamaica.

=== In Africa ===
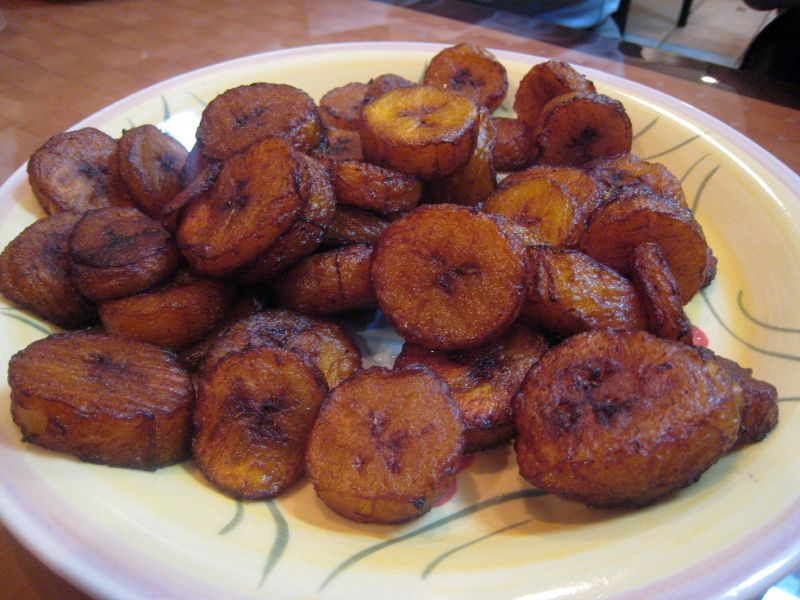
Dodo

Alloco, as it is called in Côte d'Ivoire and Burkina Faso, is called dodo (Yoruba) in Nigeria, missolè in Cameroon, kɔkɔɔ a y’akyi (Twi) in Ghana and makemba in the Democratic Republic of Congo. The name alloco (sometimes seen as aloko) comes from the Baoulé, an ethnic group found in the Eastern Ivory Coast. It is derived from the word loko, which signifies if a plantain was ripe. It is a popular West African snack made from fried plantain. It is often served with chili pepper and onions. In West Africa, it often serves as a side or can be consumed by itself.

Gizdodo is a side dish in Nigeria containing fried plantain and grilled gizzard.

Alloco is widely considered as fast-food and is sold on the streets of Côte d'Ivoire. An area with many grilled meat and alloco food vendors in the Cocody neighborhood is named Allocodrome, after this dish.

==== Ipekere ====
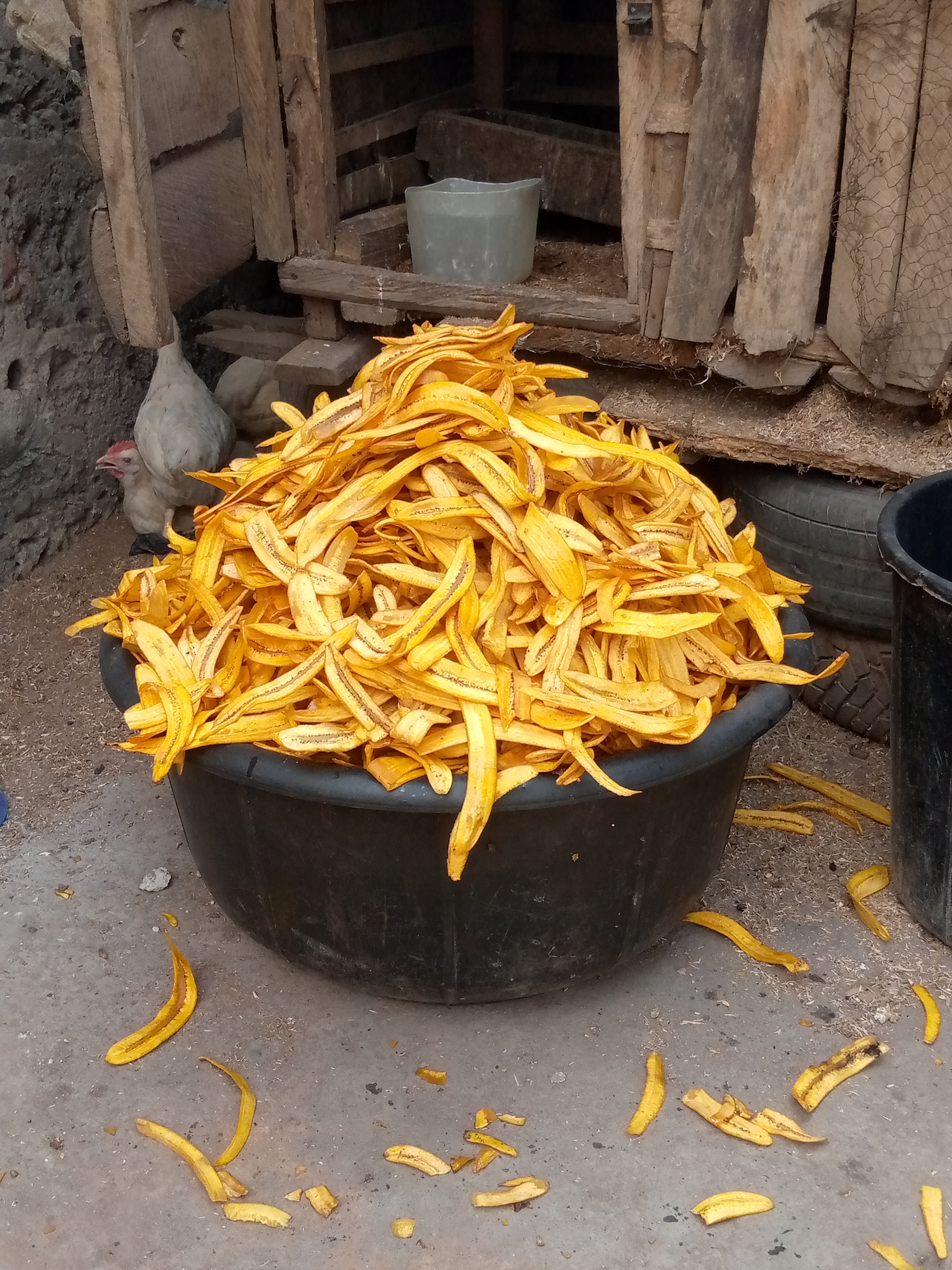
Ipekere

Ipekere is a traditional Nigerian snack with roots in Yoruba cuisine. They are plantain chips. They are made from ripe and unripe plantains that are sliced into thin rounds or thin vertical shapes and deep-fried to achieve a crispy texture. The name is derived from the Yoruba language and is widely recognized throughout Nigeria.

This traditional snack has a long history and is cherished for its delightful taste and simplicity. They are a staple in Yoruba cuisine and is enjoyed by people of all ages across Nigeria. In January 2024, a viral picture on social media depicted a woman processing the plantain chips with polythene nylon in hot vegetable oil; thus, citizens of Nigeria and Lagos State in particular were asked by NAFDAC to be careful of where they make purchase of the snacks, and ensure that they are registered with them.

===== Preparation =====
To prepare ipekere, ripe plantains are peeled and sliced into thin, uniform shapes, typically using a knife or a mandoline slicer. These are deep-fried until they turn golden brown, resulting in a crunchy and slightly sweet snack. Ipekere is seasoned with salt or sugar. They can also be flavoured with different spices, such as cayenne pepper, ginger, onion powder, or garlic powder. Some people also fry onions and fresh ginger along with the plantain slices for added flavour.

==== Kelewele ====
Kelewele
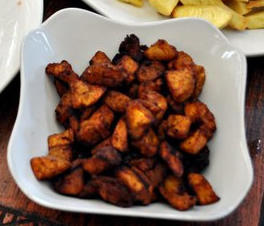
- Type: Snack
- Place of origin: Ghana
- Main ingredients: Plantains, spices

Kelewele is a popular Ghanaian food made of fried plantains seasoned with spices. Kelewele is also the name of the spice mix itself. In Accra, kelewele is usually sold at night by street vendors and sometimes in the afternoon by the country side women. Kelewele is also a popular choice for dinner. It is often served with beans stew, peanuts, or alone as a dessert.

Originally from Ghana, kelewele has been popularized in America by several recipe books (recipezaar, 2009)

===== Preparation =====
The plantains are peeled and may be cut into chunks or cubes. Ginger, cayenne pepper, and salt are the typical spices used to make kelewele. Onions, anise, cloves, nutmeg, cinnamon, and chili powder, however, may also be used as spices. Commercial preparations exist that can simplify preparation and offer a standardized taste. The oil should be hot and the plantain should not be too soft or it will absorb too much oil. The plantain should be fried until the sugar in it caramelizes, and produces brown edges on the plantain.

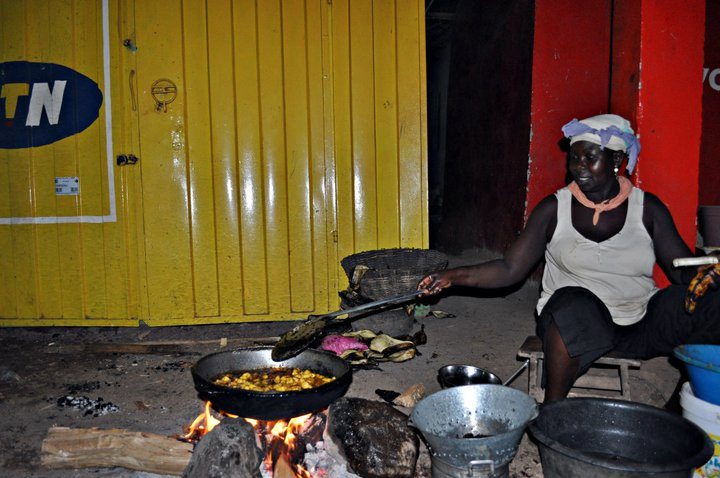
Kelewele vendor in Takoradi, Ghana

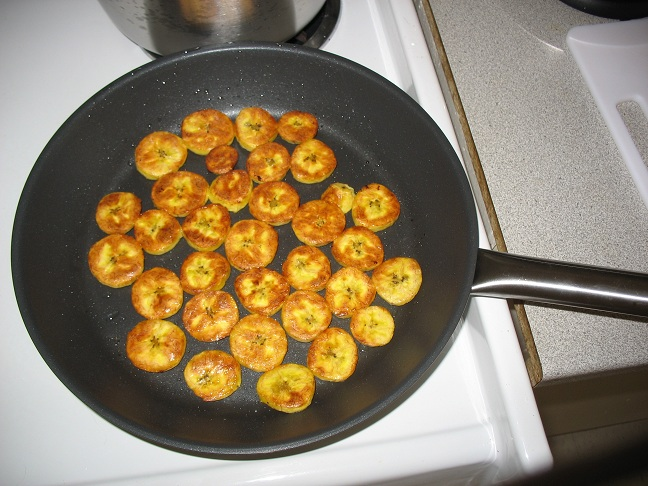
Plantains being fried

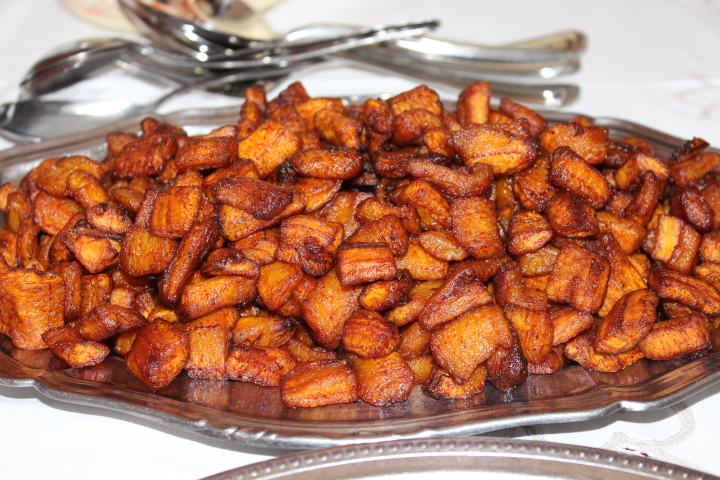
A platter of fried plantains

== See also ==
- Banana chip
- Banana fritter
- Chifle
- List of banana dishes
- Tostones
- Vegetable chips
