= Dagaaba–Frafra Friendly Games =

Annual event in Ghana

The Dagaaba–Frafra Friendly Games are an annual community sporting and cultural event organised by members of the Dagaaba and Frafra communities in the Accra–Tema metropolitan area of Ghana. The event combines football, volleyball and other sports with cultural displays, traditional food and music. The games reached their 29th edition in 2026, with most editions held at the El-Wak Stadium.

== Background and cultural context ==
The games draw on the traditional joking relationship between the Dagaaba in the Upper West Region and the Frafras in the Upper East Region. The relationship allows members of the two communities to tease and joke with one another without taking offence and has been described as contributing to social cohesion and peaceful relations between the communities.

An element of the relationship is the dog head story, commonly referred to as Baazu, meaning dog head in Dagaare and Gurune. According to oral tradition, two brothers or cousins representing the ancestors of the Dagaaba and Frafra were travelling together during a severe famine with their dog. When food became scarce, they agreed to kill the dog for meat. After dividing the meat between them, they discovered that the dog’s head was missing, leading each side to accuse the other of taking it. The unresolved question of who took the dog’s head became a recurring subject of joking between the two communities.

== Activities and programme ==
The games combine competitive sports with cultural activities. Sporting events reported across different editions have included:

- Football, including men's and women's matches.
- Volleyball, including men's and women's matches.
- Basketball.
- Sack races.
- Lime-and-spoon or egg-and-spoon races.
- Tug-of-war, sometimes referred to as "tug-of-peace".

The programme also includes cultural activities such as traditional music and dance performances, cultural displays, and exhibitions of traditional clothing and artefacts. Food and drinks associated with northern Ghana, including tuo zaafi, tubaani, bambara beans, koose and pito, have also been offered at the event.

== Editions ==
=== 2026 edition ===
The 29th edition is scheduled to take place on 5 September 2026 at El-Wak Stadium. It is being held under the theme, Unity in Diversity: The Dagaaba-Frafra Model for Peaceful Co-existence. The Frafra community are the defending champions. The programme includes football, basketball, cultural performances, traditional music and dance, and display of northern Ghanaian food and clothing.

=== 2025 edition ===
The 28th edition was held on 6 September 2025 at El-Wak Stadium under the theme emphasising unity and cultural heritage. The programme featured sports, cultural performances and northern Ghanaian cuisine, with Frafra emerging as the overall winners.
