= Ghanaian cuisine =

Culinary traditions of Ghana

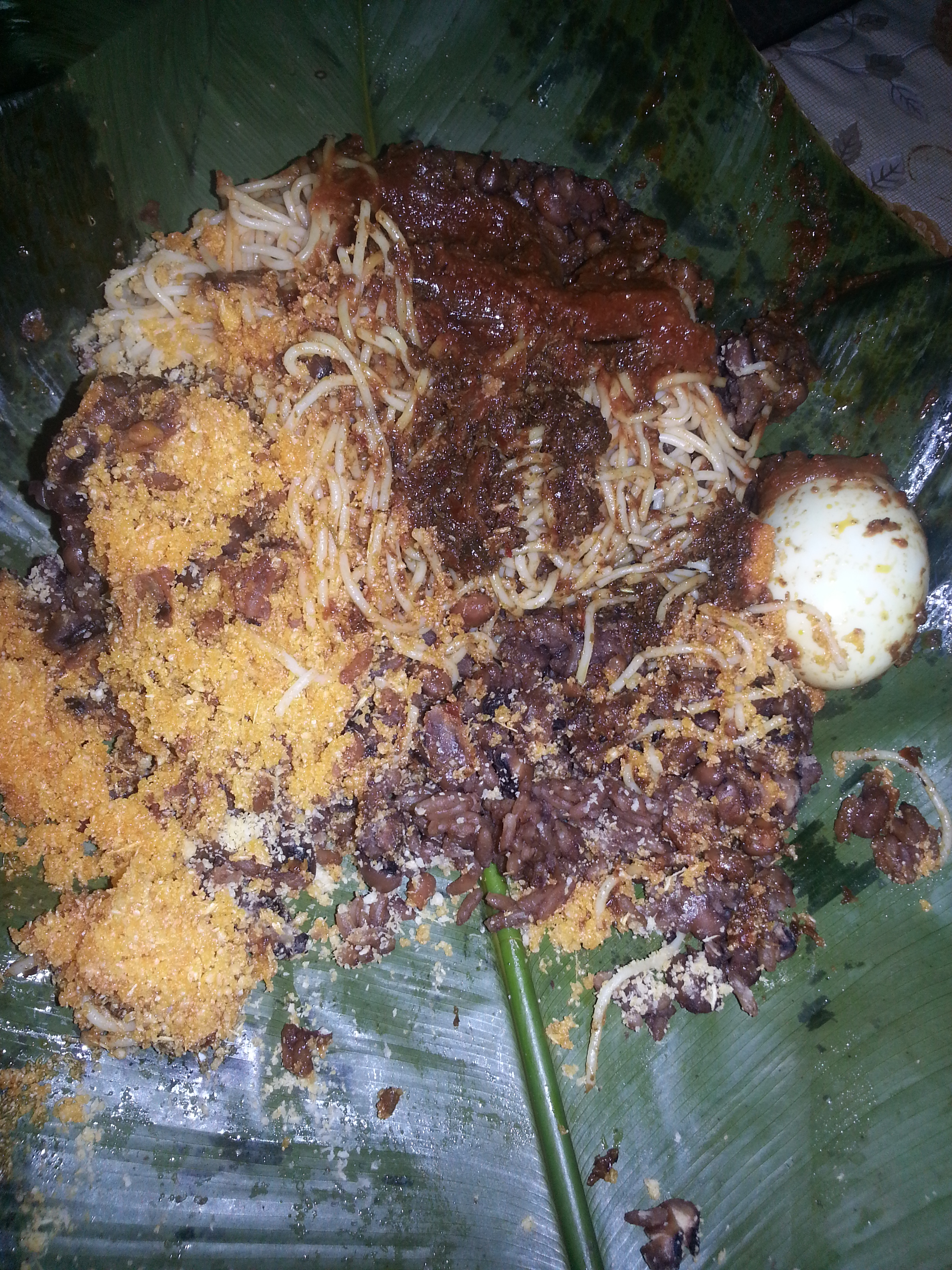
Waakye (rice and beans) served with spaghetti and boiled egg

Location of Ghana

Ghanaian cuisine is the cooking traditions of Ghana. It centers on starchy staple foods, accompanied by either a sauce or soup and a source of protein. The primary ingredients for the vast majority of soups and stews are tomatoes, hot peppers, onions, and some local species. As a result of these main ingredients, most Ghanaian jollof rice, soups, and stews appear red or orange.

Ghanaian foods heavily rely on traditional food crops grown in Ghana, combined with crops introduced through colonial and globalized crops, gardens and cuisine.

== Main staple foods ==
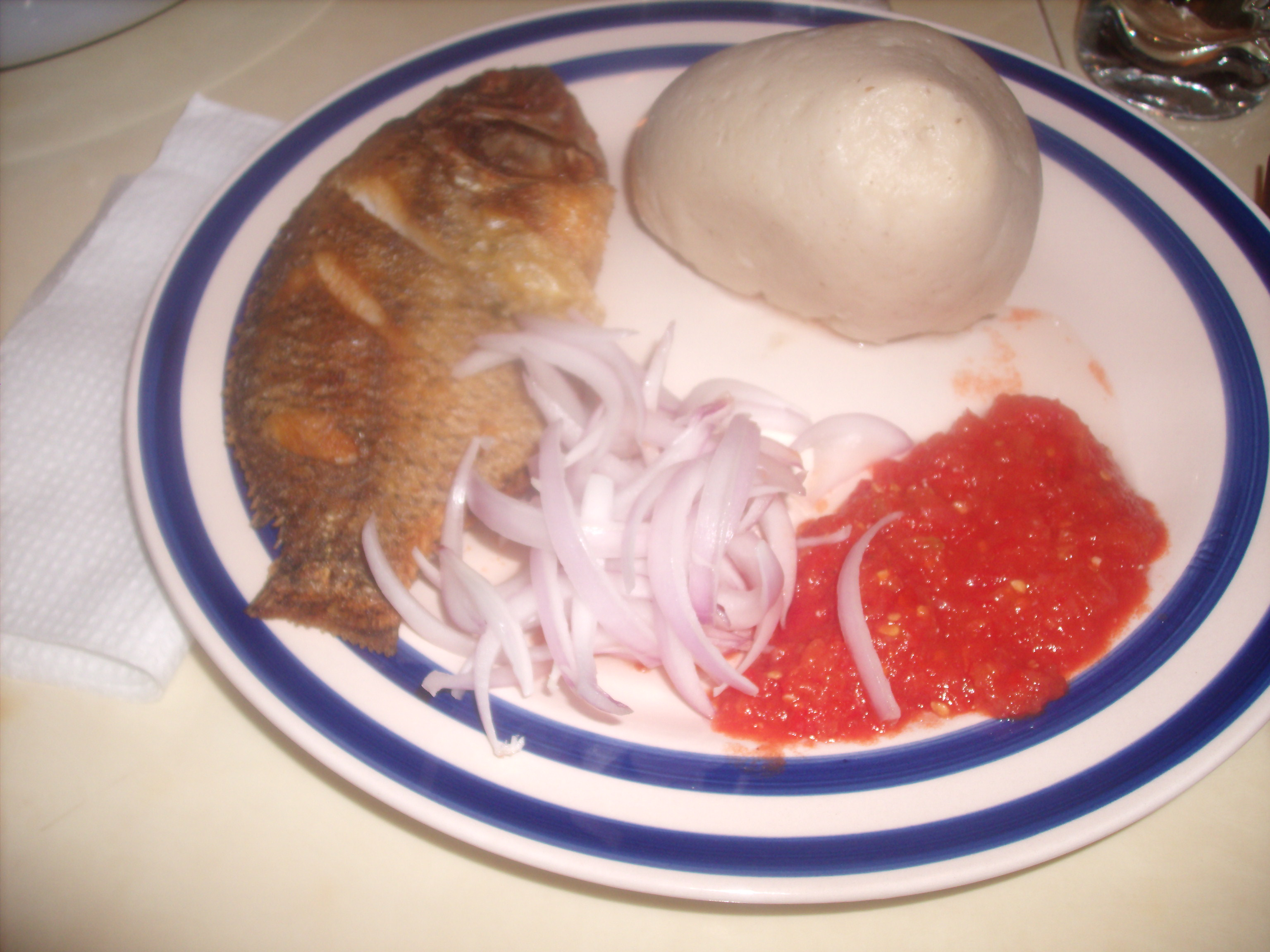
Ghanaian-style banku

The typical staple foods in the southern part of Ghana include cassava and plantain. In the north, the main staple foods include millet and sorghum. Yam, maize, and beans are eaten across Ghana, and sweet potatoes and cocoyam are important vegetables in Ghanaian cuisine. With the advent of globalization, cereals such as rice and wheat have been increasingly incorporated into Ghanaian cuisine, notably in the form of bread. The foods below represent Ghanaian dishes made from these staple foods.

=== Foods made with maize ===
- Abolo is a steamed corn dough and sugar mixture. It is eaten with various soups and sauces by the Ewe.
- Akple, a traditional meal of the Ewe, is made with corn flour. It can be eaten with pepper sauces, stews, or any soup, but it is typically served with okra soup (fetri detsi) or herring stew (abɔbitadi).
- Ba mi ku or banku are balls of slightly fermented corn and cassava flour mix that are boiled in hot water. It is a traditional meal of the Ga-Dangme (or Ga) tribe of the Greater Accra Region, and can be eaten with pepper sauces, stews, or any soup. Banku requires the use of a special preformulated watery material called "slightly fermented corn-cassava dough mix", which is cooked to a soft solid consistency called "corn-cassava dough AFLATA". Sometimes only corn flour is used, but in many areas, cassava dough is cooked together with fermented corn dough in different ratios. Banku cooked with cassava and corn dough is called agbelimorkple by the Ewe people; banku made with corn dough but without cassava dough is known as kutornu-kple (cotonou banku) to the Ewe people or mmore to the Akan people.
- Kenkey or komi is fermented corn dough wrapped in corn, originating from the Ga people of the Ga-Adangbe. A variation on the dish originating from the Fanti people is called Fante dokono or Fanti kenkey, and is wrapped with plantain leaves that give it a different texture, flavor, and colour compared to the Ga kenkey. Both are boiled for long periods until they form solid balls.
- Fonfom is a maize dish popular in south-western Ghana.
- Nkyekyeraa is a Ghanaian dish made up of dry corn and groundnuts, which is mostly found in the Bono, Bono East and Ahafo regions. It is usually wrapped in corn leaves and boiled until it becomes soft enough to be chewed easily.
- Tuozaafi is a millet, sorghum, or maize dish originating from Northern Ghana and is a staple food of the Dagaaba people. The grain is boiled until it becomes firm.
- Yoroyoro is widely eaten across Dagbon and many parts of Northern Ghana. It is made by boiling maize until it is softened. The food is eaten with pepper and onions.

=== Foods made with rice ===
- Angwa moo, or oiled rice, is made by frying onions in oil, then adding water and rice. It may be cooked with other vegetables or minced meat. It is typically served with earthenware-ground pepper, and either tinned sardines or fried eggs.
- Jollof rice is a rice cooked in a stew made of stock, tomatoes, spices, and meat. This dish originated from the Jolof traders from Senegal who settled in the Zongo settlements before the colonial period. Adapted to local Ghanaian tastes, it is typically eaten with goat, lamb, chicken, or beef that has been stewed, roasted, or grilled.
- Omo tuo, or rice ball, is sticky mashed rice, often eaten with groundnut or palm nut soup.
- Fried rice is a Chinese-style dish adapted to Ghanaian tastes. It is popularly known as Check Check.
- Waakye is a dish of rice and beans with black-eyed peas or kidney beans, coconut, and Sorghum bicolor, which gives waakye a reddish color.

=== Foods made with cassava ===
- Attiéké or akyeke is a culinary specialty of the lagoon people (Ebrié, Adjoukrou, Alladian, Abidji, Avikam, Ahizi, Attie) of southern Ivory Coast. It is popular among the Ahanta, Nzema and Akan-speaking people of Ivory Coast.
- Garri, cassava flour, can be eaten dry with beans, or mixed with tomatoes and spices and then kneaded. Garri is often served with red red, a fish and black-eyed pea stew, or shito and fish.
- Fufu is a dish made from pounded cassava and plantains, yam and plantain, or cocoyam/taro. It is a side dish that is always accompanied by one of the many Ghanaian soups.
- Kokonte, or abete, is made from dried peeled cassava powder and is usually served with groundnut soup that includes some meat, such as tripe or lamb.
- Plakali is similar to banku but is made from cassava only. It is popular among the Ahanta, Nzema and Akan-speaking people of Ivory Coast.
- Yakayake is an Ewe dish made from steamed grated cassava. It is eaten with various stews or soups.

=== Foods made with beans ===
A deviation from the starch and stew combination are bean-based foods such as red red and tubaani.

- Red red is a popular Ghanaian bean and fish stew served with fried ripe plantains and often accompanied with garri, fish, and pulses. It earns its name from the palm oil that tints the bean stew and the bright orange color of the fried, ripe plantains. In some cases boiled egg is added and also avocado when in season.
- Tubaani is a boiled bean cake, called moin moin in Nigeria.
- Koose is a pea fritter that can be served between two slices of bread or with porridge.

=== Foods made with yam ===
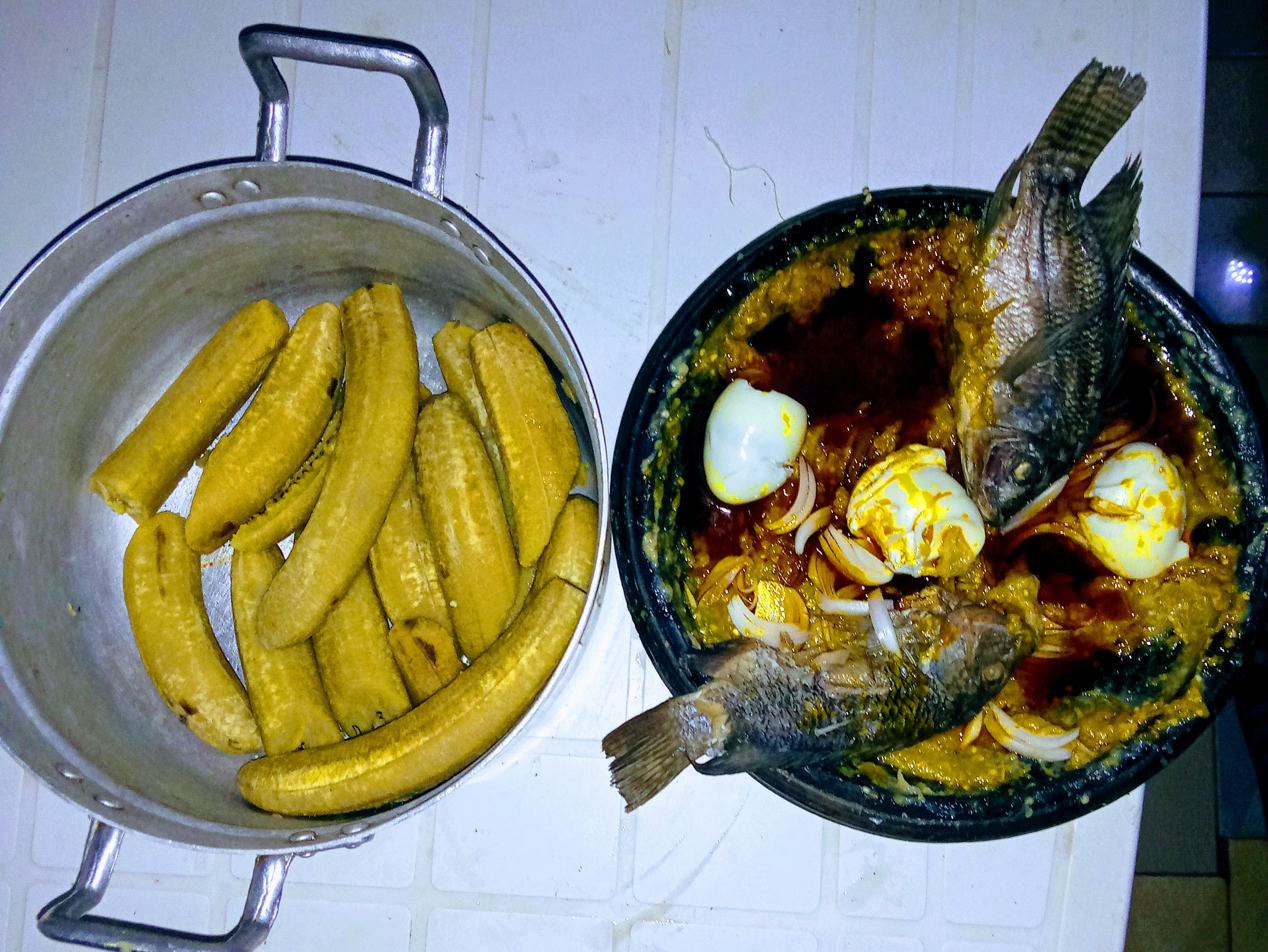
Locally made ampesie (plantain and garden eggs stew)

- Ampesie, boiled yam, is a dish that can also be made with plantains, cocoyams, potatoes, or cassava. It is a side dish traditionally eaten with a fish stew containing tomatoes, oil, and spices.
- Fried yam can be served with a variety of stews and pepper sauces. The yam chips are deep-fried so that the outside is crispy and the inside is soft.
- Mpoto mpoto (yam casserole or porridge) are slices of yam cooked in a lot of water with pepper, onions, tomatoes, salt, and seasoning.
- Roasted tam is a popular street snack made from white yam with brown bark.
- Yam fufu is fufu made with yam instead of cassava, plantains, or cocoyam. It is also traditionally eaten with Ghanaian soups. It is popular in Northern and southeastern Ghana.
- Yam balls are similar to Scotch eggs, with fillings like meat pie, spring rolls, samosa, or shawarma.

== Soups and stews ==
In Ghanaian cuisine, soups and stews are served as a main course rather than a starter and accompanied by side dishes. Ghanaian stews and soups use a liberal range of ingredients and a wide variety of flavours, spices, and textures. Soups and stews in Ghana are served with starches - such as yam, cocoyam, cassava, plantain, maize, millet, sorghum (discussed above under the introduction).

Vegetables such as palm nuts, peanuts, cocoyam leaves, ayoyo, spinach, wild mushroom, okra, garden eggs (eggplant), tomatoes, and various types of pulses are the main ingredients in Ghanaian soups and stews. Pulses may serve as the main protein ingredient in vegetarian dishes.

Beef, pork, goat, lamb, chicken, smoked turkey, tripe, dried snails, and fried fish are common sources of protein in Ghanaian soups and stews. It is common to find seafood in Ghanaian soups and stews, including crabs, shrimp, periwinkles, octopus, snails, grubs, duck, offal, pig's trotters, and oysters. Sometimes different types of meat and occasionally fish are mixed into one soup.

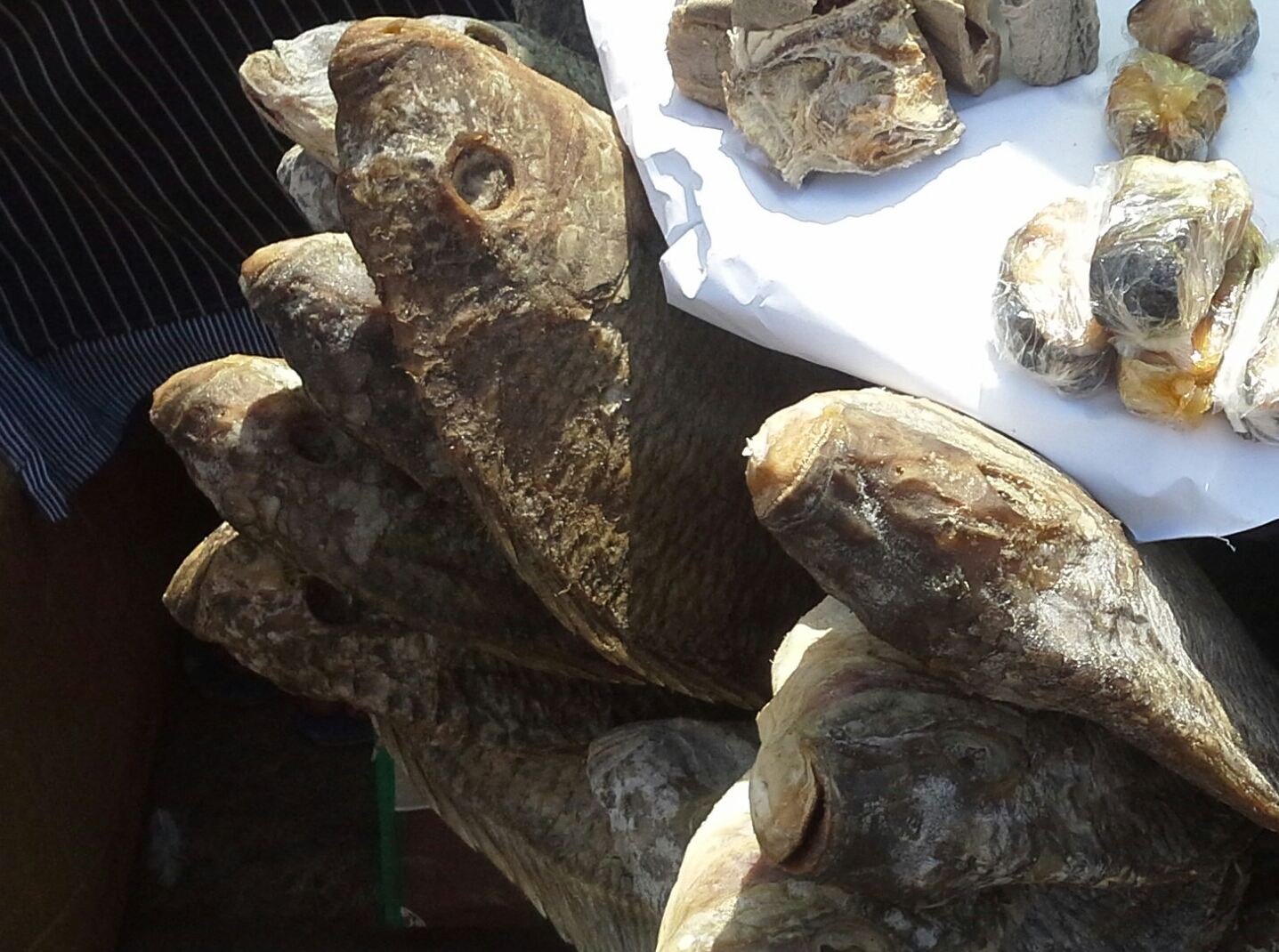
Koobi is dried tilapia that has been salted

Meat, mushrooms, and seafood may be smoked, salted, or dried for flavour enhancement and preservation. Salt fish is widely used to flavour fish-based stews. Spices such as thyme, garlic, onions, ginger, peppers, curry, basil, nutmeg, sumbala, Tetrapleura tetraptera (prekese) and bay leaf are typical flavours that characterize Ghanaian cuisine.

Some common Ghanaian soups include groundnut soup, light (tomato) soup, kontomire (taro leaves) soup, palm nut soup, ayoyo soup and okra soup. Ghanaian tomato stew or gravy is a stew that is often served with rice or waakye. Other vegetable stews are made with kontomire, garden eggs, egusi (pumpkin seeds), spinach, and okra. Among the Ewes, some soups are prepared with gboma (Solanum macrocarpa), yevugboma (European gboma), water leaf or ademe (jute mallow). These are commonly eaten with akple, abolo (steamed corn dough), and yakayake (steamed cassava dough).

Palm oil, coconut oil, shea butter, palm kernel oil, and peanut oil are important oils used for cooking or frying. Certain Ghanaian dishes require specific oils, which may not be substituted for (for example, palm oil is necessary in okro stew, eto, or fante fante, red red or Gabeans, egusi stew, or mpihu/mpotompoto). Coconut oil, palm kernel oil, and shea butter have declined in popularity for cooking in Ghana, due to negative advertisements and the introduction of refined oils; they are now mostly used in a few traditional homes, for soap making, and by commercial (street food) food vendors as a cheaper substitute to refined cooking oils.

== Breakfast ==
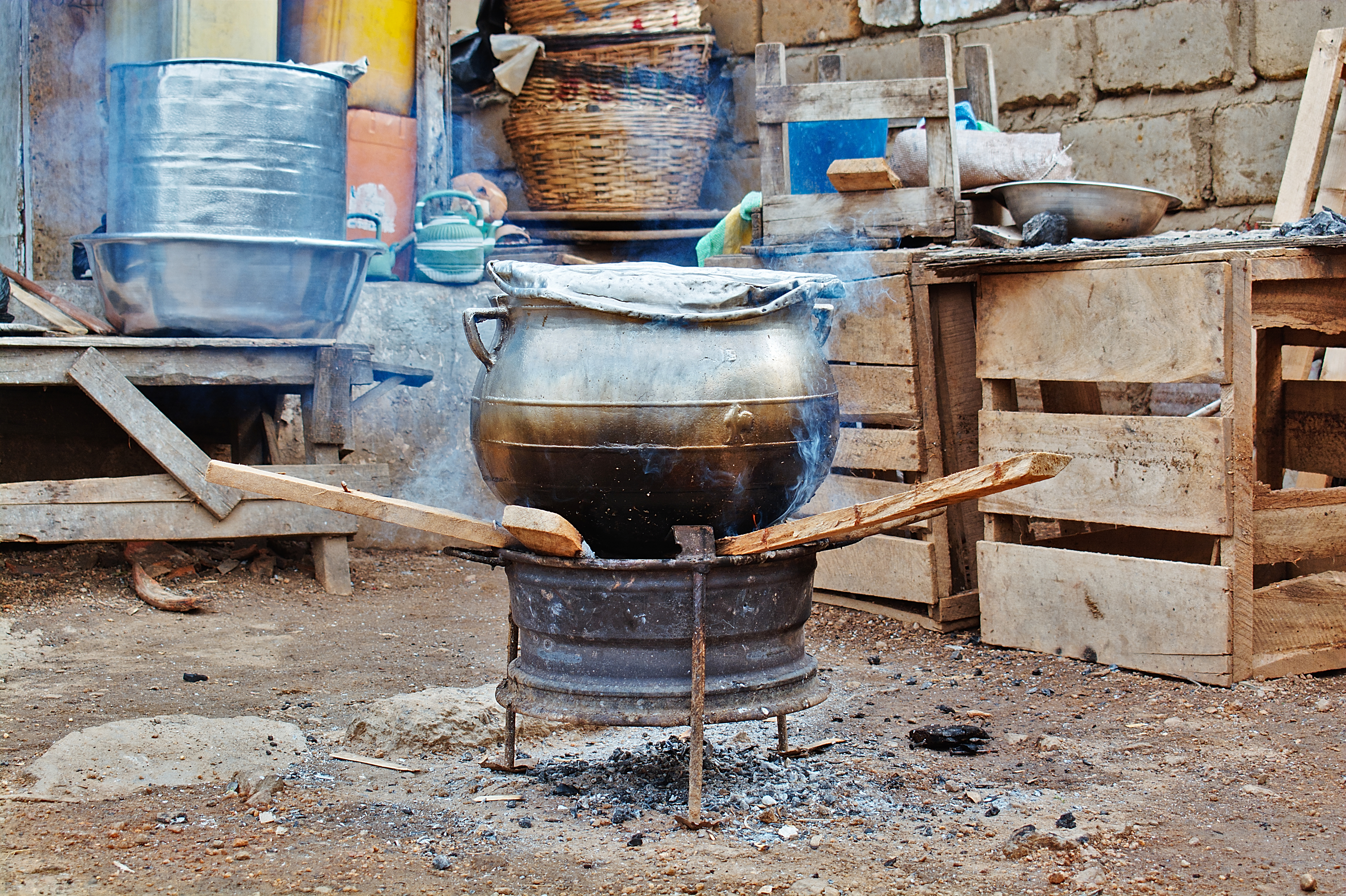
Making of koko (local porridge)

Typical breakfast foods in Ghanaian cuisine include tea or chocolate drinks; fruit; bread; porridge; and foods like koose/akara or maasa (beans, ripe plantain and maize meal fritters).

Bread is an important feature in Ghanaian breakfasts. Ghanaian bread is baked with wheat flour, and cassava flour may be added for an improved texture. There are four major types of bread in Ghana: tea bread (similar to the baguette), sugar bread (a sweet bread), brown (whole wheat) bread, and butter bread. Rye bread, oat bread and malt bread are also quite common.

Porridges are another common breakfast item and can be made from a variety of grains, including rice porridge, millet porridge, cereal (locally called rice water), kooko (fermented maize porridge) or tombrown (roasted maize porridge). A popular porridge in Northern Ghana is called Hausa koko (northern porridge). It is a sweet dish, often eaten with koose or bread with groundnuts.

== Sweet foods ==
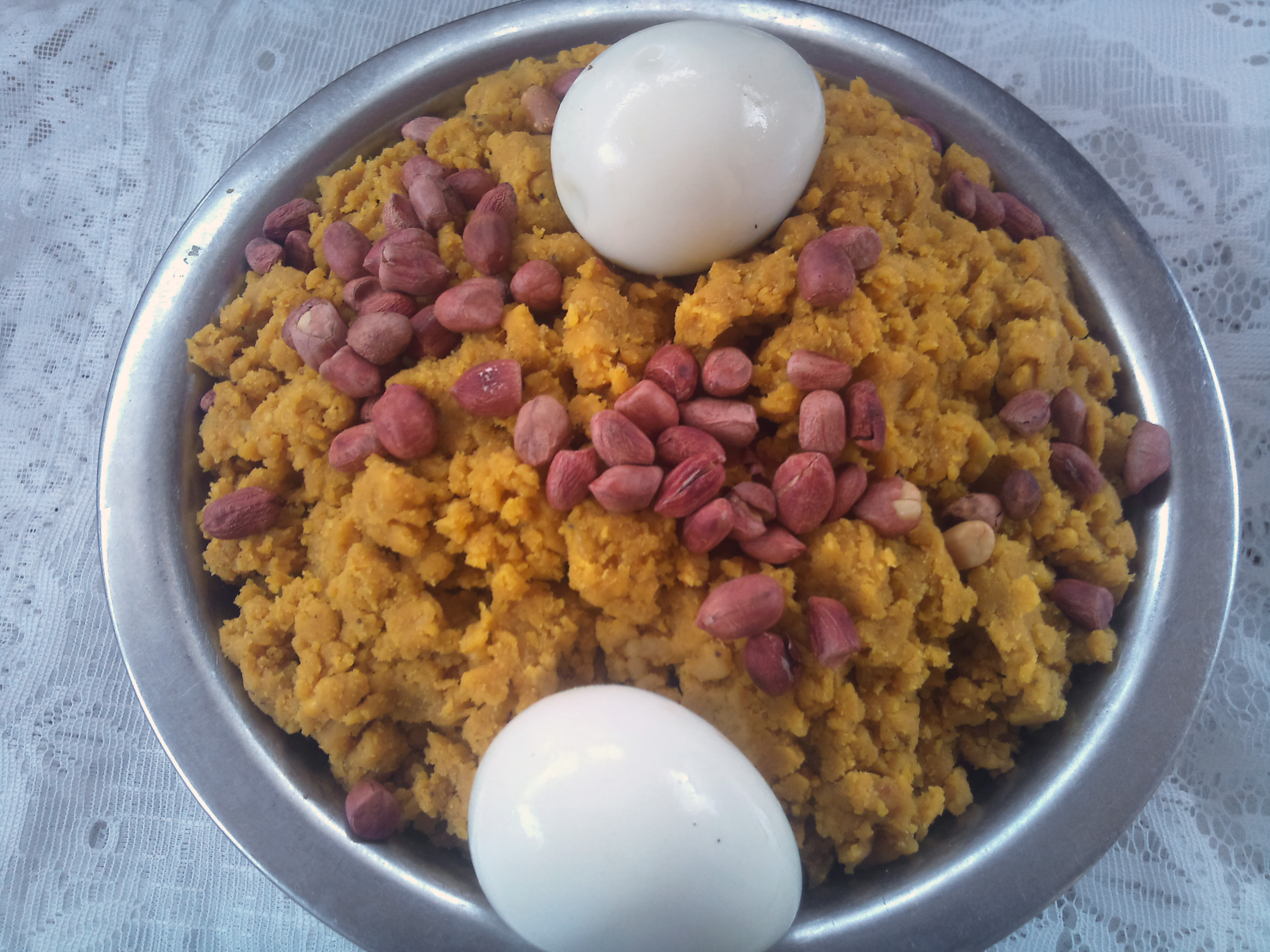
Etor is a popular dish in south Ghana, prepared with plantain or with yam boiled and mashed, and mixed with palm oil. Groundnuts (peanuts) and eggs are used to garnish the dish.

There are many sweet local foods that have been marginalized due to their low demand and long preparation process. Ghanaian sweet foods (or confectionery) may be fried, barbecued, boiled, roasted, baked or steamed. There is a popular belief in Ghana that overconsuming sugar can make men impotent, and any consumption will impact their libido.

Fried sweet foods include: kelewele (cubed and spiced ripe plantains, sometimes served with peanuts); koose (made from peeled beans) and its close twin acarajé or akara (made from unpeeled beans); maasa, pinkaaso, and bofrot or Puff-puff (made from wheat flour); waakye, dzowey, and nkate cake (made from peanuts); kaklo and tatale (ripe plantain fritters); kube cake and kube toffee (made from coconut); bankye krakro, gari biscuit, and krakye ayuosu (made from cassava); condensed milk; toffee; plantain chips or fried plantain; and wagashi(fried farmer's cheese).

Kebabs are popular barbecued foods and can be made from beef, goat, pork, soy flour, sausages, and guinea fowl. Other roasted savoury foods include roasted plantains, maize, yam and cocoyam.

Steamed fresh maize, yakeyake, kafa, akyeke, tubani, moimoi (bean cake), emo dokonu (rice cake), and esikyire dokonu (sweetened kenkey) are all examples of steamed and boiled foods, while sweet bread (plantain cake), meat pie similar to Jamaican patties, and empanadas are baked savoury foods. Aprapransa, eto (mashed yam), and atadwe milk (tiger nut juice) are other savory foods. Gari soakings are a modern favorite. It is a blend of gari (dried, roasted cassava), sugar, groundnut (peanut) and milk.

== Beverages ==
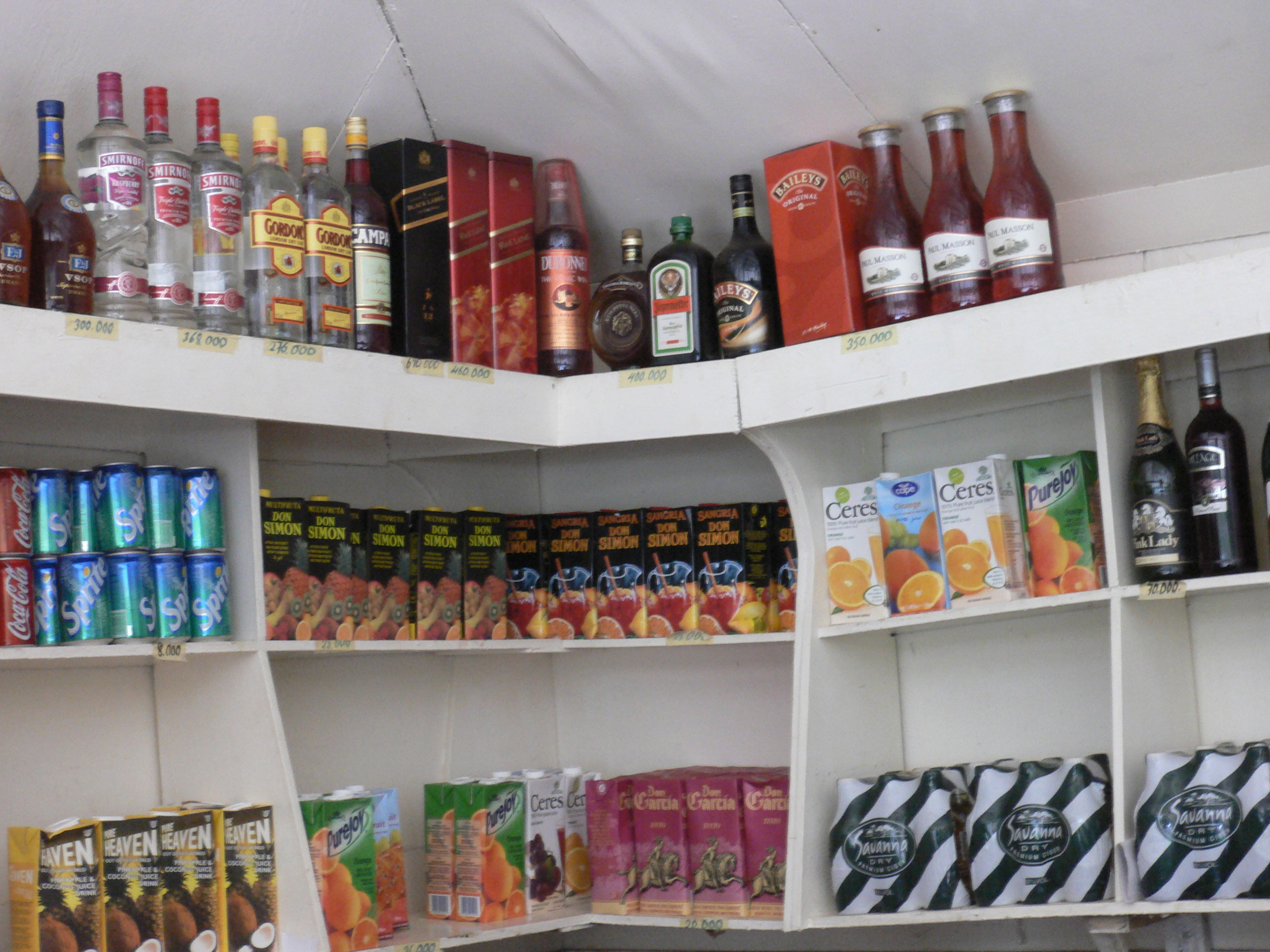
Ghanaian beverages at a convenience store in Ghana

In southern Ghana, Ghanaian drinks such as asaana (made from fermented maize) are common. Along Lake Volta and in southern Ghana, palm wine extracted from the palm tree can be found, but it ferments quickly, and then it is used to distill akpeteshie (a local gin). Akpeteshie can be distilled from molasses too. In northern Ghana, common non-alcoholic beverages include ice kenkey (made from refrigerated kenkey), bisaap/sorrel, toose, and lamujee (a spicy sweetened drink); pitoo (a local beer made of fermented millet) is an alcoholic beverage popular in northern Ghana.

In urban areas of Ghana, drinks may include fruit juice, cocoa drinks, fresh coconut water, yogurt, ice cream, carbonated drinks, malt drinks, and soy milk. In addition, Ghanaian distilleries produce alcoholic beverages from cocoa, malt, sugar cane, local medicinal herbs, and tree barks. They include bitters, liqueur, dry gins, beer, and aperitifs.

== Street foods in Ghana ==
Street food is very popular in both rural and urban areas of Ghana. Many Ghanaian families patronize street food vendors, from whom all kinds of foods can be bought, including staple foods such as kenkey, red red and waakye. Other savoury foods, such as meat kebabs, boiled corn cob, boflot/bofrot and roasted plantain (Kofi Brokeman) with groundnuts are sold mainly by street food vendors.

Ice kenkey is a popular chilled dessert sold by street vendors in open-air markets.

Kosua ne meko (eggs with pepper) is a street food sold mostly by street vendors.

== Common Ghanaian dishes ==
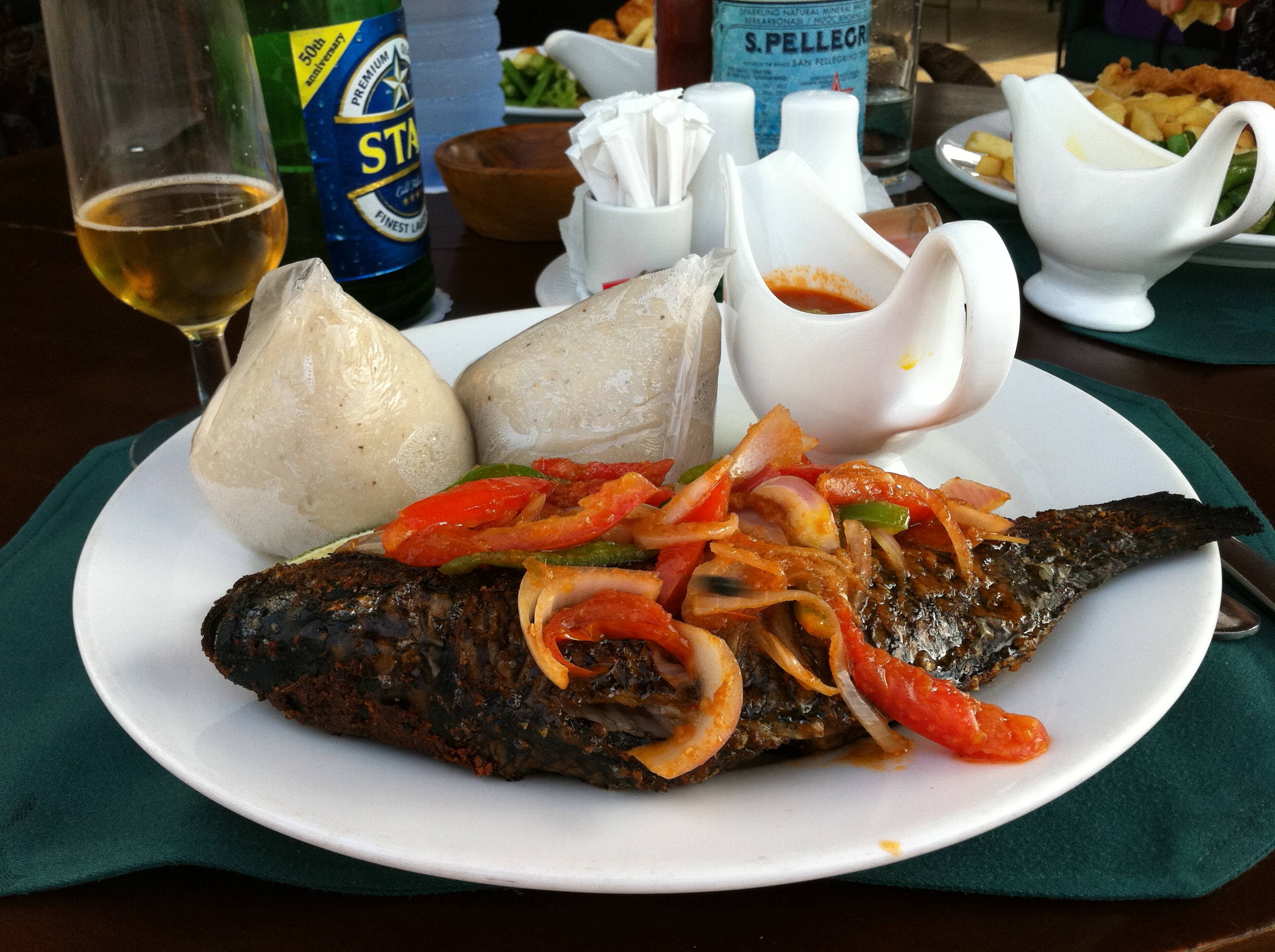
Banku and grilled tilapia fish

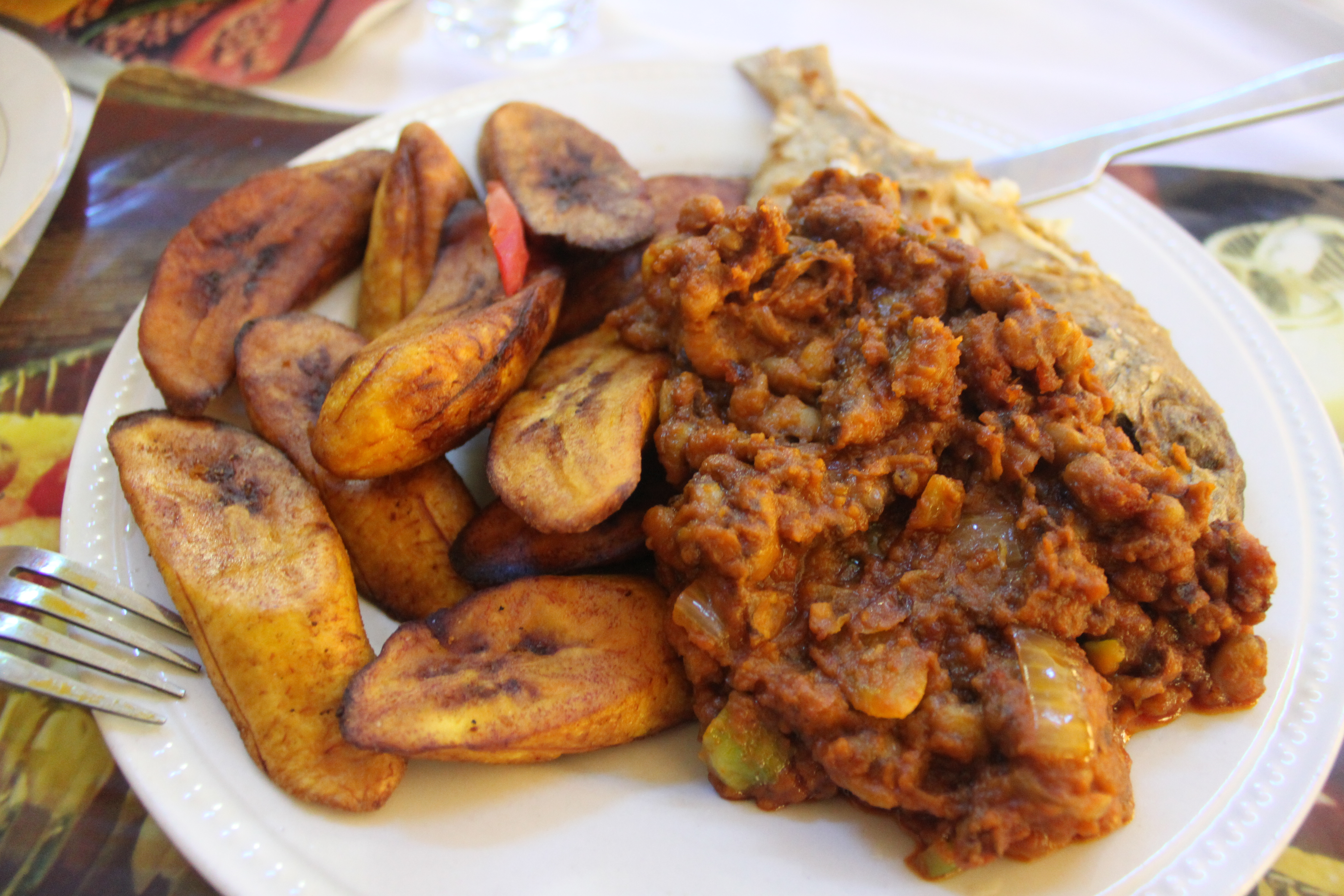
Red-red: bean and fish stew with fried plantain

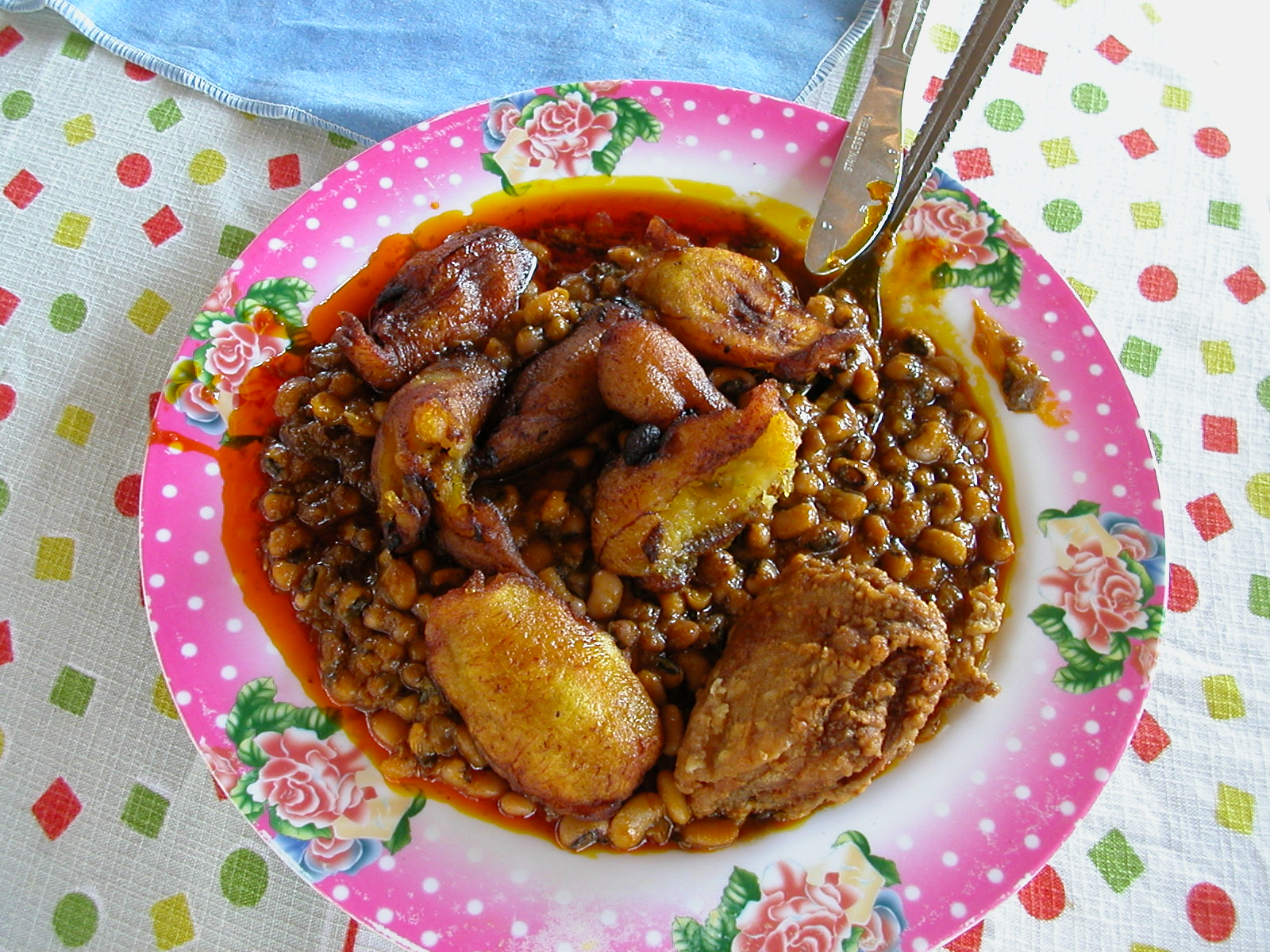
Beans, plantain, and chicken

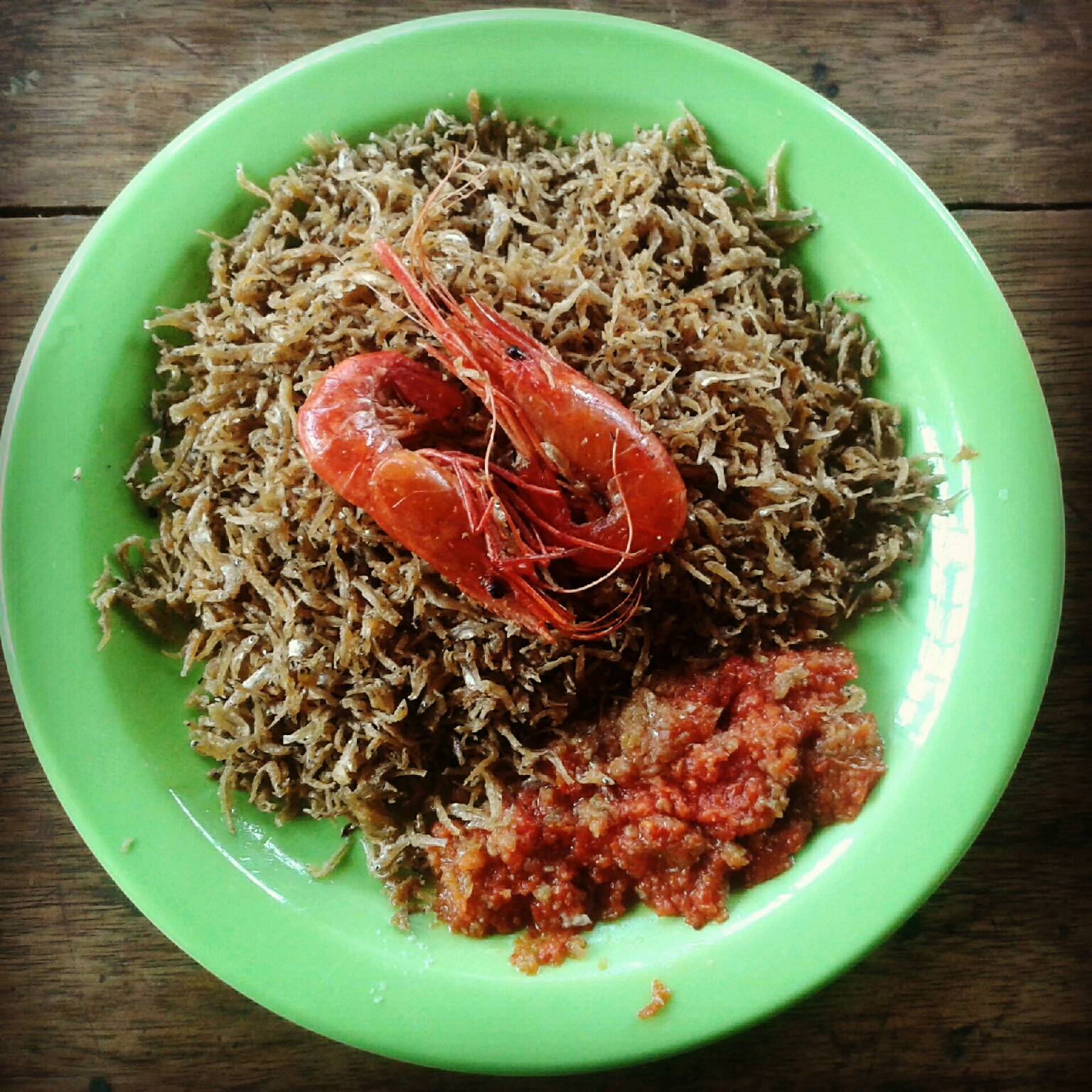
"One Man Thousand": cooked shrimp and fried Tanganyika sardine

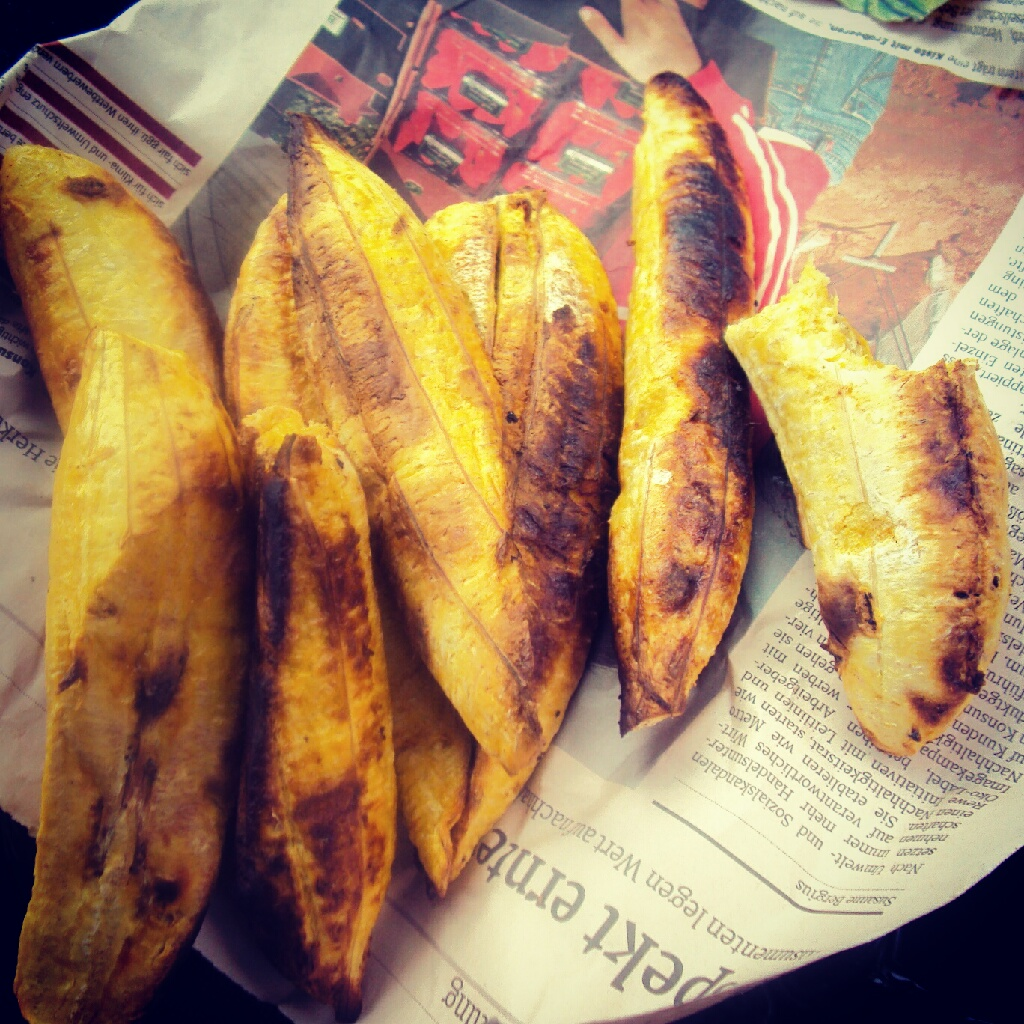
Ghanaian Kɔkɔ a y'atoto (nickname: Kofi Broke Man) charcoal-roasted ripe plantain

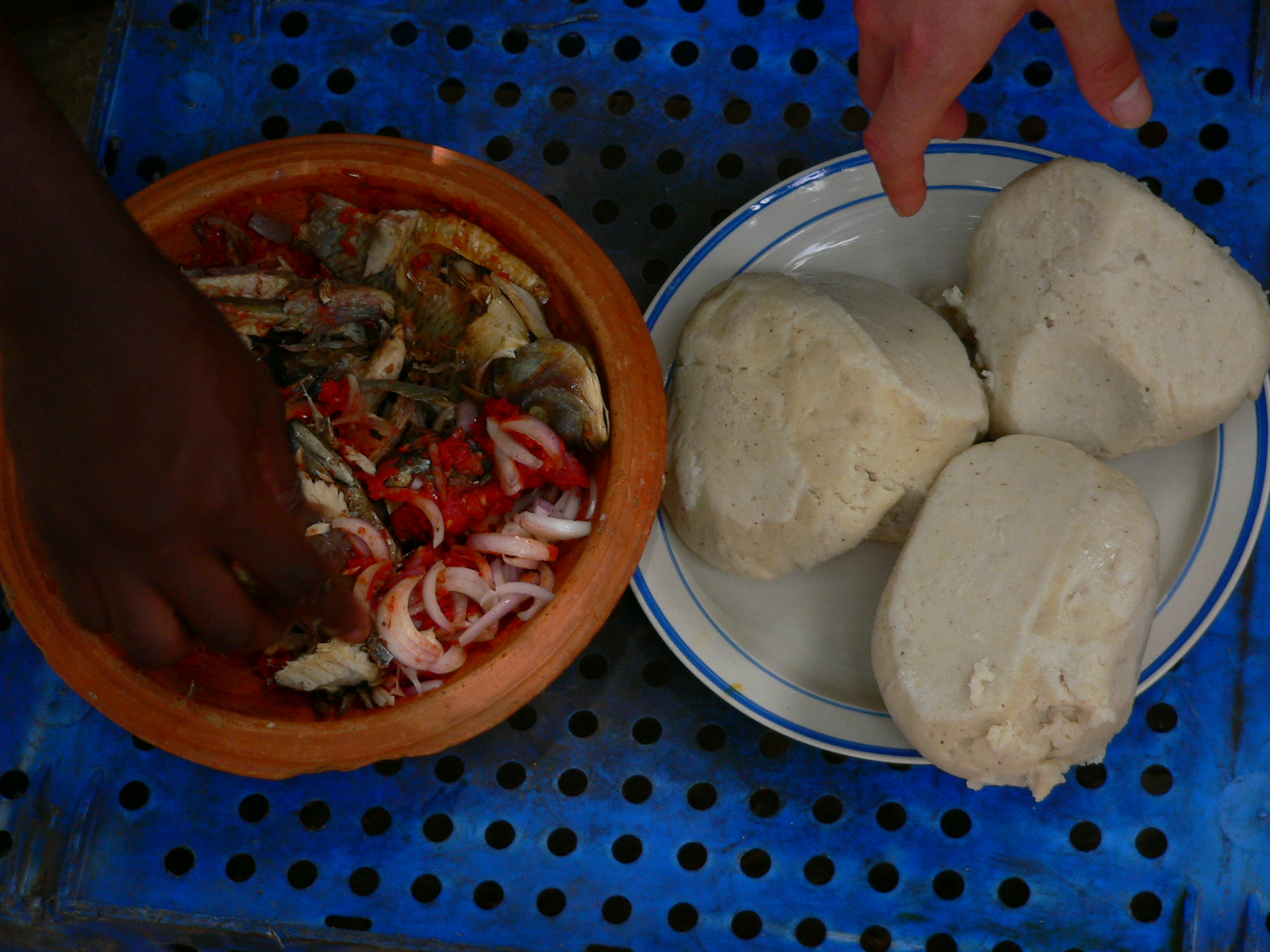
Ghanaian Banku Ne Mako (banku and pepper-tomato sauce)

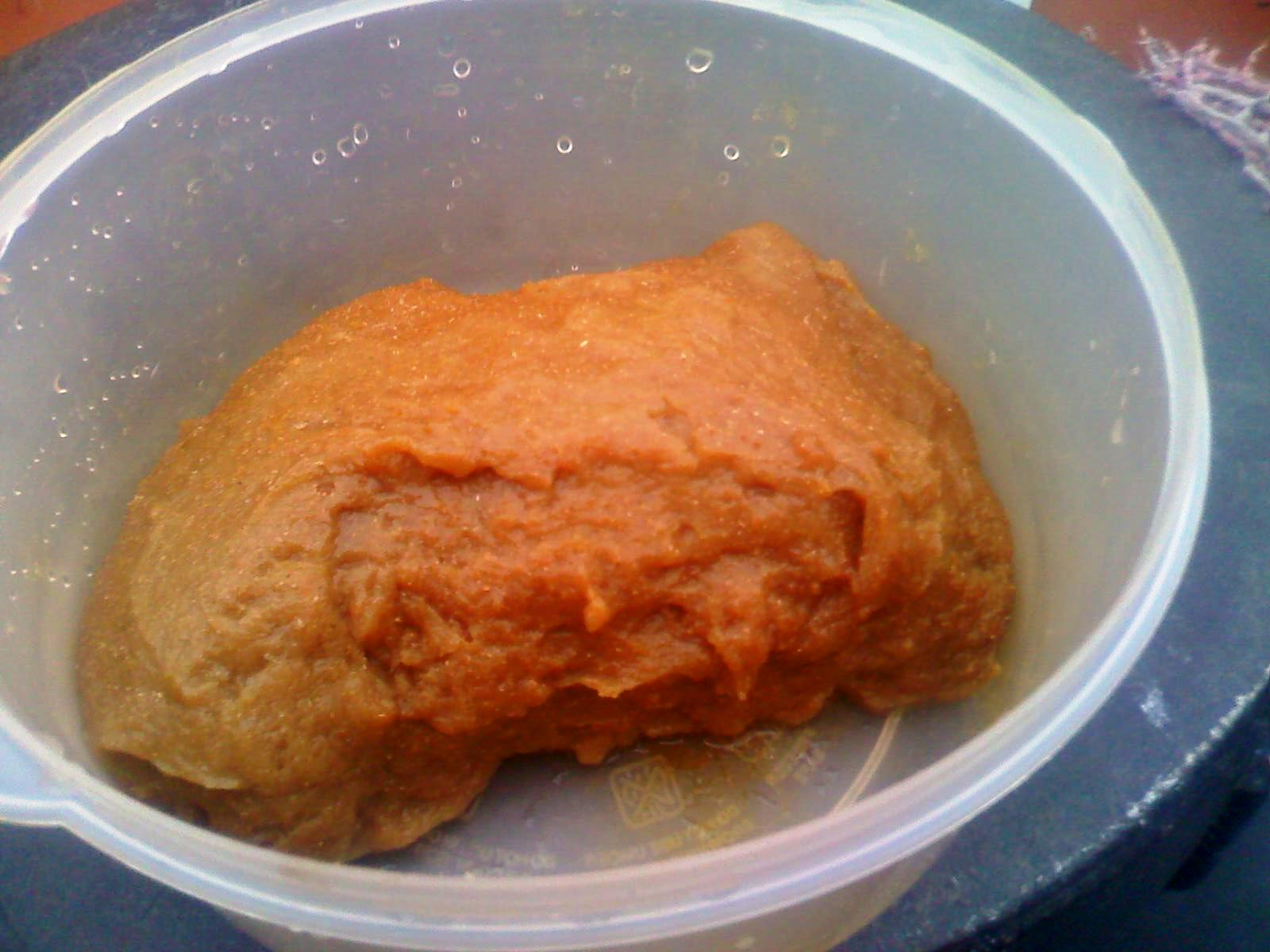
Ghanaian style konkonte

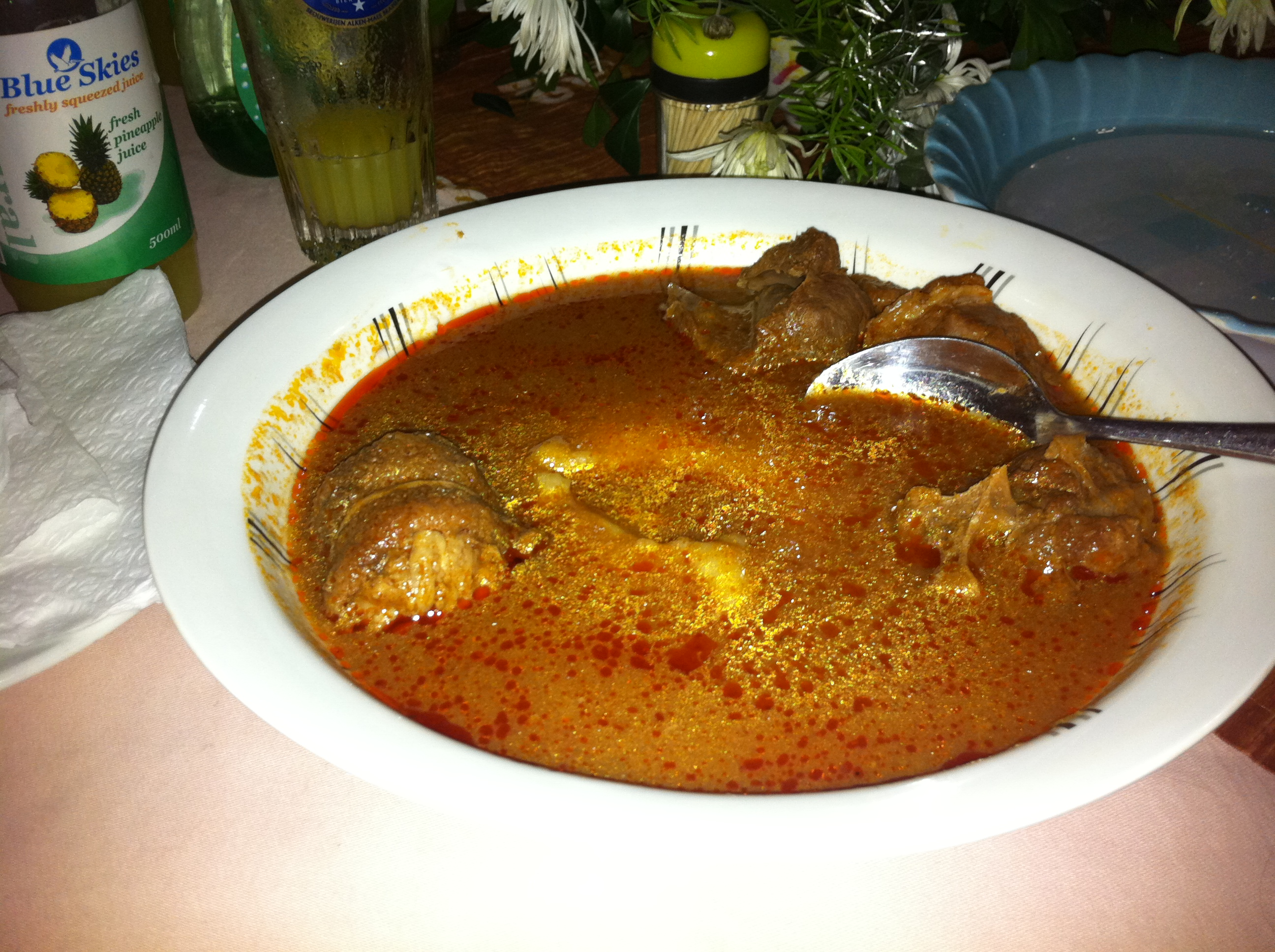
Ghanaian fufu in palmnut soup with goat

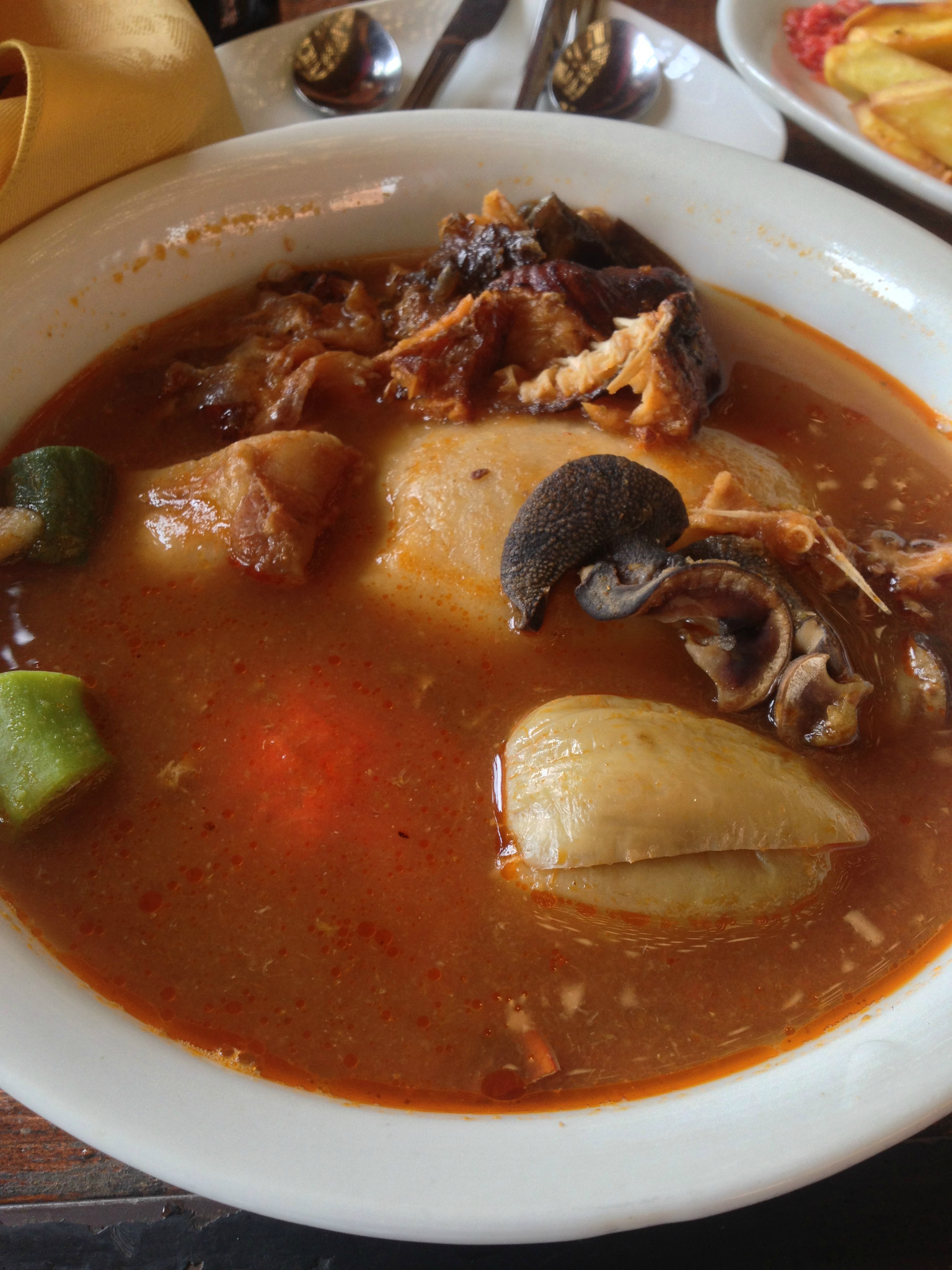
Fufu and light tomato soup with meat

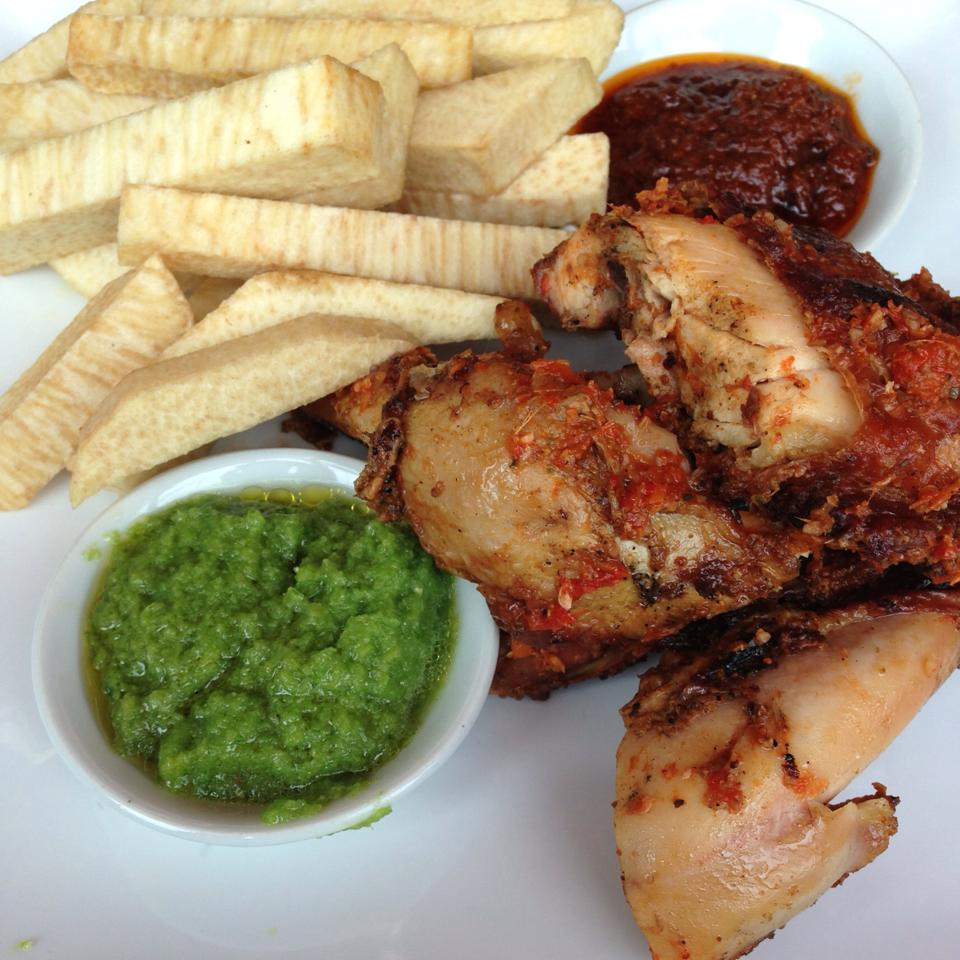
Fried yam with spicy chicken and kpakpo shito (ground green peppers)

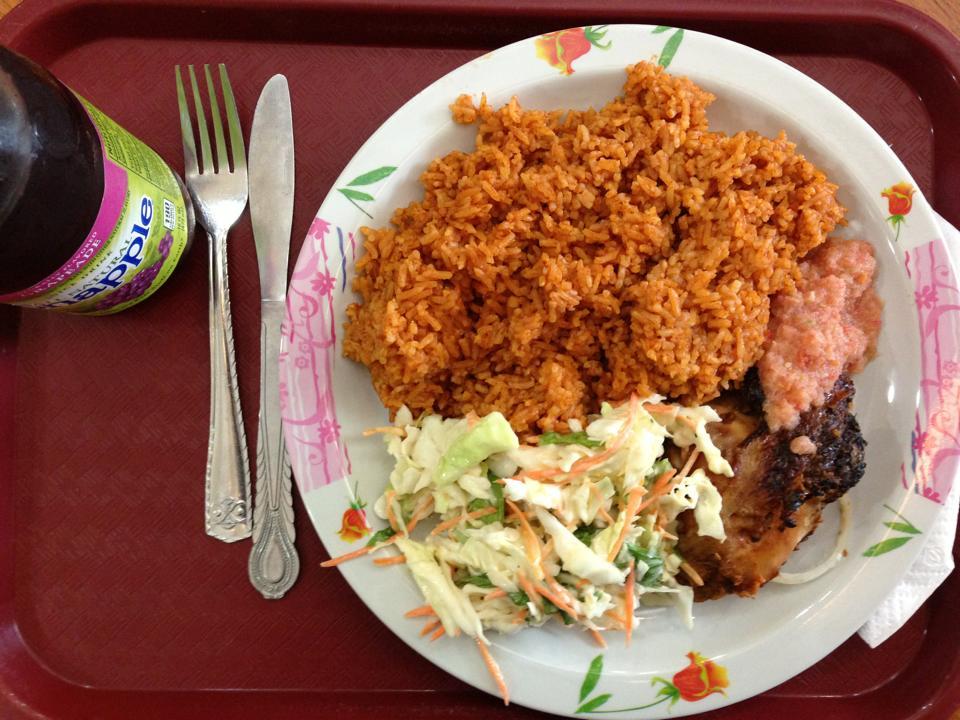
Jollof rice with coleslaw and barbecue chicken

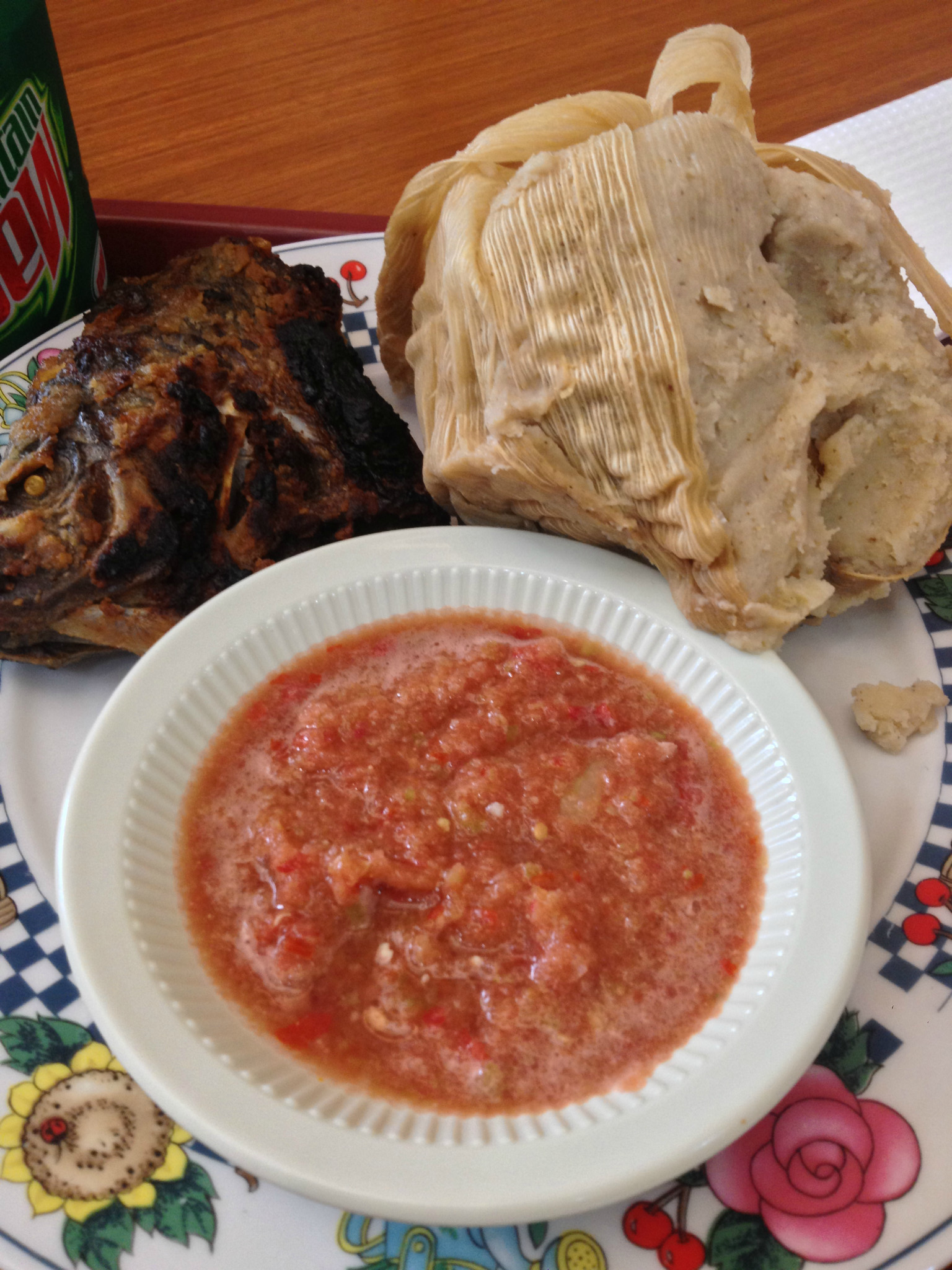
Kenkey with fried fish and chili pepper

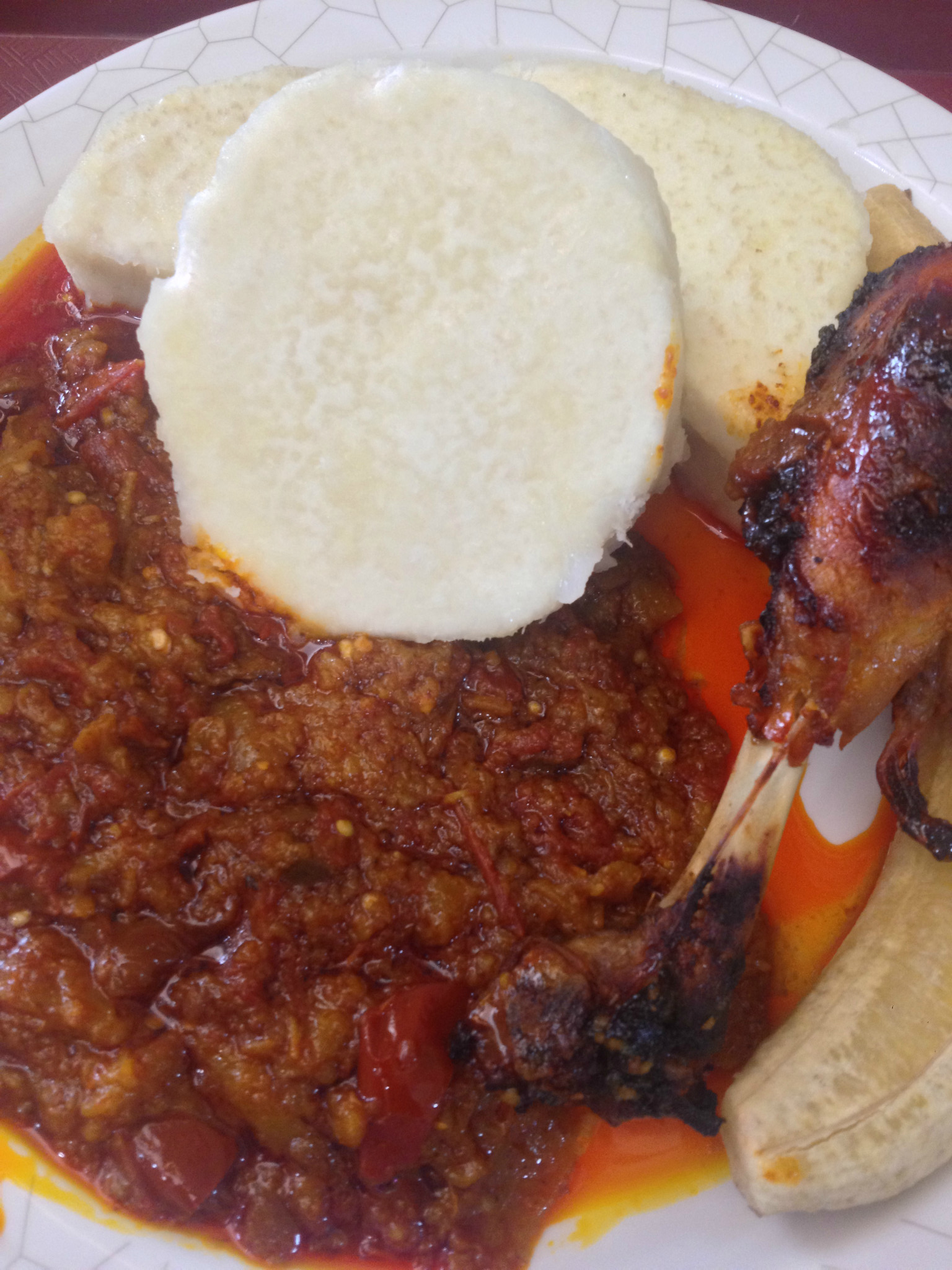
Cooked yam and plantain, with "garden egg" (aubergine) stew and chicken

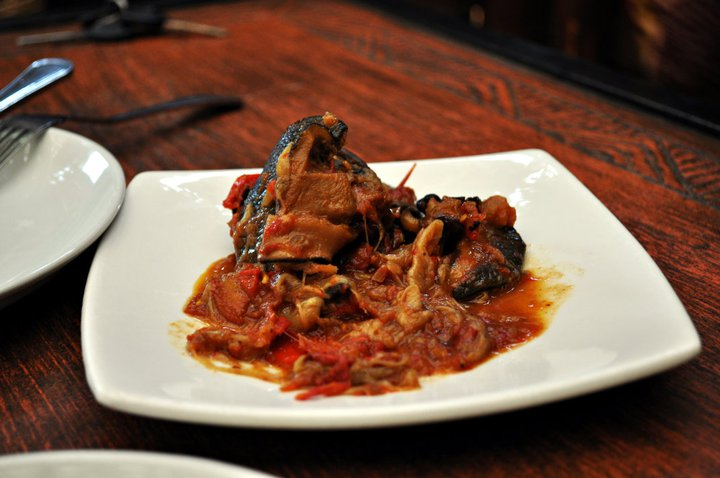
Ghanaian style spicy sauce

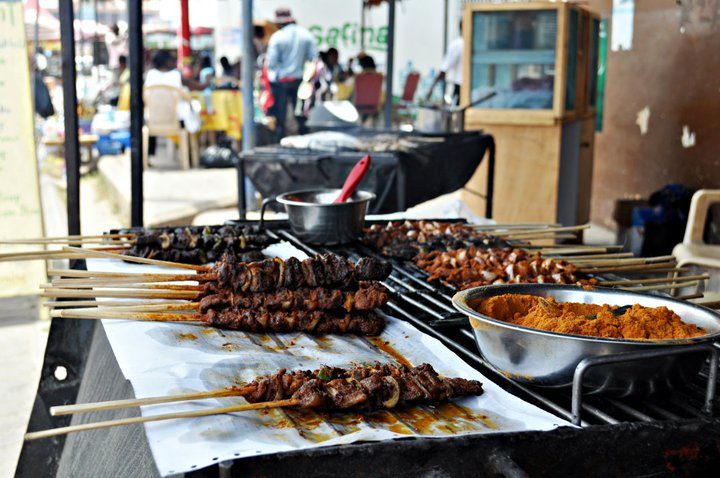
Ghanaian style spicy grilled kebab

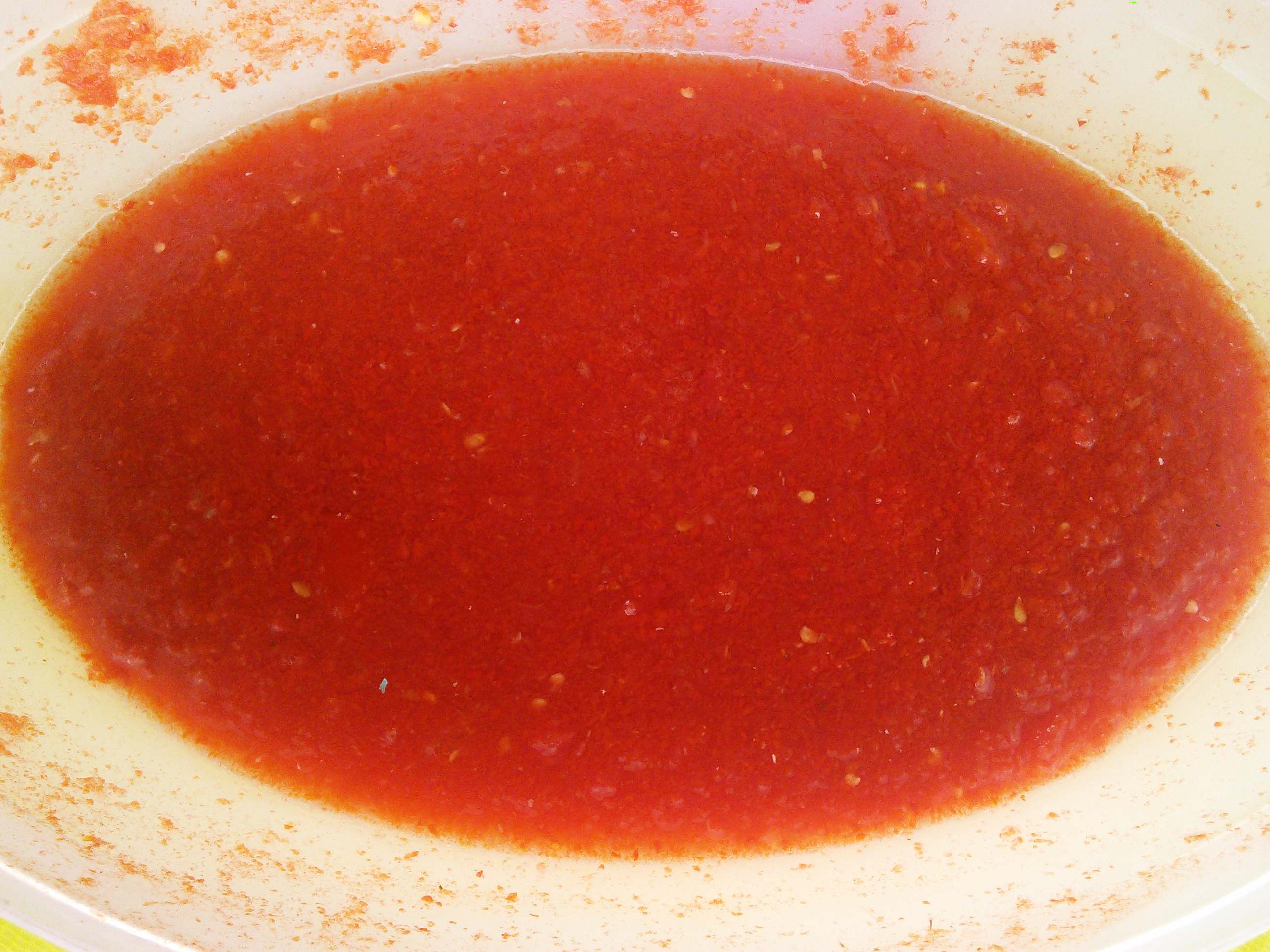
Ground red pepper, a Ghanaian delicacy, mainly an accompaniment for banku and kenkey

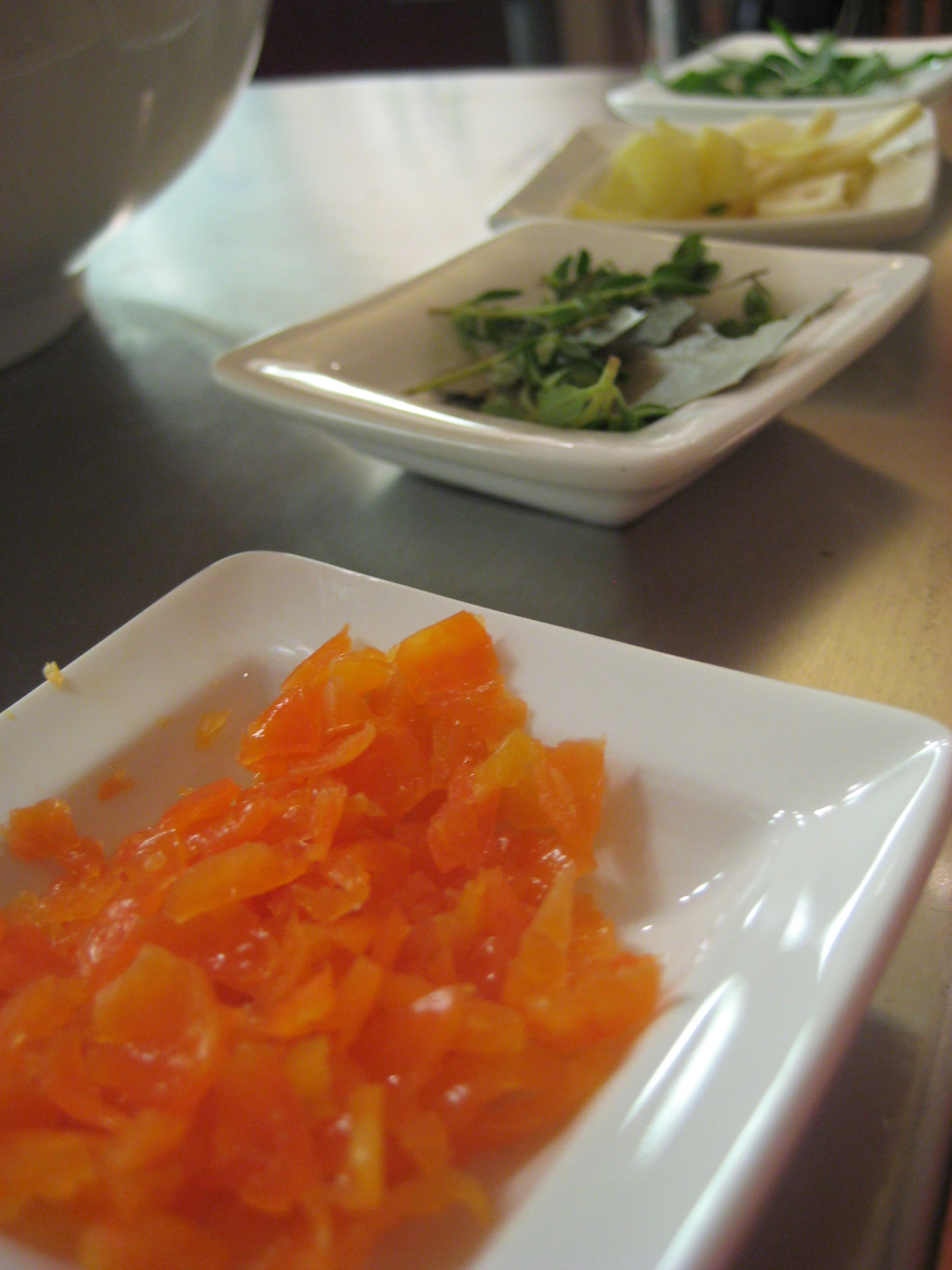
Tubaani

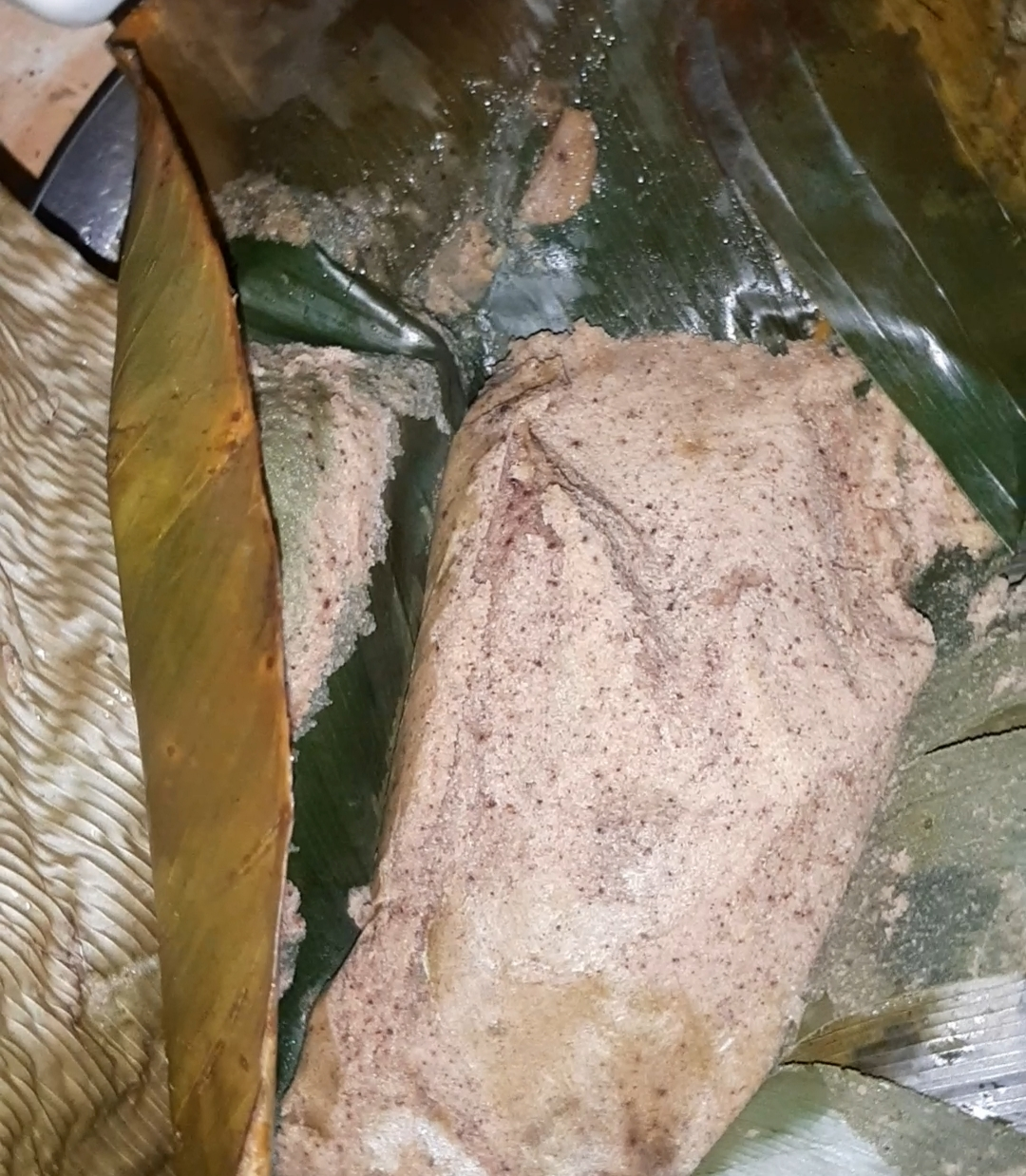
Tubaani wrapped in the leaves of Ewe eran

== See also ==
- Chop bar
- West African cuisine
- List of African cuisines
- La Tante DC10 Restaurant
