= Light soup =

Spicy soup from Ghana

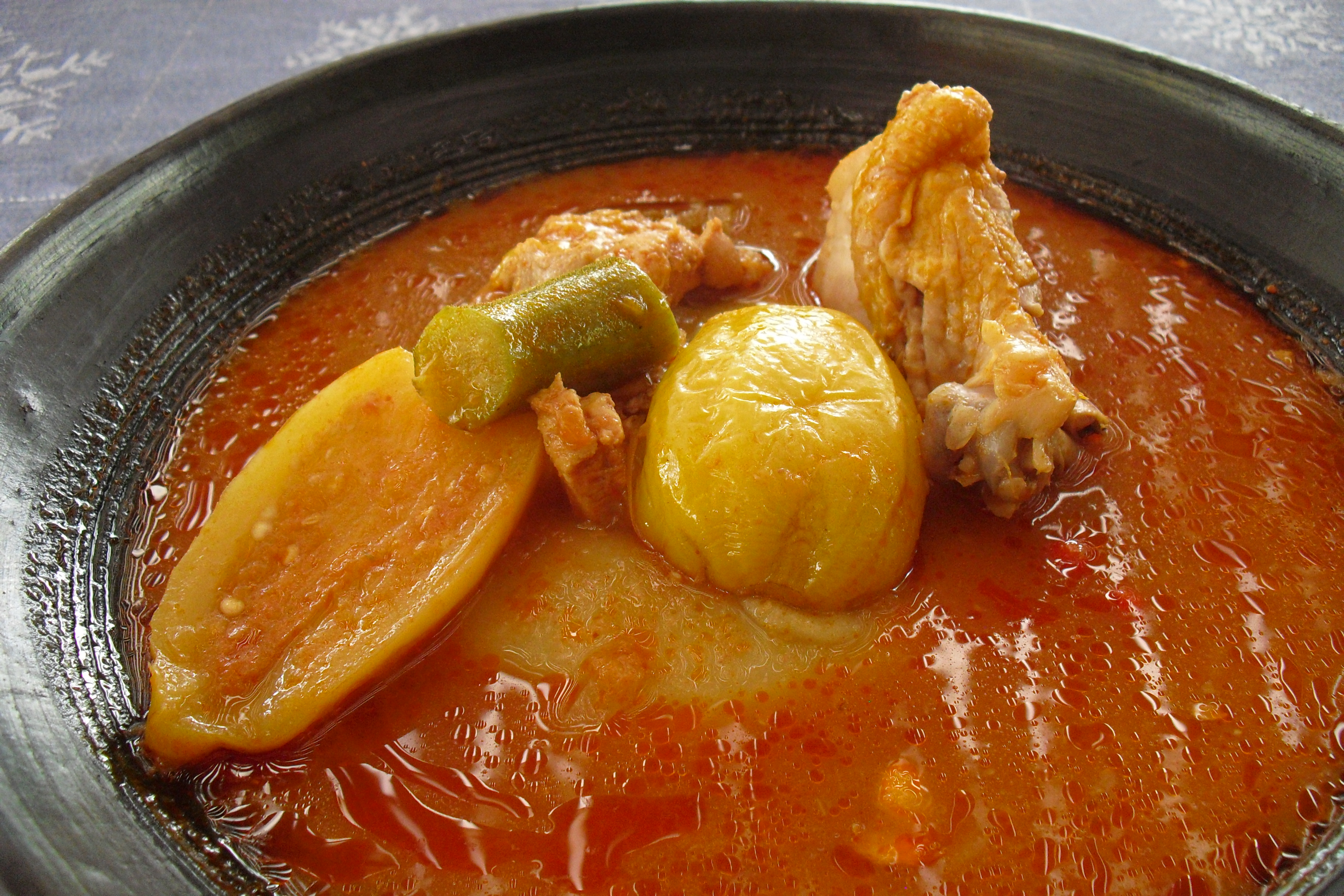
- Place of origin: Ghana
- Serving temperature: Hot
- Main ingredients: Tomatoes, tomato paste, chili peppers

Light soup is a local indigenous soup of the Akan people of Ghana. The soup is called "light" because the dark-colored broth is thin. Originally formulated as a tomato-based seafood light soup called nkra nkra (or aklor) for fishermen at the coast of Accra, over the course of time it evolved into a soup prepared with both fish and a meat such as goat's meat, lamb, or beef, or exclusively the meat of the livestock of choice. The GaDangmes call it toolo wonu in the Ga language, and their neighbouring Akans call aponkye nkrakra in the Twi language.

The local indigenous light soup of the GaDangme (or Ga) people led to the formulation of GaDangme (or Ga) meals such as:

- Komi ke aklo (or aklor), garnished with cooked blended okra
- Banku ke aklo (or aklor), garnished with cooked blended okra
- Yele (chops of boiled yam) ke aklo (or aklor) and similar meals of the toolo wonu version, such as yele ke toolo wonu, atomo (chops of boiled potatoes) ke toolo wonuf, and others

== Mode of serving ==
It can be served with fufu, banku, kokonte, boiled rice or yam. Boiled okra can be added to it.

== Ingredients ==
The ingredients include tomatoes, tomato paste, chili peppers, onion, salt, ginger, garden eggs, and dry or salted fish and/or meat.

== Method of preparation ==
Light soup is prepared by steaming fish or meat with seasonings, onion, garlic and ginger in a saucepan. Tomato paste is then added. Chili peppers, garden eggs and tomatoes are boiled, blended and added to the saucepan. Water is added to bring the soup to its desired thickness. More onions and tomatoes are added, then blended, and the soup is left to simmer. It is then served with dishes like fufu, banku, or konkonte.

== See also ==
- Ghanaian cuisine
- List of soups
