= Red red =

Ghanaian dish

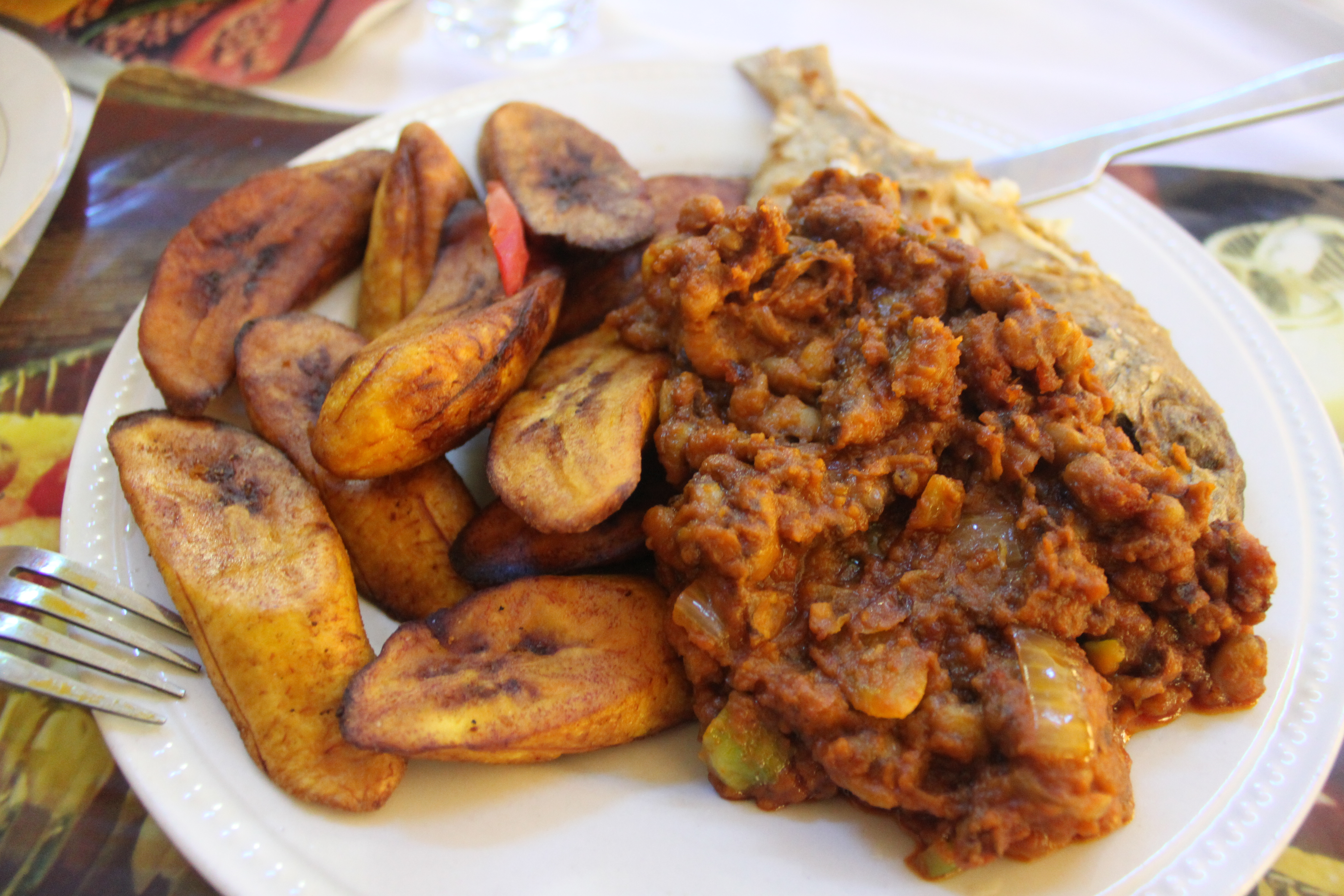
- Ghanaian Red red with fish
- Place of origin: Ghana
- Created by: GaDangme (or Ga) people
- Serving temperature: Hot
- Main ingredients: black-eyed peas (beans), tomatoes, onions, palm oil, red chili, pepper, and salt

Red red is a Ghanaian dish composed of black-eyed peas, cooked in palm oil or other vegetable oil with plantain. The dish derives its name from the red color it takes on from the red palm oil (zomi) and the fried plantain. Red red typically consists of fish such as tinned mackerel or pilchards, black-eyed peas, Scotch bonnet peppers, onions, oil and tomatoes. It is commonly known in Ghana as "Yɔ kɛ Gari". Though often served with fish, red red can also be vegetarian. It can be served with fried plantain, avocado, and rice or garri for a complete meal.

== Ingredients ==
- 250 grams dry black eyed beans
- 2.5 dl palm oil (the red type)
- 4 red onions, medium sized
- 1 small box tomato paste
- 1-2 red chili
- 2-3 cm fresh ginger
- 3 cloves of garlic
- 5 tomatoes
- 2-3 dl water
- 2-3 ts salt
- pinch of sugar

== See also ==
- Ghanaian cuisine
