= Ice kenkey =

Chilled dessert from Ghana

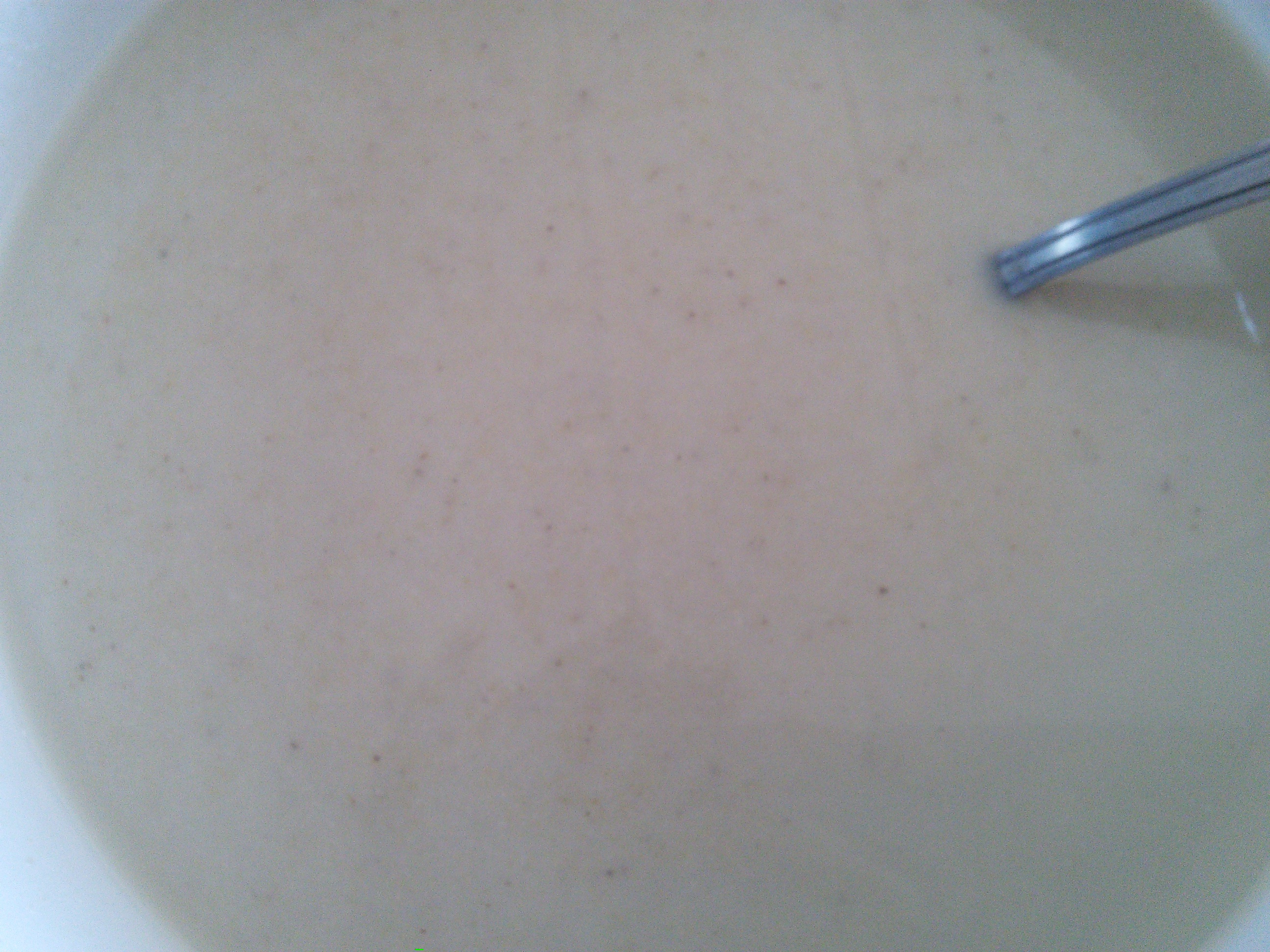
- Course: Snack
- Place of origin: Ghana
- Serving temperature: Cold
- Main ingredients: Kenkey, water, sugar, milk or groundnuts

Ice kenkey (also known as Mashed Ke/ Mashed kenkey) is a popular Ghanaian dessert made from kenkey, a steamed dumpling made from fermented cornmeal. It is often sold as a street food in Ghana.. Ice kenkey is enjoyed alone or with bread and bofrot/boflot.

== Ingredients ==
- Fante Kenkey
- Water
- Milk
- Sugar
- Peanut/Groundnut
- Ice

== Preparation ==
Kenkey is produced by steeping grains of maize in water for about two days, before they are then milled and kneaded into a dough. The dough is allowed to ferment for a few days, before part of the dough is cooked and then mixed with uncooked dough. Ice kenkey is produced by breaking kenkey into pieces, milling it, and then mixing it with water, sugar, powdered milk, and ice. Some producers use roasted groundnuts instead of milk.

== Hygiene ==
Ice kenkey sold by street food vendors in Ghana is prone to E. coli and Staphylococcus aureus contamination due to manual operations and poor hygienic practices in the production process, as well as a lack of pasteurization. Municipal authorities have implemented an ice kenkey production training manual and created task forces to ensure food safety.
