= Braised rice =

Ghanaian style of cooking rice

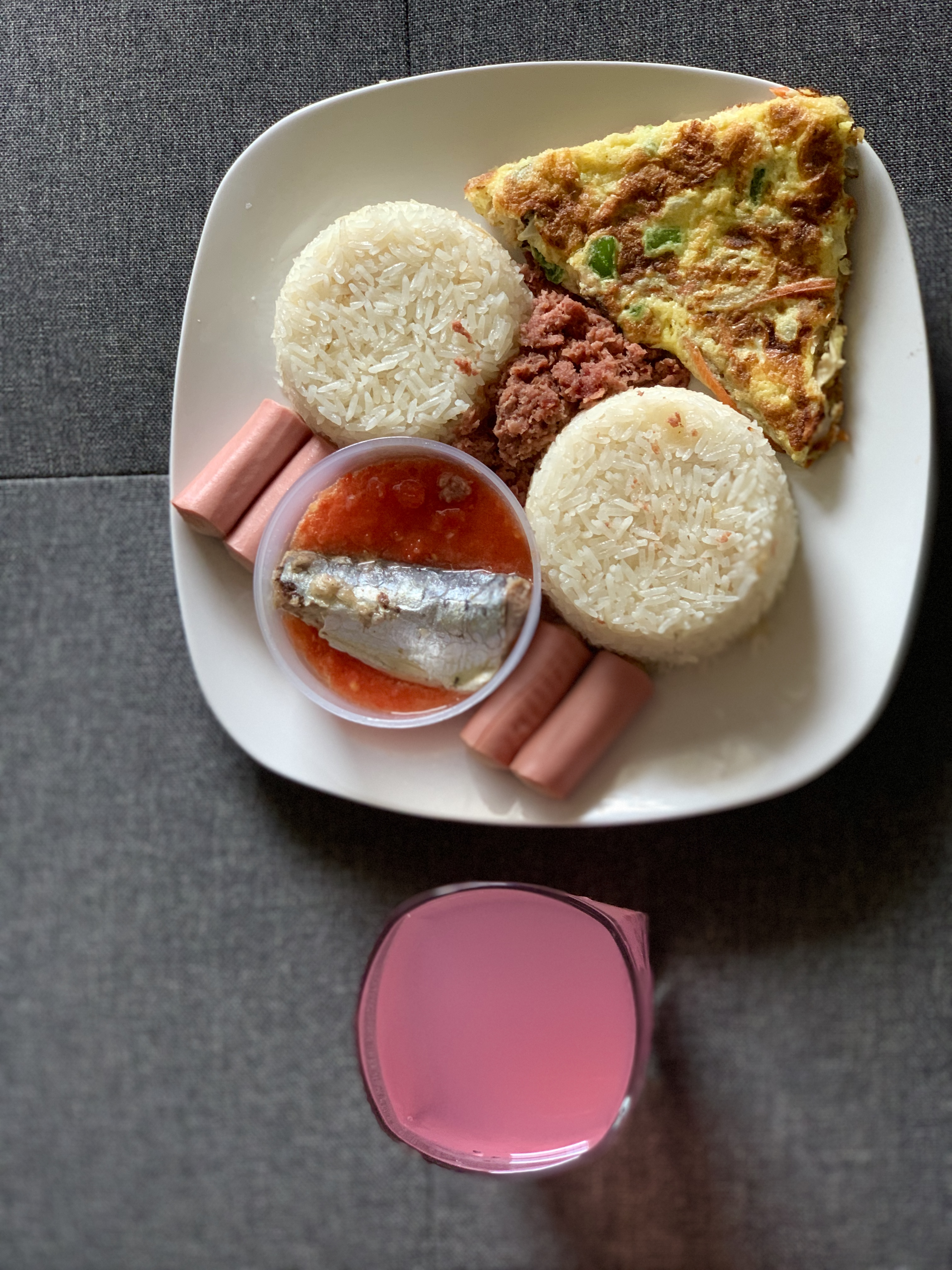
- Place of origin: Ghana
- Created by: Ghanaians
- Serving temperature: Hot
- Main ingredients: Rice, tomatoes,, onions, pepper, and salt

Braised rice is a Ghanaian style of cooking rice. It is known as angwa moo in the Akan language, literally "oil rice" or omɔ kɛ fɔ(omor ker for) in the Ga language. It is prepared with few ingredients. and is usually balanced with some vegetables and any other accompaniment to balance the diet. The braised rice is served with ground pepper or shito, and served with fried eggs, omelette or sardine.

== Ingredients ==
- Rice
- Cooking oil or sunflower oil
- Chopped onions
- Eggs
- Chopped tomatoes
- Pepper
- salt to taste
- Water
- Salted beef or Tolo beef or salted tilapia optional
- A tin of sardine, optional
- Sausage
- Spaghetti
- Carrot

== See also ==
- Ghanaian cuisine
