= Etor =

Ghanaian food

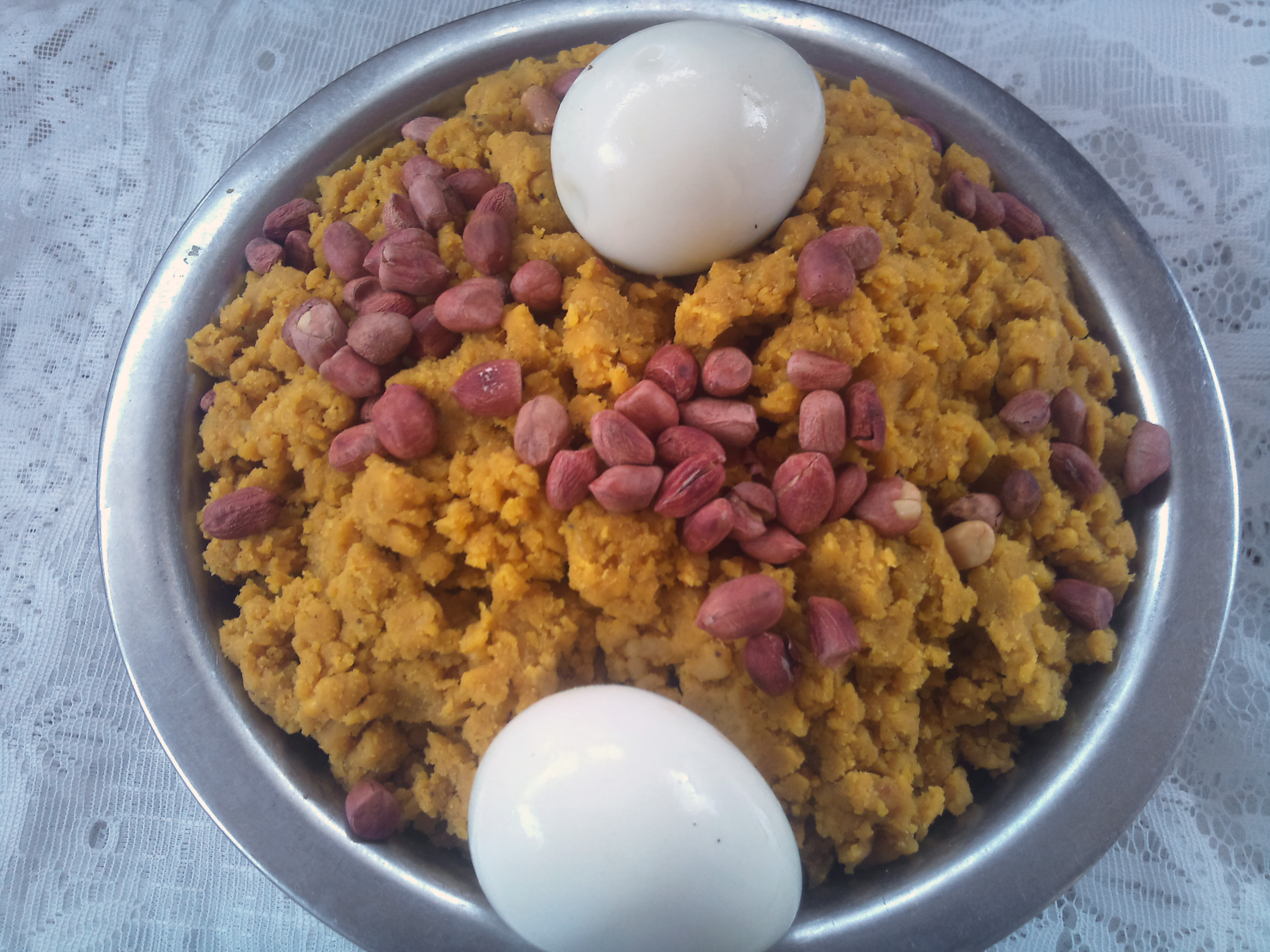
- Otor served with egg and peanuts
- Place of origin: Ghana
- Created by: Ga-Adangbe people
- Serving temperature: Hot
- Main ingredients: Mashed plantain or yam, pepper, palm oil, smoked fish, onions, salt

Otor (also Eto, Oto or Otoor) is a food formulated by the GaDangme (Ga) tribe of Ghana for special occasions such as the "Twins Festival" (Akweley Suma), Outdooring Naming Ceremony and 8th Day Abrahamic circumcision. The practice is widely observed by other tribes including the Akans.

== Forms ==
The food comes in various forms; including with mashed yams or mashed plantains. GaDangme Etor is the most popular of the sacred foods prepared during the "Twins Festival". Others such as naji enyo or naji ejwe (which is traditionally rice or yam with tomatoes-based-stew, garnished with boiled eggs and kelewele) are not as popular.

== Etymology ==
Eto (also spelled etor) is an Akan corruption of the actual name oto (or otoor), a Ga-language word dating to the 1800s.

== See also ==
- Ghanaian cuisine
