= Aprapransa =

Ghanaian dish featuring cornflour and soup

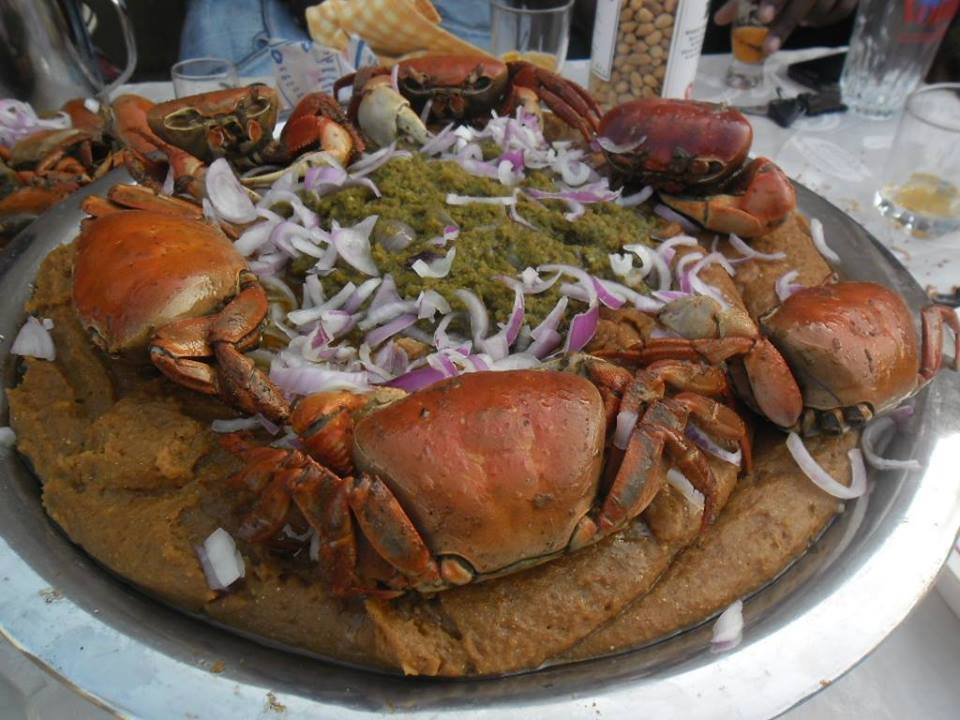
- Aprapransa garnished with crabs
- Place of origin: Ghana
- Created by: GaDangme(or Ga) people
- Serving temperature: Hot
- Main ingredients: Roasted corn flour, palm oil, vegetables, seafood
- Variations: Banga soup

Aprapransa, originally called 'akplijii' (or 'akplidzi') is a Ghanaian GaDangme(or Ga) dish prepared by heat mixing (or blending) roasted corn flour with palm nut soup.

Palm Nut Soup is an important base ingredient in the preparation of Akplijii. It is also an ancient sacred soup of the GaDangme people and is always prepared as a complement to another sacred corn flour meal called Kpokpoi (or Kpekpele) during an Ancient Religious Hebraic Harvest Festival called Homowo. The GaDangme people brought these practices along with them to Ancient Ghana and taught all the tribes how to prepare Palm Nut Soup. Outside Ghana, other tribes in Nigeria such as the Yorubas, Igbos have a variation of palm nut soup called Banga Soup. Over the course of time, the knowledge of the preparation of Palm Nut Soup in Ghana became common and it lost it sacred status.

The GaDangme people have from ancient time to present day, used the palm tree in a number of sacred ways; namely, to prepare Palm Nut Soup, the burning of the dry figs as incense for spiritual cleansing, and to ward-off evil spirits, to build new houses every year made up of new palm tree branches.

The sacred uses of palm tree is not unique to the GaDangme(or Ga)-Tribe, and is a common practice among several other tribes in the 'Congo-Niger Family'(or Bantu-Zone) of Africa. Akplijii is a food that is served on special occasions and it is feared to go extinct.

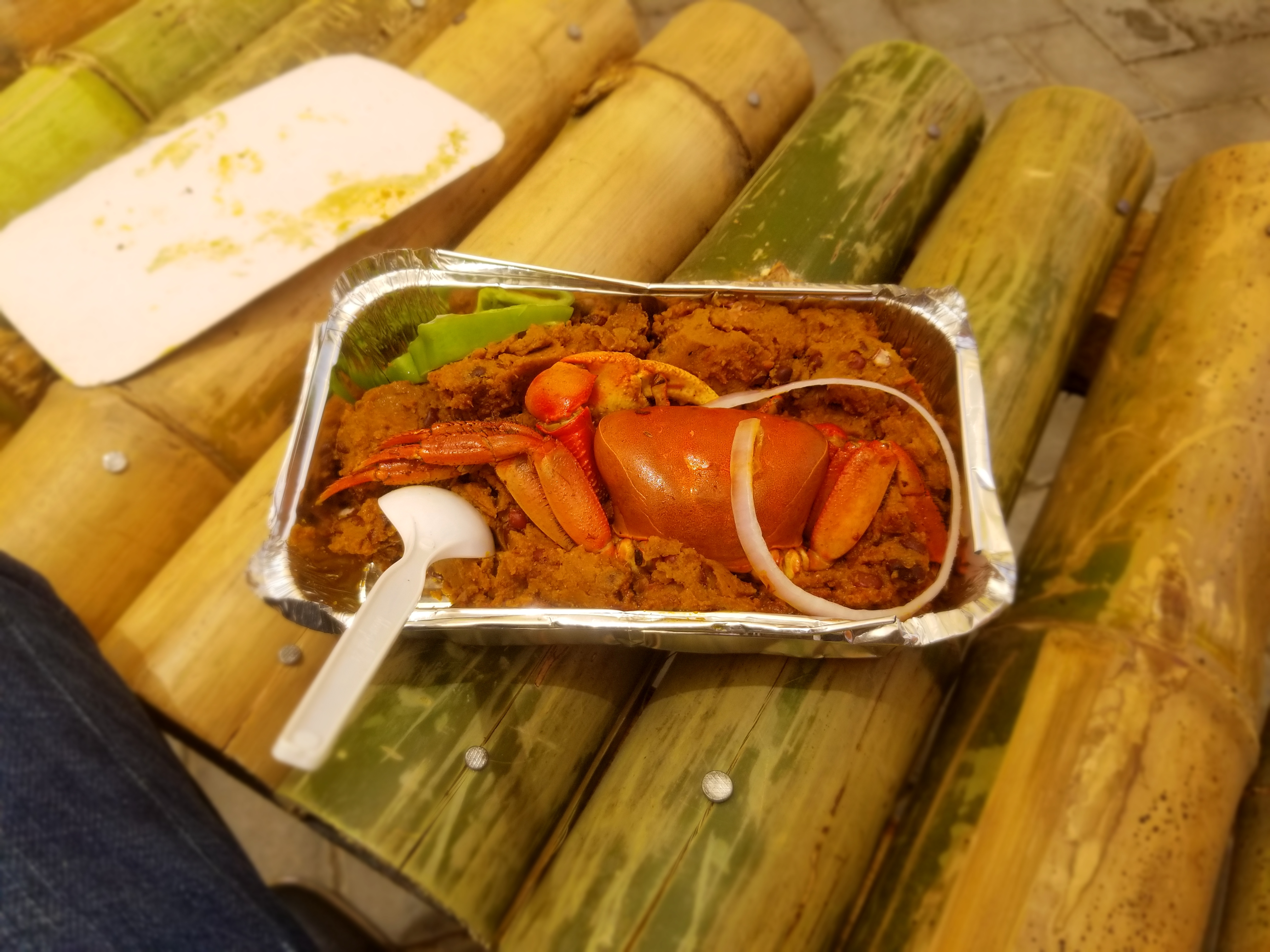
Aprapransa in a Pack

Aprapransa as a complete meal is not a food that is commonly found on the streets of Ghana or is prepared every day in the house. It is usually served by the Akan tribe on special occasions such as marriage ceremonies, naming ceremonies, birthday celebrations, family cookouts, etc. Its name derived from the fact that it is a complete meal with its soup/stew integrated that one only needs to wipe their hand (prapra wo nsa) to eat.

== Ingredients ==
The main ingredients are roasted corn flour (Tom brown) and palmnut or palm oil. Other ingredients include beans, vegetables such as tomatoes, onion, pepper, ginger, or garlic. It features seafood such as smoked fish, dried fish, salted fish or crabs.

Roasted corn flour can either be purchased at Ghanaian markets or made from plain corn flour in a pan.

== See also ==
- Ghanaian cuisine
