= Mpoto mpoto =

Ghanaian food

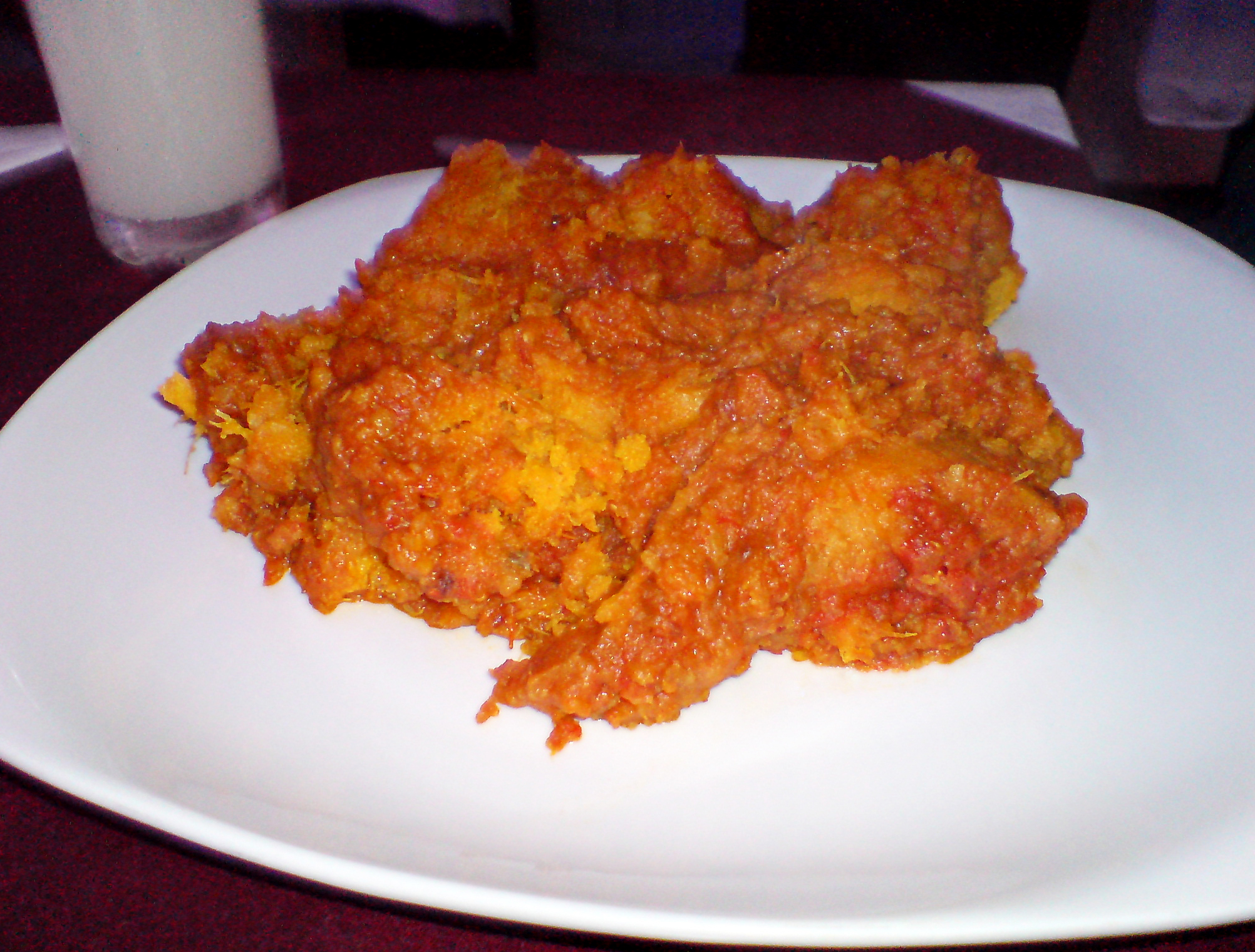
- Yam pottage Mpoto mpoto
- Alternative names: Yam pottage; asaro
- Course: Pepper, stew, soup
- Place of origin: Ghana
- Serving temperature: Hot
- Main ingredients: Water, yam or cocoyam, palm oil, onion, tomatoes, pepper, fish, salt

Mpoto mpoto is a Ghanaian cuisine made from cocoyam or yam. It is also known as yam pottage and asaro (Yoruba language) by Nigerians. It is made from several ingredients including fish and onion.
