= Garden egg =

Garden egg is an African and Caribbean name for the fruit, eaten as a vegetable, of any of three plants of the genus Solanum:

- The eggplant or aubergine, Solanum melongena.
- Some varieties of the bitter tomato, scarlet eggplant, or other names, Solanum aethiopicum.
- The African, Surinamese, or Vietnamese eggplant, Solanum macrocarpon.
