= Asaana =

Ghanaian corn drink

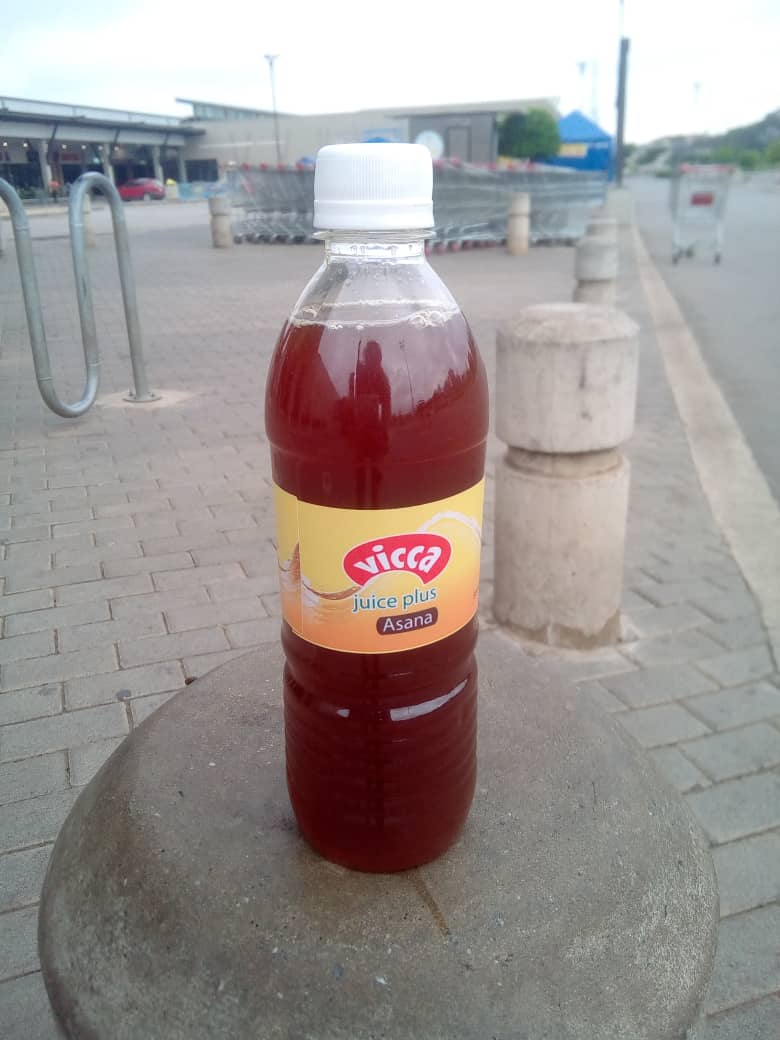
A picture of a bottled Asaana

Asaana (also known as Aliha or Liha) is a non-alcoholic, caramelized corn drink made from fermented corn and caramelized sugar. It originated from the Greater Accra region of Ghana. It is also referred to as Elewonyo in other parts of Ghana and known in many countries as corn beer drink. It can be served chilled, either plain or with milk.

== Ingredients and preparation ==
Asaana has three main ingredients, fermented corn, sugar and water. Fermentation is achieved by crushing and soaking the corn for days in water and then boiling until the foam clears. Sugar is then boiled in water to a dark brown color. The water from the boiled corn is strained and mixed with the sugar to form the drink.
