= Tubaani =

Ghanaian black-eyed pea dish

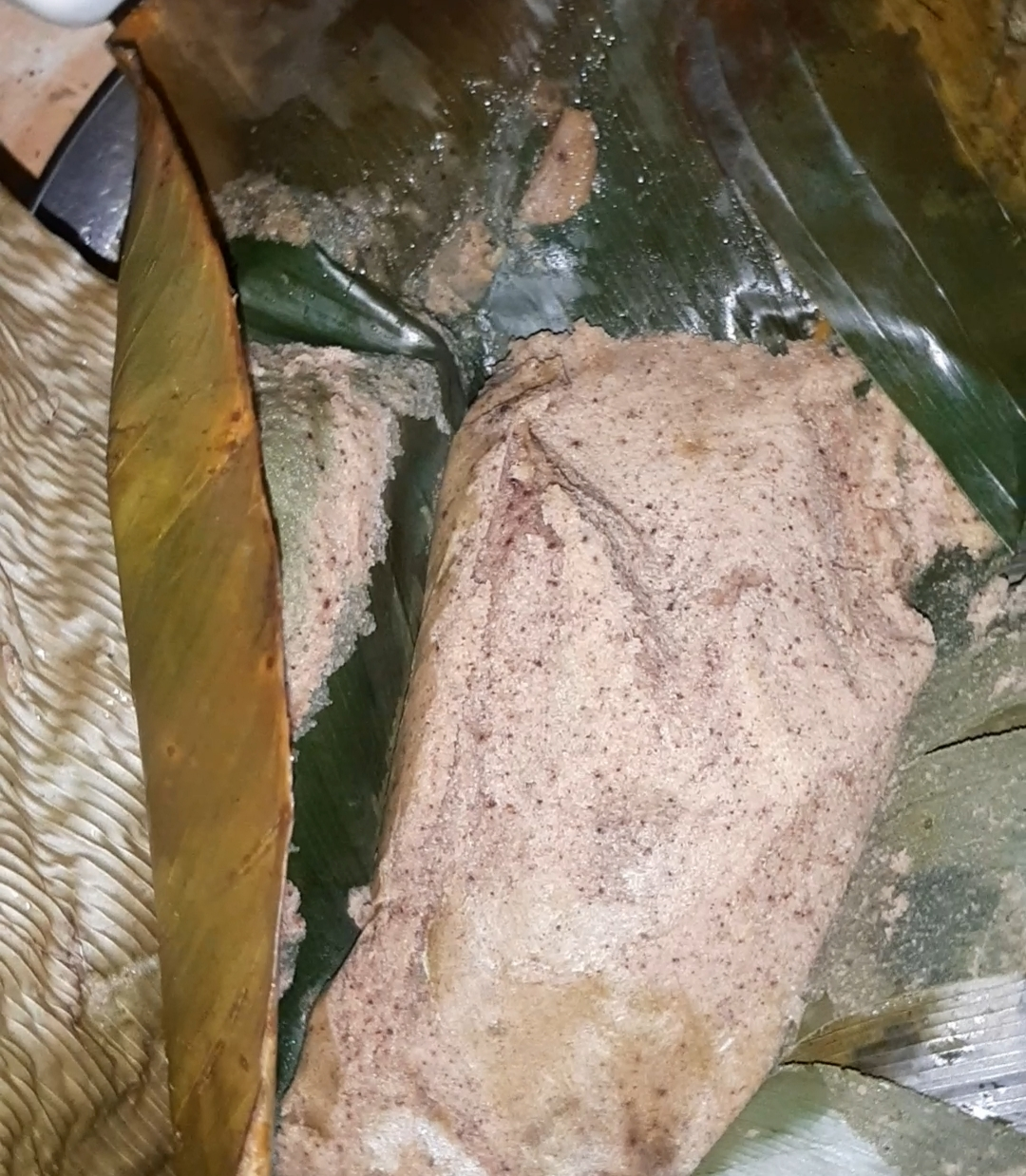
- Tubaani wrapped in Thaumatococcus daniellii
- Place of origin: Ghana
- Created by: Northern Region (Ghana)
- Serving temperature: Hot
- Main ingredients: black-eyed peas (beans)

Tubaani, also referred to as steamed black-eyed peas' pudding, is a popular Ghanaian dish that is commonly eaten in the northern regions and Zongo communities of Ghana. The dish consists of a paste made from the flour of black-eyed peas and water which is then cooked after being first wrapped in the sweet-tasting, aromatic leaves of the Marantaceous herb Thaumatococcus daniellii and served with gravy or pepper and sliced onions tossed in hot vegetable oil.

== Nutrients ==
It contains proteins, iron, vitamin B9, and soluble fibre as it is made from beans.

== See also ==
- Moin moin, a similar Nigerian dish
