= Koose =

West African beans dish

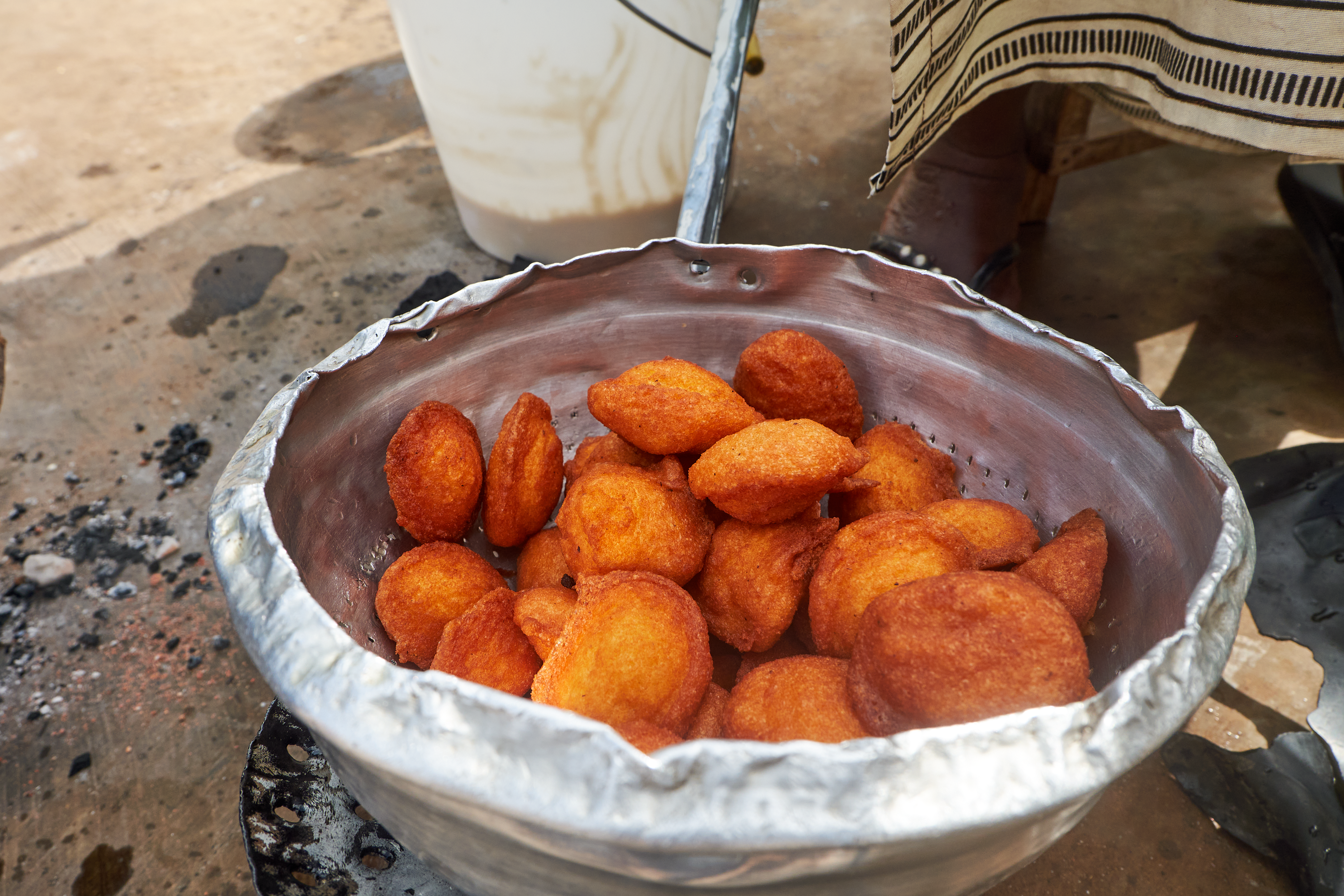
- Freshly fried koose
- Course: Snack
- Similar dishes: Akara

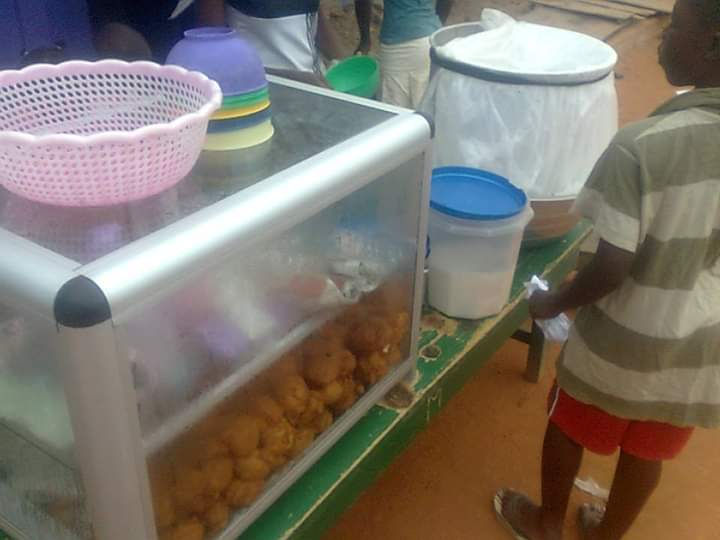
Koose

Koose (Dagbani: [ˈKooshe]) also known as Bean Cake is a spicy black-eyed pea fritter that is commonly eaten in West Africa as a snack. It is often taken with porridge. Sometimes it is sandwiched in bread, and called "Koose Bread" or "Paanu Kooshe". The food is said to have spread from the Yorubas of present day Nigeria who call it akara.

== Distribution ==
Koose is common in West Africa among the Hausa people of Northern Nigeria, the Dagomba and Hausa people of Ghana, and other parts of West Africa, including Sierra Leone and Cameroon. Koose can also be found in Caribbean countries such as Cuba and in South American countries such as Brazil.

== Names ==
It is known in Ghana as "koose", "kooshe" or "koosay". In Nigeria, it is known as "akara", in Brazil as "acaraje" and in Cuba as "bollitos de carita". To the Dagbamba of Ghana it is known as "Kooshe", the Ewe call it "agawu", and to some in the Zongo community as "koose tankuwa".

== Nutrition ==
Koose contains fiber, antioxidants, and protein from the black-eyed peas.
