= The Chop Bar =

Restaurant in Ghana

The Chop Bar is a Ghanaian food centre that serves local cuisines in a contemporary dining setting. It was founded by Elias Hage and Mona Quartey El Halabi in 2015

== Service ==
It currently has two branches, located at the Achimota Retail Centre and A&C Mall in Accra. Dishes serve are similar to that of local Chop Bar, but dishes are served in a contemporary environment. The eatery in partnership with digital online food shops like "Jumia Food" and "Eziban Food" provides digital service.

=== Menu ===
The Chop Bar serves mainly local dishes.

- Waakye with Fish and Wele / beef and Egg
- Vegetable Rice with beef and sausage / chicken and sausage
- Assorted Jollof Rice with beef and sausage / chicken and sausage
- Jollof Rice with Fried fish / Grilled Chicken
- Fried Rice with Fried fish / Grilled Chicken
- Red Red with fish/ beef/chicken and fried/boiled plantain
- Banku with Tilapia and red pepper / Okro Stew / Groundnut Soup / Light Soup / Palm-nut Soup
- Boiled Yam with Kontomire stew / Garden eggs stew / Goat Stew
- Boiled Plantain with Kontomire stew / Garden eggs stew / Goat stew
- Steamed rice with Kontomire stew / Garden eggs stew / Goat stew
- Fufu with Groundnut Soup / Light Soup / Palmnut Soup / Ebunuebunu / Abekati / Katikonto / Abekatikonto
- Omotuo with Groundnut Soup / Palm-nut Soup

== See also ==
- Ghanaian cuisine
- Chop bar
