= West African cuisine =

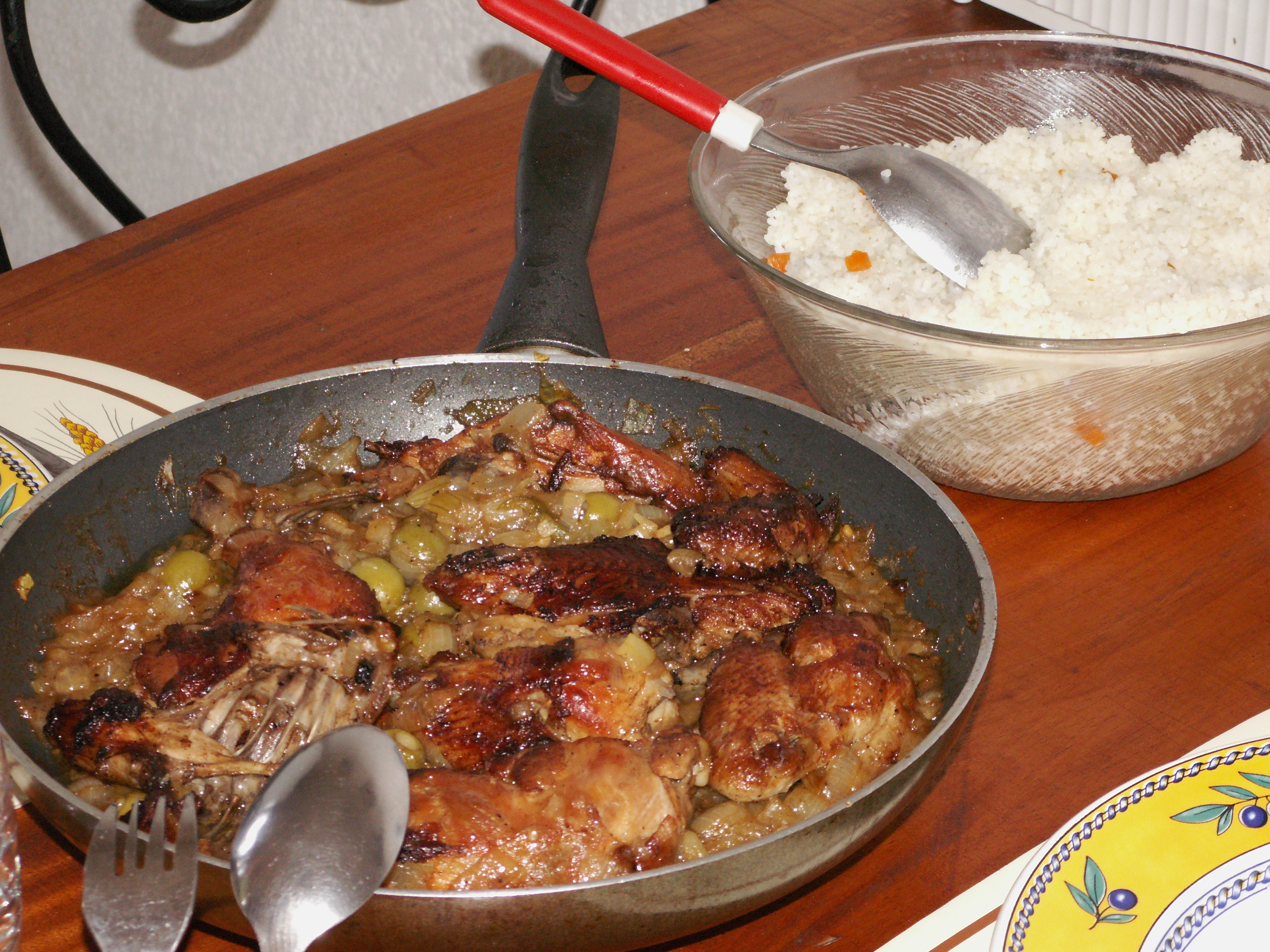
Senegalese yassa poulet, a tangy-spicy dish enjoyed throughout the West African region, made with Dijon mustard, onions, lemon juice, olives and Scotch bonnet peppers

West African cuisine encompasses a diverse range of foods that are split between its 16 countries. In West Africa, people buy groceries from markets, shops, stalls or supermarkets to make their meals. There are some families especially in rural places, that grow and raise their own food, in addition. Indigenous foods consist of a number of plant species and animals, and are important to in African cuisine. West African cuisine comes from crops with ancient origins to West Africa, as well as crops introduced from other continents due to trade. Animal produce largely include farm animals, fishing, and some animals hunted by those who still practice the skill.

The history of West Africa also plays a large role in their cuisine and recipes, as interactions with different cultures (particularly the Arab world and later Europeans) over the centuries have introduced many ingredients that went on to become key components of the various national cuisines today.

== History ==
West African cuisine has roots in ancient history. Yams, native West African rice, millet, sorghum, black-eyed peas, and okra were some common staples. Native spices used included grains of paradise, grains of Selim, alligator pepper, and calabash nutmeg. Some of these were traded to Europeans who sort these items. During the early modern period, European explorers and slave traders influenced regional cuisines in West Africa, but only to a limited extent. European merchant and slave ships brought chili peppers, maize and tomatoes from the New World, which have become ubiquitous components of West African cuisines, along with peanuts and cassava. In turn, these slave ships carried West African ingredients to the New World, including black-eyed peas, West African rice, roselle, ackee, garden egg, palm oil and okra.

Around the time of the colonial period, particularly during the Scramble for Africa, European settlers defined colonial borders without regard to pre-existing borders, territories or cultural differences. This bisected ethnicities and created colonies with varying culinary styles. As a result, it is difficult to sharply define, for example, Senegalese cuisine.

Although the European colonists brought many new ingredients to the African continent, they had relatively little effect on the ways people cook or cooking methods in West Africa.

== Ingredients ==
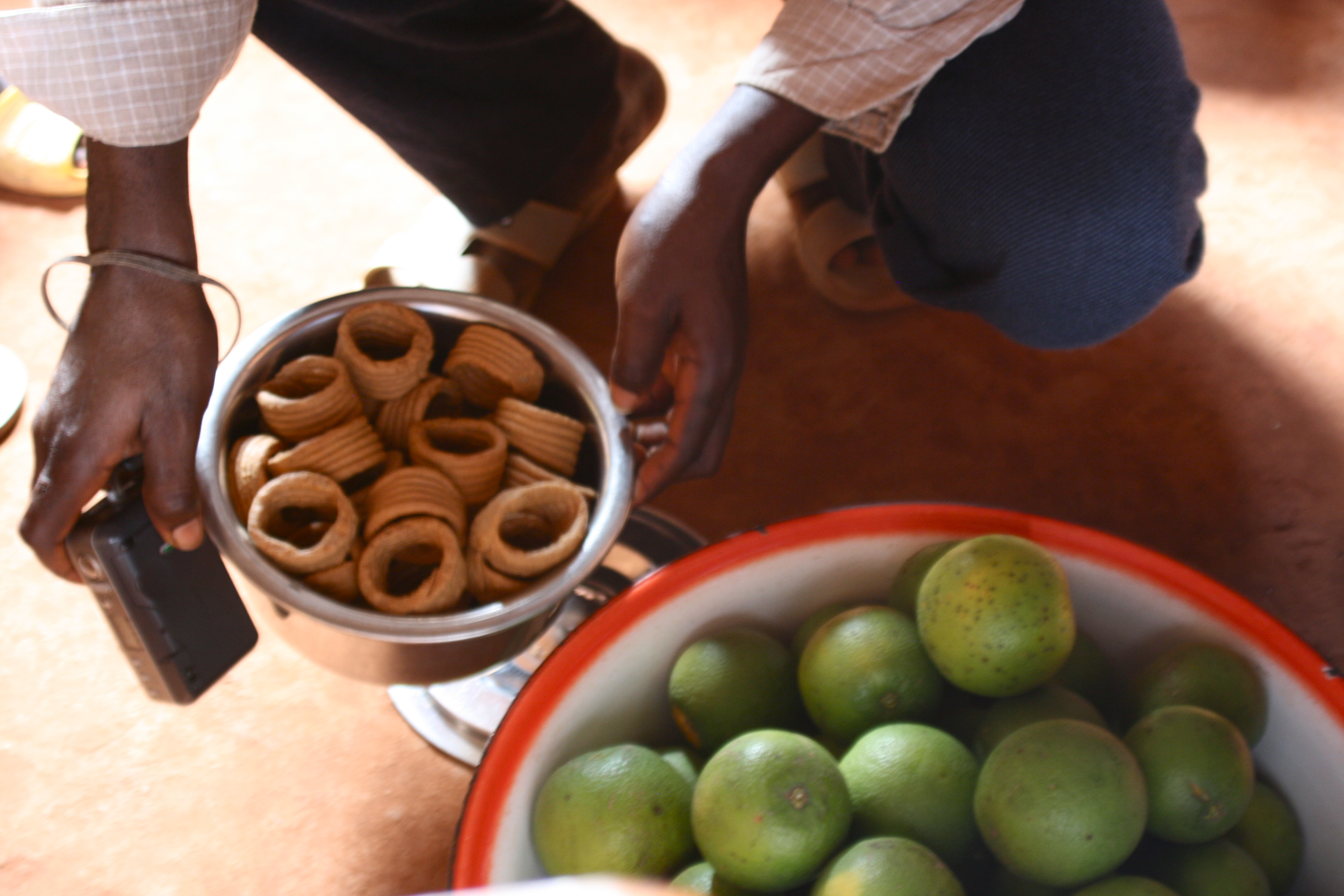
Klouikloui, rings of fried peanut butter as served in Benin

Though there are obvious differences among the local cuisines in West Africa, there are also many commonalities, mainly in the ingredients used.

Many dishes are enriched with a base of tomatoes, onions and chili peppers. Considered an essential and even "sacred" cooking technique in the region, the combination of these three ingredients sauteed in oil is analogous to similar concepts such as the holy trinity of Cajun and Creole cooking in the United States, sofrito used in the Spanish-speaking world, soffritto in Italy, and the mirepoix of France.

The most prevalent cooking oil is palm nut oil, traditionally associated with the coastal regions and contributing a distinctive colour, flavour and texture to food, while shea butter is more commonly used in the Sahel; called karité in French, which comes from the Arabic word ghartī, it is prized for the rich mouthfeel it imparts.

There are certain ingredients that go with certain countries as well. In Ghana, the most commonly used ingredients are hot pepper, ginger, and maize. Ghanaians use hot pepper because they believe the hot peppers will cool the body and cleanse/purify it (Salm, 106-108). In Senegal, the main ingredients are among many others hot pepper, rice, millet, peanut, ginger, tamarind leaves, and baobab fruit, and cooking oil (Ross, 75). Those are the few that have a slight difference of what they commonly use for their dishes.

For an overall view of West Africa, according to Fran Osseo-Asare, the common ingredients for the West African region are the leaves from a baobab tree, cereal grains: sorghum, millet, and fonio, cola nuts, egusi seeds, guinea fowl, melegueta pepper, oil palm, okra, and rice. Other ingredients used are okra (thickener) as a basis for soups and stews, black-eyed peas, and sesame according to Jessica B. Harris in High on the Hog.

=== Sauces ===
Obe ata and ata din din are base sauces used in many recipes. Both are based on tomatoes, chili peppers, onions and flavorings such as thyme, garlic, ginger, curry powder, along with stock or bouillon.

=== Seasonings ===
Chilli peppers, however, are widely used in West Africa, in fresh, dried and powdered form, particularly in the more hot and humid lands of the region. Introduced to Africa sometime after Christopher Columbus sailed to America by European sailors, it is said that the sweating induced by the spicy heat of chilli helps to cool the skin. More than in other regions of Africa, West Africans utilize Scotch bonnet chilli peppers with a liberal hand in many of their sauces and stews. The bite and fire of these extremely hot peppers (Scoville rating 200,000-300,000) add a unique flavor as well as heat. The chilli is also supposed to help preserve food, as well as adding flavour to relatively bland tropical staples like root vegetables.

The seeds of Guinea pepper (Aframomum melegueta; also called grains of paradise or melegueta pepper), a plant indigenous to West Africa, are also widely used. This native spice tastes and looks somewhat like a peppercorn, but has cardamom and coriander seed flavor notes. Grains of paradise was once a prized commodity reaching Europe through North African middlemen during the Middle Ages.

Sumbala or soumbala is a flavouring used widely across West Africa, used in a manner not unlike a bouillon cube. It is usually prepared by women over the course of several days, traditionally from néré (Parkia biglobosa) seeds, also known as locust bean, a plant native to West Africa. It can be made from other kinds of seeds, and the use of soybeans for this purpose is increasing due mainly to inadequate supply of néré seeds. The fabrication process involves boiling, cleaning and then packing away to ferment, with the fermentation process giving it a pungent smell and at the same time a rich, deep umami or savory flavour. Salt can be added to the finished product to facilitate storage life. This condiment is traditionally sold in balls or patties that can be kept for several months at a time in the case of the best quality.

It is a traditional cooking ingredient used across West Africa, although the less traditional bouillon cube, specifically the Maggi brand, rivals it in popularity.

African potash (potassium carbonate) is a native salt used for flavoring and to expedite the cooking time for some foods. It is made from wood-fire ashes in an ancient process that was once used by pioneer settlers in North America.

=== Vegetables ===
Vegetables are a part of any West African meal. Some commonly eaten vegetables include black-eyed peas, eggplant, pumpkin and other squashes, okra, as well as an extensive variety of both farmed and foraged green leafy vegetables, little known or used outside of the African continent.

Baobab leaves, pumpkin leaves, rosella leaves, sweet potato leaves, and cassava leaves (which contain cyanide in their raw state, and are always blanched with boiling water before use to remove the toxins) are some of the greens that are commonplace in a West African kitchen. Black-eyed peas form the basis for a popular fried snack, the akara fritter.

Starchy tubers and root vegetables are used as staple food, to be served with their meat and vegetable dishes, often as a foil to the hotness of the peppers. Cassava, cocoyams, sweet potatoes, plantains, and yams are ubiquitous in the local diet, and they are usually boiled and then pounded with a pestle and mortar into a thick starchy paste called fufu.

Other starch staples eaten throughout West Africa besides root vegetables and tubers include fonio, rice, millet, sorghum, and maize.

=== Meat ===
West Africans diet features several meat types, red meat, white meat and seafood. Seafood is especially popular along the coast and many dishes combine both fish and meat. Seafood is one of the most common protein sources in West Africa.

Seafood is so prevalent in this region that this industry accounts for a quarter of the workforce. Dried and smoked fish flavor a number of sauces, stews, and other dishes, including condiments, in much the same way that anchovies and bacon flavor food in a number of other cuisines. It is often flaked and fried in oil, and sometimes cooked in sauce made with the base of hot peppers, onions and tomatoes, various spices (such as soumbala) and water to produce a combination of subtle flavors.

Chicken is eaten nearly everywhere and chicken eggs are a common food and source of protein. Guinea fowl eggs also popular. In some inland areas, beef, pork and mutton are preferred, with goat meat being the dominant red meat.

Suya, a popular grilled spicy meat kebab flavored with peanuts and other spices, is sold by street vendors as a snack or evening meal and is typically made with beef or chicken.

== Representative dishes ==
Some dishes are a prevalent feature in most West African societies, but bear different names in different locales.

=== Fufu ===
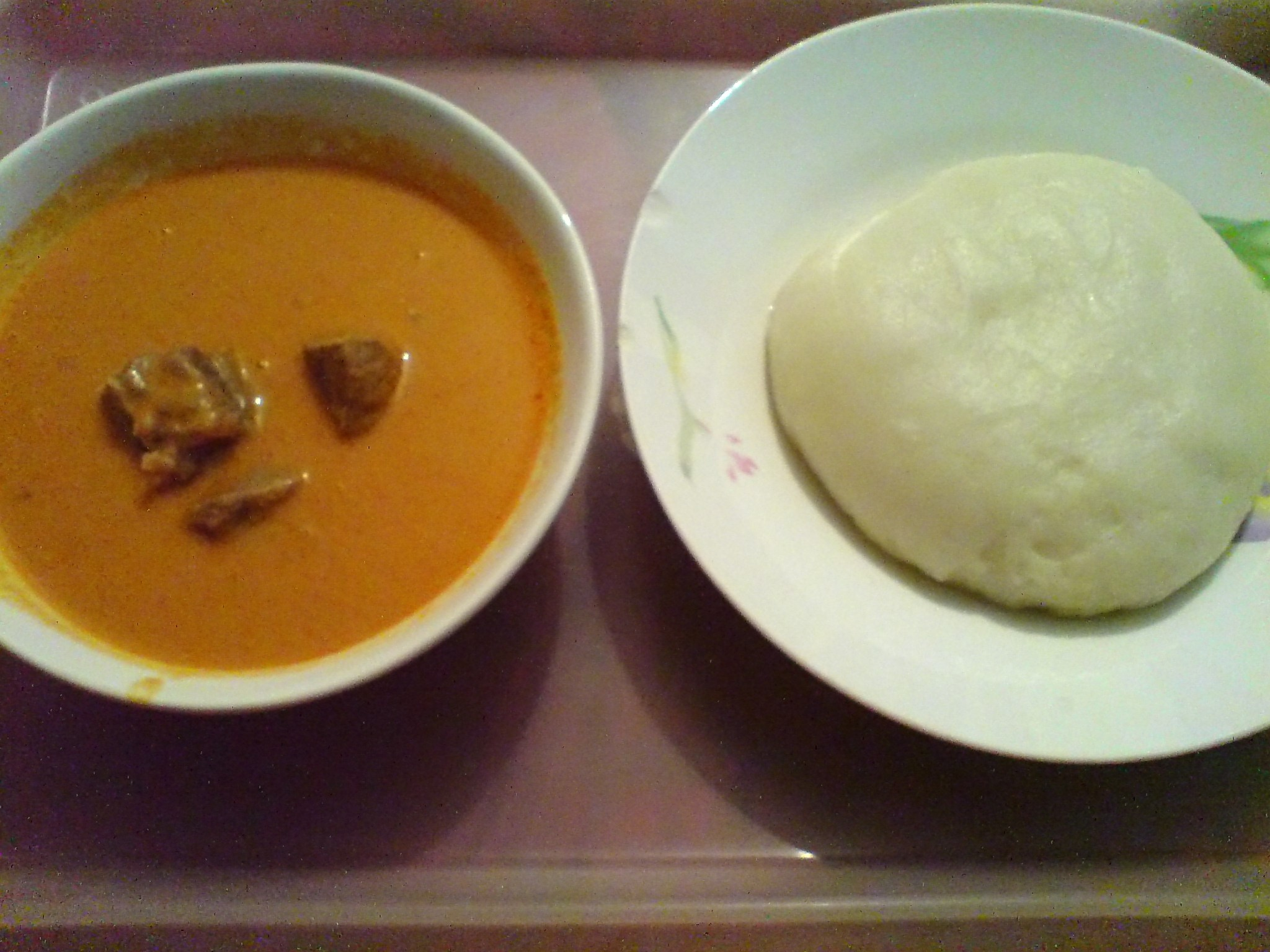
A plate of fufu accompanied with peanut soup

Fufu is usually made from cassava, yams, and sometimes combined with cocoyam, plantains, cornmeal, or oatmeal. Fufu is under the food category of okele or swallow. In Ghana, fufu is mostly made from boiled cassava and unripe plantain beaten together, as well as from cocoyam. Currently, these products have been made into powder or flour and can be mixed with hot water to obtain the final product, eliminating the task of beating it in a mortar with a pestle until a desired consistency is reached.

Fufu can also be made from semolina, rice, or even instant potato flakes. Often, the dish is still made by traditional methods: pounding and the base substance in a mortar with a wooden spoon. In contexts, a food processor may also be used.

In Western and Central Africa, the more common method is to serve a mound of fufu along with a soup (ọbẹ). After washing hands, the diner pinches off a small ball of fufu and makes an indentation with the thumb. This reservoir is then filled with soup, and the ball is eaten.

In Nigeria and Ghana, the ball is often not chewed but swallowed whole; in fact, chewing fufu is considered a faux pas. Therefore, fufu not only serves as a food but also as a utensil.

Some soups that may be served with fufu or other Okele include light (tomato) soup, palm nut soup, groundnut soup, Eforiro, Egusi, peppersoup, and other types of soups with vegetables such as okra and nkontomire (cocoyam leaves). Soups are often made with different kinds of meat and fish, fresh or smoked.

=== Groundnut stew ===
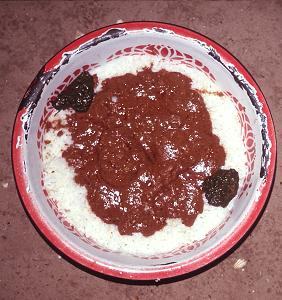
Maafe prepared by a Senegalese cook.

Groundnut stew (maafe; var. mafé, maffé, maff, sauce d'arachide, tigadèguèna or tigadene) is a peanut-based stew common to much of West Africa, and very popular in Senegal, the Gambia, Mali, Guinea and Côte d'Ivoire. Variants of maafe appear in the cuisine of nations throughout West Africa and Central Africa. With the significant expansion of groundnut cultivation during the colonial period, maafe has become a popular dish across West Africa, and as far east as Cameroon.

Recipes for the stew vary widely, but groundnut stew at its core is cooked with a sauce based on groundnuts (peanuts), the West African trinity of tomatoes, onion and chillies, and protein components such as mutton, beef or chicken. In the coastal regions of Senegal, maafe is frequently made with fish. Maafe is traditionally served with white rice (in Senegambia), couscous (as West Africa meets the Sahara) or fufu and sweet potatoes in the more tropical areas.

=== Jollof rice ===
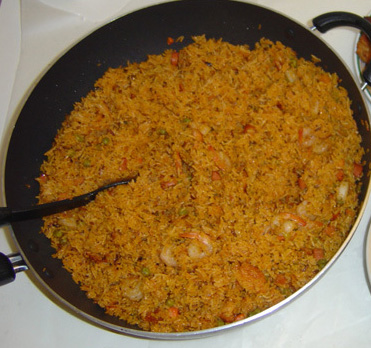
Jollof rice

Jollof rice, also called benachin, is a popular dish all over West Africa. It originated in Senegal but has since spread to the whole of West Africa, especially Nigeria and Ghana amongst members of the Wolof ethnic group, from whom the word "jollof" originated.

There are many variations of jollof rice, which in most cuisines depends on a base similar to obe ata. The most common basic ingredients are rice, tomatoes and tomato paste, onion, salt, and red pepper. Beyond that, nearly any kind of meat, vegetable, or spice can be added.

The Senegalese version of jollof rice is a bit different and is called ceebu jen, the national dish of Senegal. A variation, thiebou yapp, or "rice meat" is made with beef, mutton or other red meat. Riz gras is a similar dish found in French-speaking West Africa.

== List of other West African dishes ==
- Abacha
- Akara
- Aloko
- Boli
- Cachupa
- Chin chin
- Couscous
- Dambou
- Draw soup
- Ẹbà
- Egusi soup
- Ewedu
- Frejon
- Fried plantain, dodo or alloco—a popular version made in Ghana is called kelewele, or hot plantain chips.
- Futari
- Garri (ground cassava)
- Jollof rice
- Fakou
- Fried fish
- Fufu
- Kedjenou
- Kenkey
- Koko
- Kokoro
- Meat pie
- Moin moin
- Ndolé
- Ngome
- Ogbono soup
- Ogi
- Palaver sauce
- Peanut soup
- Pounded yam
- Puff-puff
- Sauce aux feuilles de patates douces
- Suya
- Palm nut soup
- Red red
- Tapalapa bread
- Wagasi
- Yassa au poulet

== Beverages ==
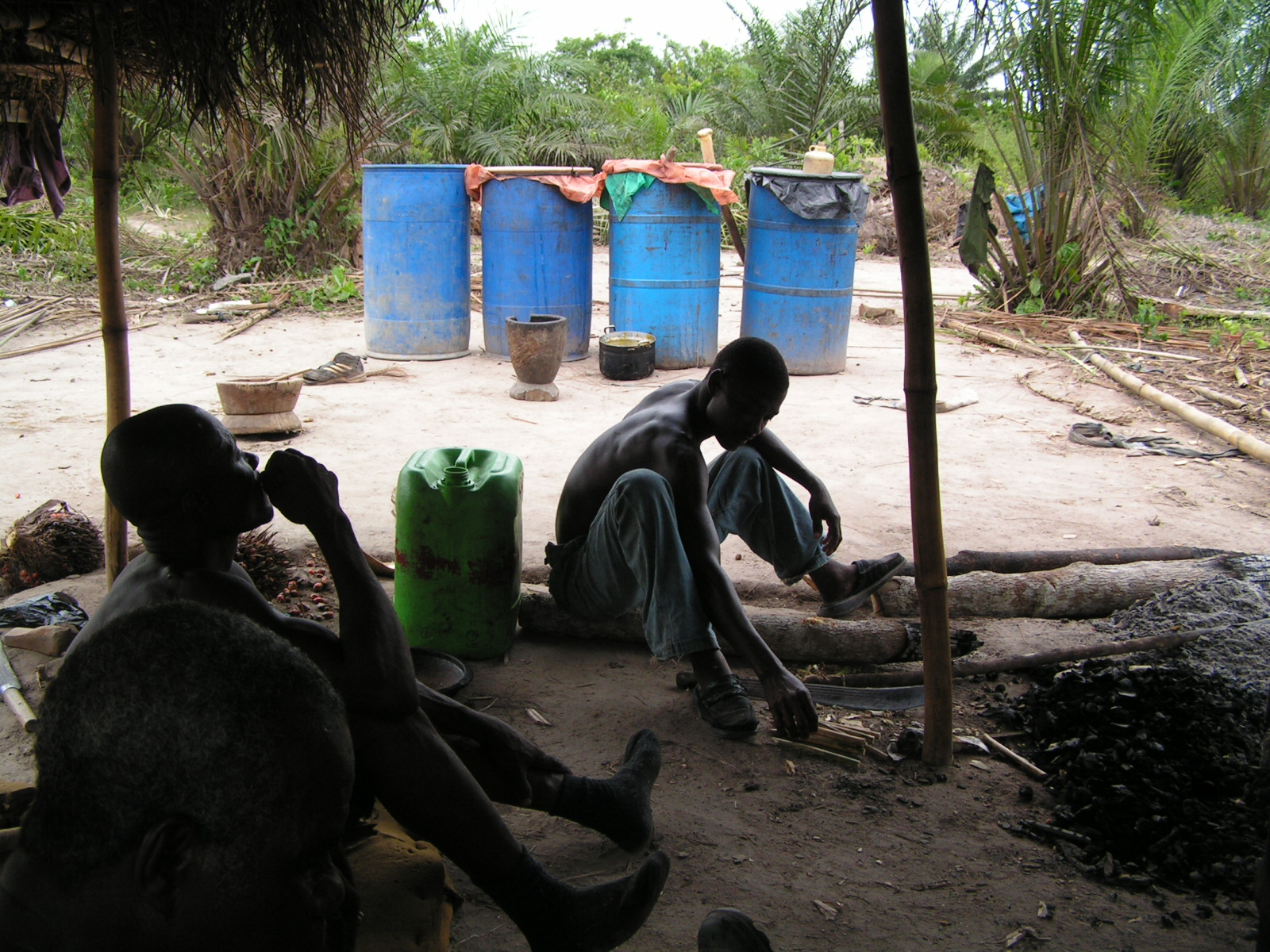
Local distillation of palm wine in Ghana

Malt drinks such as Supermalt and fresh coconut water are popular beverages in West Africa. As for alcoholic drinks, palm wine is a common beverage made from the fermented sap of various types of palm trees and is usually sold in sweet (less-fermented, retaining more of the sap's sugar) or sour (fermented longer, making it stronger and less sweet) varieties. Beer from millet is also common. Drinks made from roselle like Zobo are popular. Tea is popular.

== Etiquette ==
Dining is communal; diners use their fingers to eat. Water has a very strong ritual significance in many West African nations (particularly in dry areas), and water is often the first thing an African host will offer a guest.

== By country ==
For more specific styles, refer to the articles on each national or regional cuisine:

- Benin cuisine
- Cuisine of Burkina Faso
- Cape Verdean cuisine
- Gambian cuisine
- Ghanaian cuisine
- Cuisine of Guinea
- Guinea-Bissauan cuisine
- Ivorian cuisine (cuisine of Côte d'Ivoire)
- Liberian cuisine
- Malian cuisine
- Mauritanian cuisine
- Cuisine of Niger
- Nigerian cuisine
- Cuisine of Saint Helena
- Senegalese cuisine
- Cuisine of Sierra Leone
- Togolese cuisine

== See also ==
- Caribbean cuisine
- List of African cuisines
- List of African dishes
- Soul food
- Yoruba cuisine
- Igbo cuisine
