= Koobi =

Salted fish

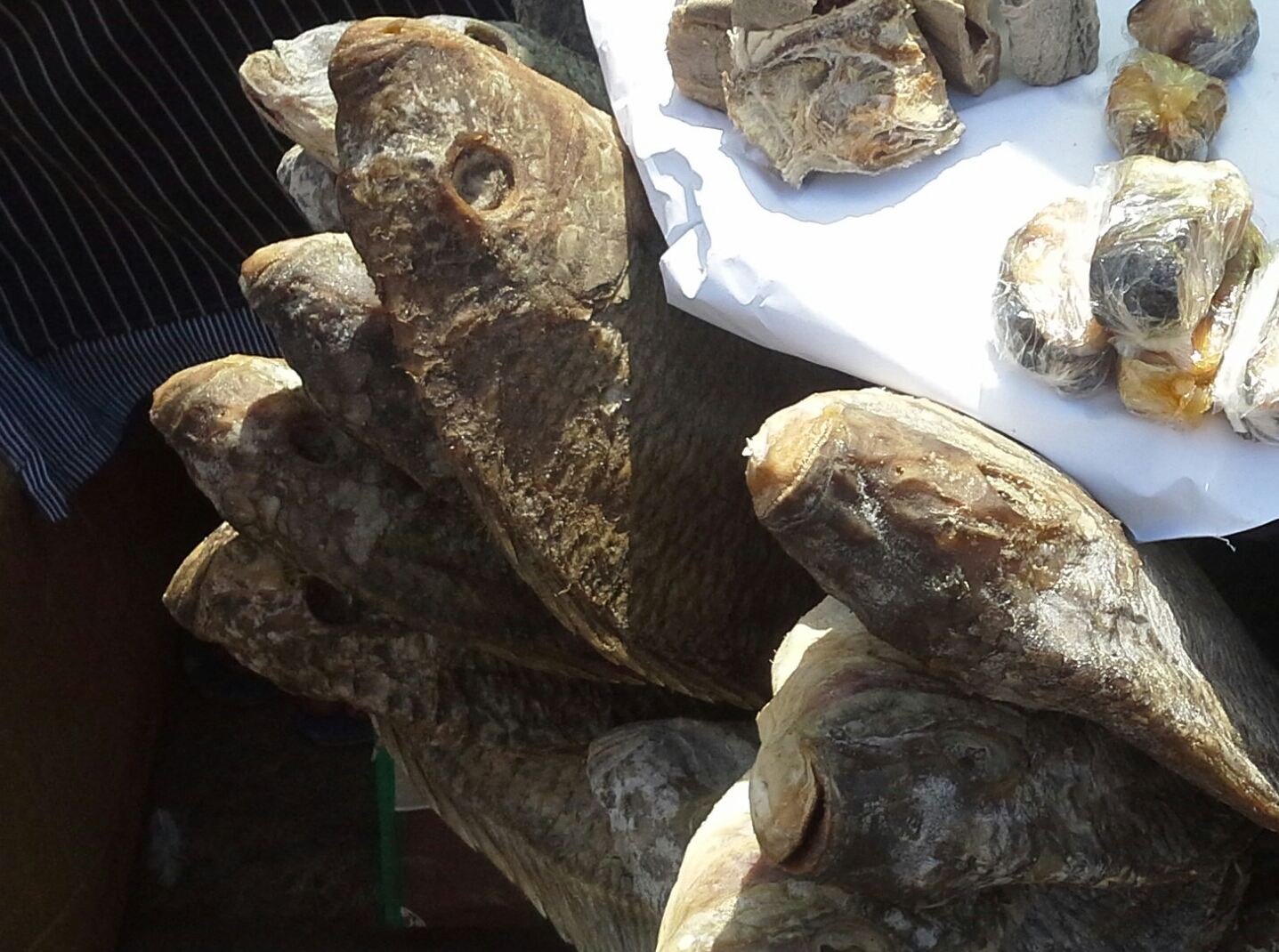
Koobi

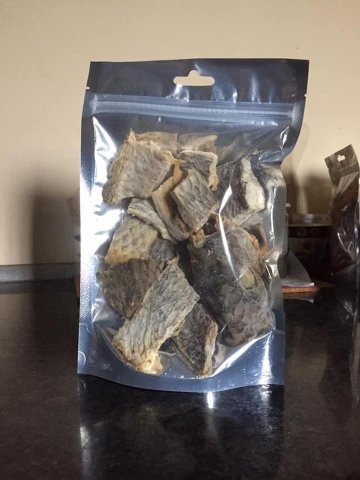
Wrapped koobi

Koobi is the Akan name for salted, dried tilapia originating from Ghana. The fish adds a distinctive flavor to Ghanaian delicacies, such as garden egg stew, okra stew, kontomire stew and other local Ghanaian cuisines.

== Preparation ==
Koobi is processed by placing the fresh tilapia in a basin with salt in the fish chest. Use the salt to cover the fish for 3 days. After the 3 days, remove it and dry it in the sun for 5 days or until all the water is drained.

== See also ==
- Ghanaian cuisine
- Ghanaian people
- Chop bar – a traditional eatery in Ghana, mostly located in Southern Ghana
- West African cuisine
- List of African cuisines
