= Sierra Leonean cuisine =

Culinary traditions of Sierra Leone

Sierra Leonean cuisine consists of the cooking traditions and practices from Sierra Leone. It follows the traditions of other West African cuisines. The country has 16 ethnic groups.

== Overview ==
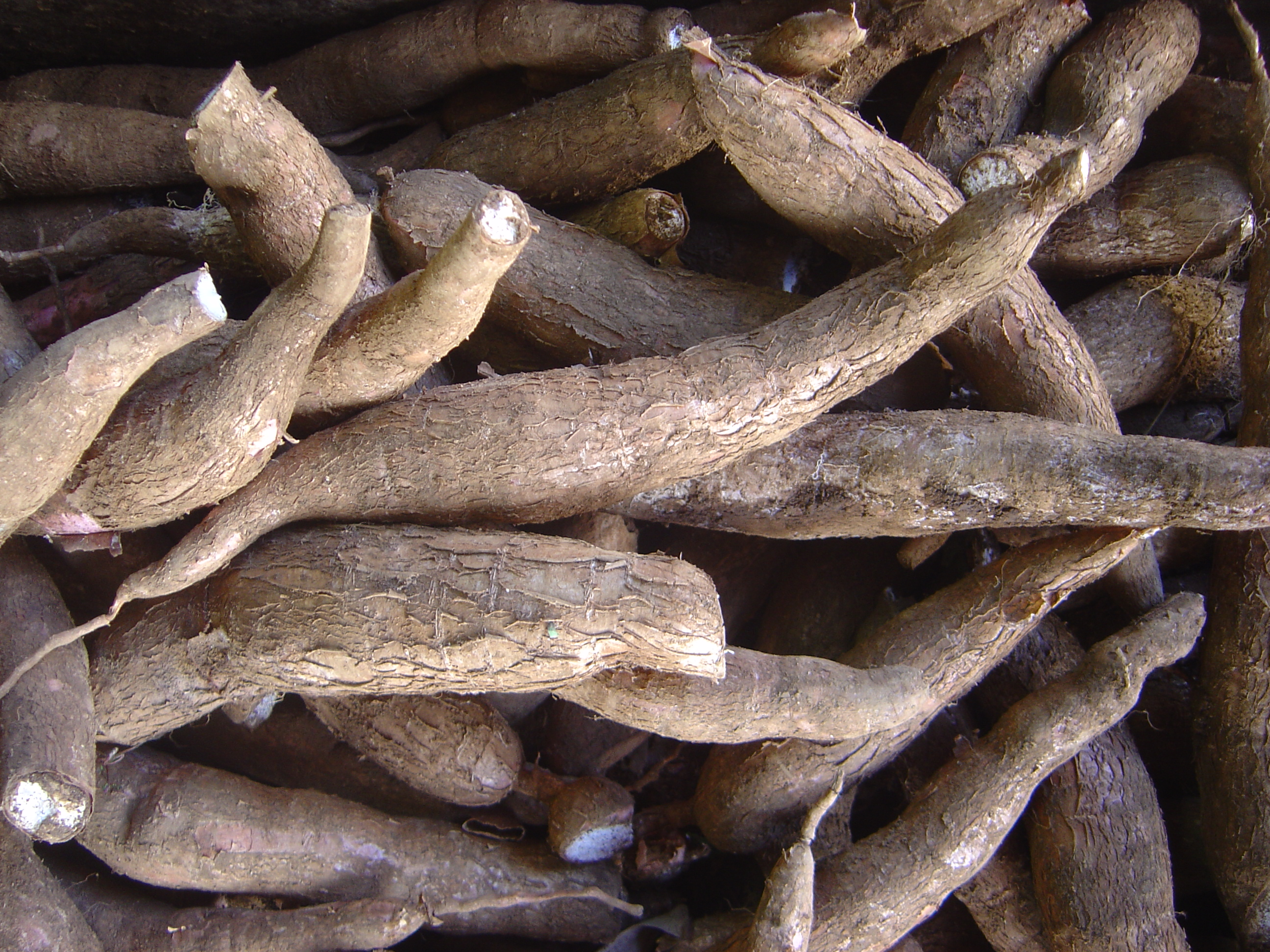
Unprocessed cassava root

The most commonly eaten food in Sierra Leone is rice, which is typically served as part of every meal eaten, and is considered so ubiquitous that many Sierra Leoneans consider that a meal is not complete without it. Another popular staple food is cassava, which is pounded to make fufu; the leaves of the cassava are cooked into a green stew.

Palm oil and peanuts are also widely eaten, and while yams are found in Sierra Leone, they are not a mainstay of the diet as they are in other parts of West Africa. Other staples of the Sierra Leonean diet are bananas, cinnamon, coconut, ginger, okra, plantains and tamarind.

Commonly eaten meats include goat, chicken and beef, and there are also a number of dishes using pork as an added ingredient.

Oranges, bananas, papayas, lemons, avocados, guava, watermelons, mangoes, and pineapples are fruits commonly eaten by Sierra Leoneans.

Popular starches in the country's cuisine include:

- Acheke
- Garri
- Black-eyed peas, known in Sierra Leone Creole as binch

== Stews ==
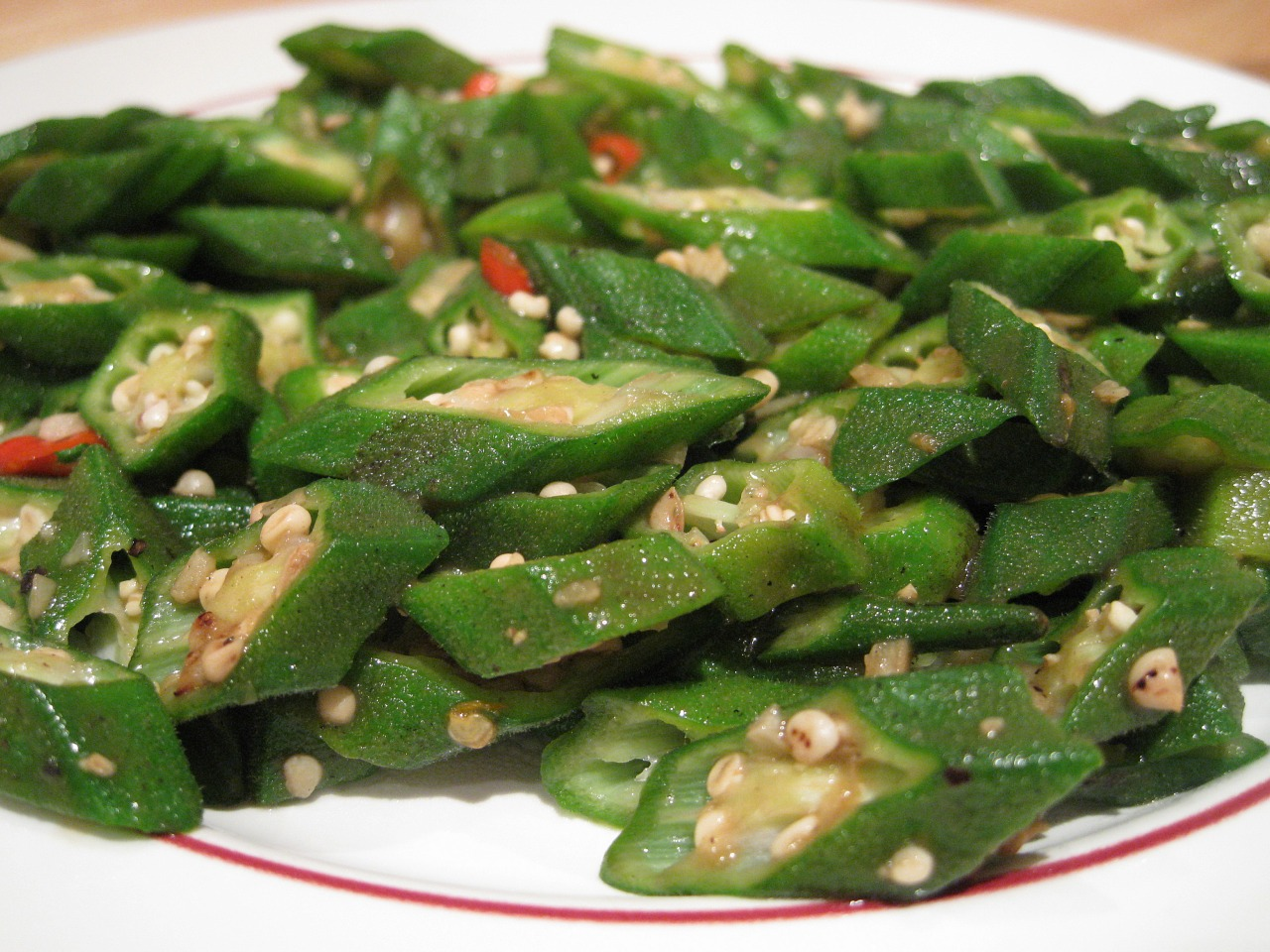
Stir-fried okra

Stews are a fundamental part of Sierra Leone's cuisine, with cassava leaves having been called the country's national dish. Stew is often served with jollof rice, white rice or snacks such as plantain, akara, yam or cassava. Groundnut stew, also called peanut stew or peanut soup, often has chicken and vegetables included. This is often served to families as a large meal.

=== Cassava leaves ===
Cassava leaves are an important cooking ingredient in Sierra Leone and considered the primary staple food. In preparation, the tenderest cassava leaves are washed, then either pounded very finely or bruised with a pestle and mortar, and then finely shredded before cooking. The leaves are added to palaver sauce, which is made using red palm oil mixed with other ingredients, such as onions, pepper, fish, meat, and vegetables to create a stew. To give the dish a more exquisite taste, coconut oil may be used instead of palm oil.

== Beverages ==
Ginger beer is typically a homemade non-alcoholic beverage, made out of pure ginger, and sweetened with sugar to taste. Cloves and lime juice are sometimes added for flavor.

- Star Beer (Sierra Leone Brewery Limited)
- Poyo (palm wine)

== Sweets ==
- Foorah or furah, sweetened dumplings made of rice flour.

== See also ==
- African cuisine
- List of African cuisines
