= Gnamakoudji =

Traditional Ivorian drink

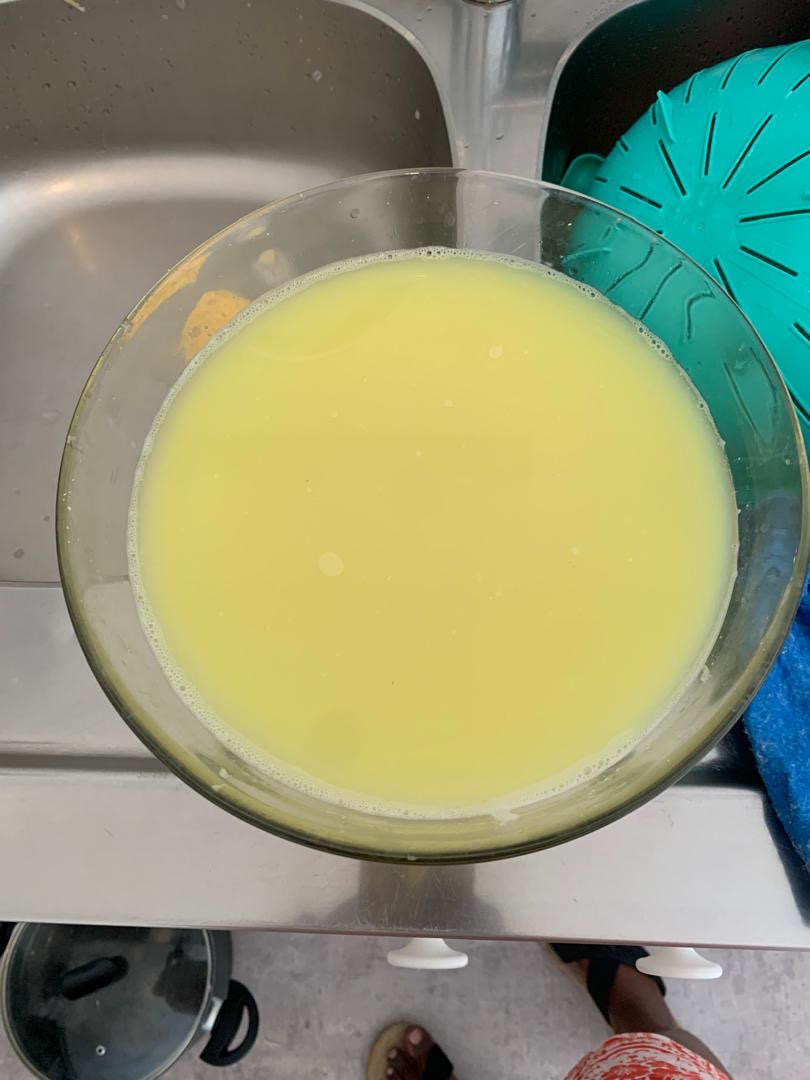
- Alternative names: Gnamakou
- Course: Drink
- Place of origin: Ivory Coast
- Associated cuisine: Ivorian cuisine
- Serving temperature: Cold
- Main ingredients: Ginger
- Ingredients generally used: Lemon, mint, pineapple juice, sugar, vanilla

Gnamakoudji, or gnamakou, is a beverage in West African cuisine. Its main ingredient is ginger juice strained through cheesecloth; it is often made with pineapple juice, sugar, vanilla, lemon, or mint. Originating in Ivory Coast, it is also frequently consumed in Benin, Burkina Faso, Mali, and Senegal. The beverage can be used as the base for cocktails and mocktails.

Gnamakoudji is used in folk medicine. It is similar to tangawisi, a Congolese drink.
