= Senegalese cuisine =

Culinary traditions of Senegal

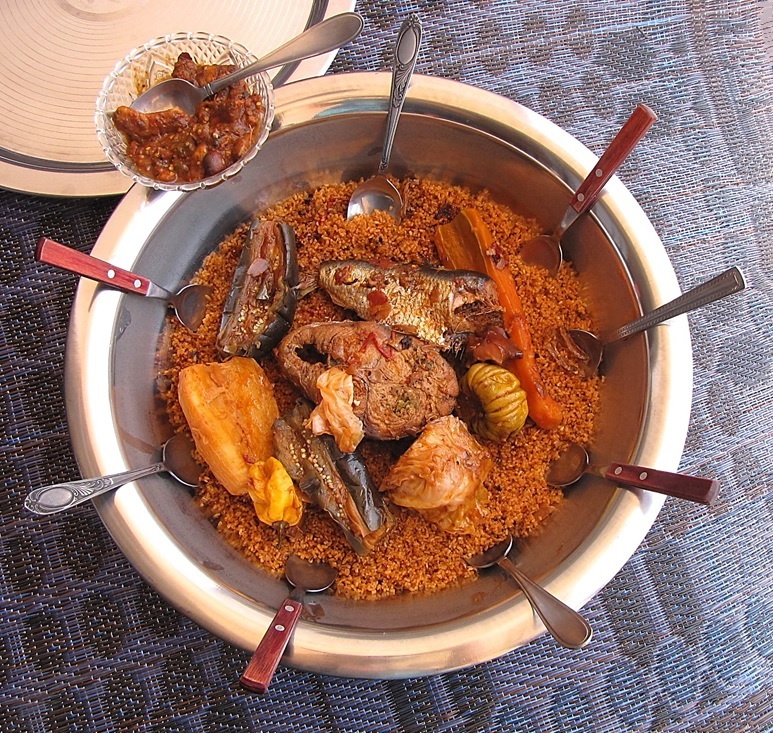
Thiéboudiène boukhonk with tamarind

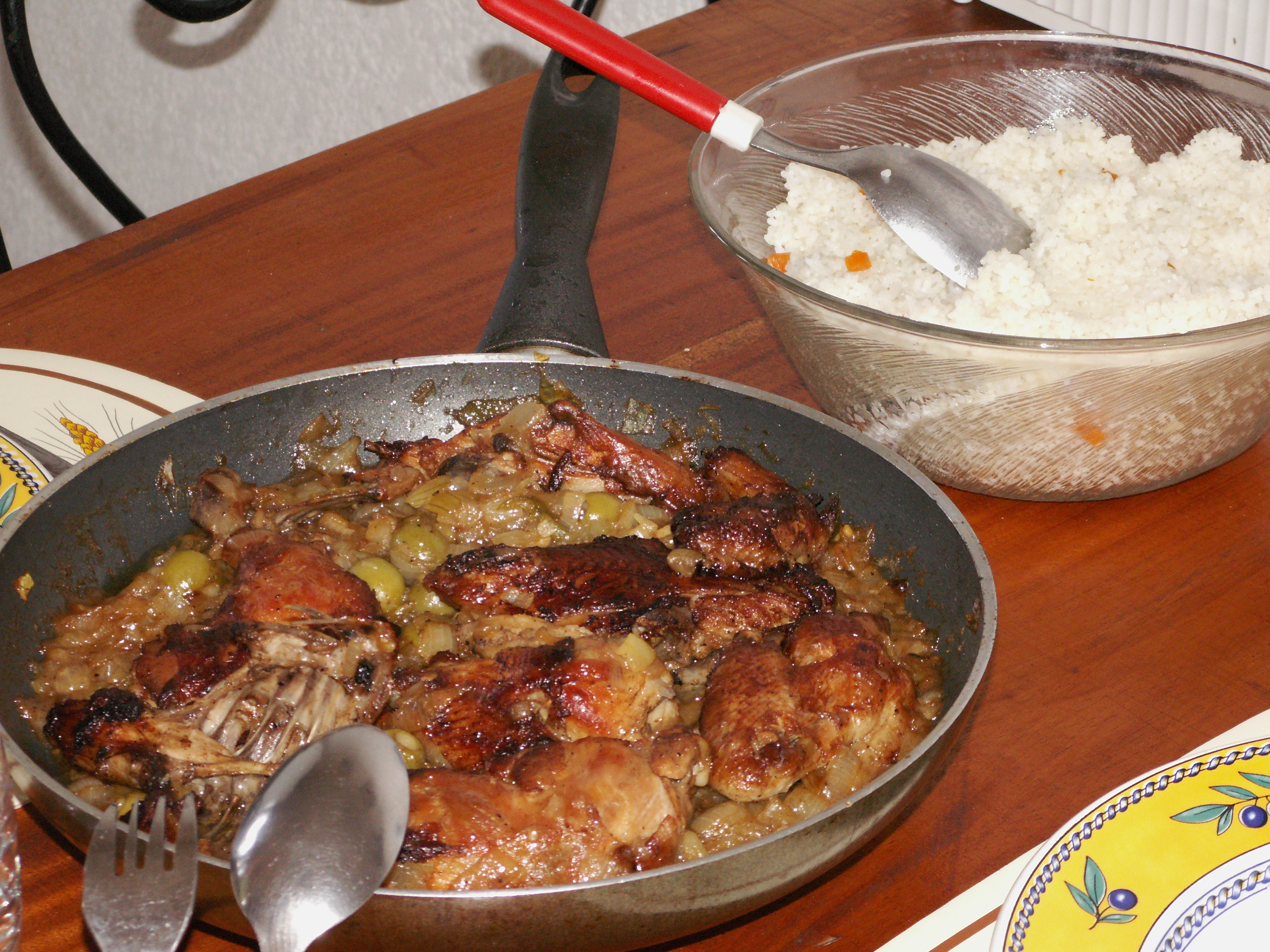
Poulet yassa

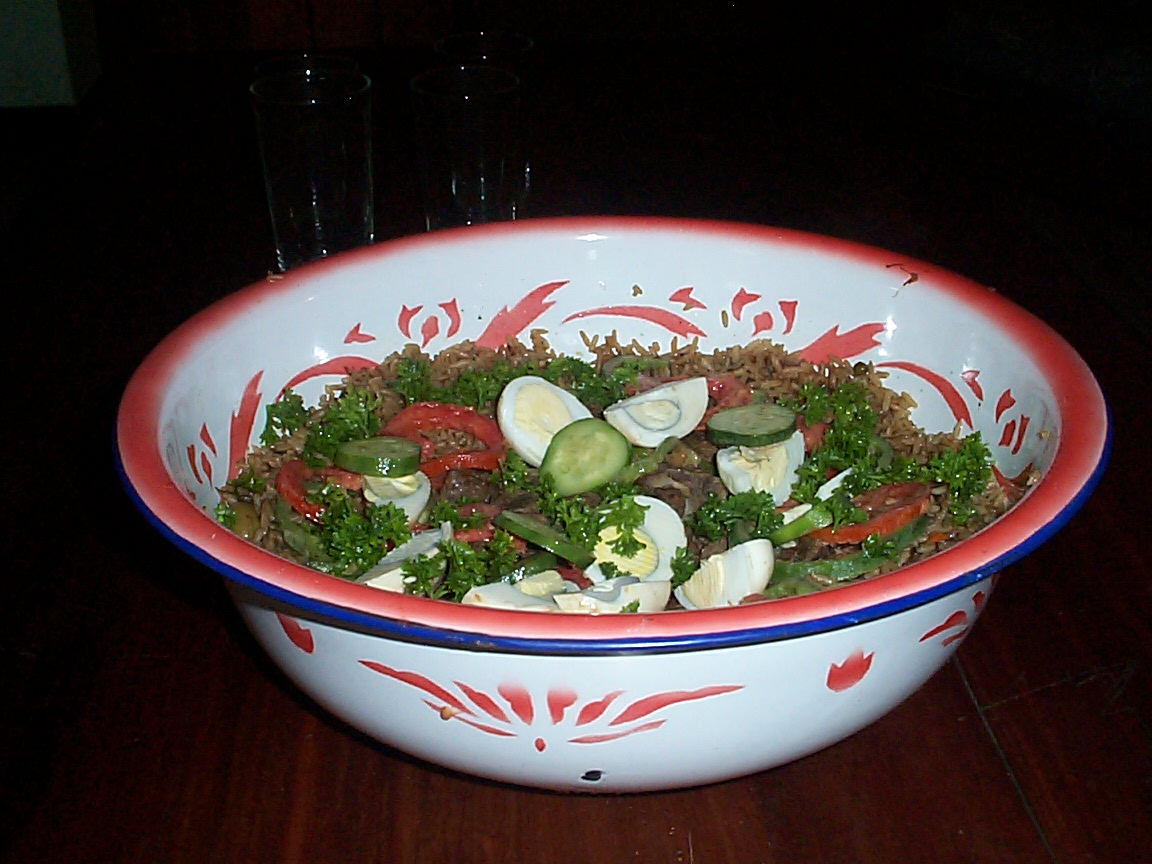
Chebu yapp, a beef version of thiéboudienne

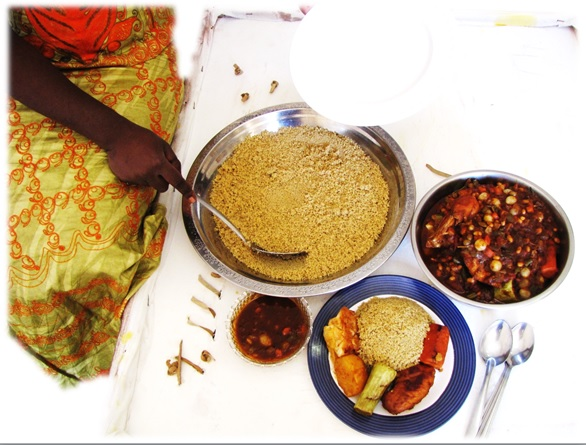
Couscous Senegalese thièré with chicken and sauce (thièré/chere—same word, spellings vary)

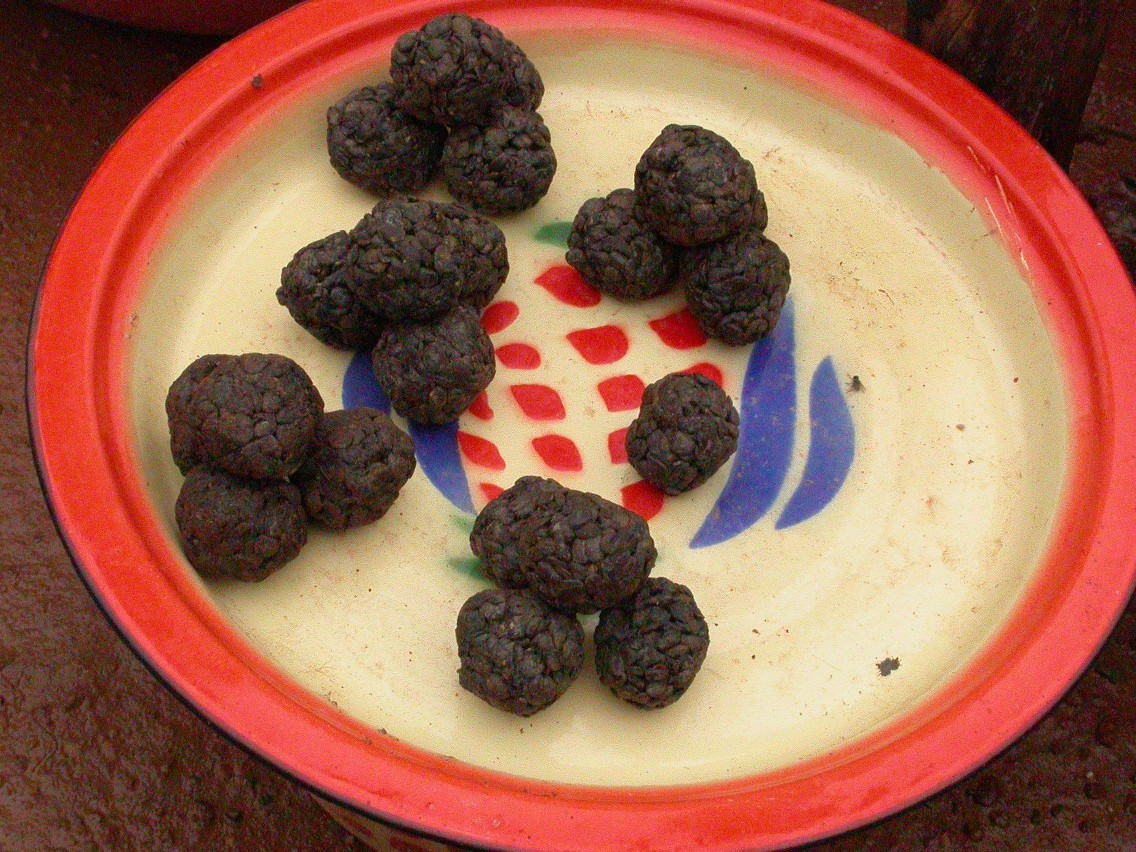
Soumbala or dawadawa—a fermented African locust bean (Parkia biglobosa) food condiment. It is used widely throughout West Africa—much like miso in East Asia, it is made from the boiled seed, which is then fermented. It is sold in small balls and sometimes also in powdered form.

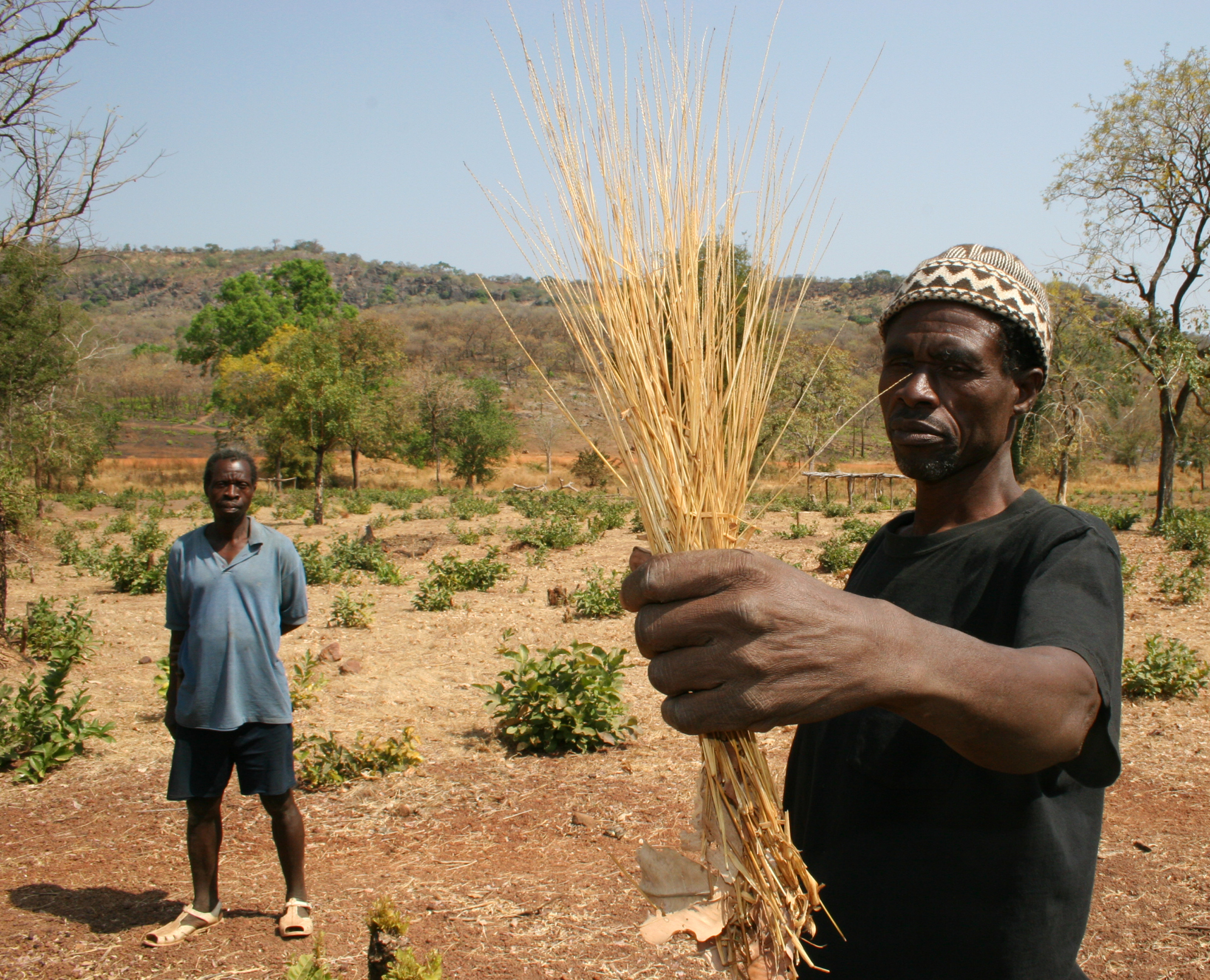
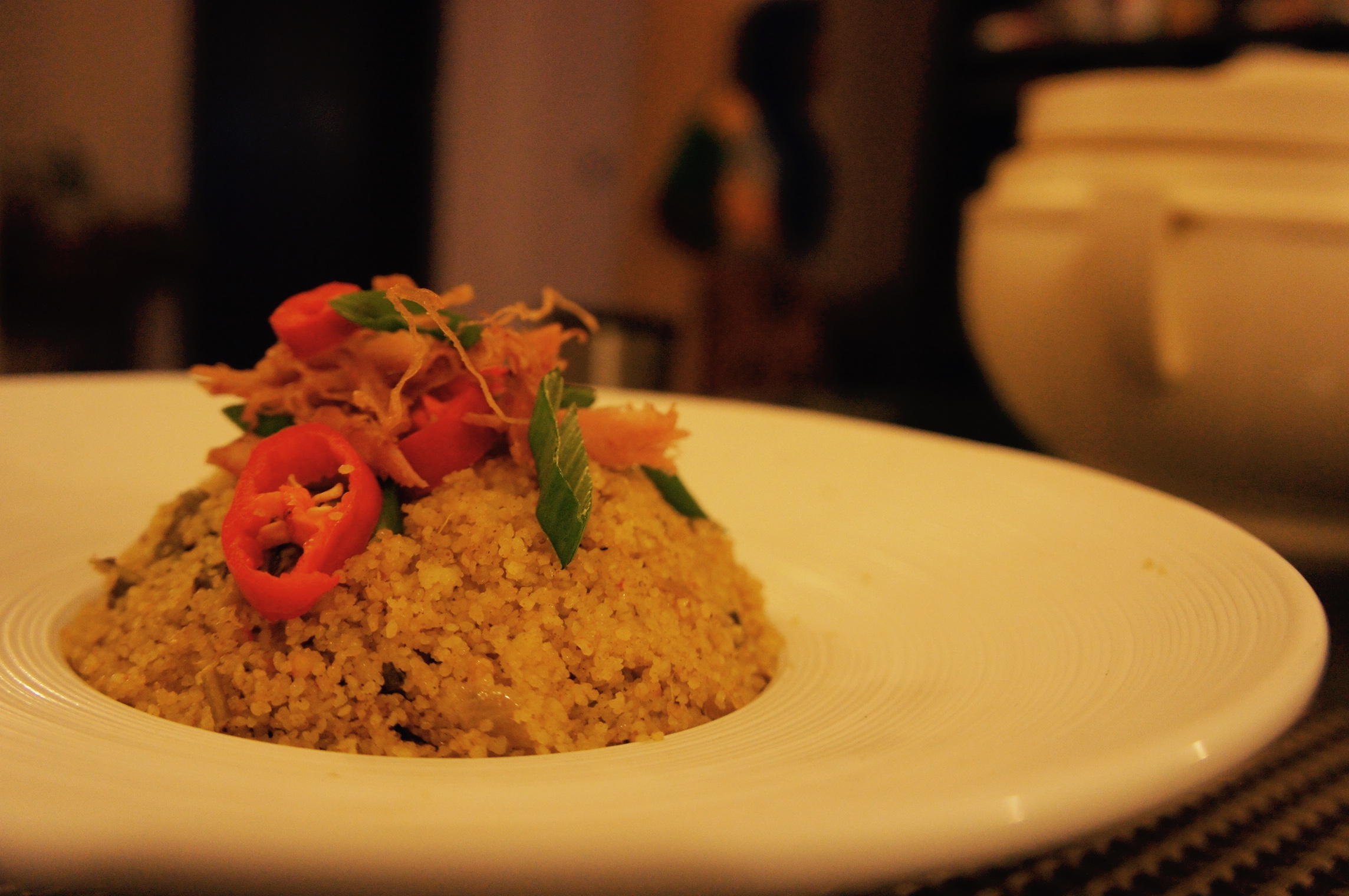
Ears of fonio (or acha). The ancient grain is protein-rich and grows well in arid conditions, and no pesticides are needed for its cultivation. In Senegal, where it is part of local customs and traditions, fonio is used in breakfast, lunch, and dinner dishes. The longtime neglected and underutilized crop made a renaissance with the invention of the fonio husking machine by Sanoussi Diakité. (left); Dambun Acha (right).

The cuisine of Senegal is a West African cuisine that derives from the nation's many ethnic groups, the largest being the Wolof, Fula, and Serer. The food you find in Senegal is the same food you would find in the countries surrounding it or in West Africa, sometimes, but often called by different names or made slightly differently.

Because Senegal borders the Atlantic Ocean, fish is very important in Senegalese cooking. Chicken, lamb, peas, eggs, and beef are also used, but pork is usually not due to the nation's largely Muslim population. Peanuts, Senegal's primary cash crop, as well as millet, white rice, sweet potatoes, cassava, black-eyed peas and various vegetables, are also incorporated into many recipes. Meats and vegetables are typically stewed or marinated in herbs and spices, and then poured over rice or millet couscous or eaten with bread.

Popular fresh juices are made from bissap, ginger, bouye (pronounced 'buoy', which is the fruit of the baobab tree, also known as "monkey bread fruit"), mango, or other fruit or wild trees (most famously soursop, which is called corossol in French).

Desserts are very rich and sweet, combining native ingredients with the extravagance and style characteristic of the French impact on Senegal's culinary methods. They are often served with fresh fruit and are traditionally followed by coffee or tea. Tea, known as attaya, is served in a ritualistic fashion.

== Breakfast ==
- Ndambé or ndambe—beans cooked in a spiced tomato paste, typically served on bread as a breakfast sandwich.
- Bread and café touba

== Lunch and dinner ==
- Thieboudienne or chebu jën (among other names)—"The Rice of Fish." Dubbed as the national dish of Senegal, it consists of flavoursome fish that has been marinated with parsley, lemon, garlic, onions (and other herbs), then later cooked with tomato paste and a variety of vegetables such as lettuce, cabbage, and carrots. Rice is later added to the mix giving it a reddish look.
- Thiébou yapp or chebu yap—"The Rice of Meat." It is very popular with the Senegalese and is usually cooked with beef (or lamb) that is first fried and garnished with onions, garlic, black pepper, red pepper, and salt (and other ingredients). Mustard and water are later added to the mix for the meat to tenderize and soak up all the flavours. As with chebu jën, rice is then added to the mix and tends to be garnished with either green olives or cooked black-eyed peas.
- Thiébou guinar or chebu ginaar—"The Rice of Chicken." The preparation and procedures are similar to that of chebu yap: the chicken is first fried with herbs and spices, and later soaked in water and mustard. When the rice is to be added, it is usually garnished with carrots.
- Thiébou guerté or chebu gerte—"The Rice of Peanut." Peanuts are Senegal's most important cash crop. It too follows the same preparations and procedures as chebu yap and chebu ginaar, where the meat is first fried with herbs and spices. However, peanut butter is added to the dish, replacing mustard, which is added with water to allow the meat to soak up all the flavour. Creating a thick paste, rice is then added to the mix. This dish is not very well known and is rarely cooked by the Senegalese, but if so, only on special occasions.
- Yassa—Now popular in other West African countries, yassa is chicken or fish first marinated with spices, then simmered with onion, garlic, mustard, and lemon juice. This creates a chicken and onion sauce side-dish that is served with plain white rice. Yassa originated from the Jola people.
- Saadj or chere —a traditional millet couscous.
- Maafe—seasoned fish, chicken, lamb, or beef cooked with vegetables in a tomato and peanut butter sauce.
- Tchou or chu - a tomato-based stew with vegetables, especially onions, and fish balls.
- Bassi-salté— A traditional stew, consisting of seasoned meat cooked with tomato paste and vegetables over chere.
- Sombi—sweet milk-rice soup.
- Capitaine à la Saint-Louisienne—perch stuffed with spices.
- Caldou—a sauce with fish and vegetables.
- Fattaya—most often a street food, fried dough filled with French fries, a thick yassa onion sauce, a fried egg, and a bit of ketchup and hot sauce.
- Dibi- Senegalese barbecue, usually fire-grilled lamb but chicken or beef can also be found.
- Soupe kandia—okra soup.

== Desserts ==
- Thiakry—a couscous eaten with yogurt.
- Lakh - a pudding made with Thiakry grains and a more liquid yogurt (called "lait caillé" or soured milk).
- Ngalakh - a mixture of peanut butter and baobab pulp eaten with couscous
- Cinq centimes—the "five-cent cookie", a peanut cookie popular in marketplaces
- Sombi - a rice pudding made with coconut milk

== Drinks ==
- Bissap is the most popular beverage. It is a purplish-red juice made from hibiscus flowers, water and sugar. Fresh mint leaves and orange blossom are sometimes added.
- Other juices are also drunk: dakhar (tamarind juice), gingembre (ginger brew), bouye (brew made from baobab fruit), and ditakh.
- The consumption of fresh fruit juice is not very common.
- Attaya (made from Chinese gunpowder tea, sugar and mint) is also highly popular.
- Local beers (Gazelle and Flag brands) are available; however, alcohol consumption within the population is not very popular given that the majority of the population is Muslim (95%).

== Bibliography ==
- Tevi L. Adambounou: Application du principe de la déshydratation partielle par Osmose A: La conservation post-récolte de légumes tropicaux et tentatives d'introduction du produit fini dans les habitudes alimentaires sénégalaises, Université de Laval (Québec), 1983.
- Amadou Sarra Ba: Les goûts et les usages culinaires dans l’espace sénégambien VIII-XIX, Dakar, Université Cheikh Anta Diop, 2001.
- Monique Biarnès: La Cuisine sénégalaise, Paris, Société africaine d'édition, 1972.
- Tadeusz Lewicki: West African Food in the Middle Ages: According to Arabic Sources, Cambridge University Press, 2009, ISBN 978-0521102025
- Joséphine N'Diaye Haas: Cuisine Sénégalaise, L'Harmattan.
- Saurelle Diop: Cuisine sénégalaise d’hier et d’aujourd’hui
- Youssou N'Dour: La Cuisine de ma mère, Minerva, 2004 ISBN 2830707486
- Aminata Sow Fall: Un grain de vie et d'espérance, Éditions Françoise Truffaut, 2002 ISBN 2951661452
- Pierre Thiam: Yolele! Recipes from the Heart of Senegal, Lake Isle Press Inc., 2008 ISBN 978-1891105388 (the cookbook was finalist of the IACP Julia Child Cookbook Award and a Special Jury Award Winner at The Gourmand World Cookbook in Paris).
- Pierre Thiam: Senegal - Modern Senegalese Recipes from the Source to the Bowl, Lake Isle Press Inc., 2015.

== See also ==
- Gambian cuisine
- Guinean cuisine
- Mauritanian cuisine
- List of African cuisines
