= Kedjenou =

Spicy chicken stew from West Africa

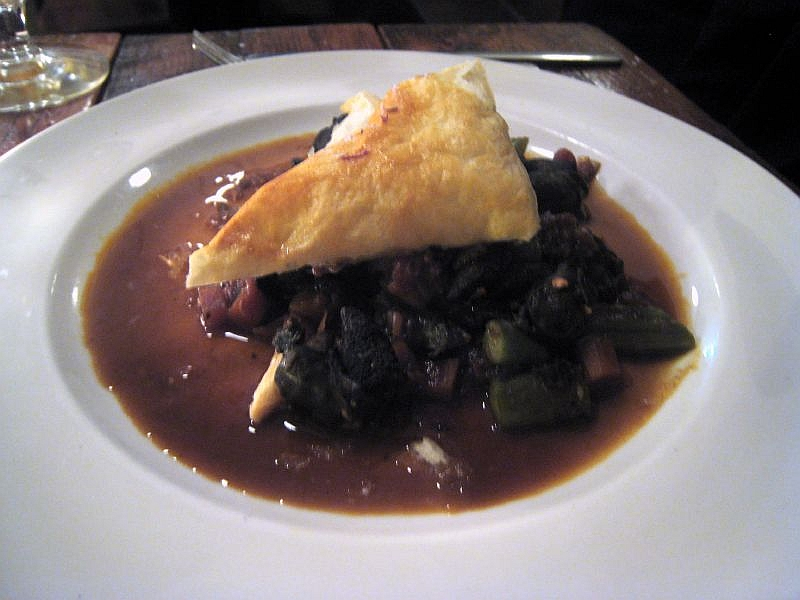
- A Kedjenou variant, prepared with escargot, okra and puff pastry
- Place of origin: Côte d'Ivoire
- Region or state: West Africa
- Main ingredients: Chicken or Guinea hen, vegetables

Kedjenou (also known as Kedjenou poulet and Kedjenou de Poulet) is a spicy stew that is slow-cooked in a sealed canari (terra-cotta pot) over fire or coals and prepared with chicken or guinea hen and vegetables. It is a traditional and popular dish of the cuisine of Côte d'Ivoire.

Preparation methods for the stew vary. Sometimes little or no added liquid is used in its preparation, allowing the meat to cook in its own juices, which tenderizes the meat and concentrates the flavors of the ingredients. Sometimes the dish is cooked in a wrapped and sealed banana leaf that is placed under hot coals. In Côte d'Ivoire, the dish is traditionally served with Attiéké, a side dish made with grated cassava.

== See also ==
- Ivorian cuisine - the cuisine of Côte d'Ivoire
- List of African dishes
- List of stews
