= Sombi =

Traditional West African dish

Sombi is a traditional West African dish, popular in Senegal. It is made from rice and coconut milk and served as a creamy, slightly sweet porridge or dessert.

== See also ==
- Cuisine of Senegal
- Jollof rice
- List of stews
- List of African dishes
