= Caldou =

Traditional dish in Senegal

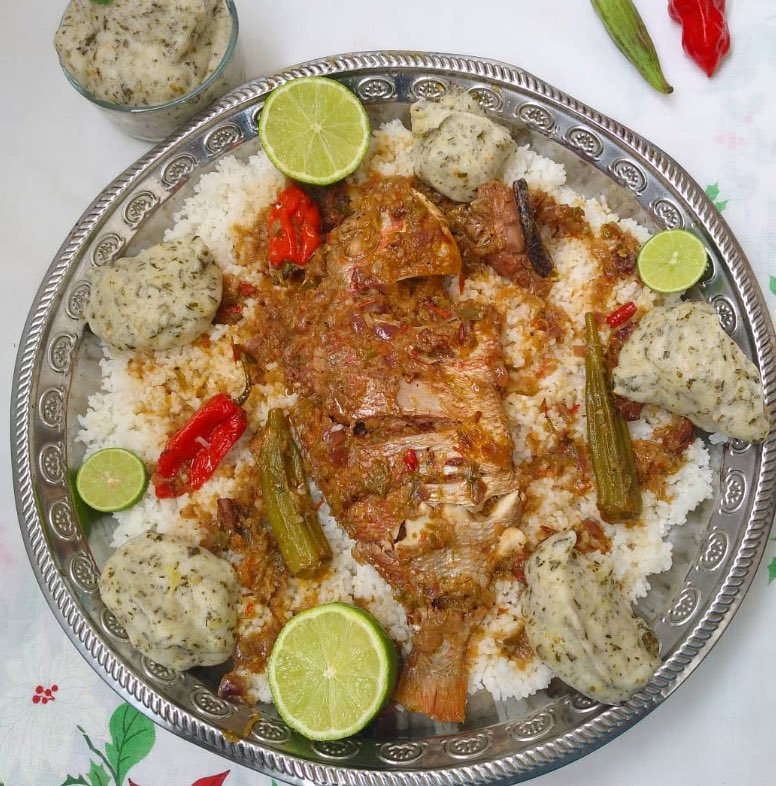
- Caldou or Kaldou
- Alternative names: Kaldou
- Place of origin: Senegal

Caldou, also spelled kaldou, is a traditional dish from Senegal, particularly associated with the coastal regions. It is a broth-based meal primarily prepared with fresh fish and vegetables. The dish shares some visual similarities with the popular Senegalese Yassa, another fish-based dish, but differs significantly in its flavor profile and preparation techniques.

At its core, Caldou is built around the natural flavors of fresh fish, which are simmered in a broth. The sauce is enhanced with ingredients like onions, tomatoes, and a blend of local spices. Often, tamarind or lime juice is added, lending the dish its signature tangy taste. The fish is cooked gently to retain its tenderness, while the vegetables, such as carrots, cassava, and potatoes, provide a balance of textures and flavors. The simplicity of the ingredients allows the freshness of the seafood to shine through, making caldou a distinctive Senegalese culinary experience.

Traditionally served with rice, Caldou reflects the country's deep connection to the sea and its rich agricultural heritage. Although similar to yassa in appearance due to the presence of fish and vegetables, Caldou's flavor is more delicate, often described as lighter and more fragrant compared to the bold, lemony kick of yassa.

This dish is a great representation of Senegalese cuisine, highlighting the importance of fresh, local ingredients and the cultural significance of fish as a staple food in the region.
