= Ivorian cuisine =

Culinary traditions of Ivory Coast

Location of Ivory Coast

Ivorian cuisine is the traditional cuisine of Côte d'Ivoire, and is based on tubers, grains, pig, chicken, seafood, fish, fresh fruits, vegetables and spices. It is very similar to that of neighboring countries in West Africa. Common staple foods include grains and tubers. Côte d'Ivoire is one of the largest cocoa producers in the world and also produces palm oil and coffee.

== Common foods and dishes ==
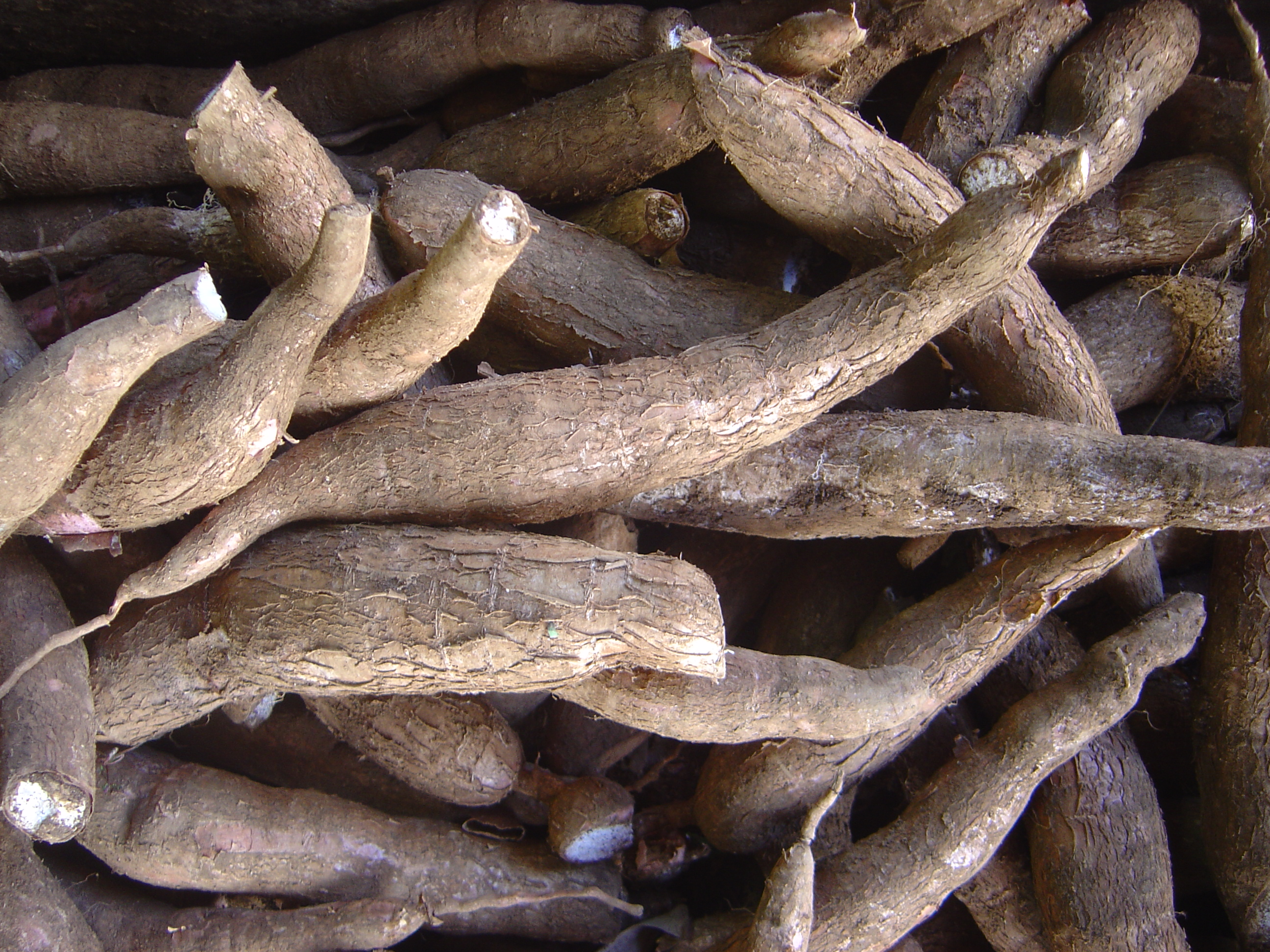
Raw cassava

Cassava and plantains are significant parts of Ivorian cuisine. A maize paste called aitiu is used to prepare corn balls, and peanuts are widely used in dishes. Attiéké is a popular side dish in Côte d'Ivoire made with grated cassava and is very similar in taste and consistency to couscous. A common street-vended food is alloco, which is ripe plantain banana fried in palm oil, spiced with a spicy sauce made of onions and chili. It can be eaten alone as a snack or often with a hard-boiled egg, as well as a side dish.

Grilled fish and grilled chicken are the most popular non-vegetarian foods. Lean, low-fat Guinea fowl, which is popular in the region, is commonly referred as poulet bicyclette. Seafood includes tuna, sardines, shrimp and bonito. Smoked fish is also common, as it is all over West Africa.

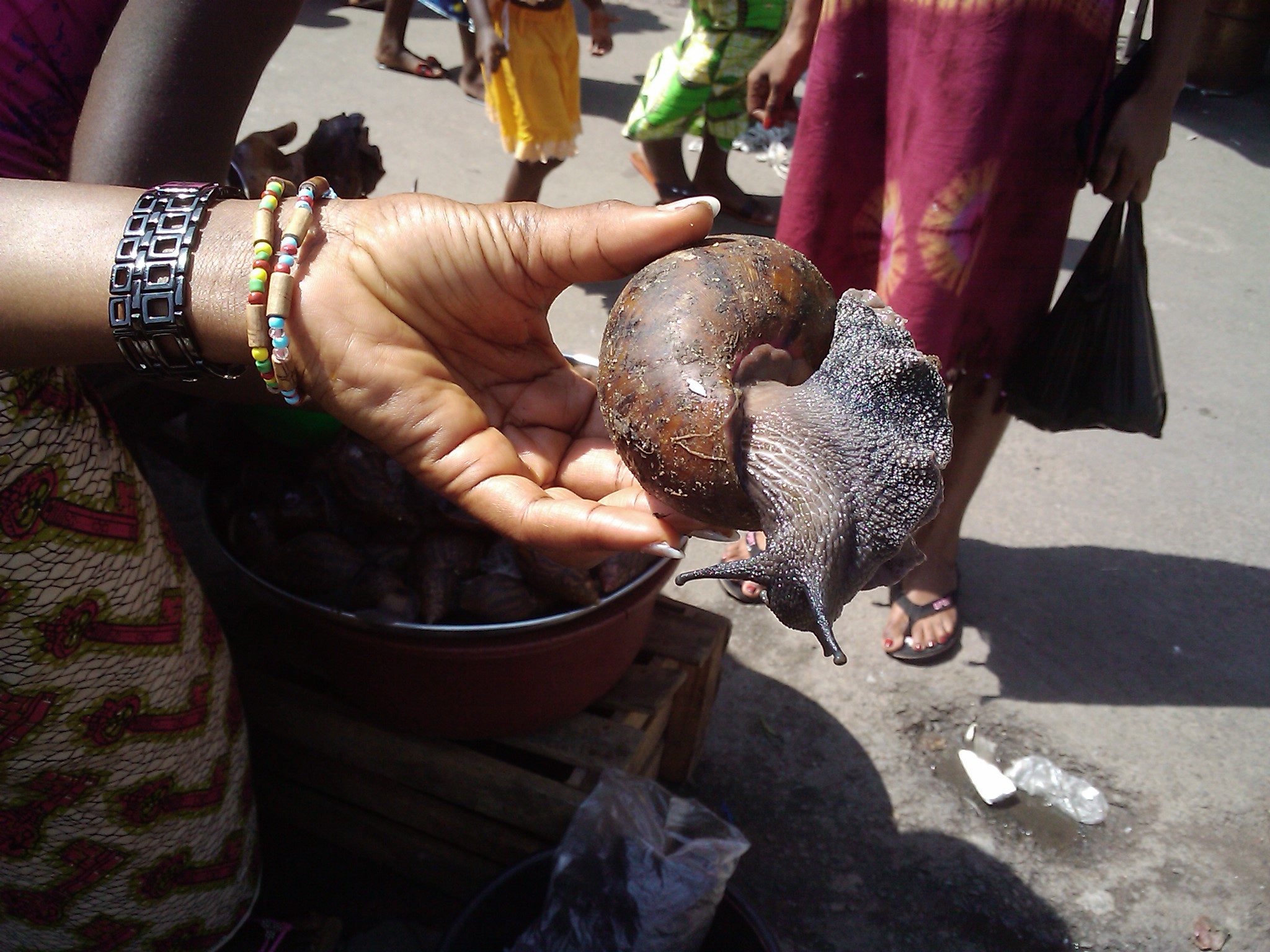
Ivorian snails

Maafe (pronounced "mafeh") is a common dish consisting of meat in a peanut sauce.

Slow-simmered stews with various ingredients are another common food staple in Côte d'Ivoire. Kedjenou is a spicy stew consisting of chicken and vegetables that are slow-cooked in a sealed pot with little or no added liquid. This concentrates the flavors of the chicken and vegetables and tenderizes the chicken. It is usually cooked in a pottery jar called a canari, over a low fire, or cooked in an oven.

Cow's foot is an ingredient "in everything", skin on, boiled for hours into a jelly.

Ivorian land snails are huge and a local delicacy, commonly grilled or eaten in sauce.

=== Fruits and vegetables ===
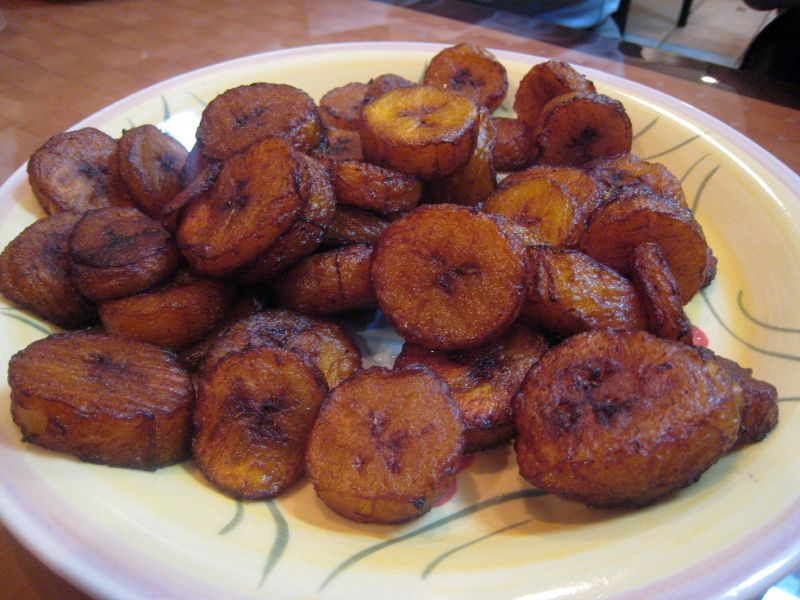
Alloco (fried plantains)

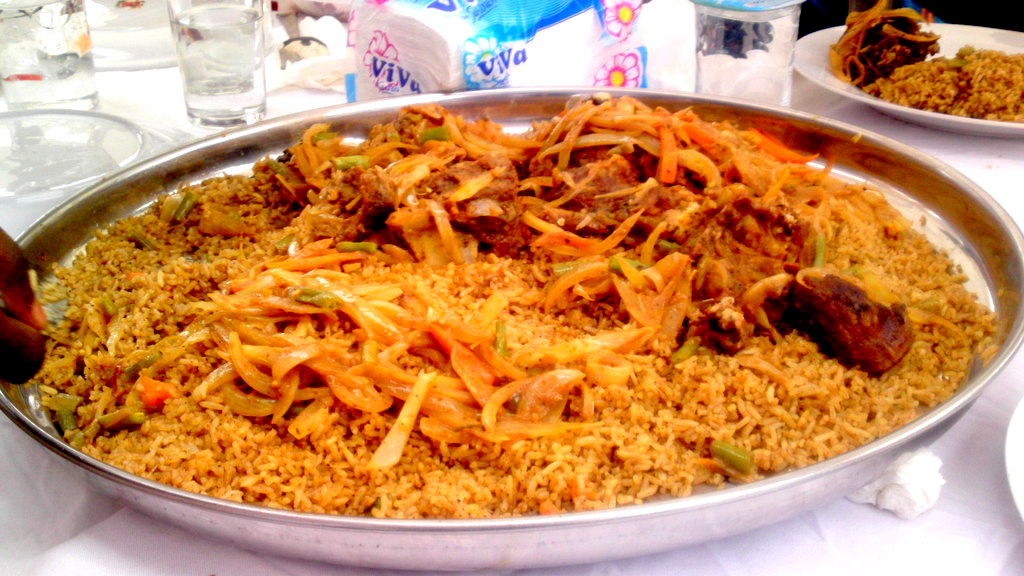
Riz gras

Widely consumed fruits include mandarins, mango, passionfruit, soursops and coconuts. Eggplant is a commonly used vegetable in many dishes. Foufou is a dish consisting of mashed plantains and palm oil, whereas foutou is made from mashed plantains and yam. Foutu banane, beaten until stretchy to the touch, might be matched with and used to eat sauce graine, palm nuts crushed into paste topped with bright red oil.

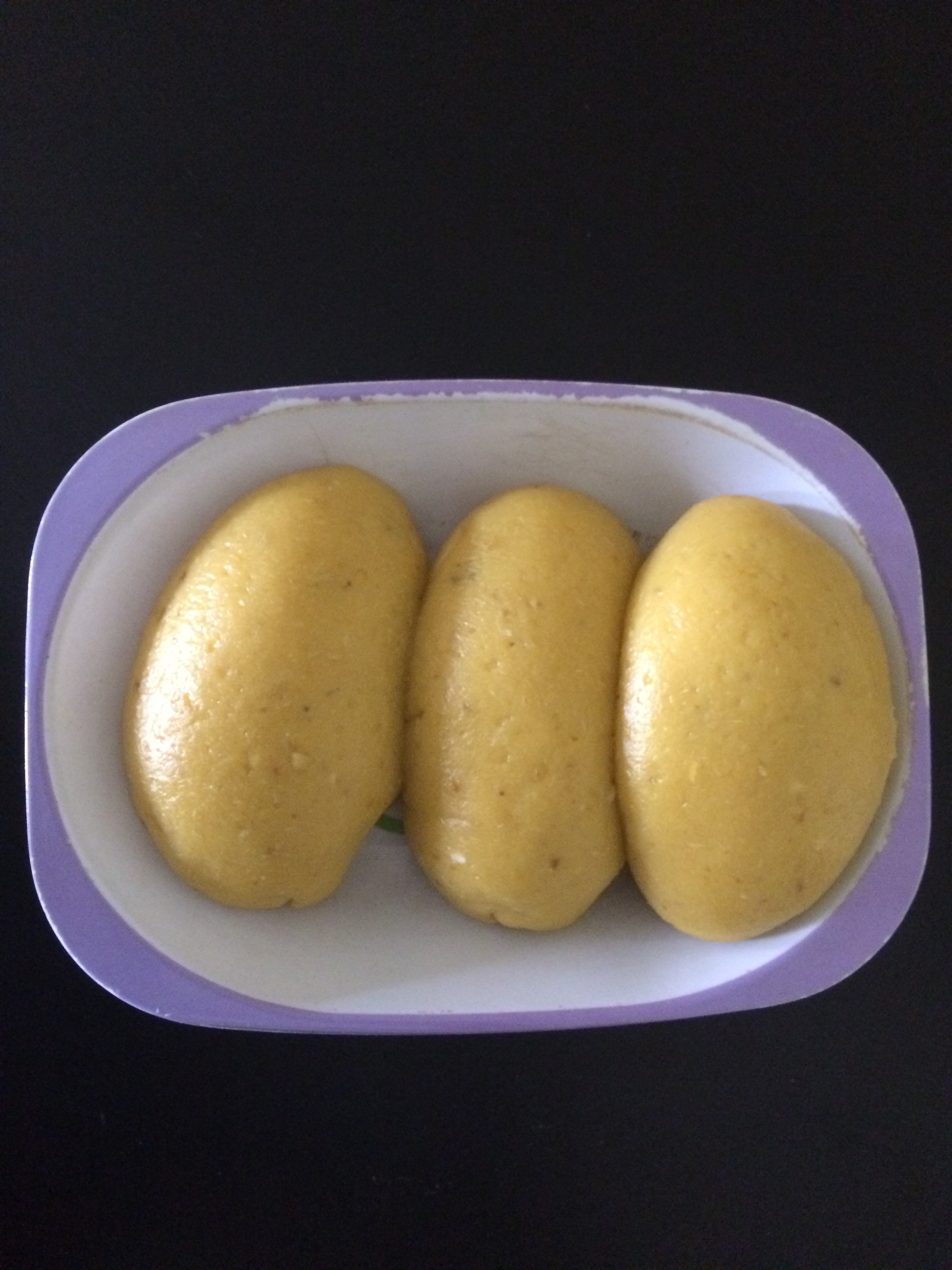
Foutu banane

Gombo frais (fresh okra) is a stew of tomato pieces, palm oil and okra chopped together. It might be served with a side dish of alloco (fried plantains), or riz gras (fatty rice), an Ivorian version of the West African jollof rice in which the fattened grains are "cooked in a soup that's built from onions fried into a sugary sweat and simmered with garlic, fresh tomatoes and tomato paste, for layers of bright and dark."

Attiéké, "fermented cassava pulp grated and molded into tiny couscous-like orbs" has a bland taste but can be served with Scotch peppers or Maggi bouillon.

== Beverages ==
Bangui is a local palm wine. Gnamakoudji is pulped ginger squeezed through cheesecloth and then mellowed with pineapple juice, lemon and vanilla. Nyamanku is a local non-alcoholic beverage made from ground ginger root mixed with the juices of oranges, pineapples, and lemons.

== Maquis restaurants ==
Ivorians have a kind of small, open-air restaurant called a maquis, unique to Côte d'Ivoire. Maquis normally feature braised chicken and fish served with onions and tomatoes, attiéké or kedjenou.

== See also ==
- African cuisine
- West African cuisine
- List of African cuisines
- List of African dishes
