= Senegalese tea culture =

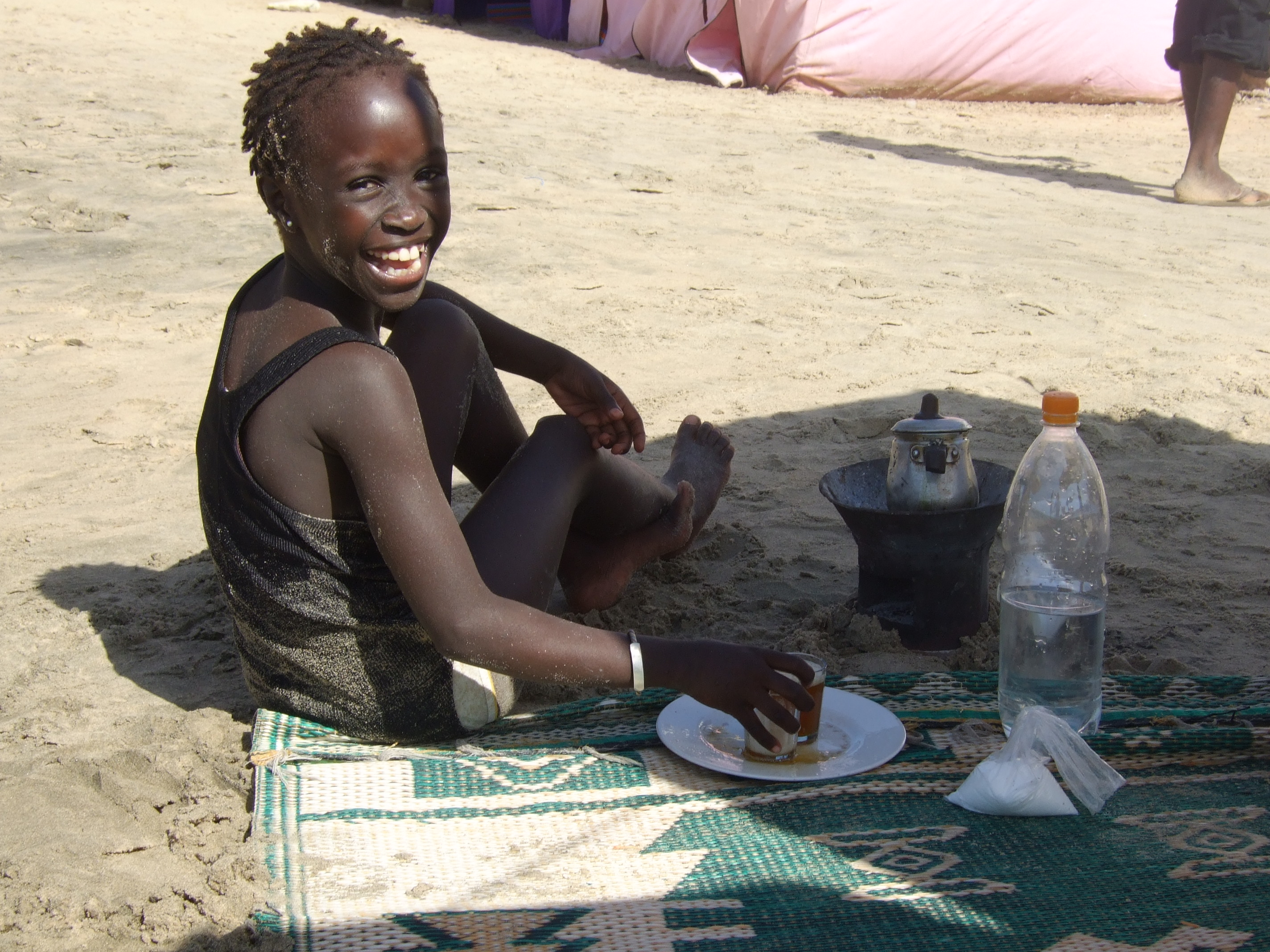
A five-year-old girl preparing tea near Dakar, Senegal.

Senegalese tea culture is an important part of daily social life. The Senegalese tea-drinking custom is essentially similar to those of other countries in the West Africa region, such as Mali, Guinea, Gambia and Mauritania. In and around Senegal, tea is prepared and presented in an elaborate process, and known in the Wolof language as attaya, ataya or ataaya.

== Making ataya ==
Sometimes made with mint, the drink is particularly served as a social occasion after meals, and it's the beverage that is typically offered to friends and visitors. Drinking attaya is seen to promote conversation and maintain friendship because it takes a long time to prepare properly. Indeed, some authors have referenced the act of making ataya as a form of practical relaxation along with meditation and yoga.

Senegalese-style attaya is served in three separate stages, called "the three concoctions":

Chinese green tea leaves are put into the teapot with some water and mint leaves and boiled over a charcoal stove. Sugar is added to the teapot and the tea is poured into small glasses of a certain height and then poured back and forth from the glass to the teapot several times so that foam appears in the glass. The thicker the foam, the better the tea.

One cookbook of African recipes recommends serving the tea immediately with a generous amount of sugar:

The Western African style of serving involves holding the tea pot high above the table and pouring the hot tea at least twelve inches through the air into small glasses. (Glasses made of glass, not porcelain cups.) If the sugar is added to the pot, the tea is sometimes poured from the glasses back into the pot (before anyone has sipped) and the process is repeated. This mixes the sugar into the tea. Western Africans generally drink their tea very sweet.

The first glass has been described as having an intense sweetness that cancels out a strident tannic bitterness to give a shot that is almost narcotic in its effect. The second glass is sweeter and the third is very sweet but much reduced in its bitterness because the same leaves are used to prepare all three glasses.

Words used in various ethnic languages to refer to the tea, the tiny metal teapot and the mint are typically borrowed from Arabic, pointing to the idea that Senegalese mint tea is of Moorish origin.

More than 80% of the population from 15 to 60 years of age drink tea. Studies have shown that due to the high concentration of fluoride in green tea, the practice may aid in preventing dental diseases, specifically dental caries.

== In music ==
The cultural importance of Senegalese tea drinking was underlined in the song Ataya, a track on Ismaël Lô's 1986 album, Natt.

== See also ==
- Senegalese cuisine
