= Chop bar =

Eatery in Ghana

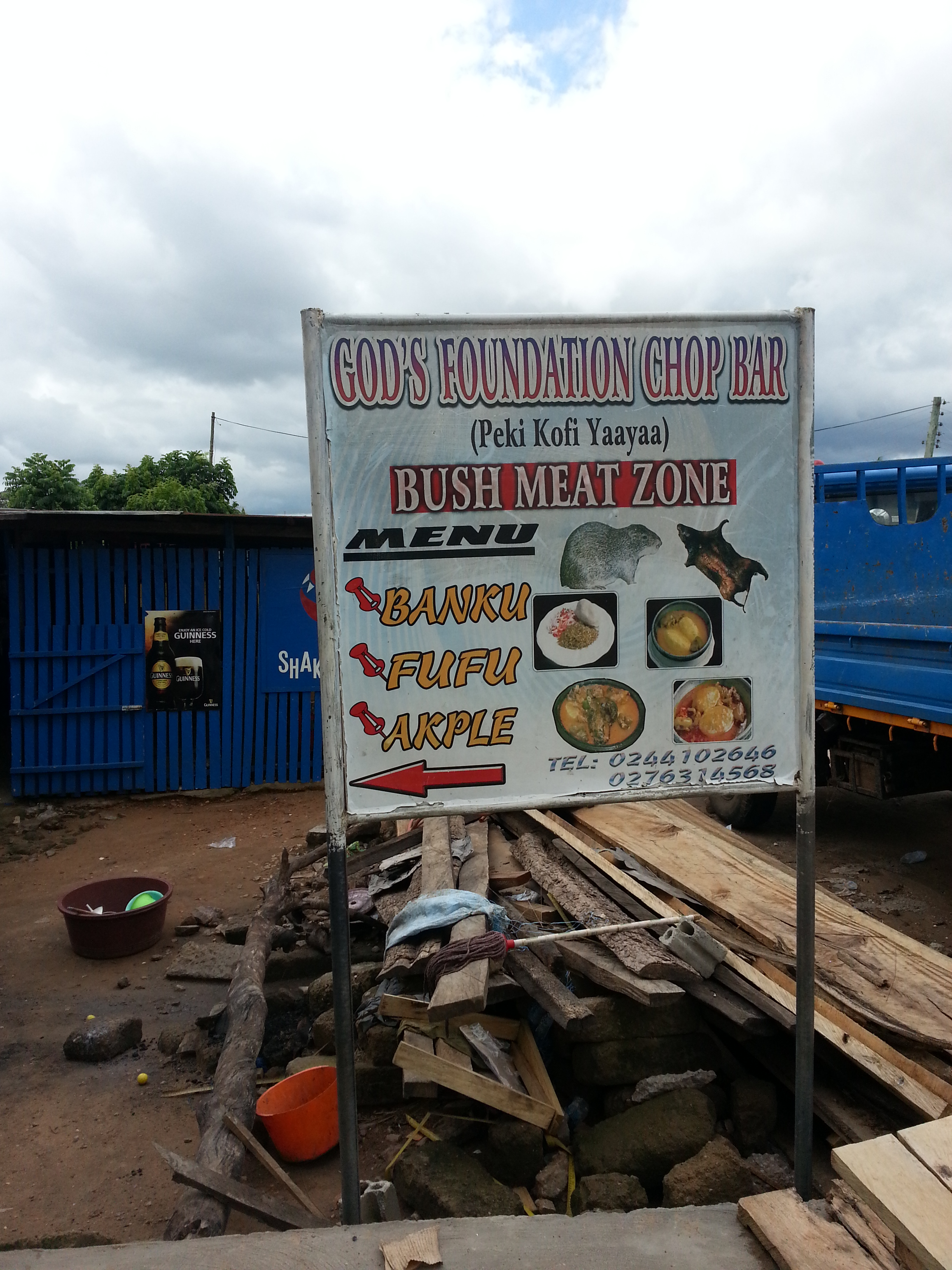
A sign board of a chop bar

A chop bar is a traditional eatery in Ghana mostly located in the country's south. In Ghanaian pidgin, "to chop" means "to eat".

Chop bars mostly sell dishes of Ghanaian cuisine, such as fufu, banku, konkonte, and omotuo (rice balls) with different soups. Meals are served in local earthenware bowls and foods are usually eaten at the premises. Most of these bars are stocked with local alcoholic drinks with few foreign drinks available. It is a cultural icon of Ghana, and is popular among the locals.

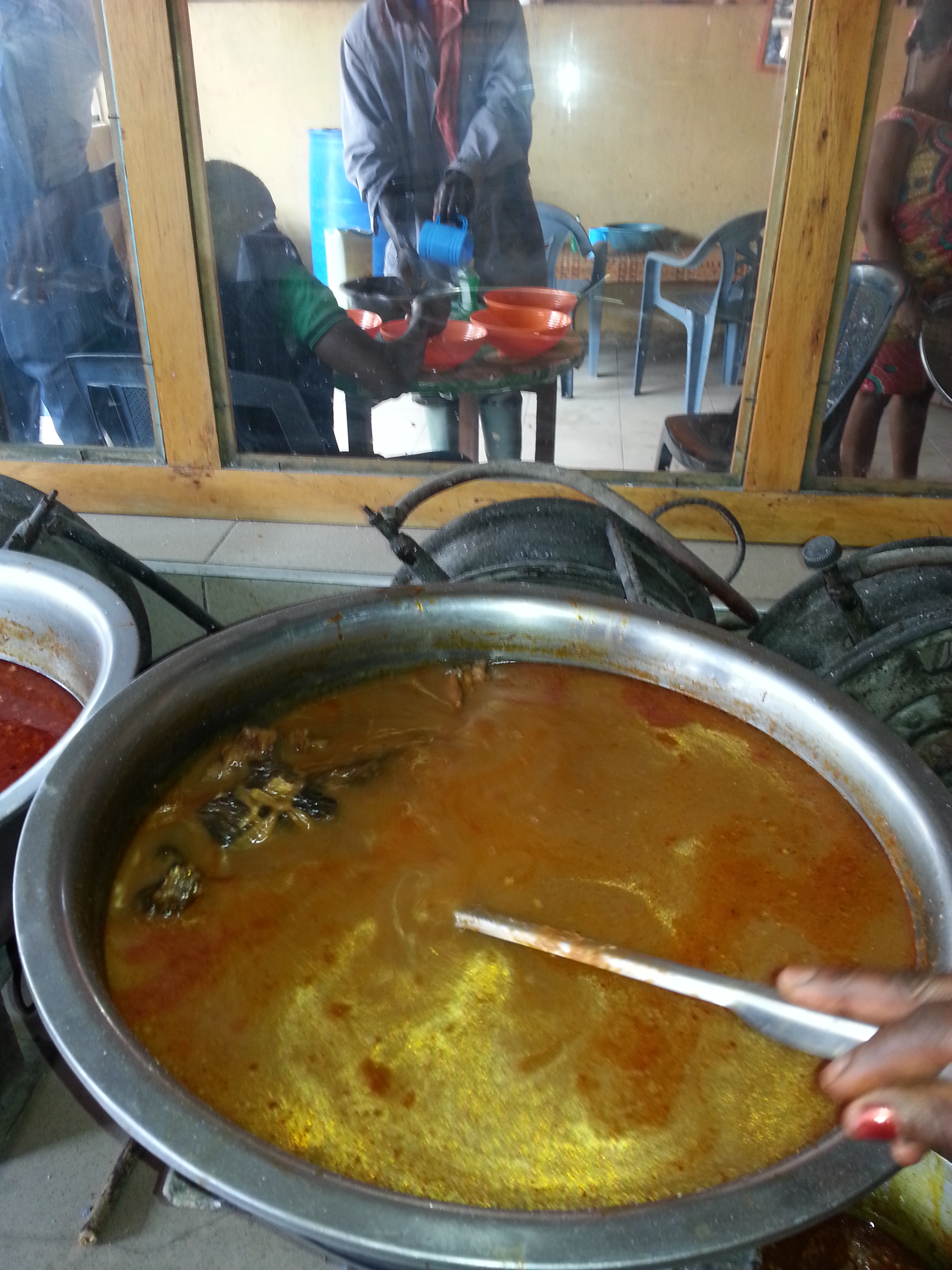
Palm nut soup in a chop bar

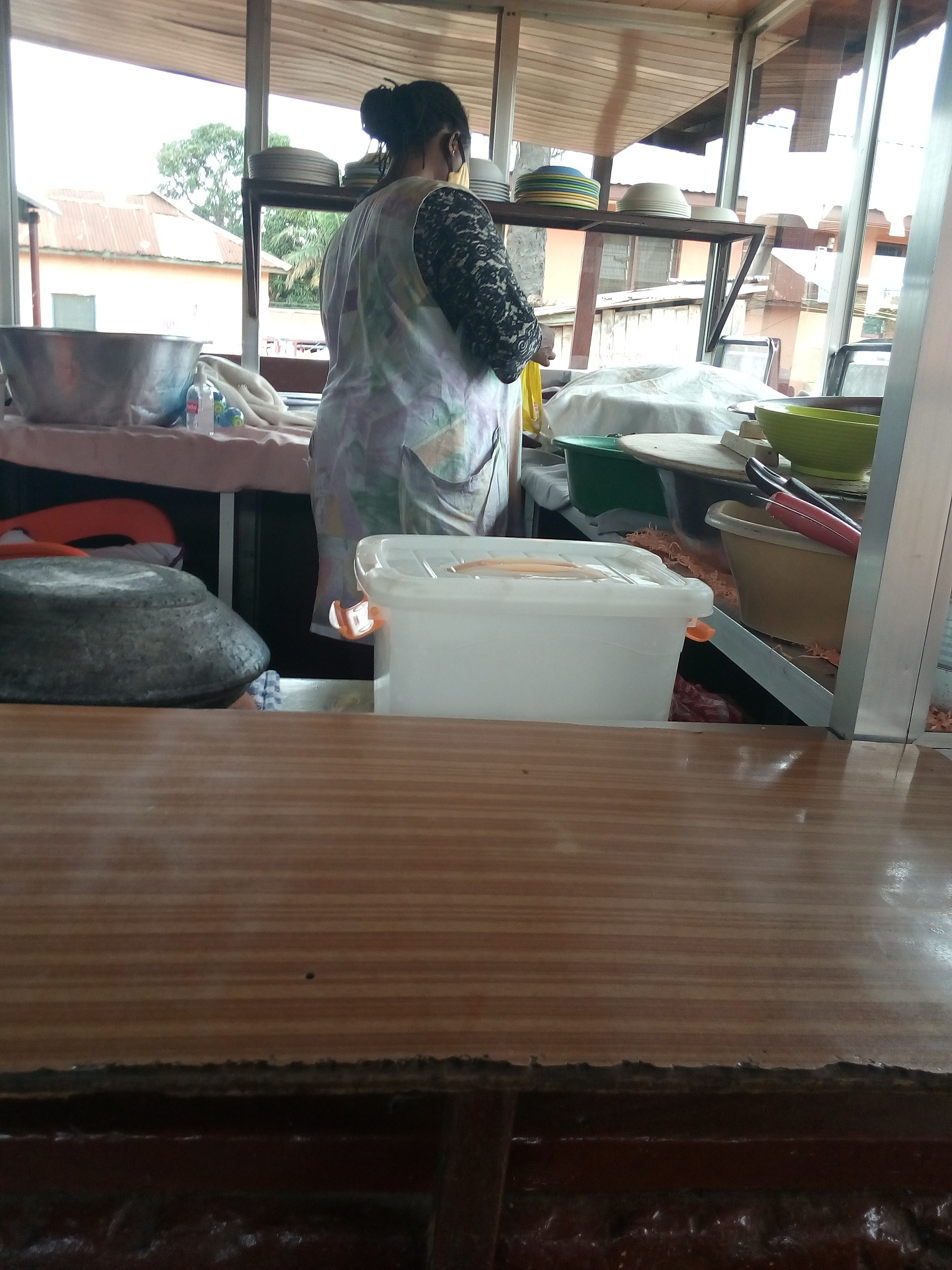
Banku seller
