= Yassa (food) =

Senegalese spicy marinated poultry or fish dish

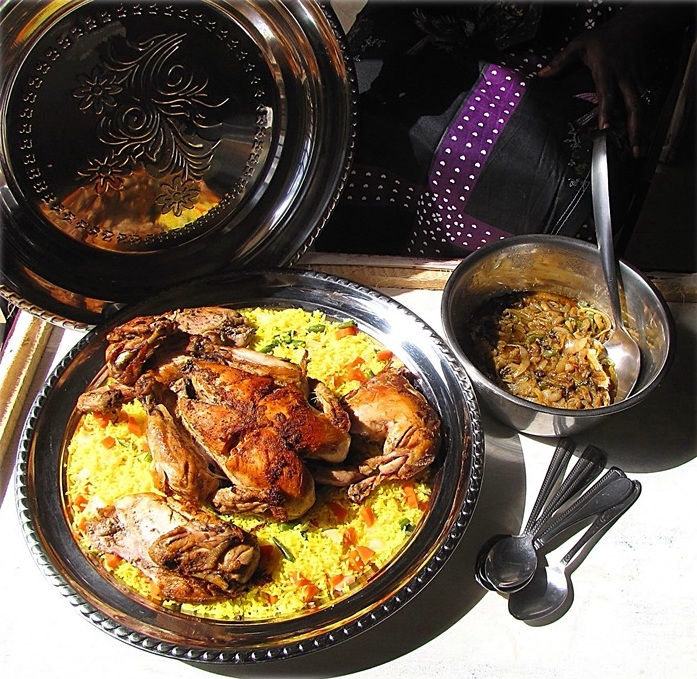
- Chicken yassa
- Course: Main
- Place of origin: Senegal
- Region or state: West Africa
- Associated cuisine: Senegalese cuisine
- Serving temperature: Hot
- Main ingredients: Poultry, fish or lamb, onions, lemon, and mustard

Yassa is a spicy dish prepared with onions, lemon or mustard and marinated poultry, fish, or lamb. Originally from Senegal, it has become popular throughout West Africa. Other names for chicken yassa include yassa au poulet (in French) and yassa ganaar. The term "yassa" refers to the method of cooking (marinated and stewed), while "guinar" means chicken in Wolof, the national language of Senegal. Yassa Guinar is commonly prepared in the southern region of Casamance and across other parts of West Africa. It is one of the most iconic dishes of Senegalese cuisine and is known for its tangy, savory flavor, derived from its distinctive onion and citrus-based sauce.

== Ingredients ==
While variations exist, a standard yassa ganaar recipe includes:

- Chicken (usually cut into serving pieces)
- Onions (large quantity, often 4–6 large onions per chicken)
- Fresh lemon or lime juice
- Dijon mustard or local mustard
- Garlic and chili peppers
- Black pepper and salt
- Vegetable oil
- Bouillon cubes

== Preparation ==
Preparation of yassa ganaar:

- Marinate the chicken with lemon juice, mustard, garlic, chili, black pepper, and thinly sliced onions. Let it sit for several hours or overnight.
- Brown the chicken, either by grilling or frying, to add depth of flavor.
- In a large pot, sauté the marinated onions until caramelized and soft.
- Add the browned chicken pieces back to the pot, along with the remaining marinade.
- Simmer the dish until the chicken is fully cooked and the sauce is rich and flavorful.
- Serve hot, typically over steamed white rice.

== See also ==
- List of African dishes
- List of chicken dishes
- List of fish dishes
