= Acheke =

Traditional Ivorian dish

Attieke
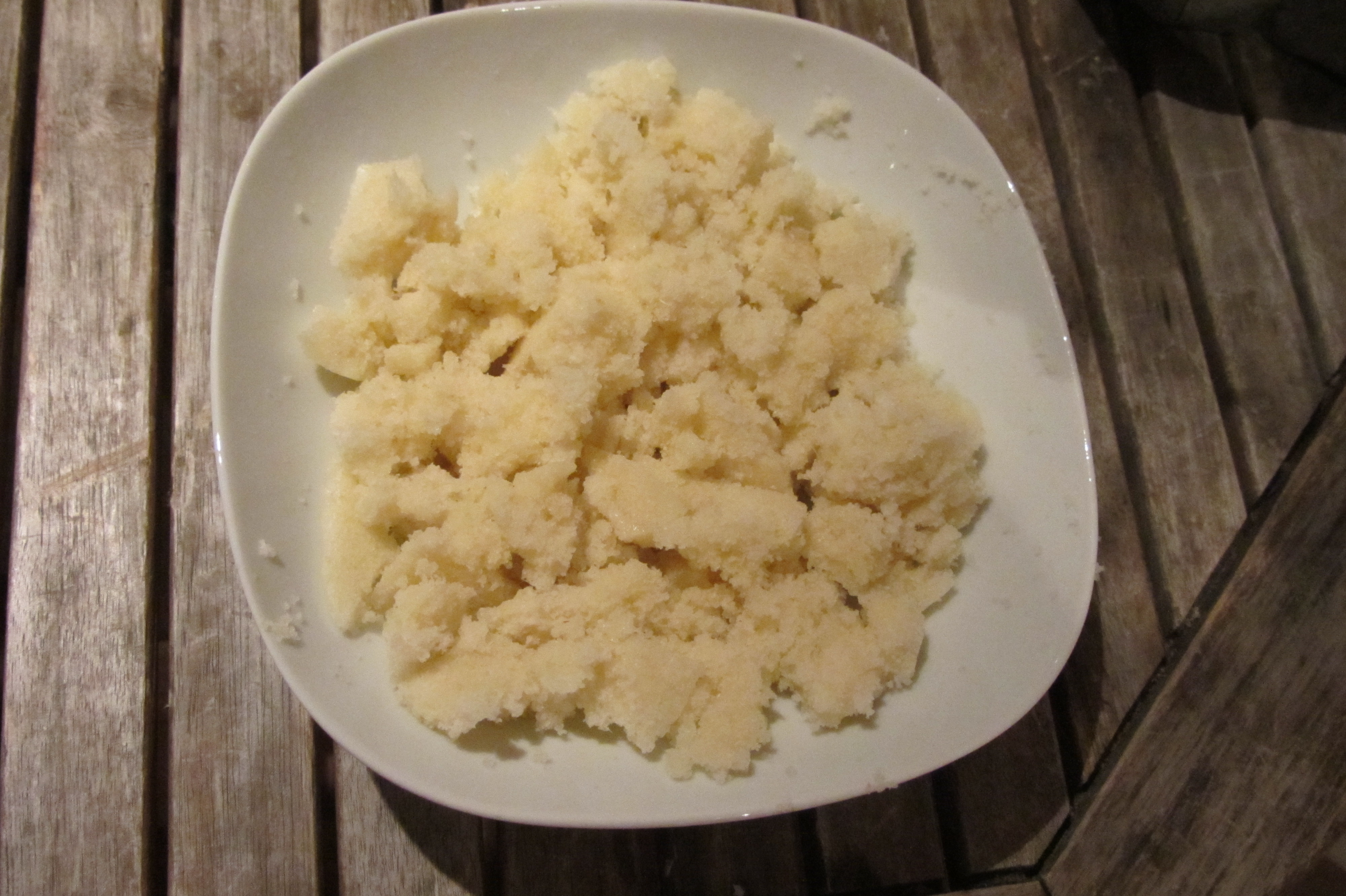
- Alternative names: Attieké, Akyɛkɛ
- Place of origin: Southern Côte d'Ivoire, western Ghana
- Region or state: West Africa
- Main ingredients: Fermented and grated cassava
- Variations: 2
Nutritional value
(per serving)
- Protein: g
- Fat: 0.1 g
- Carbohydrate: 84 g

Acheke (Bambara: cɛkɛ) (Nzema; Akyɛkɛ) (correct spelling being attiéké (Ivory Coast) or akyeke (Ghana)), is a dish made from cassava that is popular and traditional in the Côte d’Ivoire and Ghana. The dish is prepared from fermented cassava pulp that has been grated or granulated. Dried acheke is also prepared, which is similar in texture to couscous.

Attiéké is a culinary specialty of the lagoon people (Ebrié, Adjoukrou, Alladjan, Abidji, Avikam, Ahizi, Attie) of southern Côte d’Ivoire and the Nzema people of Ghana's Western Region.

The word attiéké comes from the word "adjèkè" from the Ebrié language spoken in southern Côte d'Ivoire. The pronunciation of the word was distorted by the Bambara transporters into "atchèkè" and then by the French colonists into "attiéké". It is made from grated cassava that is fermented, and is flavorful when eaten with fried fish with ground spicy pepper garnished with chopped pepper, and onions with a little seasoning for taste added mixed with regular oil.

Attiéké is an accessible and affordable meal that has become a staple in family meals, but also in restaurants and during ceremonies. The knowledge and skills related to the making of the dish play an important role in the social life of communities. Among Ghana's Nzema community, one is said not to be a true Nzema if they have never had akyeke.

Attiéké it is very distinct from gari as it is mostly sold in a form that keeps a certain level of hydration. For exportation purpose, there now exist a dehydrated form of Attiéké that shouldn't be confounded with gari.

== Preparation method ==
The cassava is peeled, grated, and mixed with a small amount of previously fermented cassava as the starter. (This starter has different names depending on the ethnic group that produces it: mangnan Ebrié lidjrou in Adjoukrou and bêdêfon in Alladjan.) The paste is left to ferment for one or two days. Once the fermentation time is over and the vast majority of the hydrocyanic acid that exists in a large proportion in bitter cassava has been removed, the pulp is dewatered, screened, and dried, and finally cooked by steaming. After a few minutes of cooking, the attiéké is ready for consumption. It is best served with grilled fish and pepper or tomato.

Such as Moroccan couscous, Attiéké is available in different grain size, depending on the region it comes from. One of the most commercialized form is a bigger size called "Abodjama" widely produced by traders who are not necessarily from one of the ethnic group where Attiéké originated from. It is a version made for commercialization. The different original versions of Attiéké have different and recognizable tastes that reflect the richness of the original cooking methods.

Attiéké sold at markets is cooked. It is ready to be eaten without further cooking. When it dries off, it needs to be reheated.

== Heritage ==
In December 2024, attieke was recognized by UNESCO as an Intangible cultural heritage.

== See also ==
- Fufu
- Ivorian cuisine
- List of African dishes
