= Omo tuo =

Ghanaian staple food made with rice

Omo Tuo
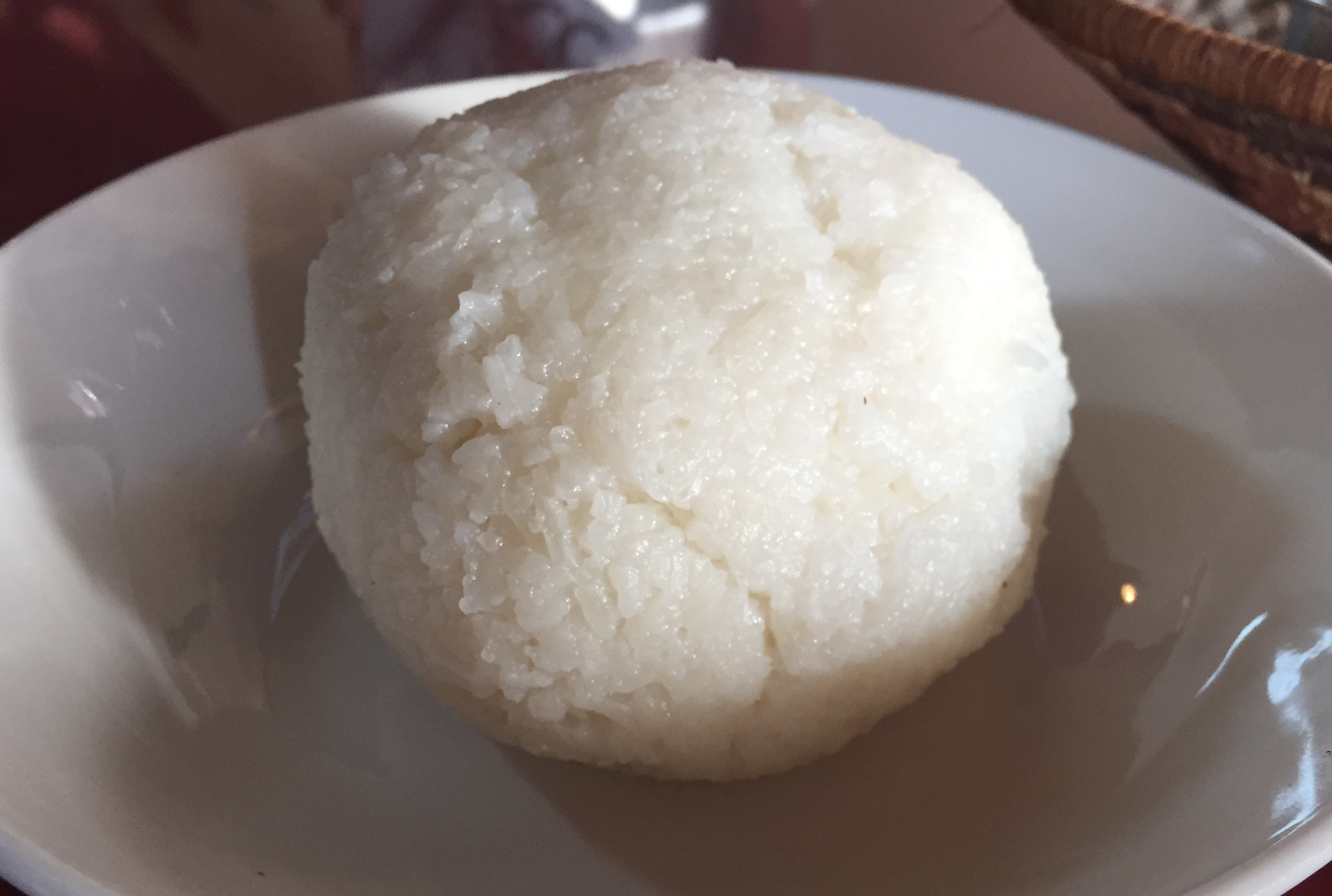
- Balls of Omo Tuo
- Type: Swallow
- Course: Pepper, Stew, Soup
- Place of origin: Ghana
- Serving temperature: Hot
- Main ingredients: Rice, salt and water

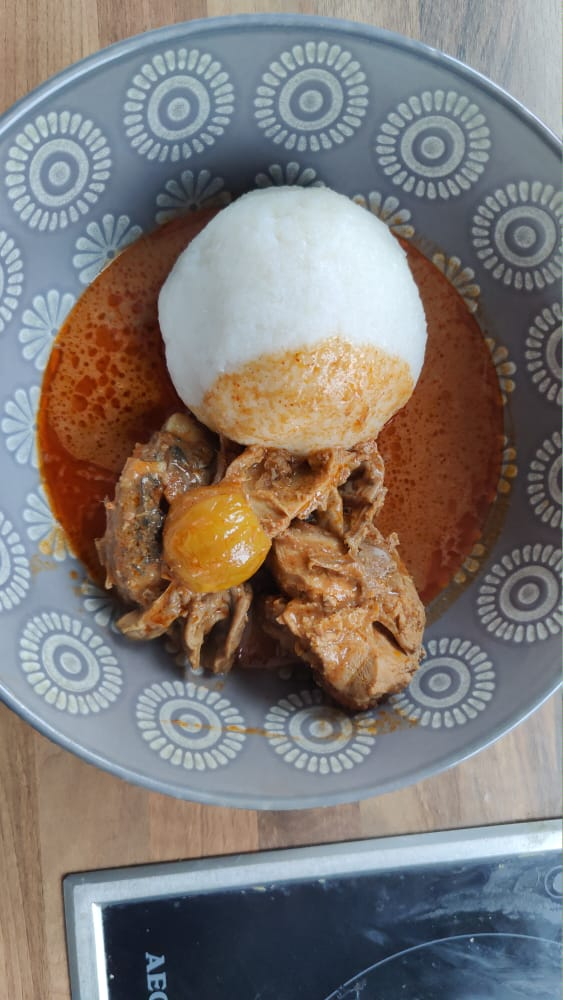
Omo tuo with groundnut soup and meat.

Omo tuo (Twi: ɛmo tuo; "rice balls") is a Ghanaian staple food made with rice. Mostly, "broken rice" or long grain rice broken into smaller pieces is used. It is a Ghanaian version of the Nigerian Hausa staple Tuwon Shinkafa, which provides the name “Tuwo” used in this dish and in “Tuwo Zaafi”, another popular Ghanaian dish with Hausa origins. The rice is usually cooked with more water than usual to make it softer. It is then beaten to make it smooth, after which it is shaped into sizable balls. In Ghana, it is usually served with soup made of groundnut or palmnut. In Nigeria, it may accompany miyan kuka (dried okra and baobab leaf soup).
