= Palaver sauce =

West African stew

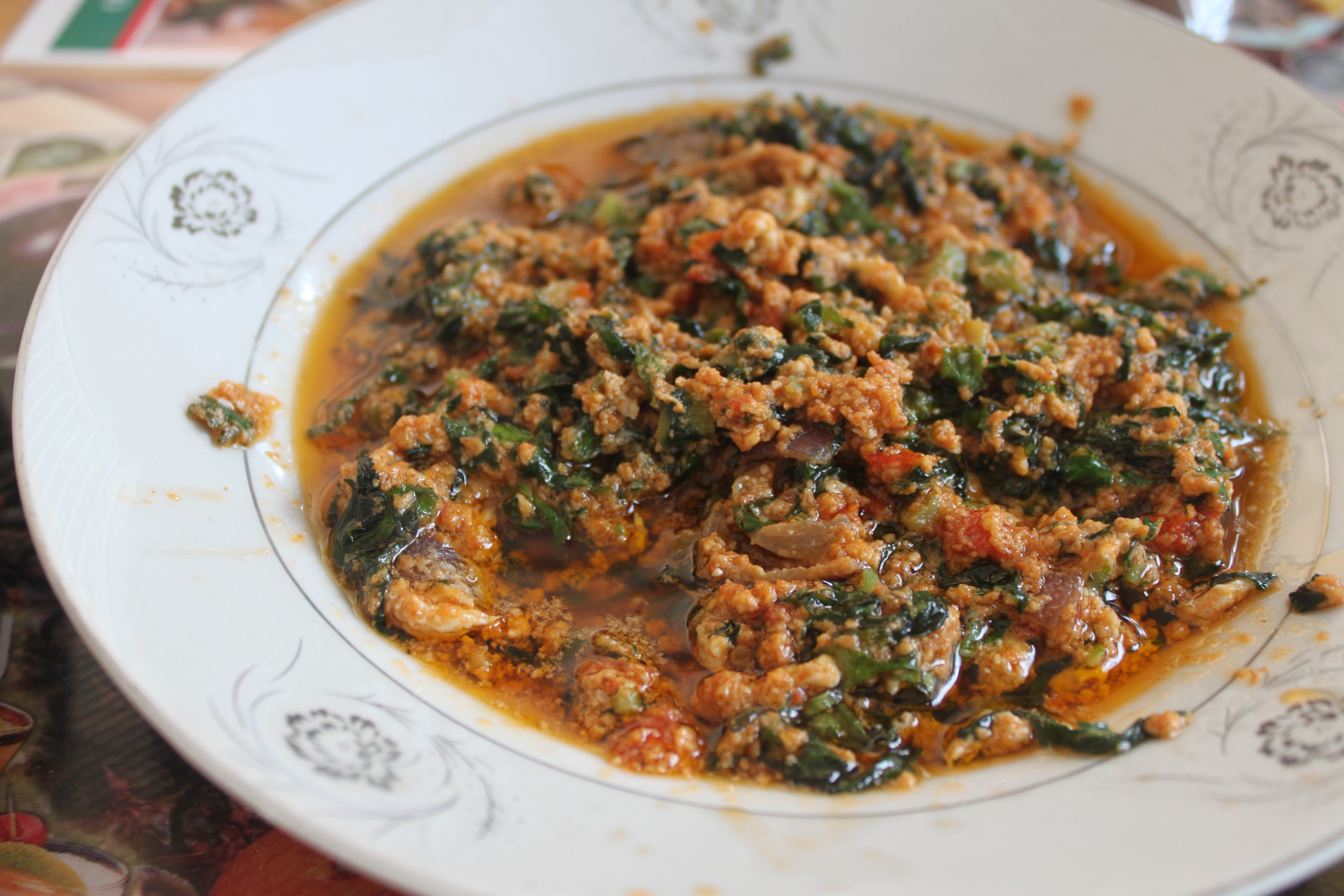
- Ghanaian palaver sauce
- Alternative names: Palava sauce
- Type: Stew

Palaver sauce or palava sauce (or plasas) is a type of stew widely eaten in West Africa, including Ghana, Liberia, Sierra Leone. The word palaver, meaning a talk, lengthy debate or quarrel, derives from the Portuguese language; palavra in general use means "speech" or "word", with its origins ultimately from the Late Latin noun parabola, meaning "speech" or "parable". It is unclear how this led to the name of the stew. One theory is that the spices used in the stew mingle together like raised voices in an argument. It has been thought of as having the power to calm tensions, or to cause them. Other names for the dish include kontonmire, kentumere, nkontommire and pla'sas.

It has regional variations and can contain beef, fish, shrimp, pepitas, cassava, taro (cocoyam) leaves, and palm oil. It is served with boiled rice, potatoes, garri, fufu or yam. Outside of Africa, spinach is often used as a substitute for other greens. The leaves used to make this soup in Liberia are called molokhia or mulukhiyah leaves.

The name "palava sauce" is said to originate from the people of Elmina, on the south-east coast of Ghana.

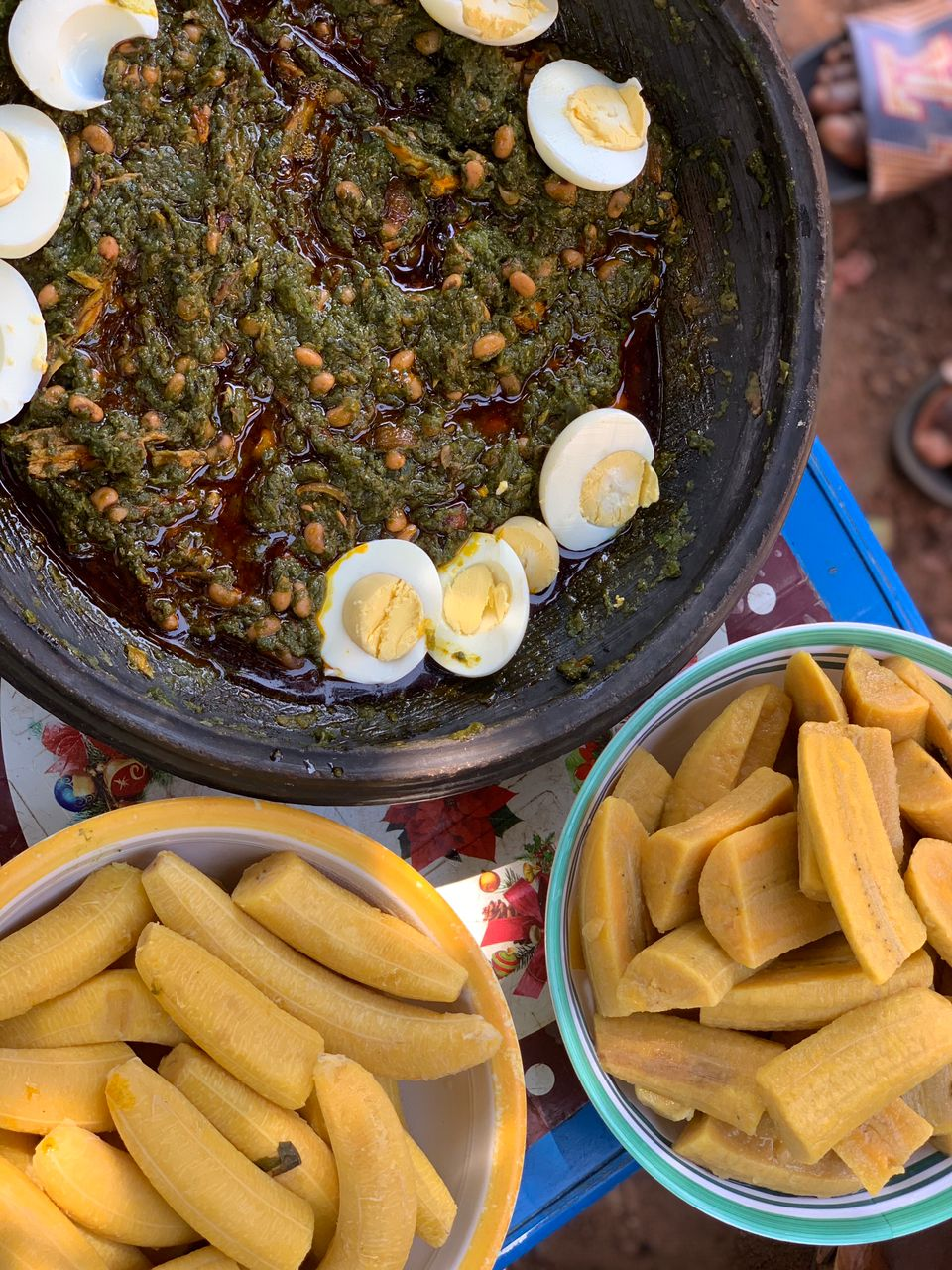
Kontomire stew with eggs and plantain

== Ghana ==
Kontomire stew is a stew made from cocoyam leaves (known in the Akan language as kontomire), commonly prepared in the home and very popular in Ghanaian cuisine. In Ghana, kontomire stew is served with variety of dishes, including steamed rice, cooked yam and plantain.

Preparing kontomire stew

== Recipe ==
The meat is first cut into small pieces and is fried in palm oil in a pan, and to the pan is added onion, pepper and chilli. Next is added the fish, dried or smoked, previously moistened and cut in chunks. The vegetables are sliced and incorporated into the cooking pan (spinach leaves or bean leaves, cabbage, kale, okra), and finally water is poured to help in the cooking and spices for seasoning. The mixture is kept on a low fire until all the ingredients are cooked and the water has reduced. It may be served with white rice.

In Ghana, the stew consists primarily of:

- cocoyam leaves
- palm oil
- egusi
- dried fish
- fresh tomatoes
- pepper
- egg

== See also ==
- African cuisine
- List of African dishes
- List of stews

== GALLERY ==
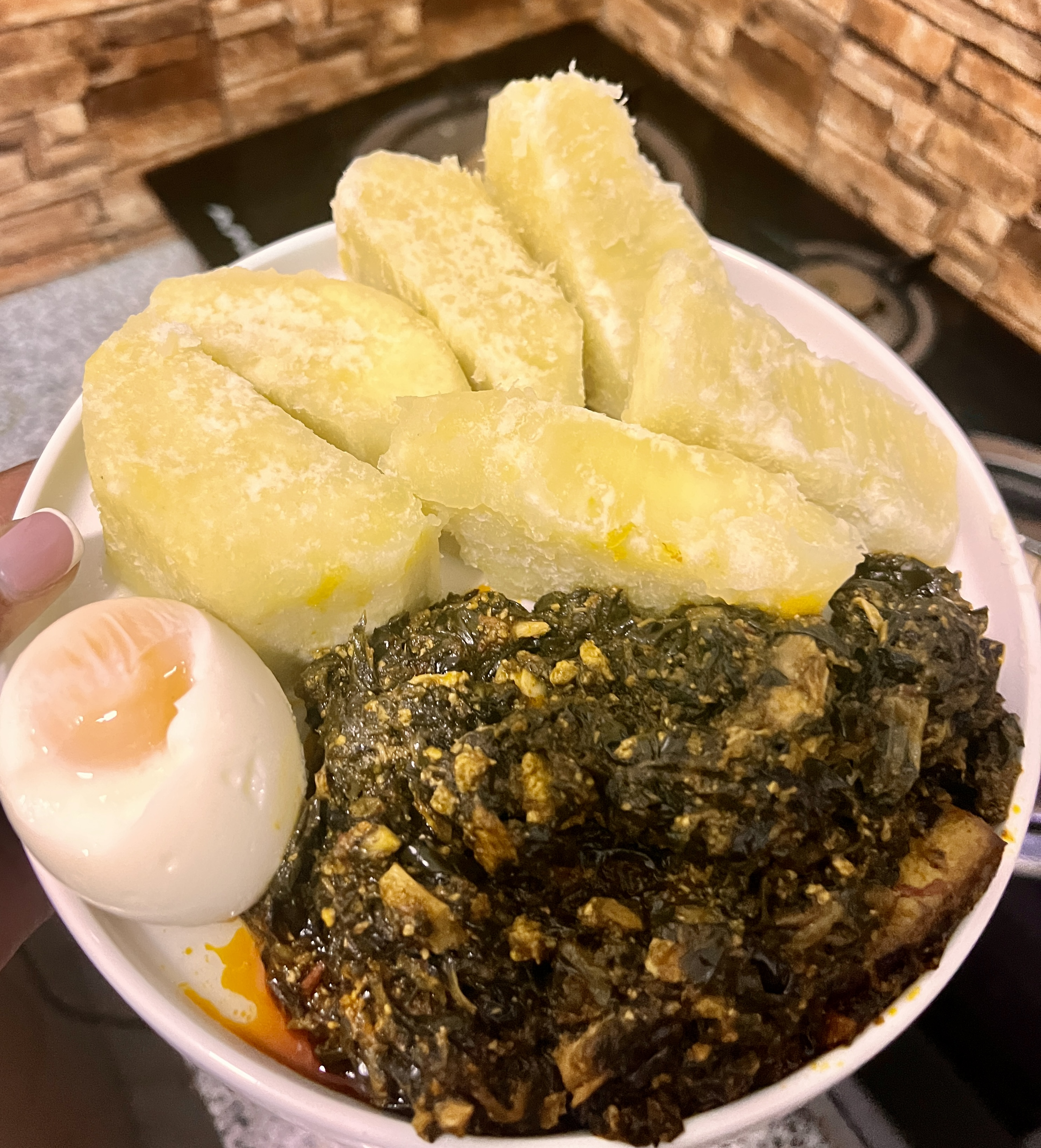

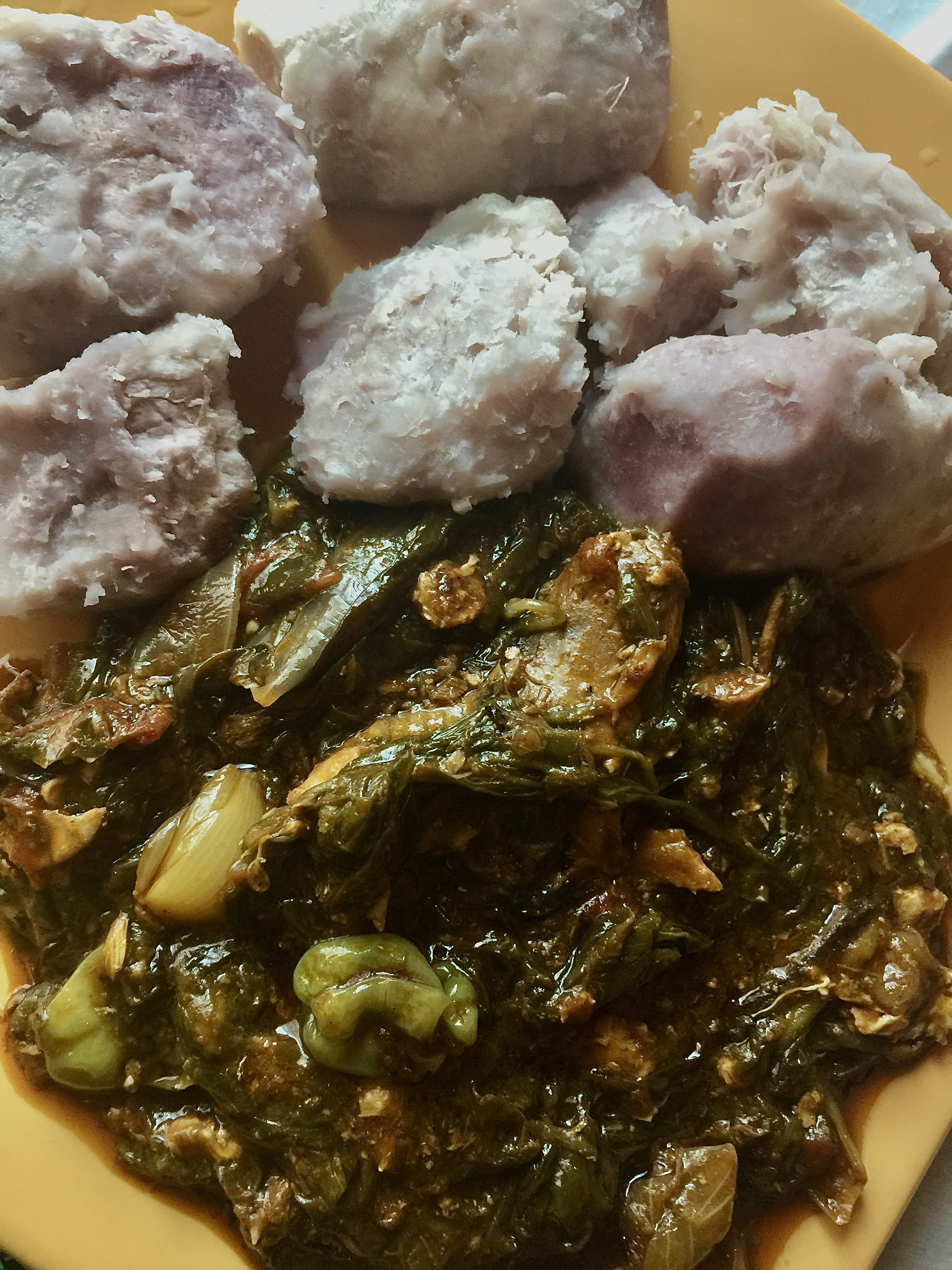
