= Gambian cuisine =

Culinary tradition

Location of The Gambia

Gambian cuisine mainly consists of Mandinka, Wolof, Serer, and Jola food, similar to neighbouring Senegal. Gambian cuisine is part of West African cuisine and includes the culinary practices and traditions of the nation of The Gambia and the Senegambia region. Some dishes originated from other West African tribes, brought in by immigrants from those countries during the British colonial era - brought in by the British.

Common Gambian (or Senegambian) ingredients include fish, rice, peanuts, tomato, black-eyed peas, lemon, cassava, cabbage, potato, pumpkin, garden egg, lettuces, thiere (couscous), corn, findi, onion, chili, and various herbs. Oysters are eaten from the River Gambia, harvested by women.

== Dishes ==
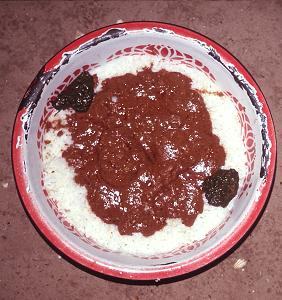
Domoda, most likely domoda farine

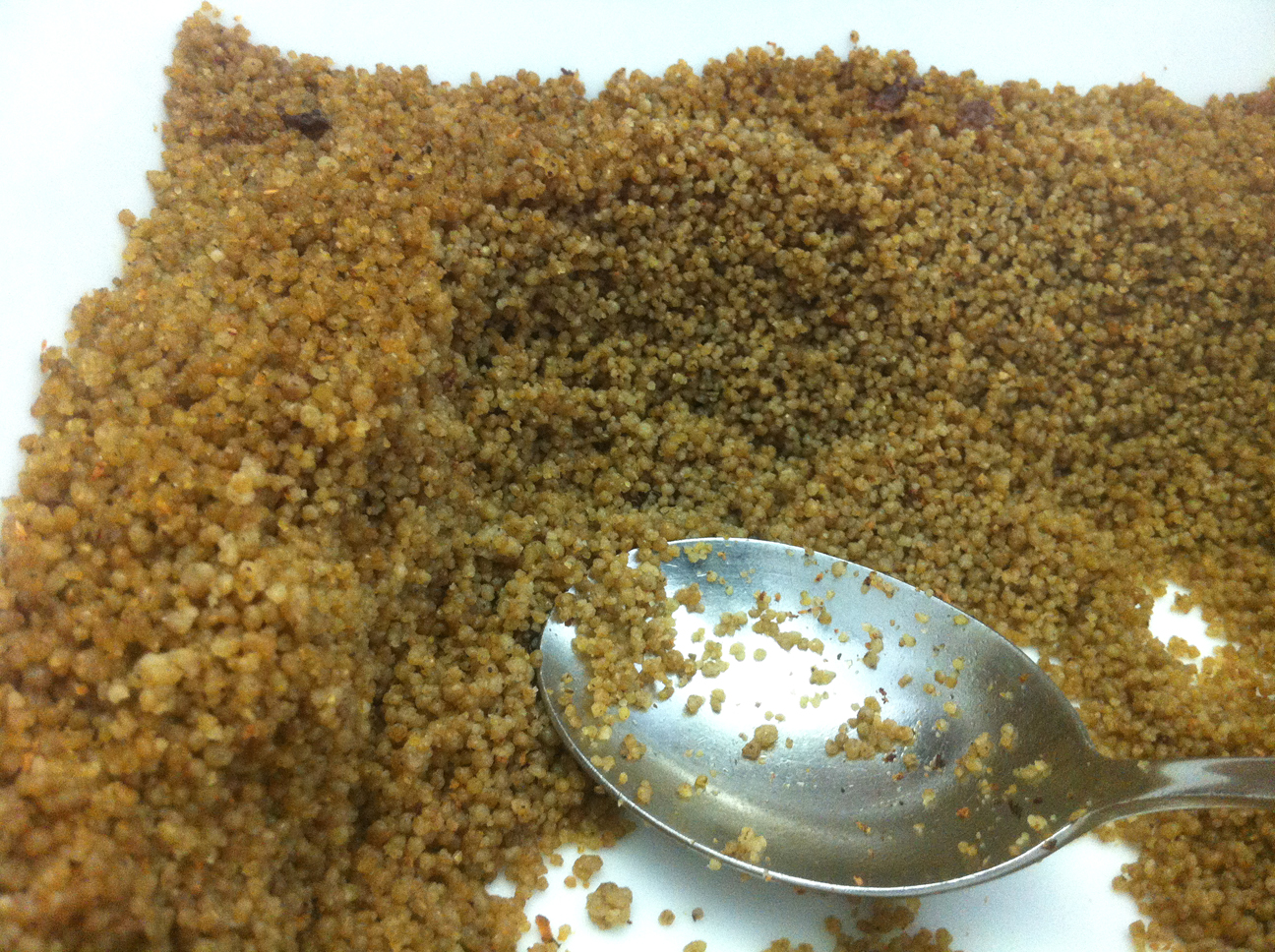
Grain used in cakri

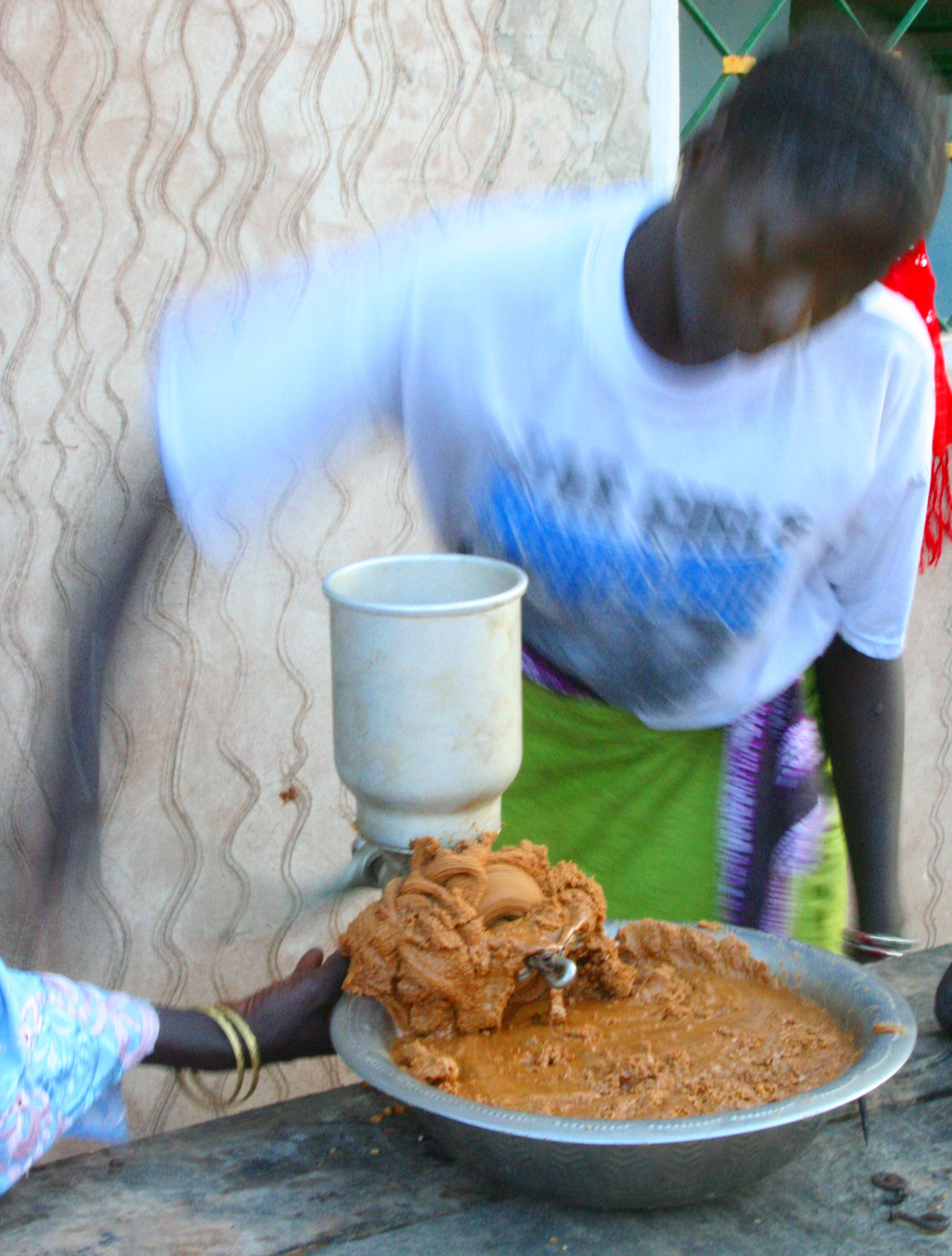
Gambian woman pasting peanuts in Farafenni

- Benachin (Wolof: benna cin, 'one pot'), a slightly different version of thieboudienne, (both names used in Senegal for the same dish), is an originally Wolof dish traditionally cooked in one pot (the practice giving it its name). Various ingredients including fish or meat are added, seasoned with herbs, lemon juice, basil, aubergine, parsley, onion, chili, tomato, pumpkin, carrot, cabbage, cassava, pepper, garden egg, dry fish, and vegetable oil, with tomato paste sometimes added for color.
- Caldo (Serer: kaldo ), a Serer dish, is a lemon-flavored steamed whole-fish dish, a variation of yassa.
- Domoda, (Mandinka: Domo dàa, 'eat pot'), a dish made with concentrated peanut paste, meat or fish seasoned with salt, medium onion, fresh tomatoes, potatoes, carrots, medium cabbage, water, tomato paste, lemon juice, soup stock, and white rice. Domoda is the national dish of the Gambia.
- Wolof: Mbaxal, Serer: Mbahal or Mandinka: nyankatang, a smoked and salted fish dish prepared with groundnuts, locust bean or black-eyed beans, spring onion, fresh chilies, white rice, and bitter tomato or jaatoo. There is also a version called Mahal-i Saluum (translation: Mbahal of Saloum).
- Nyambeh nyebbeh, a cassava and bean dish made with oils, onion, chili, soup stock, salt, pepper, and fried snapper.
- Pity pois or Petit pois, a stew made from green beans normally served with tapalapa or meat.
- Peppersoup, a spicy fish stew.
- Yassa, a lemon whole-chicken or fish dish made with salt, pepper, onion, clove, garlic, mustard, chili sauce, lime juice, rice and water (if making it with chicken). Jolas eat this dish.
- Oyster stew or sauci yohus, is a stew of oysters (or mussels) with vegetables such as peppers, tomatoes and onions and seasonings such as chili, ginger, garlic, bay leaves and other herbs. Serers eat this dish.
- Chere, a dish of steamed millet that can be served with various sauces, such as sauce made from okra and leafy plant like spinach for Chere mbuum, peanut sauce for Chere baasi gerte, tomato/peanut sauce for Chere baasi, meat, tomato & vegetable sauce for Chere baasi salte, and Chere Faas.
- Saadj, Saadj is a complex and time consuming dish, and one of the old traditional Serer dishes. The Serer are usually responsible for the planting and growing of the millet - all the way to the preparation of the dish into saadj/chere usually done by Serer women. Dues to its complexity and time-consuming nature, Serer women tend to sell it ready-made on Senegambian streets or markets. Saadj/chere is more versatile and more flavourful than Moroccan couscous, and can be eaten like a cereal or savory dish. It is one of the oldest and renowned Serer dishes - that was and still is prepared in Serer religious festivals like the Xooy, especially on the last day of the Xooy Holy Ceremony.
- Ngourbane, a Serer dish in origin made from grounded peanuts and millet, and sometimes served with meat and/or dried fish, with plenty of lemon and pepper. The dish is spicy and tangy and is one of the old Serer traditional dishes cooked during the rainy season, and for those suffering from cold or flu. The dish is found throughout the Senegambia region.
- Chew i kong is a fish stew with catfish, cooked with palm oil and served with rice.
- Chew yappa is a stew that is typically made with beef, but fish can also be used. This is also served with rice.
- Supakanja or superkanja is an okra stew or soup made with palm oil that may also contain smoked fish and beef, and is served with rice or fufu. Possibly of Ghanaian origin.
- Plasas, a stew/soup dish that appears similar to supakanja, but is made with spinach or potato leaves.
- Pem Bem, a fish dish served on rice, with cooked onions. Serers eat this dish.
- Kucha, a sour fish dish cooked with hibiscus leaf. It is made with fish, hibiscus leaf, okra, locust bean, tomatoes, onion, hot pepper, mixed spices, salt, lime and vinegar. Serers eat this dish.
- Fouti or Futti is an okra paste and various vegetables on rice. Fulas eat this dish.
- Domoda faring is a variation of the original Domoda but is made with flour instead of peanut butter. It is a tomato and vegetable lemony stew with chicken, lamb, beef or fishballs and uses flour to thicken the sauce.
- Fishball stew, also known as Chu Bullet in The Gambia, is a meal made of a fishballs paired with a sautéed onion sauce and rice.
- Chew diw tirr has smoked catfish as its main flavor, and includes vegetables including tomatoes, onions, okra, cabbage, cassava and eggplant and flavorings like garlic, hot peppers, and seasoning cubes.
- Moi moi or Oleleh, a boiled "pastry" of sorts with vegetables, meat, seafood, seasoning, with a bean base. Possibly of Nigerian origin.

== Beverages ==
- Attaya, a sweet green tea triple-brewed with a small kettle on an African charcoal pot, adding more sugar and pouring the tea from each cutting tea glass to another with each brew.
- Mandinka: Wonjo or Wolof: bisaab, a sweet drink made from steeping the roselle fruit, and adding sugar and mint. It is usually served cold.
- Bouyi or baobab juice (Serer: mbudaay-baak, 'boabab tree' ), a drink made from the baobab fruit, milk, and sugar. Usually served cold or at room temperature; however, when frozen, it becomes known as "ice", and is typically sold on streets or next to buses.
- JulBrew, formerly the only beer produced in The Gambia, which is no longer produced. Its role has been replaced by Goldfinch beer.
- Ginger juice, a strong ginger drink made from ginger, sugar, and vanilla.
- Kabaa juice, a sour-sweet juice made from crushing the pulp of the Saba senegalensis fruit, and adding sugar and water.
- Ditakh juice, a drink made from removing the shell and soaking the Detarium senegalense fruit, then adding sugar.
- Palm wine, made from the sap of various palm trees.
- Tamarind juice (or 'dahaar' in Serer and Wolof), a sweet drink made with tamarind, sugar, lime juice, and cloves.
- Kinkeliba, Sekhaw, or Douté is a strong tea made from Combretum micranthum leaves.
- Wolof: Mbor Mbor, or Mandinka: Sisiling-nyamo is a strong tea made from Lippia chevalieri or Lippia multiflora leaves.
- Serer: Yay (or nguuƭ), Wolof: Rat (or ratt), or Mandinka: Jambakatan kè is a strong tea made from Combretum glutinosum leaves. The Serer use it as a medicine and sometimes add sugar to reduce bitterness.

== Snacks, lunches, savoury breakfasts, and street foods ==
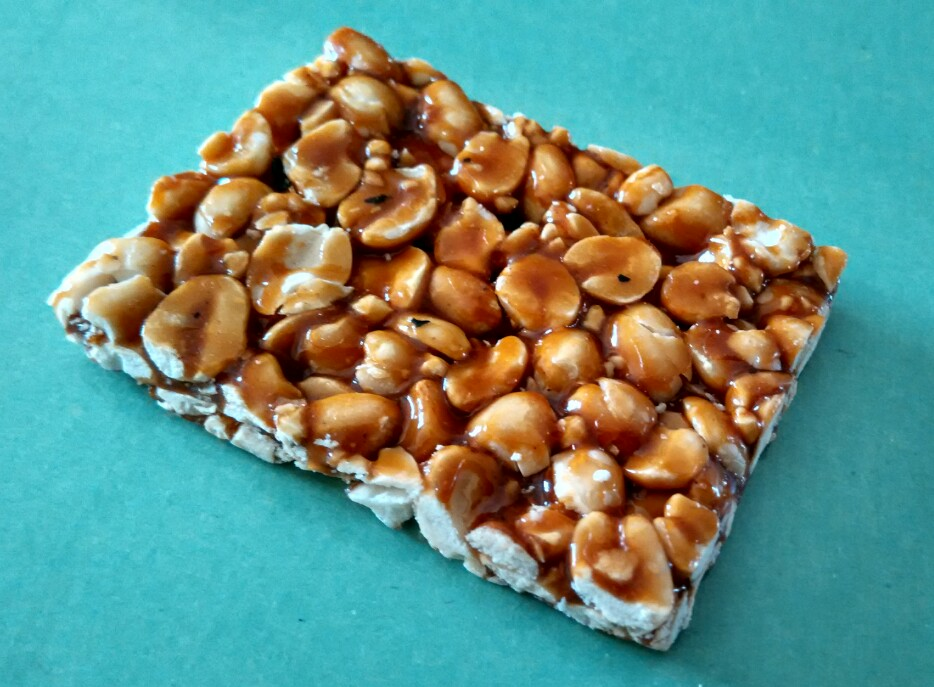
Caramelized disc groundnut cake

- Tapalapa is a bread shaped like a baguette, but more dense. It is made from wheat flour, millet flour, and black-eyed peas, in addition to water, salt, and yeast. The bread is baked in a tapalapa oven and is usually stuffed with things such as nyebbeh (black-eyed peas), fish, boiled egg, fried egg, mayonnaise, potato, sukula (chocolate paste), and others.
- Senfuur, a more traditional French baguette bread, usually stuffed with the same things as tapalapa.
- Sweet bread, a small bread that looks like a large brioche bun. Its interior is soft and is usually stuffed with the same fillings as tapalapa.
- 'Grumsoup' (or Grone soup), a spicy and tangy smoked herring fish dish made with plenty of onions, lemon/lime juice, pepper, and some sea salt. Aku, Creole people eat this dish.
- Fish balls are made with ground bonga, onion, tomato, breadcrumbs, parsley, black pepper, oil, soup stock, tomato paste, chilis and white rice.
- Akara, are West African deep-fried fritters made from ground black-eyed peas seasoned with salt, pepper, and onion. They are often eaten for breakfast with tapalapa.
- Afra or dibi is a common street food made from grilled meat cubes seasoned with salt, black pepper, cayenne pepper, and bouillon cubes.
- Fufu are balls made from flour from plantain, yam, potato or cassava. They can be served in layers with various dishes, such as supakanja.
- Panket are roughly racquetball-sized deep-fried balls made out of sugar, water, baking powder, and millet flour for panketu dougub, or wheat flour for panketu fanrin. It is an old Senegambian dish usually served during the naming ceremony of a newly born baby. It is called by different names in West Africa.
- Street yassa, not to be confused with yassa, is a fish and onion dish made out of bonga, onions, hot pepper, salt, tamarind, and lemon. Jola people eat this dish and is the precursor to the yassa served in the home with rice.
- Fish ket are flat fried discs made out of flour, salt, and water. They are almost always topped with grone soup (marinated smoked fish), or a bean sauce with stir-fried onions.
- Meat pie, meat-stuffed pastry similar to Jamaican patties.
- Ebbeh is a spicy soup with seafood such as crab.
- Unripe mango with spices and sugar is often eaten as a quick street snack.
- Groundnuts, usually sold salted and roasted with the skin on.
- Groundnut cake, groundnuts with a thick ginger and sugar coating,
- Groundnut cake disc, groundnuts shaped into a flat disc by hardened caramelised sugar.
- Bissap sauce
- Kabaa, not referring to the drink, but instead to kabaa flesh in a cup, seasoned with sugar and spices.
- Roasted corn, corn cobs roasted usually until there is little to no moisture left.
- Chopati or chin chin.

== Desserts and sweet breakfasts ==
- Chakery, a sweet dish made from couscous (wheat or millet), milk (or sweetened condensed milk or yogurt), fruit and spices.
- Lakh (Wolof: lax, 'milk') is a sweet porridge made from the baobab fruit and millet. It can be optionally topped with njineh jobe or ndine diop, a sweet, peanut-based sauce also made with baobab and nutmeg. Serers eat this dish, served in Serer religious festivals, especially in the morning and sometimes even in the afternoon. Historically, before the advent of modern sugar grains or cubes, the Serer would use honey and baobab juice or honey and fermented milk to give it flavour.
- Churai guerrteh or chura gherteh A dish made of grounded peanuts (guerteh). Serer eat this dish.
- Mono, a millet flour porridge.
- Nan mbuur or naani mburu, A sweet baobab based porridge.
- Latchiri a Fula dish made from millet, corn or couscous often served with yogurt or milk.
- Arraw pap, rui, or carraw, a porridge. A dish similar to lakh (above). Serer eat this dish.

== Gallery ==
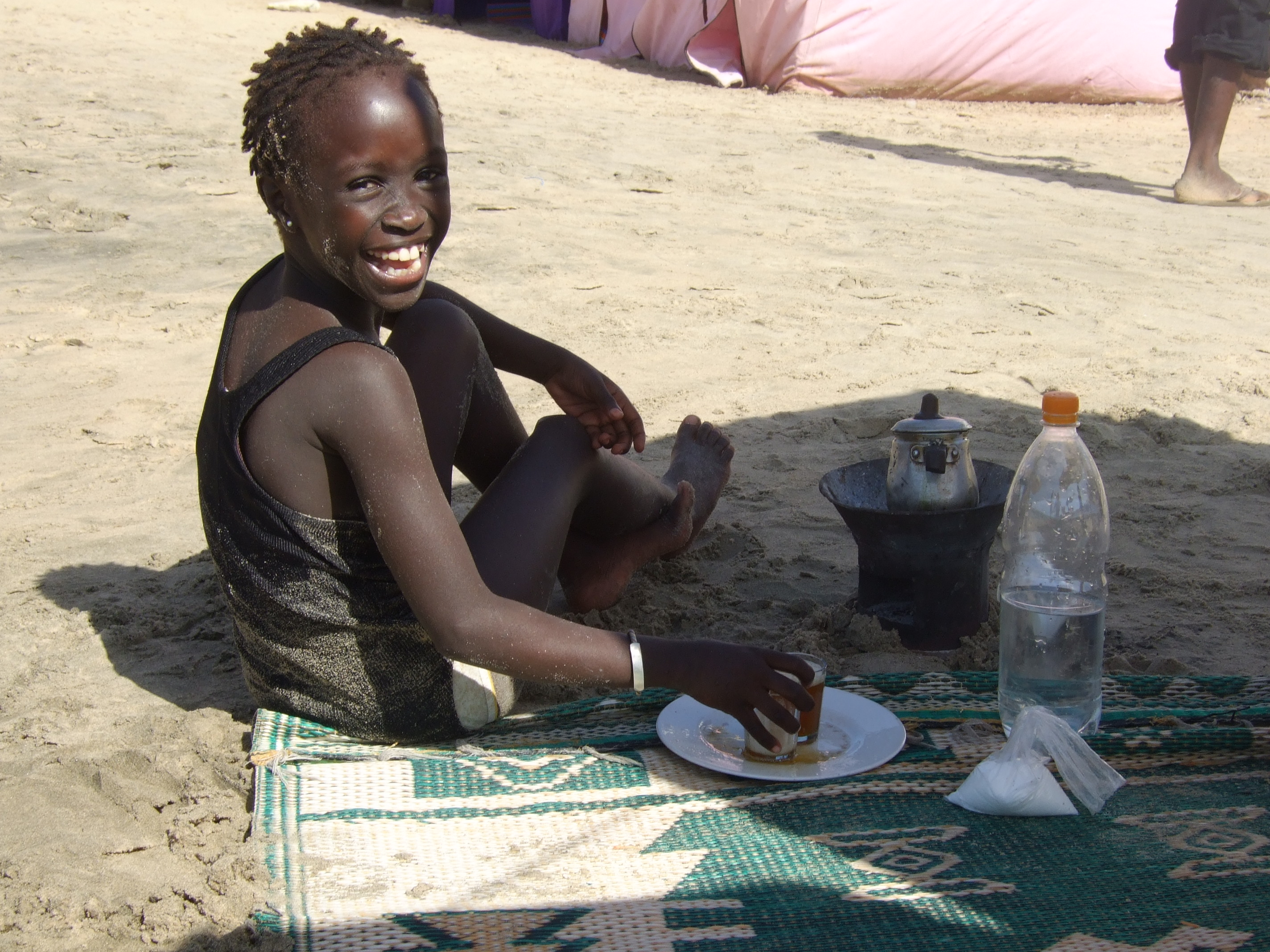
Gambian child making attaya

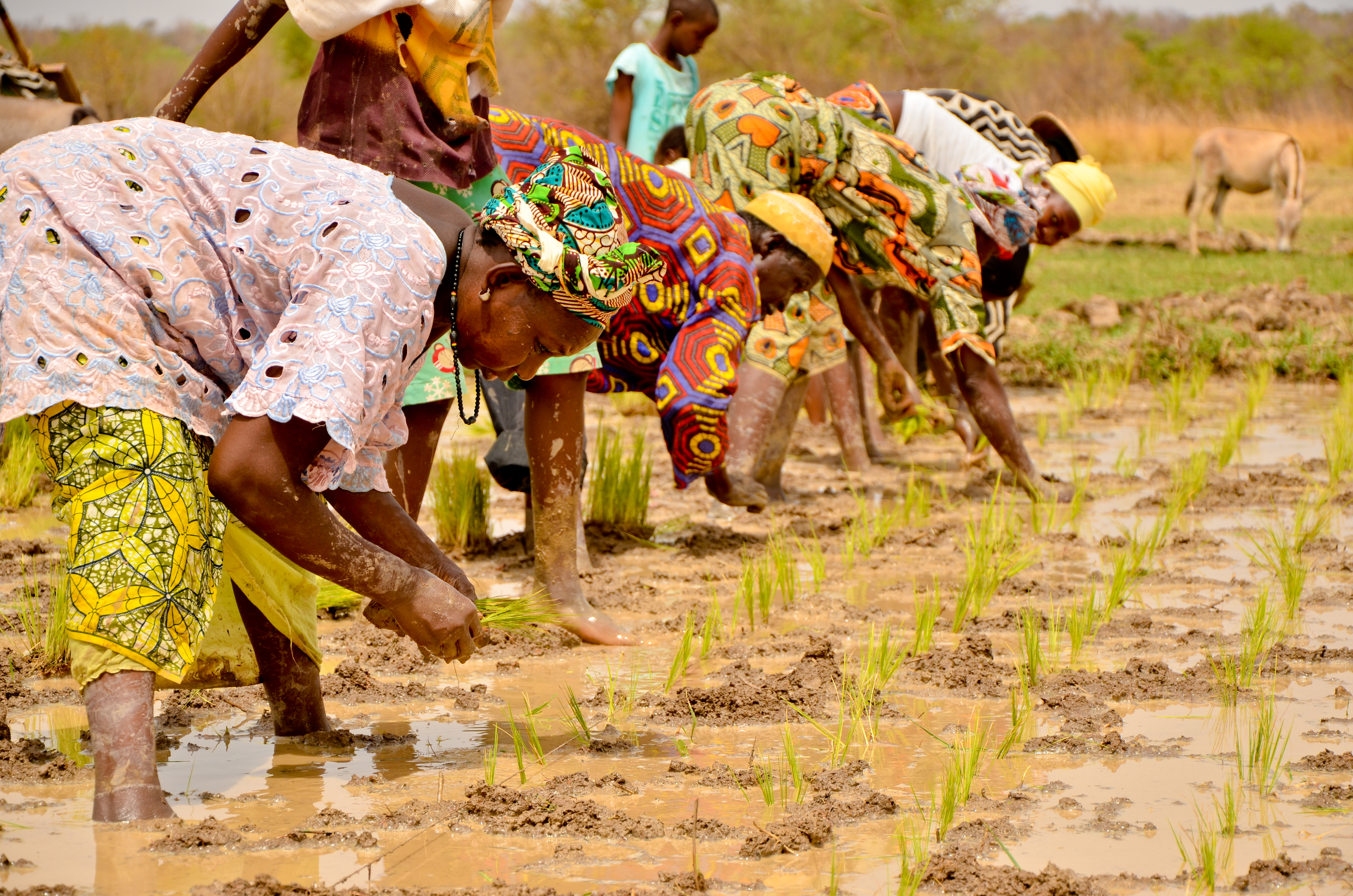
Gambian women harvesting rice

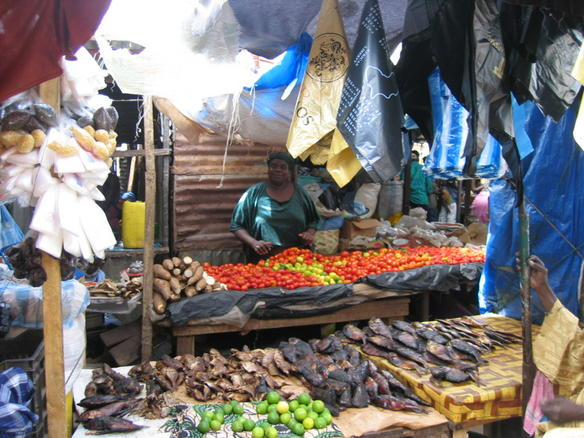
Gambian lady's stall in a market

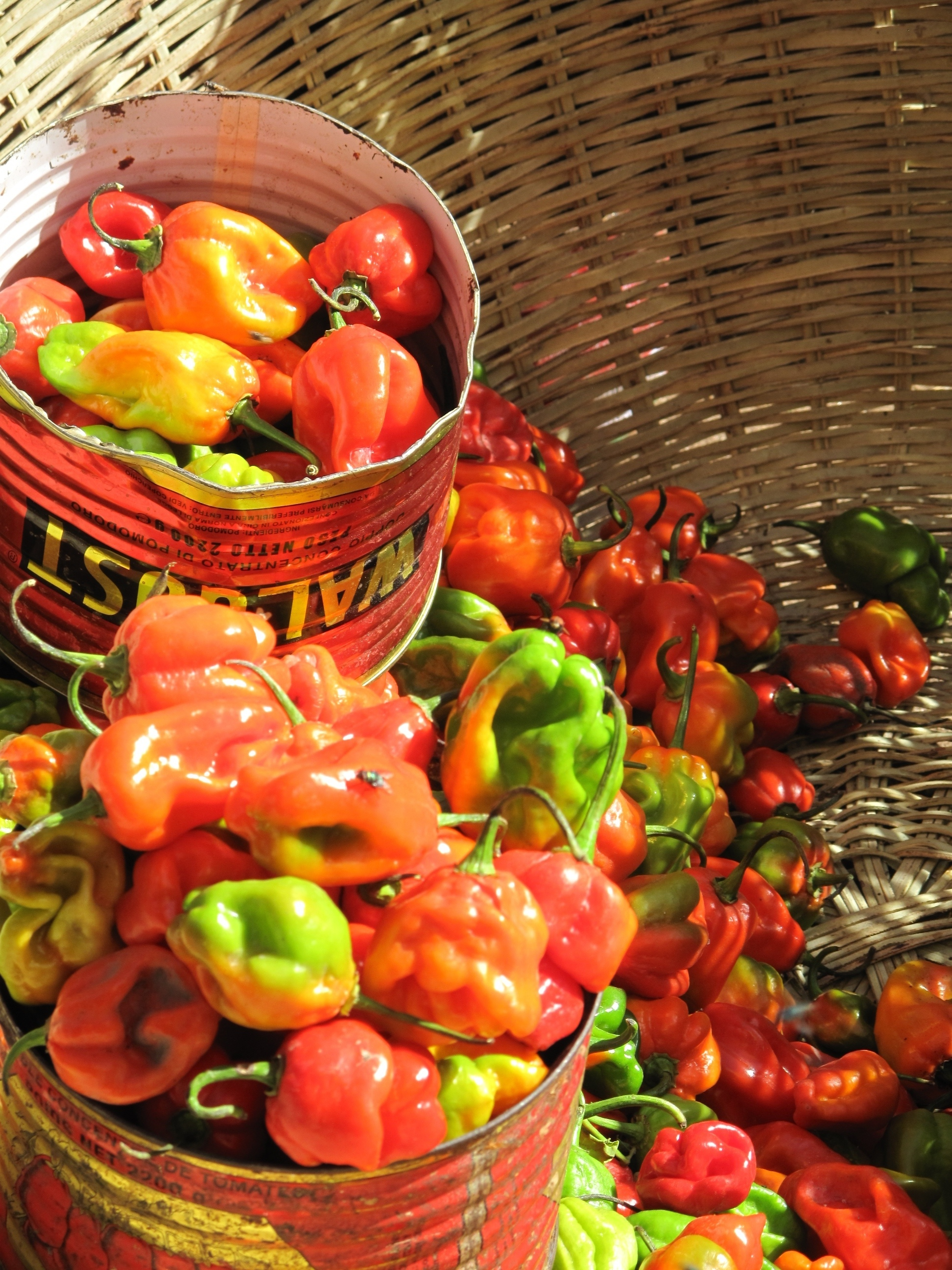
Scotch bonnets in Serrekunda market

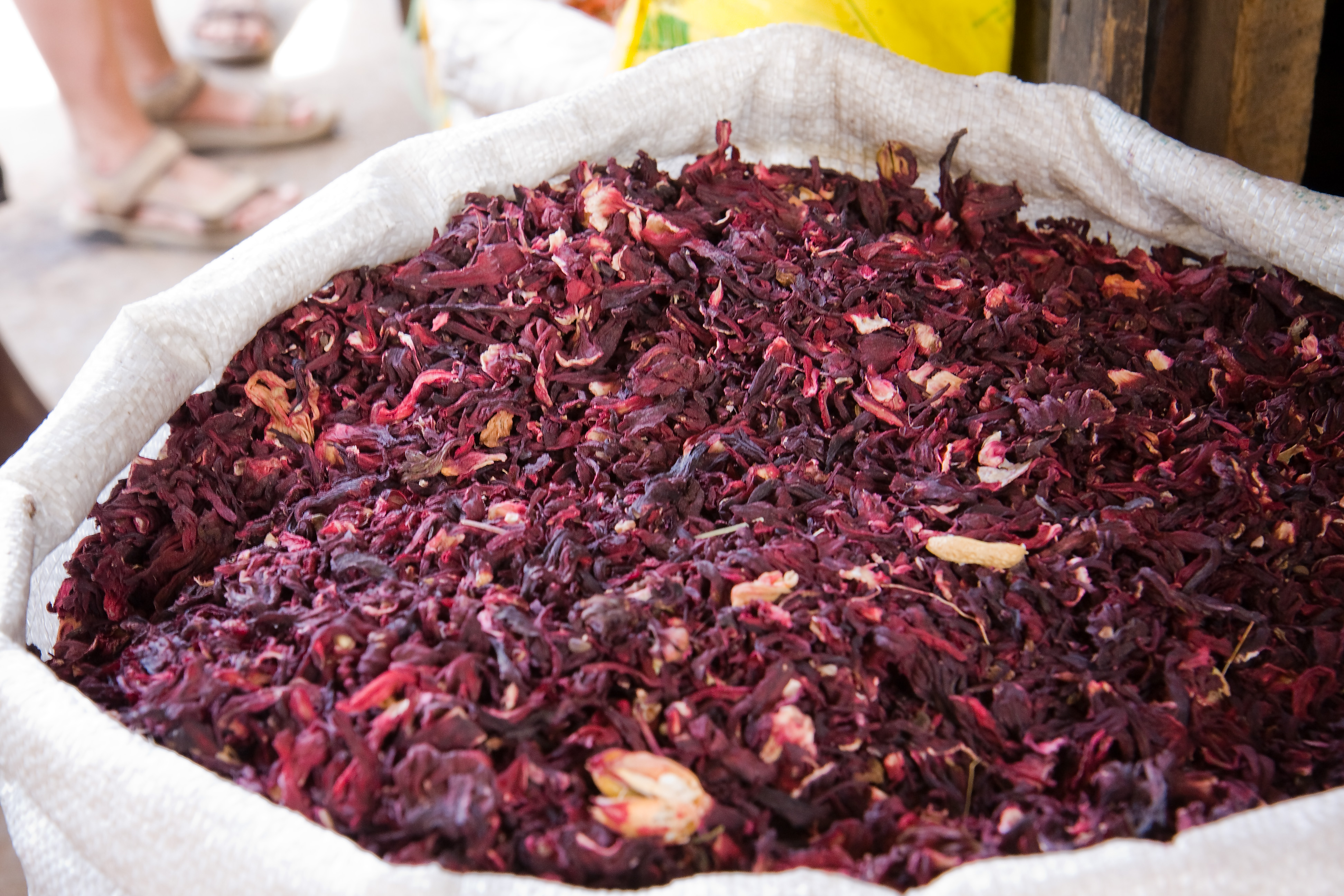
Big bag of dried wonjo fruit

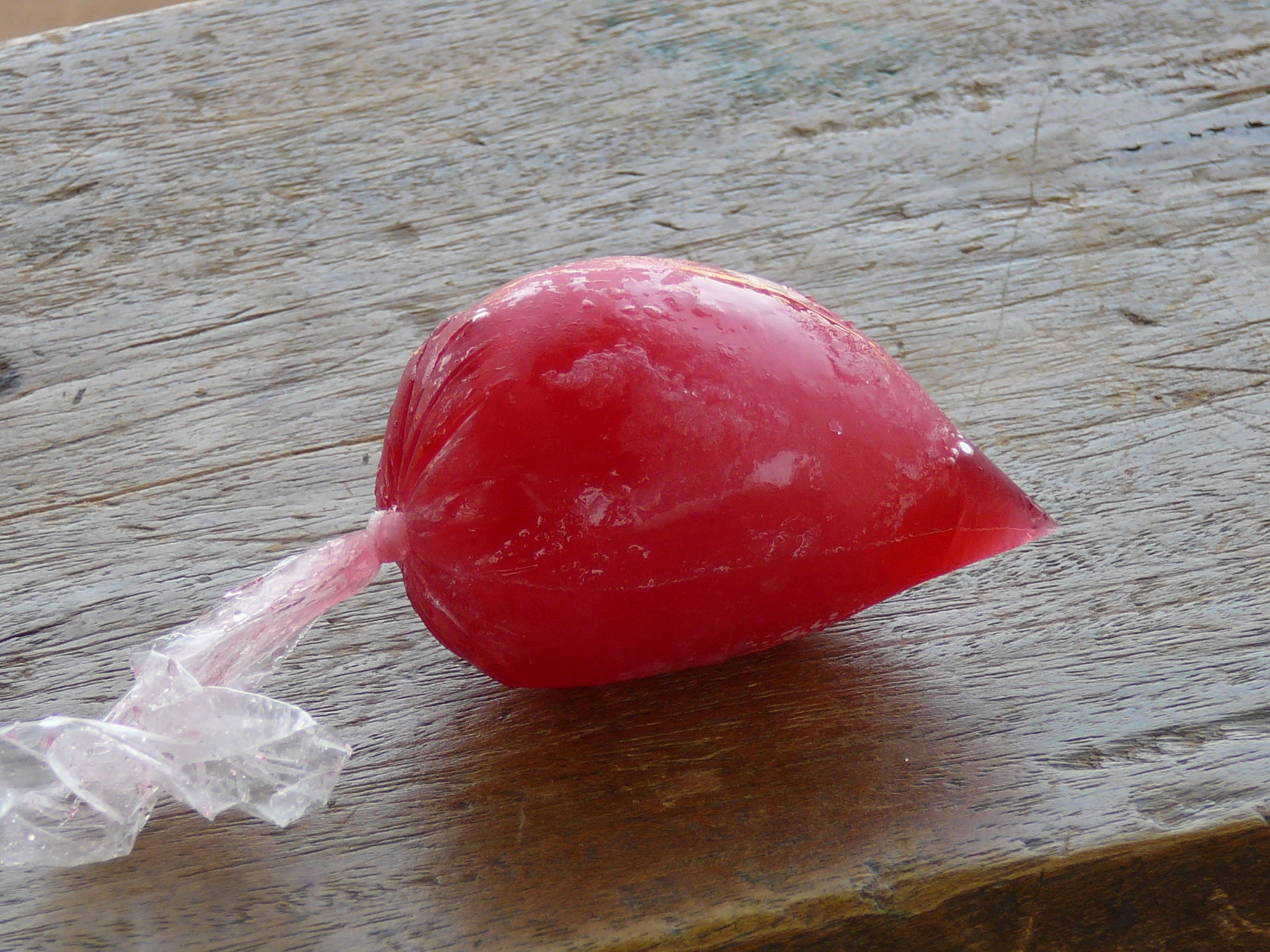
Frozen wonjo juice

== See also ==
- Senegalese cuisine
- List of African cuisines
- Guinean cuisine
