= Malian cuisine =

Culinary traditions of Mali

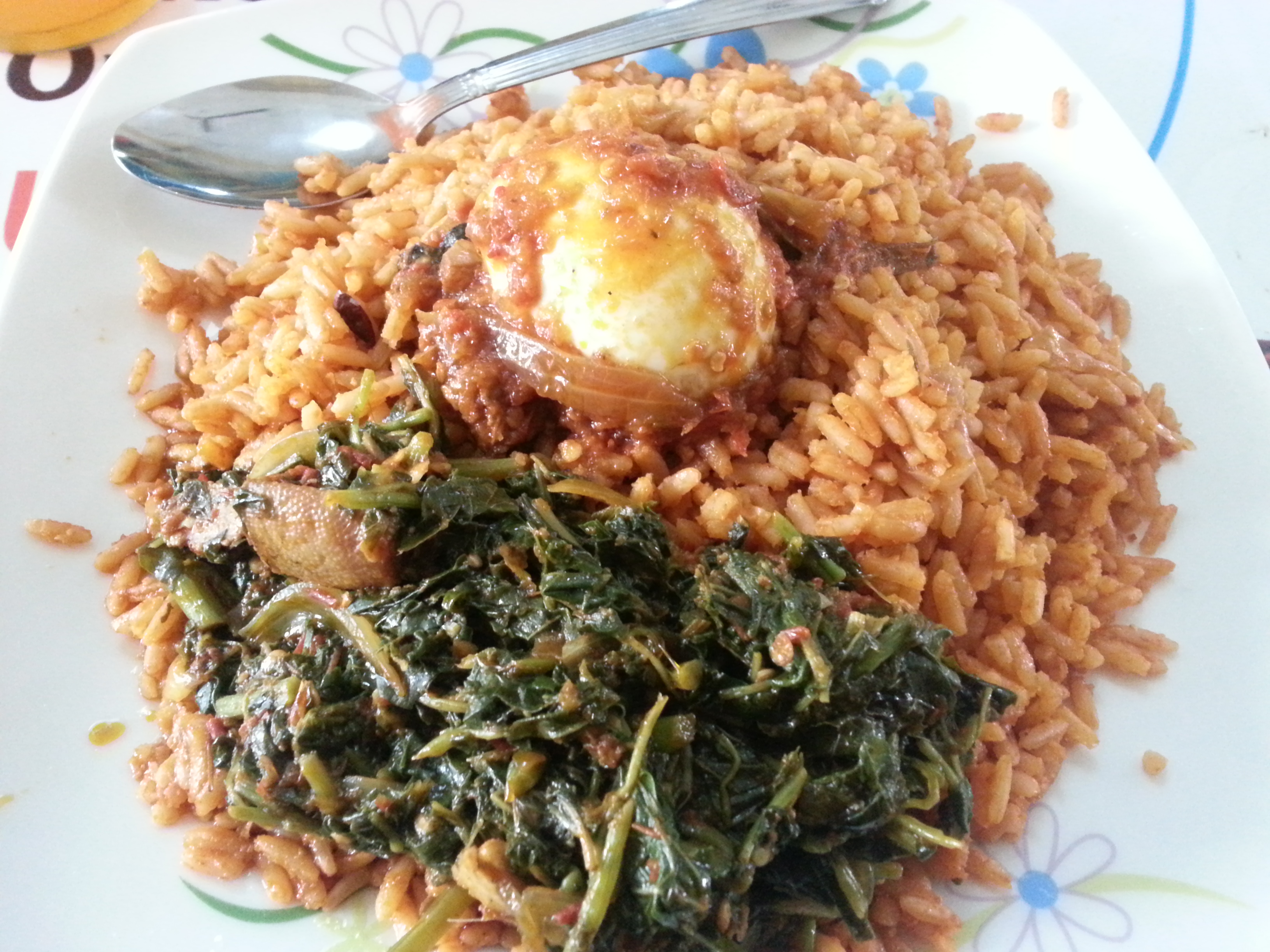
Jollof rice with vegetables and a boiled egg

Cuisine in Mali includes rice and millet as staples of Mali, a food culture heavily based on cereal grains. Grains are generally prepared with sauces made from edible leaves, such as spinach, sweet potato or baobab, with tomato peanut sauce. The dishes may be accompanied by pieces of grilled meat (typically chicken, mutton, beef, or goat).

Malian cuisine varies regionally. Part of West African cuisine, other popular dishes in Mali include fufu, Dibi, Jollof rice, and maafe (peanut butter sauce). The National dish is Tiguadege Na, a creamy peanut stew with various meats like beef, chicken or meatballs.

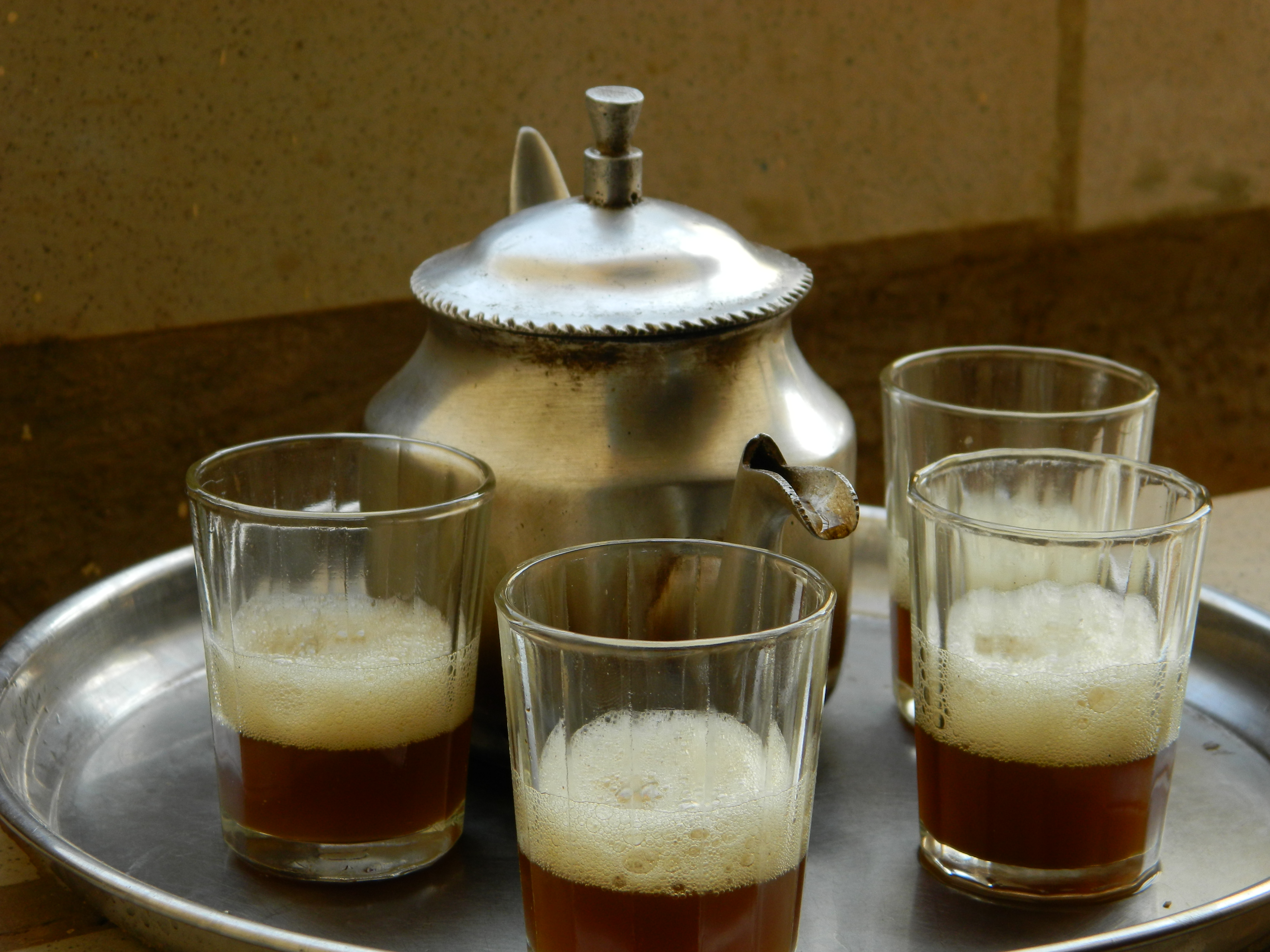
Malian tea

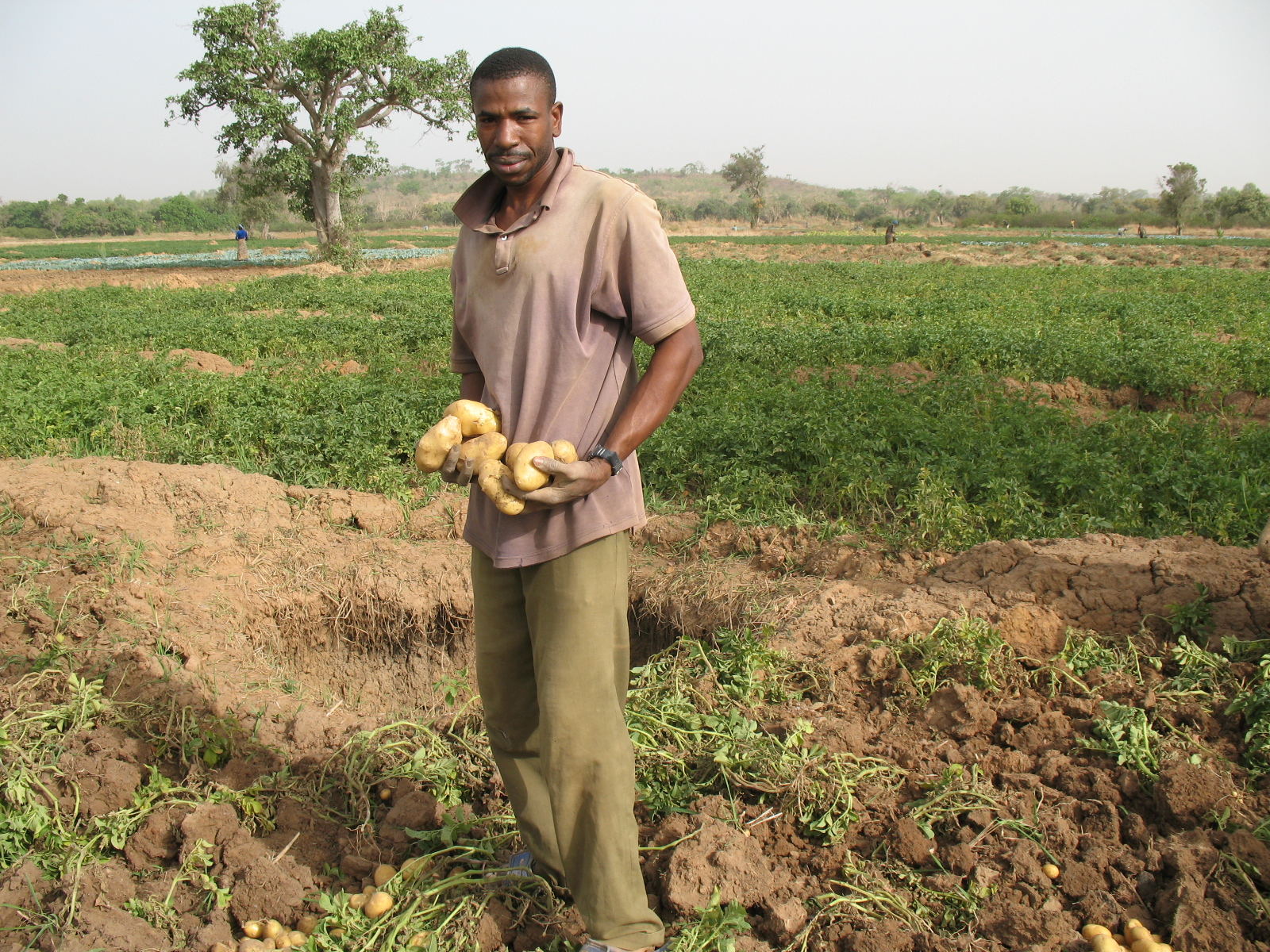
A farmer with potatoes

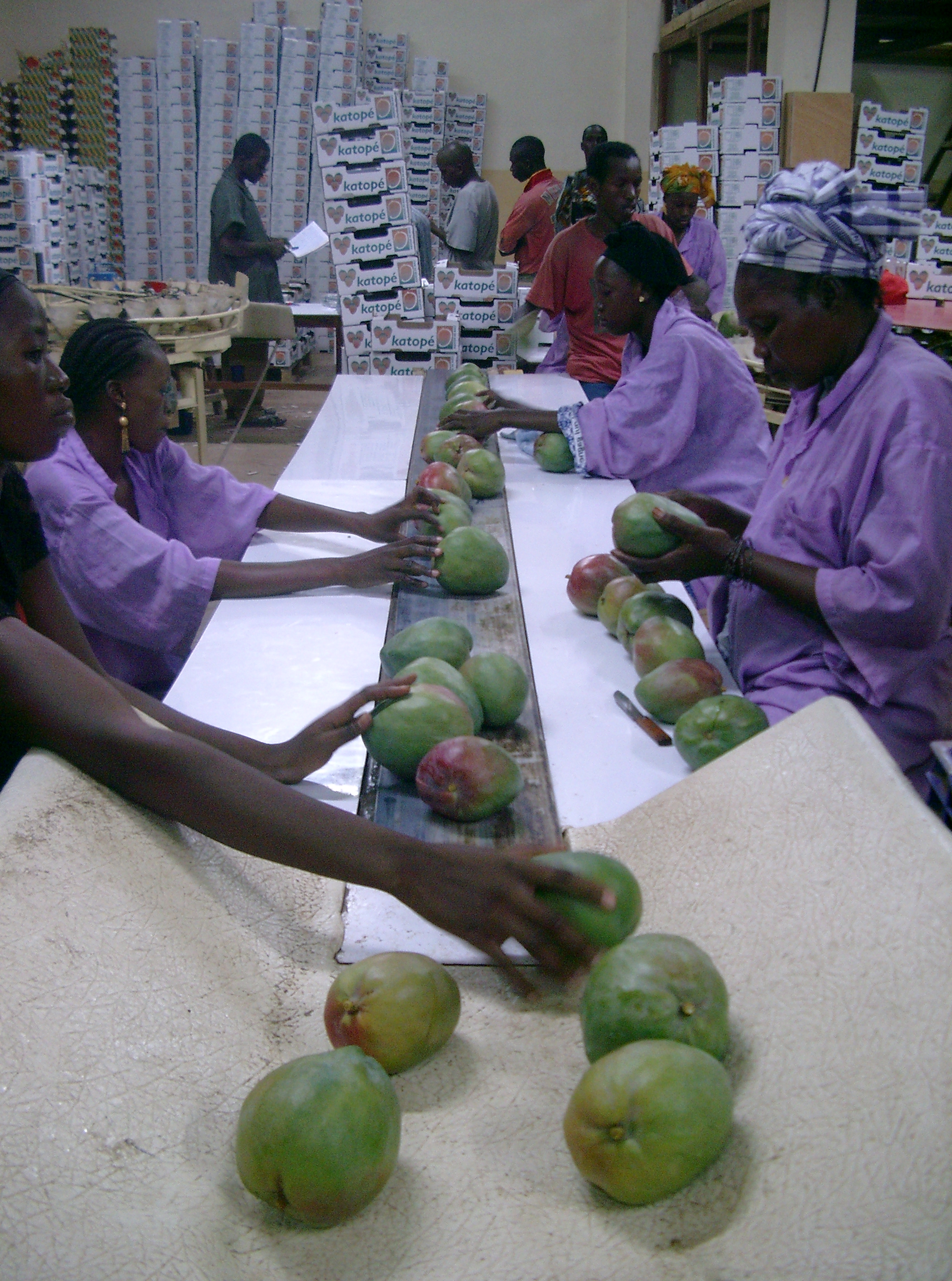
Mango packaging

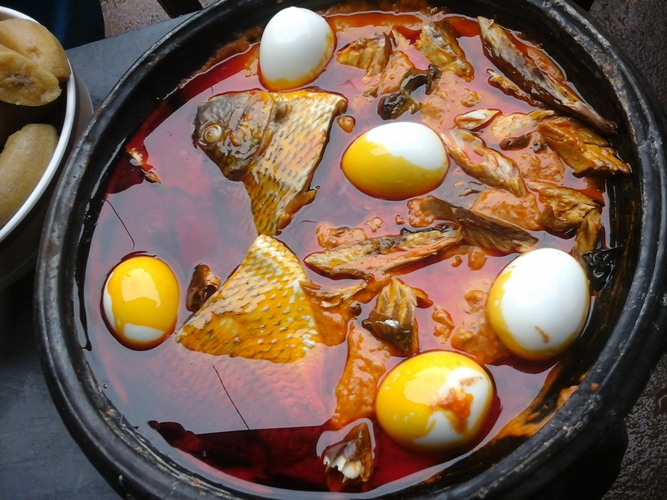
Groundnut stew

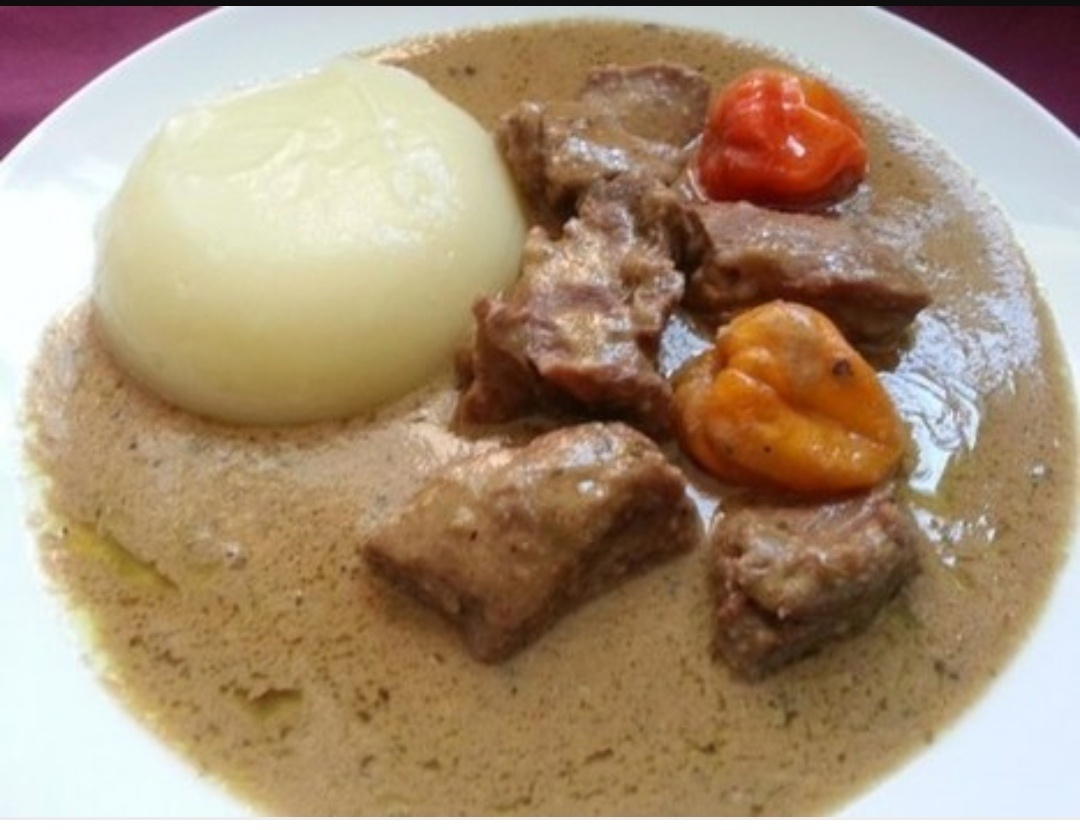
Another image depicting groundnut stew

== Breakfast ==
Common Malian breakfasts usually consist of Millet-based porridges, various breads, and sweet and sugary teas. Common morning staples include:

- Fonde/monoo: a Malian millet porridge that is also commonly eaten in Senegal.
- Maasa: traditional deep-fried pancakes or flatbread made with rice or millet.
- Malian bread: Breads like baguette are commonly eaten in Mali with butter or cheese.

== Lunch ==
Lunch in Mali is considered the most substantial meal, people usually eat traditional curries(sauces) made with peanuts, okra or baobab leaves. Other dishes like Yassa are also popular in this region. Some common staples for lunch in Mali are:

- Tigadeguena/Domoda: a creamy peanut stew made with various meats.
- Rice and meat is also popular. Along with applesauce, cheese, and peas

== Miscellanous ==
- Foutou: porridge made with cassava
- Salade à la Tomate et au Concombres: a traditional tomato and cucumber salad.
- Poulet Kedjennou: a chicken stew that is eaten with vegetables
- Poulet Yassa: a famous Senegalese dish that is also very commonly eaten in parts and regions of Mali, it consists of many different things like lemon, onion and more.
- Diabadji: Meat in onion sauce
- Fakoye: Lamb in herb sauce
- Naboulou: Meat and baobab leaves in peanut sauce
- N’gougouna: Meat in bean leaf sauce
- Saga Saga: Meat in sweet potato leaf sauce
- Sauce d’Arachide: Meat in peanut sauce
- Sauce Noire: Meat in gumbo sauce
- Mango: tropical fruit grown across the world, and is very popular in Mali.

== Bibliography ==
- Milet, Eric & Manaud, Jean-Luc (2007). Mali (in French). Editions Olizane. ISBN 978-2-88086-351-7.
- Velton, Ross (2004). Mali. Bradt Travel Guides. ISBN 978-1-84162-077-0.
