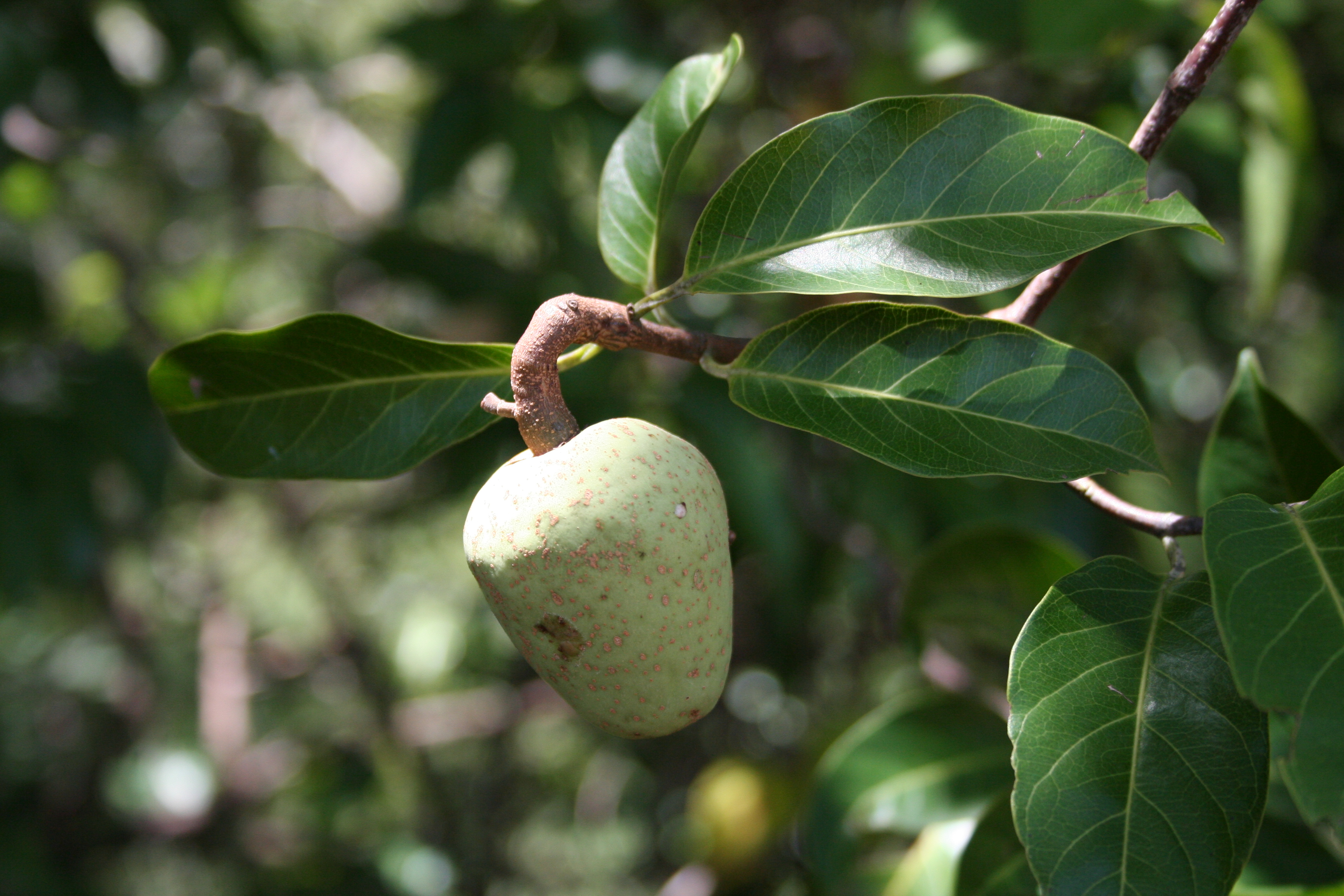
- Saba senegalensis

Scientific classification
- Kingdom: Plantae
- Clade: Tracheophytes
- Clade: Angiosperms
- Clade: Eudicots
- Clade: Asterids
- Order: Gentianales
- Family: Apocynaceae
- Subfamily: Rauvolfioideae
- Tribe: Willughbeieae
- Subtribe: Landolphiinae
- Genus: Saba (Pichon) Pichon

= Saba (plant) =

Genus of plants

Saba is a genus of plant in the family Apocynaceae first described as a genus in 1849. It is native to Madagascar, Comoros, and mainland Africa.

Species

- Saba comorensis (Bojer ex A.DC.) Pichon - Madagascar, Comoros, Africa from Senegal to Somalia and south to Zimbabwe
- Saba senegalensis (A.DC.) Pichon - Sahel from Senegal to Central African Republic
- Saba thompsonii (A.Chev.) Pichon - W Africa (Benin, Togo, Burkina Faso, Ghana, Ivory Coast, Nigeria)
