= Thiere =

Senegalese couscous dish

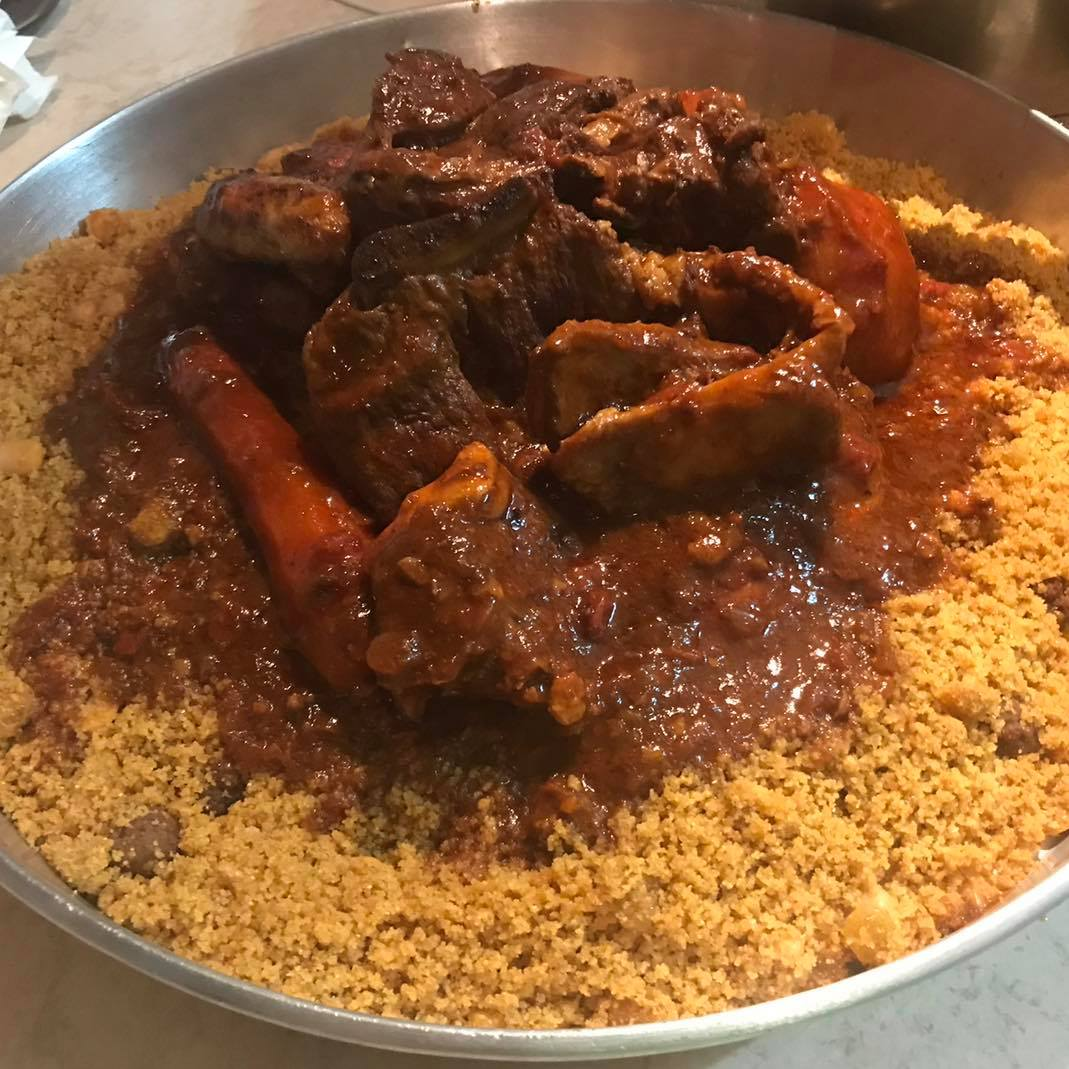
- Saadj/Thiere with lamb
- Alternative names: Saac, Saay, Futo, Lacciri, Basi
- Place of origin: Senegambia

Thiere or thiéré is a millet-based couscous and an important staple food in Senegal, The Gambia and Mauritania.

Thiere is very versatile and can be eaten with fermented milk or cream and sugar as a breakfast cereal or prepared just as a standard couscous. Although it can be eaten as a breakfast or at lunch, it is usually eaten at night. Historically the dish was prepared in a very labor-intensive way, with women pounding the millet by hand using a large traditional pestle and mortar and adding baobab leaf (laalo) to it to give it a smooth texture and enhance the taste. It can be eaten with base - a form of peanut stew - and/or with meat, fish, or vegetables.

== Name ==
Thiéré is a francophone spelling of the Wolof word cere, and can also be spelled chere / chereh / cherreh in The Gambia. In Serer it is called saadj, sadj or sat; with dialect variations by other Serer groups e.g. saac amongst the Serer Niominka) or saay amongst the Serer-Saafi and other Serer Cangin peoples. Other names include lacciri in Fula, futo in Soninke, futu in Mandinka, basi in Bambara, ngemu or kuskus in Hassaniya Arabic, and oufti in Zenaga.

== History ==
A dish resembling thiere may have been consumed by the members of the Tichitt culture, dated to 700-400 BCE, where millet was grown and perhaps made into a couscous. Thiere was one of the main staple foods of the Senegambian region by at least the 15th century, when Europeans first arrived and left written records. It was eaten in the entire Senegal River valley from Waalo up to Gajaaga and Bambouk. Only in the 19th century did thiere begin to lose ground to thieboudienne, now Senegal's national dish.

Historically, saadj/thiere was produced by the Serer in the pre-colonial Serer Kingdoms of Sine, Baol, Saloum, and Tekrur as part of their normal dishes. The dish was also prepared on Serer religious ceremonial occasions such as the Gamo, Raan, and Xooy festivals, as well as during weddings, naming ceremonies, etc. Amongst the Serers' ancestors, the dish could be eaten in the morning as a breakfast cereal with fermented milk and honey or during the day or night as lunch or dinner served with vegetables, meat, or fish. It all depended on what they had available. With the advent of trade and globalisation - where more produce is easily available, the recipes used regardless of the time of the day has become richer and varied.

Amongst the Wolof and Fula, it is customary to consume it in the evenings as a dinner, weddings, or on special Islamic religious occasions such as Tamkharit (the Muslim new year, Ashura). Serer and Fula women from Futa Jallon are the main thiere sellers in street markets.

== Preparation ==
It is usually served with different variations of sauces such as bassi salté, bassi guerte or mboum. The sauce often includes vegetables, meat or chicken, and moringa leaves.
