= Tapalapa (bread) =

Traditional African bread

- Type: Bread
- Place of origin: Senegal
- Main ingredients: wheat flour, millet flour, yeast, salt, water

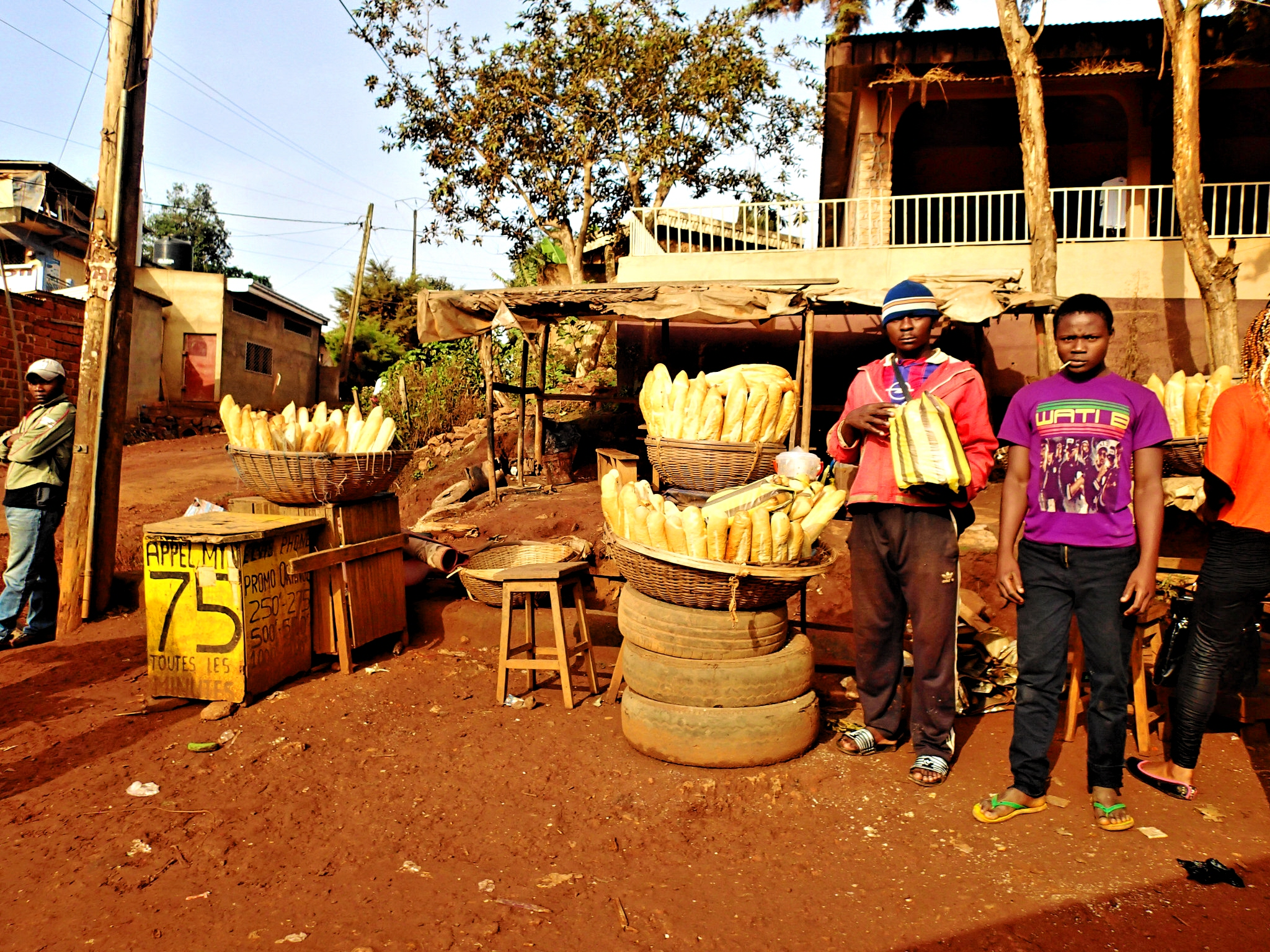
Vendors selling tapalapa bread in Dschang, Cameroon

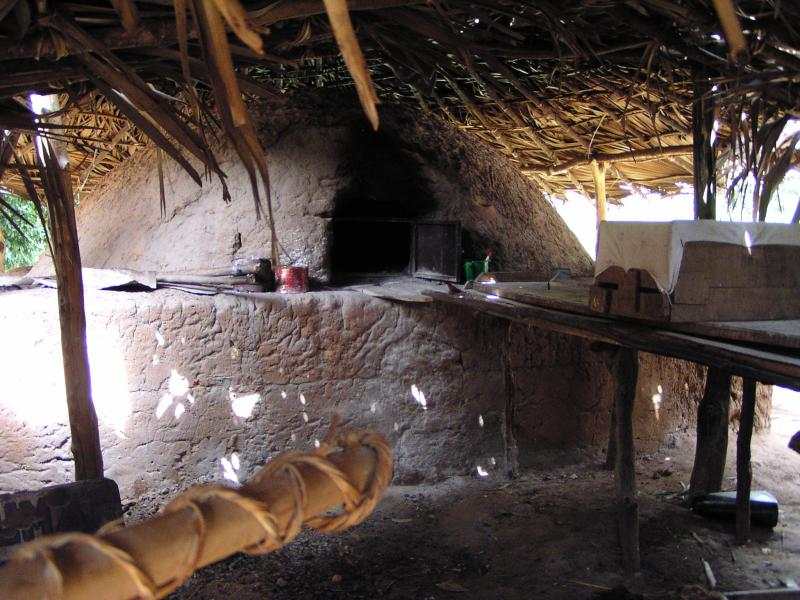
Tapalapa bread oven

Tapalapa is a traditional West African bread originating in Senegal based on the French baguette, though it is slightly smaller, and baked in a large, traditional wood-burning oven made of mud brick. Tapalapa is hard to find in large cities in Senegal, as these wood-burning ovens are illegal in cities over 10,000 inhabitants, but is common in smaller towns and villages. Tapalapa is mainly eaten in Senegal, Mauritania, Gambia and Guinea.

It is often eaten for breakfast with akara, beans, fish, eggs or other toppings. It is also eaten for lunch or dinner with other West African dishes such as peppersoup.

The main ingredients are flour (both wheat and millet are used), salt, water and yeast. The resulting bread is heavier and more filling than a typical baguette.

== See also ==
- List of African dishes
- List of African cuisines
- List of breads
- Cuisine of Gambia
- Cuisine of Senegal
- Cuisine of Guinea
