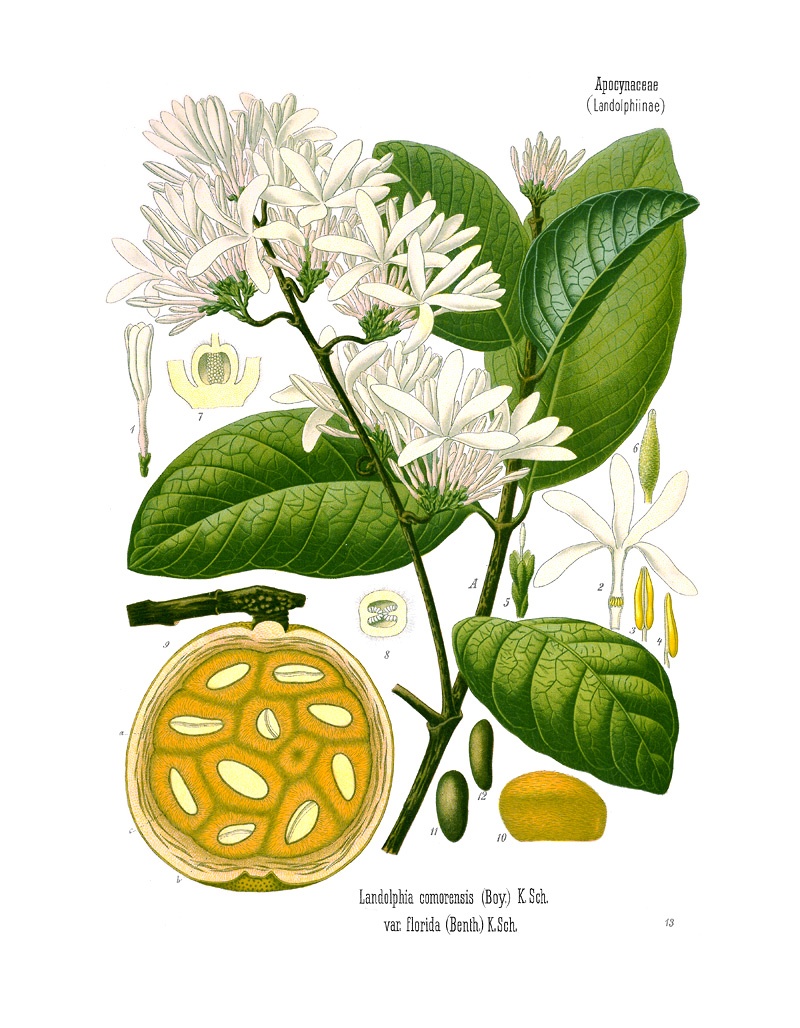
- Saba comorensis

Scientific classification
- Kingdom: Plantae
- Clade: Embryophytes
- Clade: Tracheophytes
- Clade: Angiosperms
- Clade: Eudicots
- Clade: Asterids
- Order: Gentianales
- Family: Apocynaceae
- Genus: Saba
- Species: S. comorensis

Binomial name
- Saba comorensis (Bojer ex A.DC.) Pichon

Synonyms
- Landolphia comorensis (Bojer ex A. DC.) K. Schum.

= Saba comorensis =

Species of flowering plant

Saba comorensis is a species of flowering plant in the Apocynaceae family. It is commonly called bungo fruit (pl. mabungo), mbungo, or rubber vine and is widespread across most of tropical Africa as well as in Madagascar and Comoros. The fruit looks similar to an orange with a hard orange peel but when opened it contains a dozen or so pips, which have the same texture as a mango seed. The fruit also makes a delicious juice drink which has been described as tasting "somewhere between a mango, an orange and a pineapple". The aromatic juice of the bungo fruit is also popular and highly appreciated on Pemba Island and other parts of coastal Tanzania.

In the Tanzanian Mahale Mountains National Park, S. comorensis is dispersed by chimpanzees.
