= Peanut stew =

Stew in West African cuisine

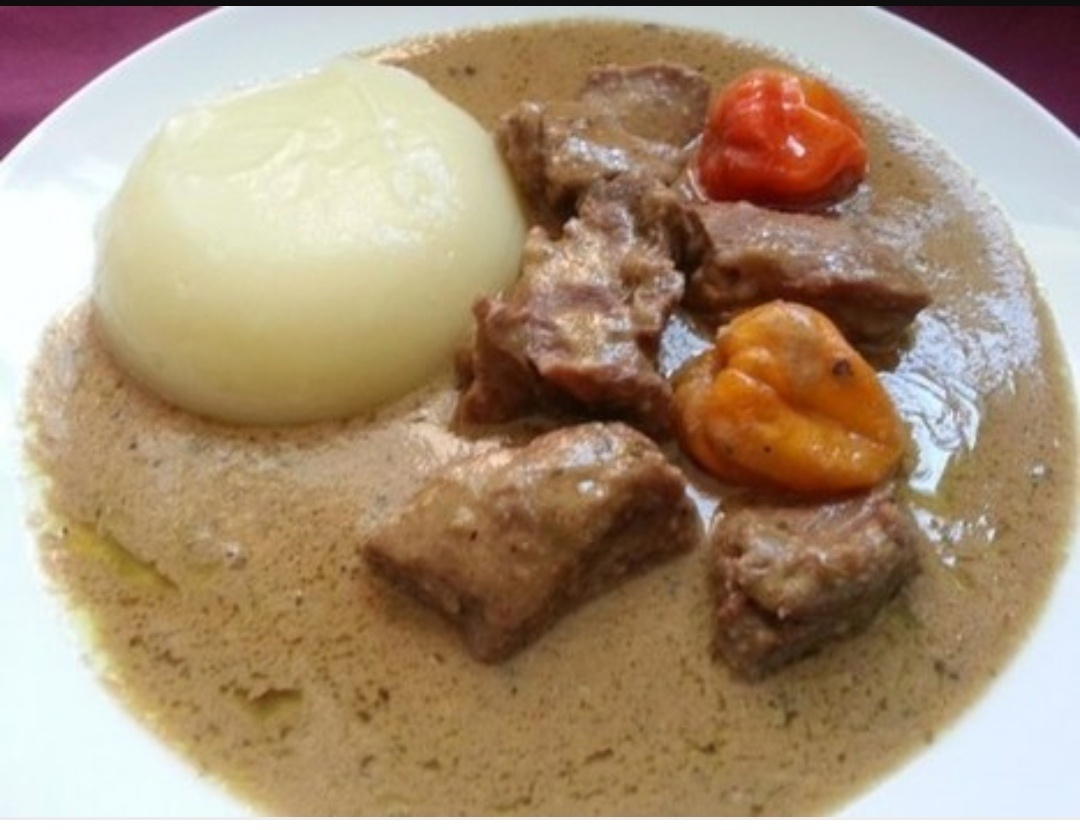
- Tigadèguèna
- Alternative names: Groundnut stew
- Type: Stew
- Place of origin: Senegal Mali
- Region or state: Senegal, Mali
- Main ingredients: Meat (lamb, beef, or chicken), tomatoes, onions, garlic, cabbage, leaf or root vegetables, peanuts
- Similar dishes: Domoda, djerma, kare-kare

Peanut stew or groundnut stew, also known as maafe (Wolof mafé, maffé, maffe), and pate d'arachide (French), is a staple food stew in Western Africa. While maafe is a dish originating from Senegal, in Mali tigadéguéna (Bambara tigadɛgɛna) is also a stew that originated from the Mandinka and Bambara people of Mali and served with Malian fufu (tuwo). The origins of maafe are mistakenly confused with those of tigadèguèna. Maafe is a dish from the colonial era that consisted of rice, among other things, and was not known in Mali before it was imported into Senegal. The concept of peanuts was also unknown in Mali but Bambara groundnuts were widely used to prepare a variety of dishes.

The proper name for it in the Mandinka language is domodah or tigadɛgɛna (lit. 'peanut butter sauce,' where tiga is 'peanut,' dɛgɛ is 'paste,' and na is 'sauce') in Bamanankan.

Domodah is a sauce, also used by Gambians, whose name has been borrowed from the Mandinka language. In Senegal domodah or domoda refers to flour-thickened soup or stew, which is different from maafe that uses peanut paste. Senegalese maafe is a favorite dish among several Senegalese Mauritanian and Gambian ethnic groups; it has become the national dish in Mali as well as a popular dish across West Africa, even outside West Africa such as in Cameroon and France.

Variants of Senegalese maafe appear in the cuisine of nations throughout West Africa and Central Africa. It is very similar to groundnut soup. It may be prepared with lamb, beef, chicken, or without meat. In Ghana, this stew is usually eaten with fufu.

== Variations ==
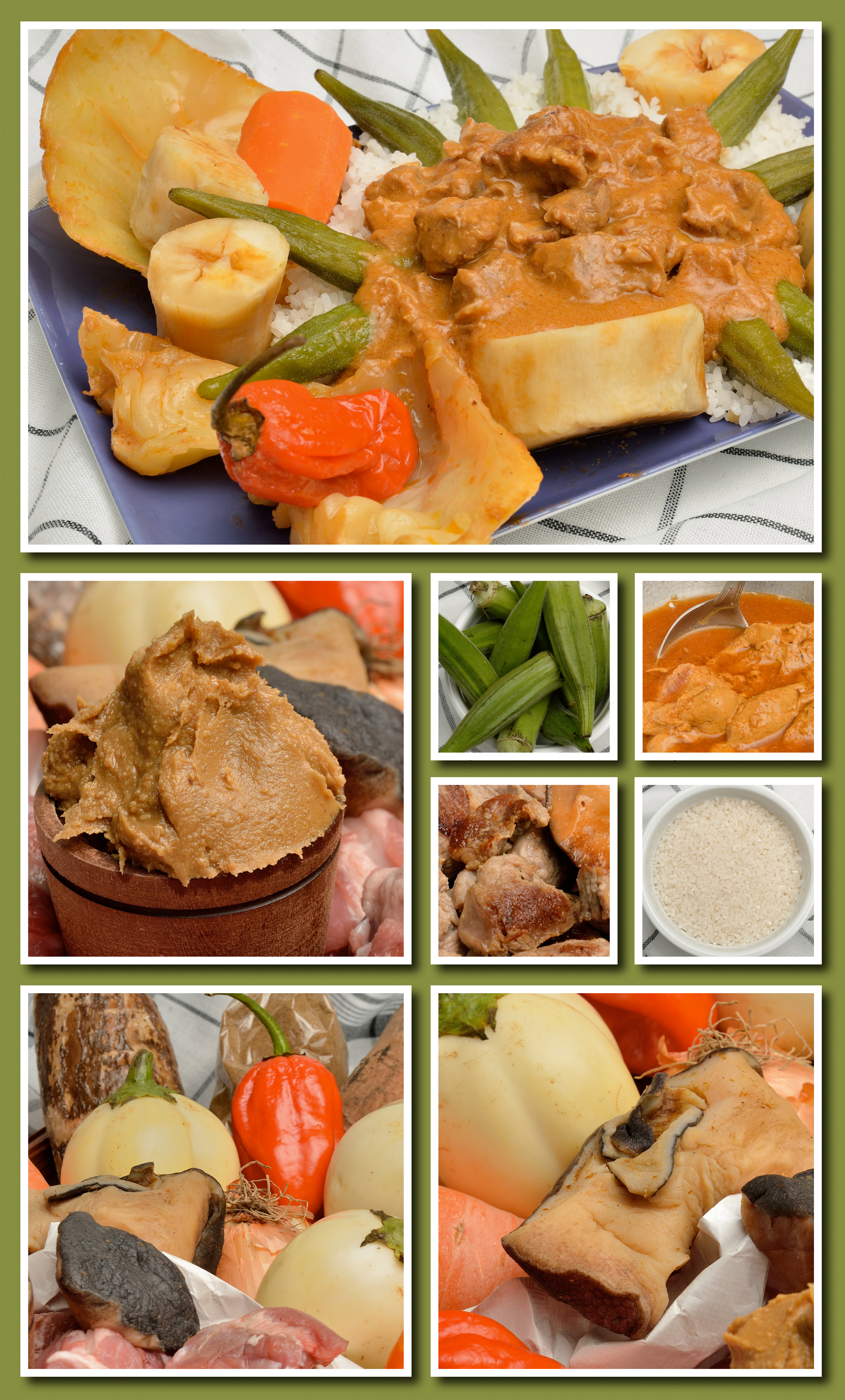
Senegalese maafe with vegetables

Recipes for the stew vary widely, but commonly include chicken, tomato, onion, garlic, cabbage, and leaf or root vegetables. Other versions include okra, corn, carrots, cinnamon, hot peppers, paprika, black pepper, turmeric, cumin, and other spices. Maafe is traditionally served with white rice (in Senegal, Mauritania, Guinea-Bissau and Gambia), fonio or to (millet dough) in Mali, tuwo or omo tuo (rice or millet dough) in Northern Nigeria, Niger, and Northern Ghana, couscous (as West Africa meets the Sahara, in Sahelian countries), or fufu and sweet potatoes in the more tropical areas, such as the Ivory Coast. Um'bido is a variation using greens, while Ghanaian maafe is cooked with boiled eggs. "Virginia peanut soup", a variation of Senegalese maafe even traveled with enslaved Africans to North America.

=== Senegalese maafe ===
Maafe or mafé was improved from bassi guerte, a peanut butter sauce served with chere a Senegalese couscous on millet basis. Malian tigadèguèna and Senegalese maafe being in taste and consistency different. Unlike Malian tigadèguèna, which is traditionally more watery and prepared with unrefined shea butter, the type of maafe prepared and consumed in Senegal is a rice-based dish with a creamy peanut paste sauce, tomato, oil, meat, onion, garlic, vegetables and spices which give it a particular flavor. Senegalese maafe is not only the national dish in Mali and Gambia, it is also prepared in various countries in West Africa as well as outside the African continent. In The Gambia, it is called domodah.

=== The Gambia ===
Domoda is a type of groundnut stew found in The Gambia. Domoda is prepared using ground peanuts or peanut butter, meat, onion, tomato, garlic, seasonal vegetables and spices. It has been described as one of the national dishes of The Gambia. Domoda is typically served over rice, and is also sometimes served over findi, a grain that is similar to couscous in consistency.

== Gallery ==
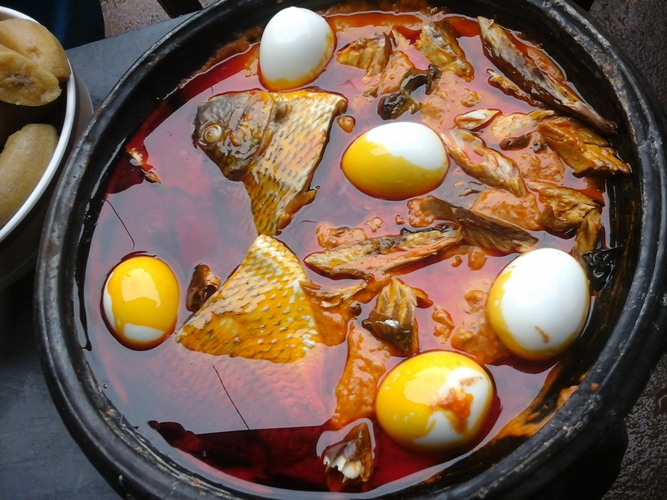
Groundnut stew prepared with fried groundnut paste, fish, eggs and hot palm oil

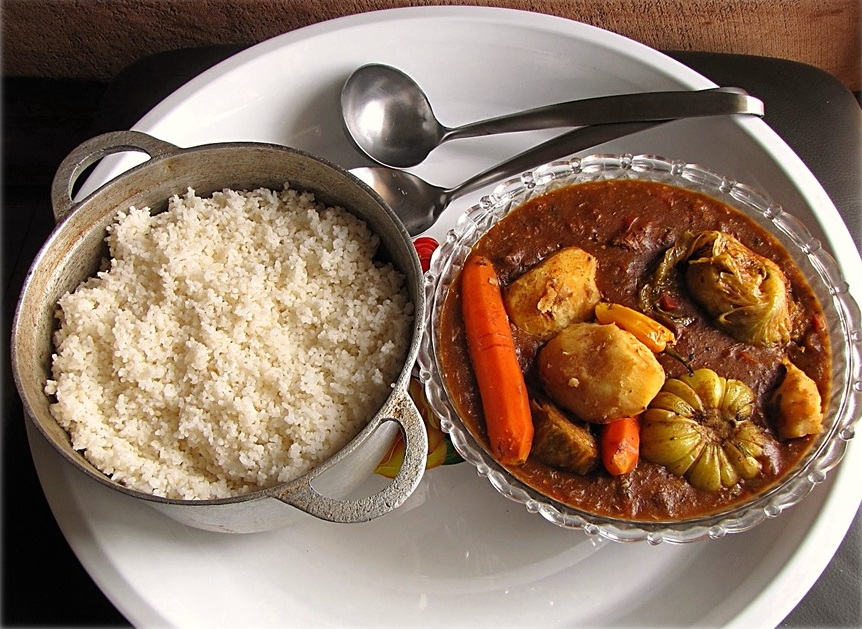
Senegalese maafe served with rice

== See also ==
- Cuisine of Mali
- Cuisine of Senegal
- Kare-kare
- List of African dishes
- List of peanut dishes
- List of sauces
- List of stews
- Peanut soup
