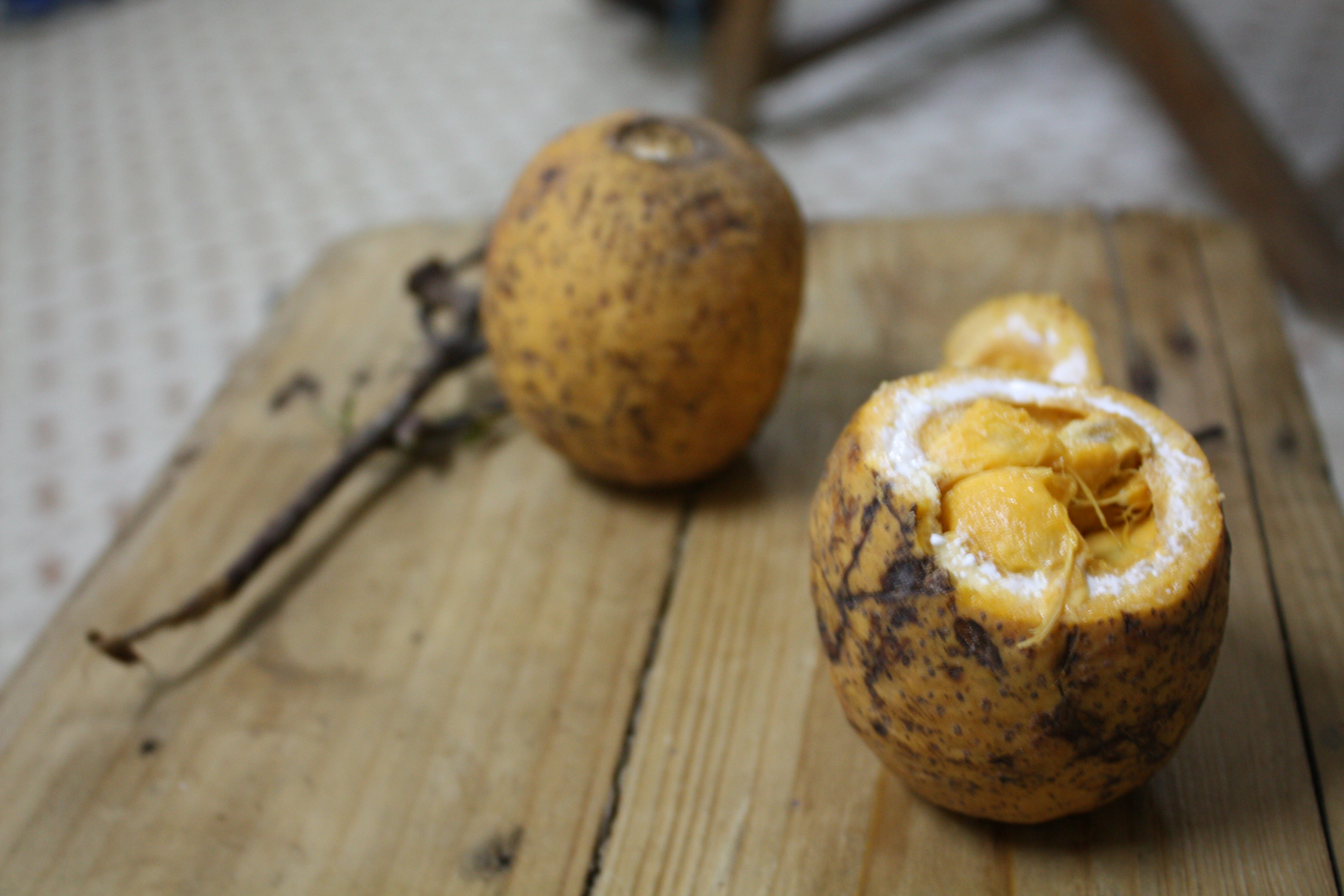

Scientific classification
- Kingdom: Plantae
- Clade: Tracheophytes
- Clade: Angiosperms
- Clade: Eudicots
- Clade: Asterids
- Order: Gentianales
- Family: Apocynaceae
- Genus: Saba
- Species: S. senegalensis

Binomial name
- Saba senegalensis (A.DC.) Pichon

= Saba senegalensis =

Species of tree

Saba senegalensis, known as weda in the Moore, "Oraa" in Dagaare, liane in French, màdd in Wolof, kabaa in Mandinka and laare in Pulaar, is a fruit-producing plant of the Apocynaceae family, native to the Sahel region of sub-Saharan Africa. It has several common names in various West African languages. The tree grows predominantly on riverbanks and in woodlands in Senegal, Mali, Guinea-Bissau, The Gambia, Burkina Faso, Somalia and Ivory Coast. It has been observed growing as vine up trees, as a small erect shrub, and oftentimes growing to the size of a large tree.

ICRISAT has cited S. senegalensis as a useful food crop plant and as a tool to combat soil degradation in rural Africa.

== Fruit ==
The fruit of Saba senegalensis has a hard yellow peel containing large seeds embedded in a yellowish pulp, having a pleasing acidity similar to that of the tamarind. The flavor has also been compared to that of a mango.

== Drink ==
Natives of the Sahel region often use the fruit to make a juice.

== Propagation ==
Saba senegalensis is most easily propagated through seeds. Once you acquire seeds, soak them in warm water for 24 hours. Then, start seeds directly in cactus soil mix. Do not overwater. The seeds should sprout within 2–4 weeks. Alternatively, if you have access to a live plant, it can by propagated by use of cuttings. Simply cut a 6-12 inch branch from the plant, and start directly in soil. The plant should fruit within 2–5 years of being planted.

== Growing ==
Saba senegalensis will grow best outdoors in USDA zones 10 and warmer. In a colder zone, one may have success growing it in a pot and bringing it indoors for winter.

== Common names ==
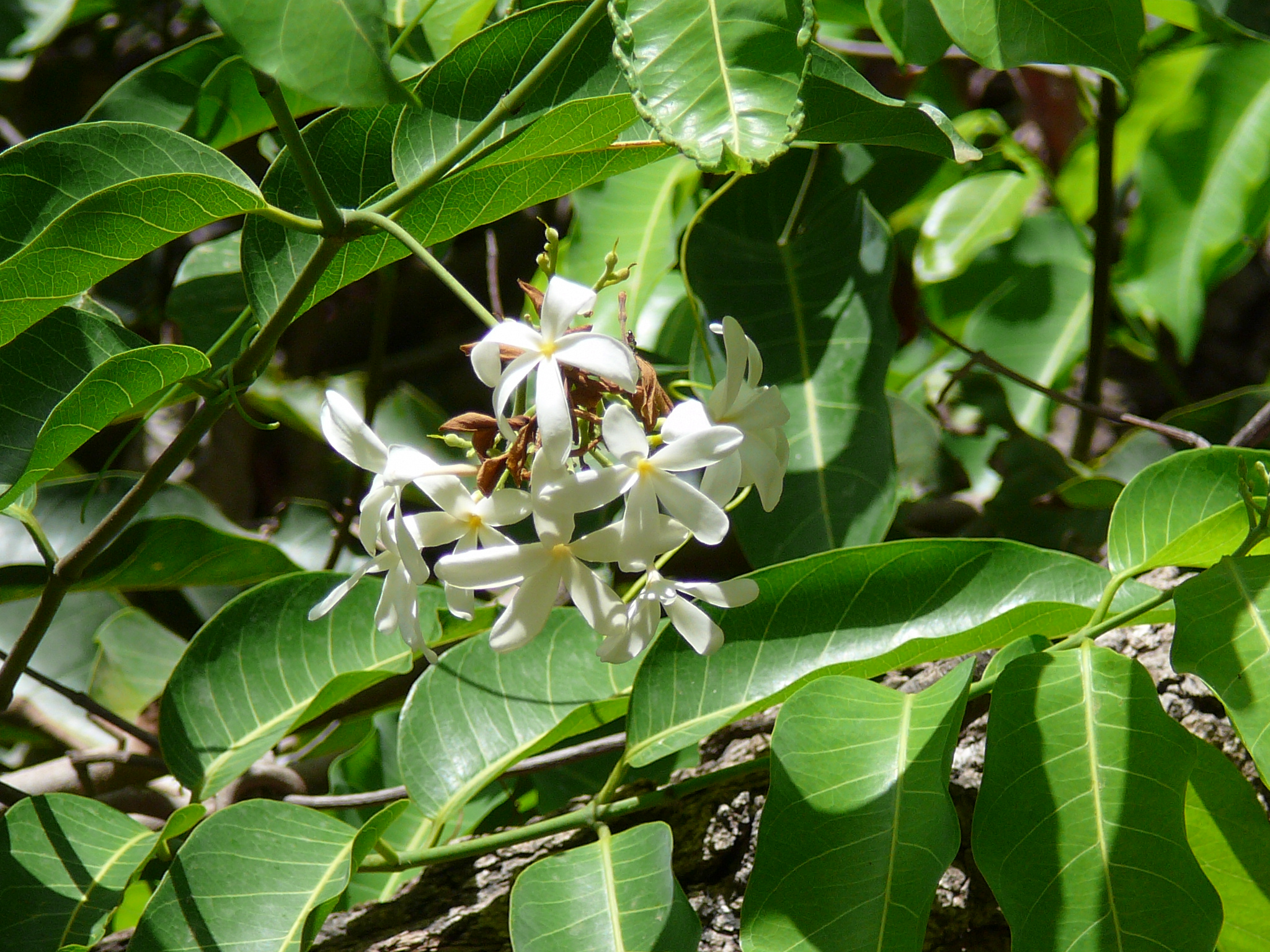
S. senegalensis flowers

- In the Moore language: "Weda"
- In the Wolof language: "Madd"
- In Mandinka: "Kabaa"
- In the Bambara language: "Zaban"
- In the French language: "Liane saba"
- In Côte d'Ivoire: "Saba" or "Cocota"
- In Sierra Leone Krio: "Malombo"
- In the Congo basin: "Malombo" or "Makalakonki"
- In Guinea Bissau, Kriolu language: "Foli lifanti"
- In Casamance, Senegal, Joola language: "Kuguissai"
- In Northern Nigeria, Hausa language: "Chiyo"
- In Somali: "Dhangalow"
- In Nigeria, Ibo language: "Utu"
- In Guinea, Fulani: "larè"
- In The Gambia, it is called "Kabba"
- In Senegal, "Madd"
- In Gabon: "Chini"
