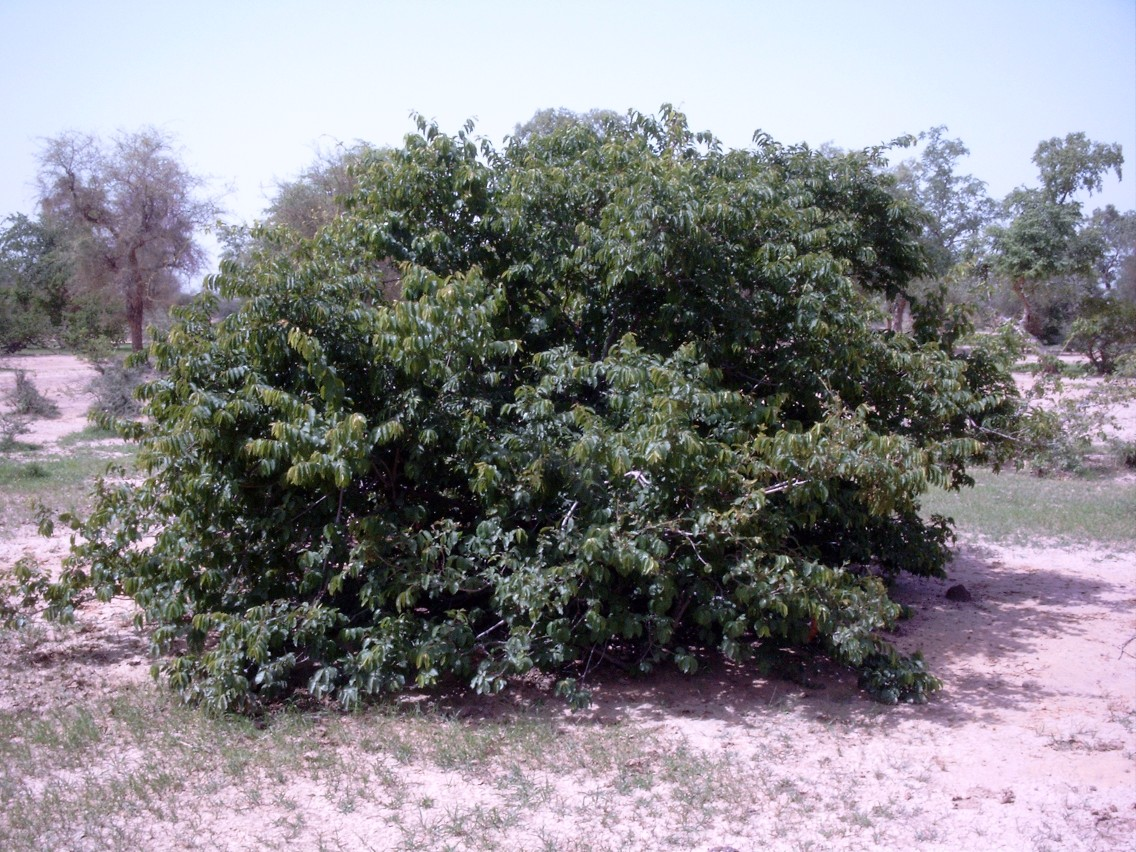
- Combretum micranthum, Burkina Faso

Scientific classification
- Kingdom: Plantae
- Clade: Tracheophytes
- Clade: Angiosperms
- Clade: Eudicots
- Clade: Rosids
- Order: Myrtales
- Family: Combretaceae
- Genus: Combretum
- Species: C. micranthum

Binomial name
- Combretum micranthum G. Don

= Combretum micranthum =

Kinkeliba

Species of flowering plant in the family Combretaceae

Combretum micranthum is a species of flowering plant in the family Combretaceae. It is a shrub known as kinkeliba in Guinea, Benin, Burkina Faso, Senegal, Mali and the Gambia across multiple regional dialects, where it is often found in tiger bush and on hills in West Africa. It is used for making tea and has uses in traditional medicine, and is used by many West African Muslims during Ramadan to break their fast. The name kinkeliba is believed to come from the Fulani language. It is referred to as douté in the Wolof language and ŋɔlɔbɛ in the Bambara language.

== Uses ==
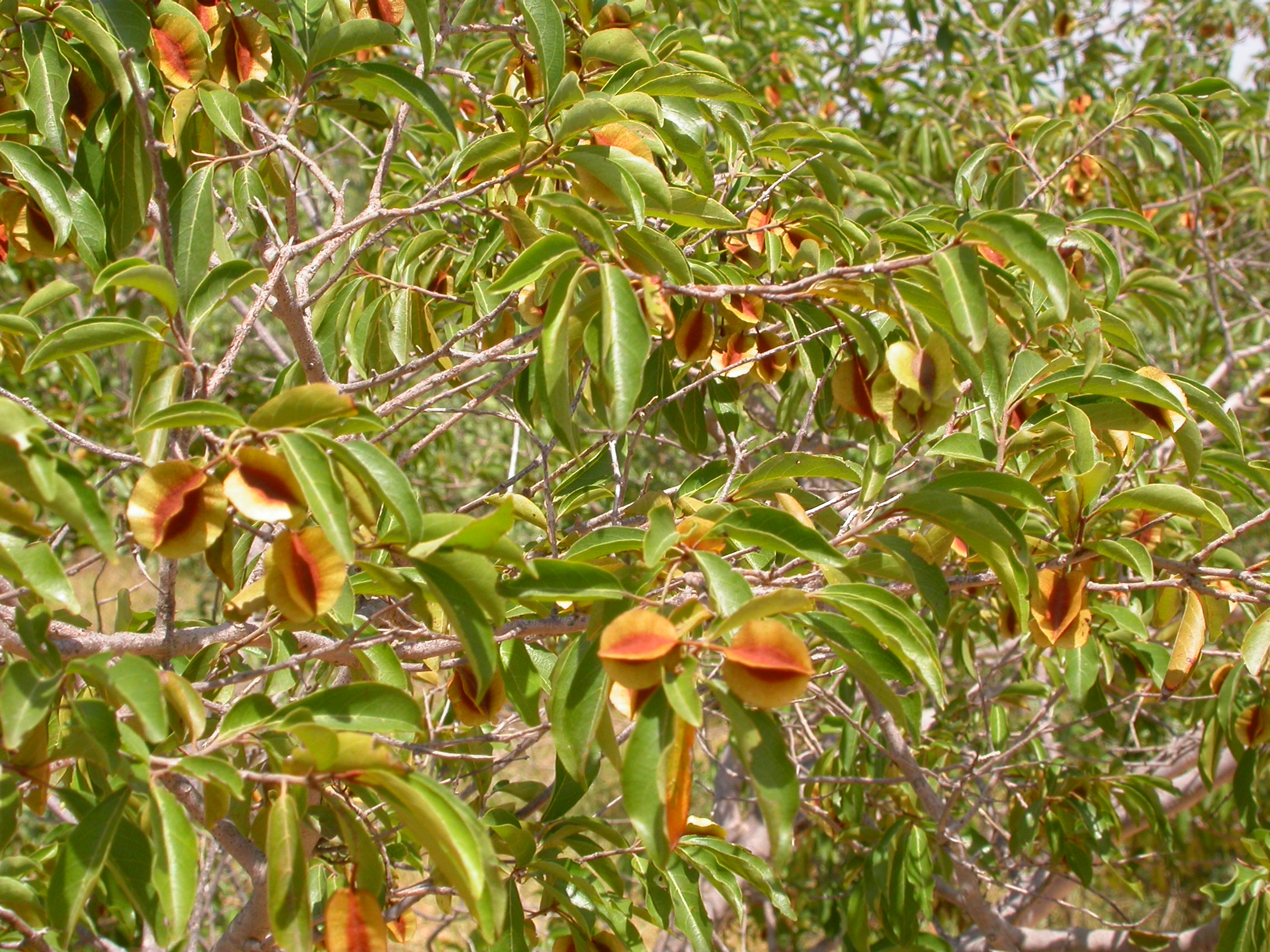
Combretum micranthum

The branches are quite strong, and are a useful material for building stools, beds, tool handles. A tea made by steeping the leaves in boiling water is a traditional tonic drink in tropical savannah countries such as Senegal, Mali and Burkina Faso. Among West African Muslims, especially Wolofs, Fulas, and Mandinkas, the leaves, bark, and twigs of kinkeliba are harvested and sold in bundles during the dry season leading up to and during the month of Ramadan. Kinkiliba is used daily to brew a strong tea that is mixed with sugar and milk and is drunk with bread at sundown as a means of breaking the daily fast.

A decoction of the root is used in West Africa for Guinea worm infestation.

== Phytochemicals ==
A 2024 study reported diverse phytochemicals in C. micranthum, including flavonoids and other polyphenols, alkaloids, fatty acids, terpenoids, steroids, and carbohydrates.
