= Chakery =

Senegalese millet couscous

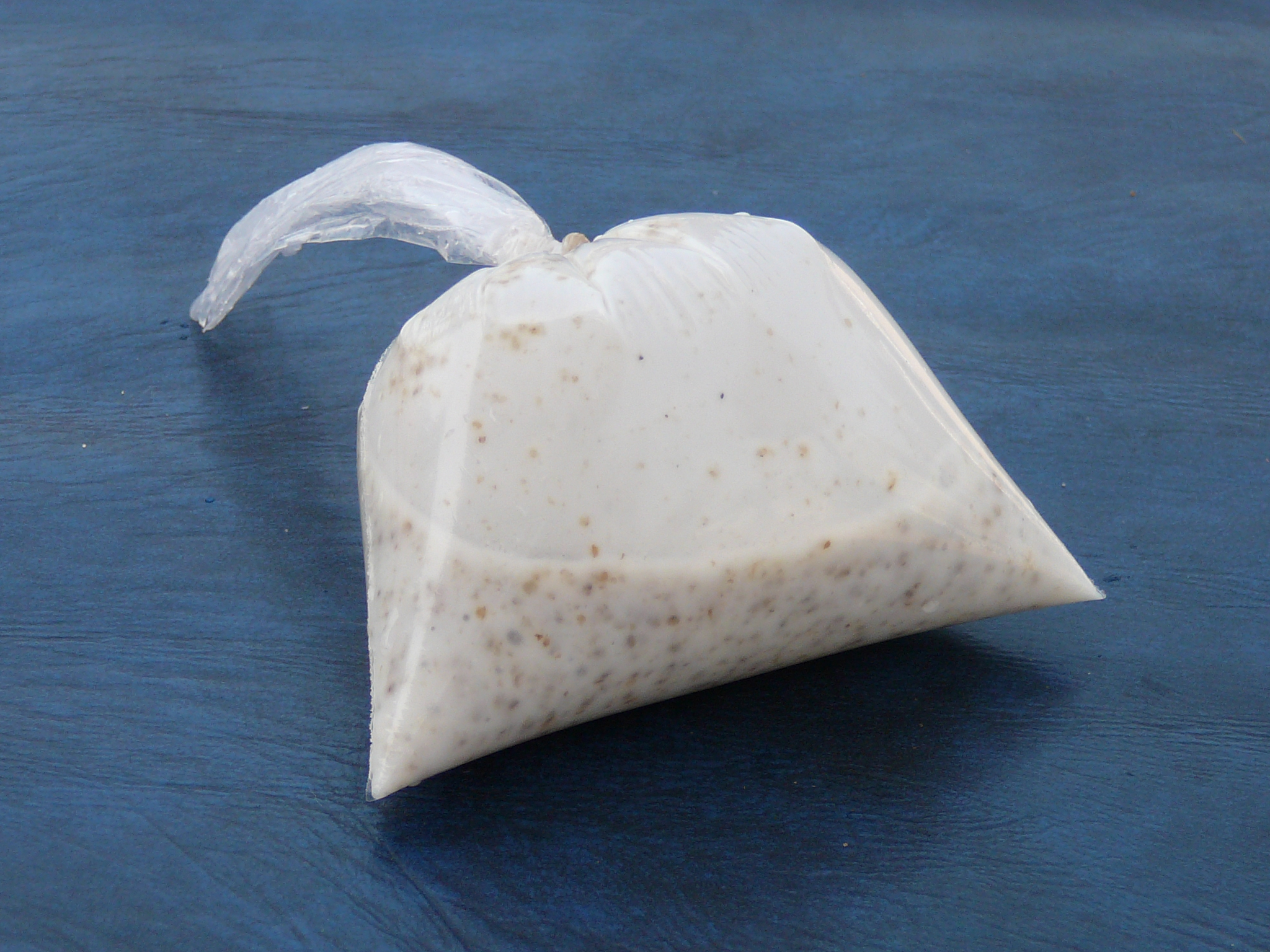
Chakery

Thiakry (also spelled thiacry or chakery, from Wolof: cakri), bodé in Fulani or dèguè in Bambara is a sweet millet couscous dish consumed in West Africa. Its first recipe dates from the era of the Fulani people in present day northern Senegal who are traditionally herdsmen, and spread throughout West Africa. The Gambian and Senegalese dessert is now known as a delightful afters in West Africa.The wheat or millet granules are mixed with milk, sweetened condensed milk, or yogurt, as well as dried fruit such as raisins, desiccated coconut, and spices such as nutmeg.
