= Banjul Breweries =

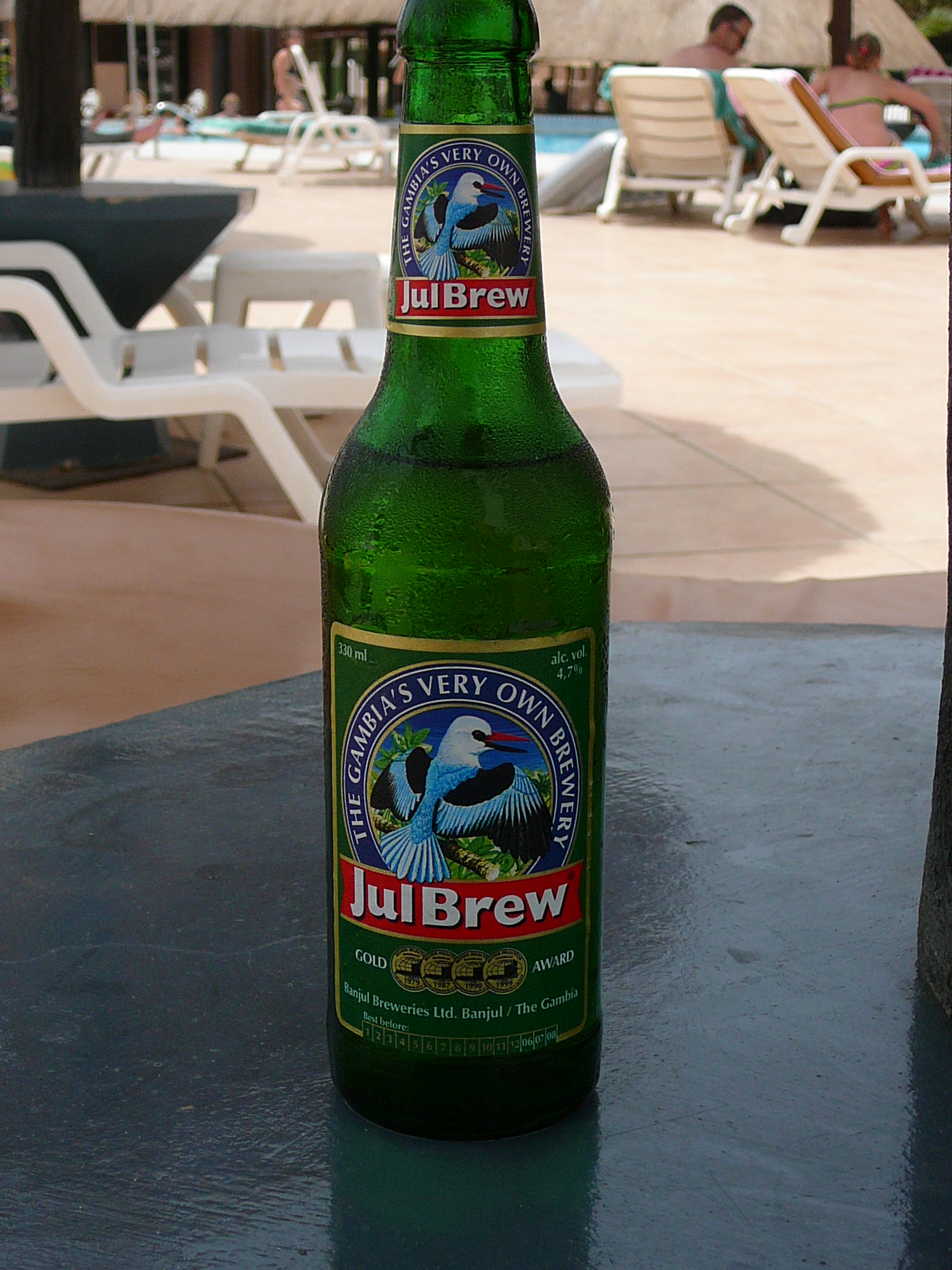
Julbrew, a brand of beer produced by Banjul Breweries

Banjul Breweries was a brewery located in Banjul, The Gambia. It was the only brewery located in The Gambia, producing beer and other non-alcoholic drinks. The company was known for Julbrew, its brand of beer.

== History ==
Banjul Breweries incorporated in 1973, started construction in 1975, and started production in 1977. The company is one of the oldest companies in Gambia and is the only brewery. The company is owned by Castel Group.

The company currently produces five types of beer: Julbrew Beer, Julbrew Export, Julbrew Draught, Castel Beer, and Guinness. Soft drinks produced by the company include World Cola, La Gazelle Lemonade, Malta Tonic, Youki drinks, and Vimto..

The company won the Monde Selection Gold Award in 1979, 1987, 1990, and 1999. In 2013, the brewery equipped the Gambia Police Force with electronics, stationary, and drinks. In 2017, the management of Banjul Breweries was questioned by police for alleged using expired ingredients and producing unregistered drinks.

The brewery shut down in April 2020, following an increase in taxes from 10 to 75 percent by the Finance Ministry of The Gambia.
