= Domoda =

Senegalese dish

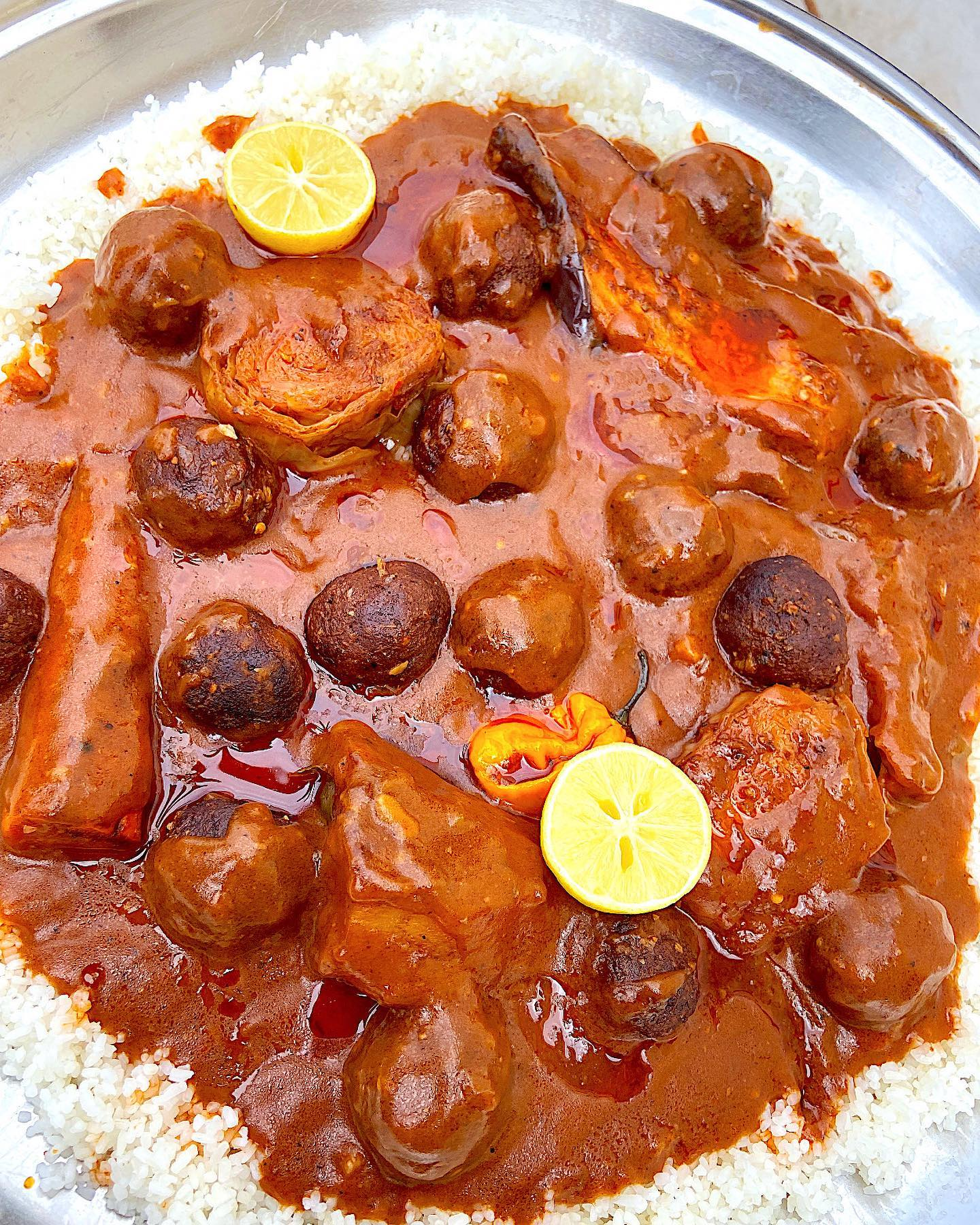
- Domoda or Domoda farine
- Alternative names: Domoda farine
- Place of origin: Senegal
- Region or state: Eastern
- Other information: Tomato-based

Domoda (also known as domoda farine or domodah) is a Senegalese dish. The name ragout comes from the French, a smooth, tomato-based sauce prepared with vinegar and vegetables, to which flour (farine) is added to thicken the sauce. Domoda is one of the emblematic recipes of Senegalese gastronomy. Alongside dishes such as thieboudienne and yassa, it is a favorite in Senegal. It is consumed mainly in Senegal, Mauritania, The Gambia, Guinea-Bissau and Guinea.

Domoda can be made with meat or fish. It is usually served with white rice. Lemon juice is added to give it its distinctive tangy flavor.
