= Nigerian cuisine =

Culinary traditions of Nigeria

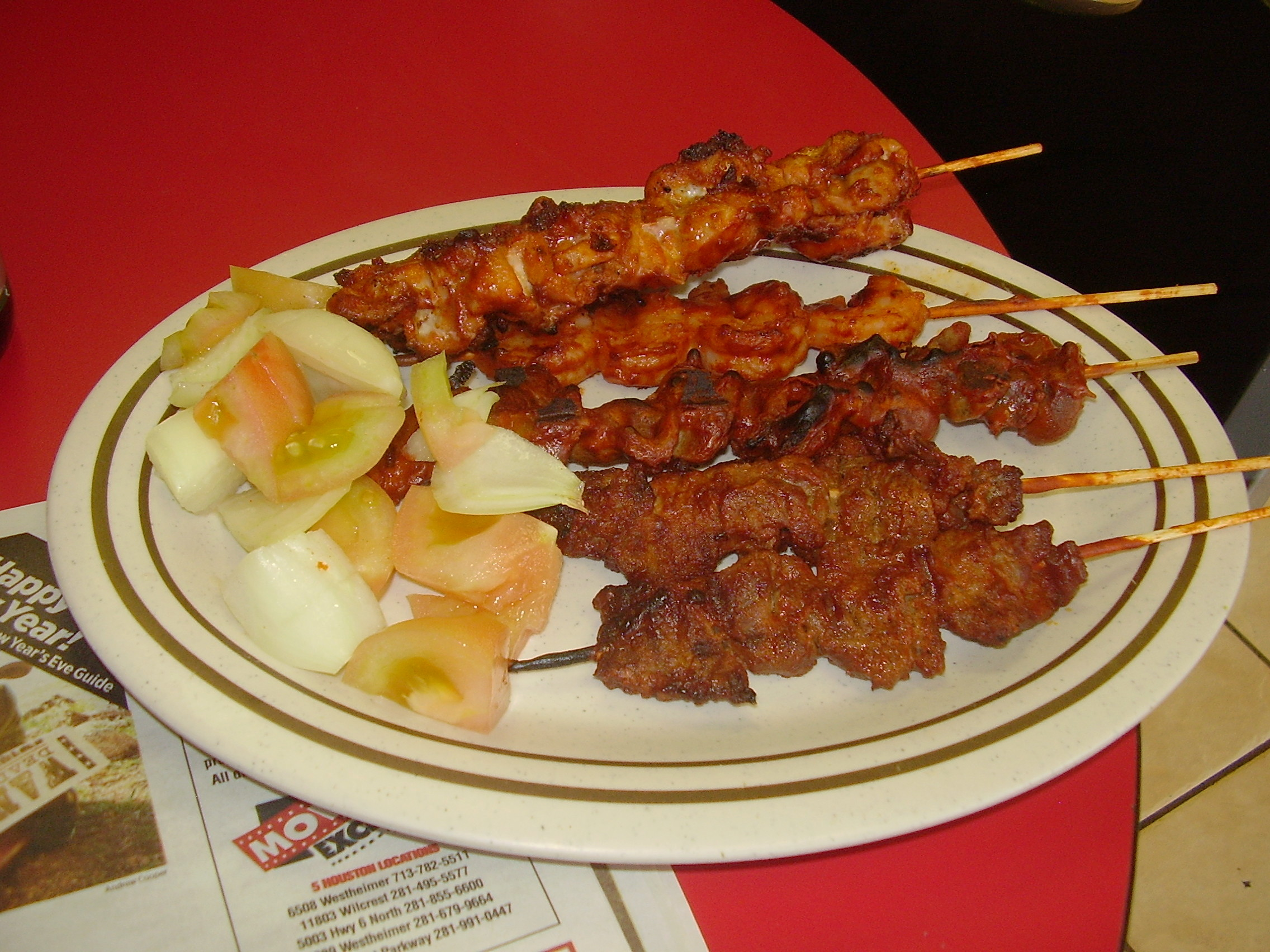
Suya

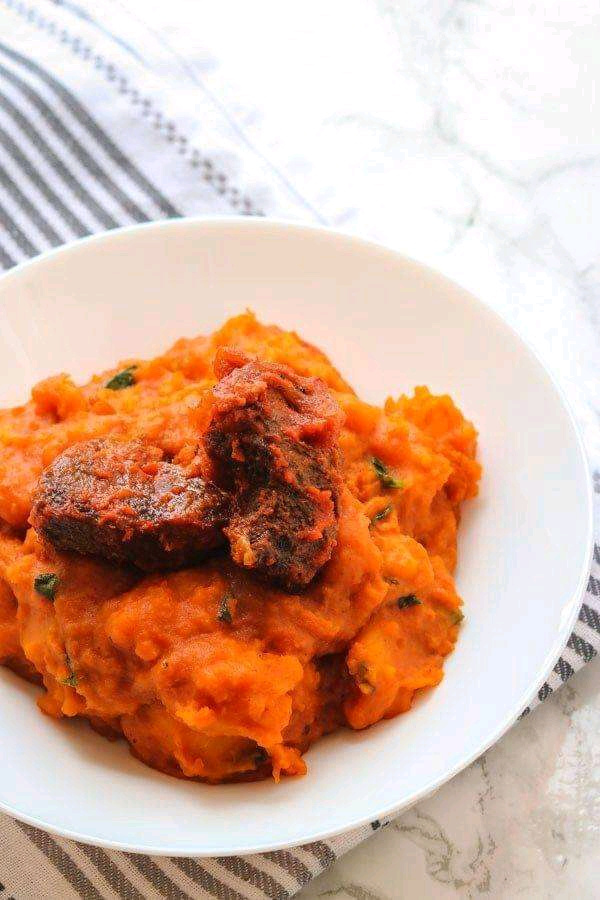
Asaro

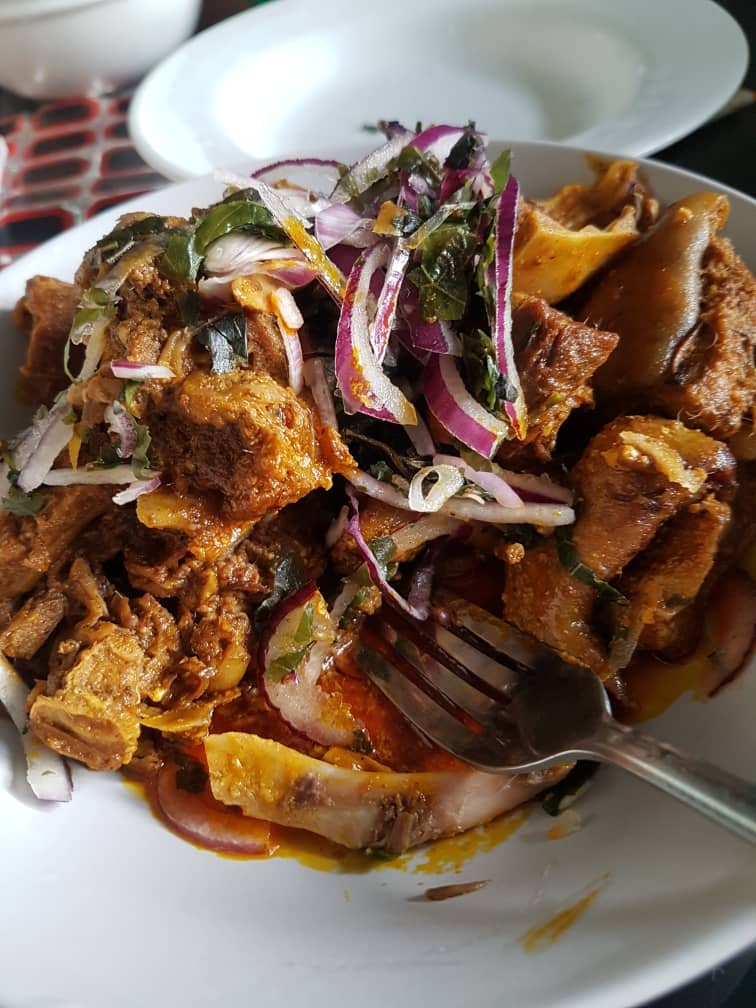
Nkwobi

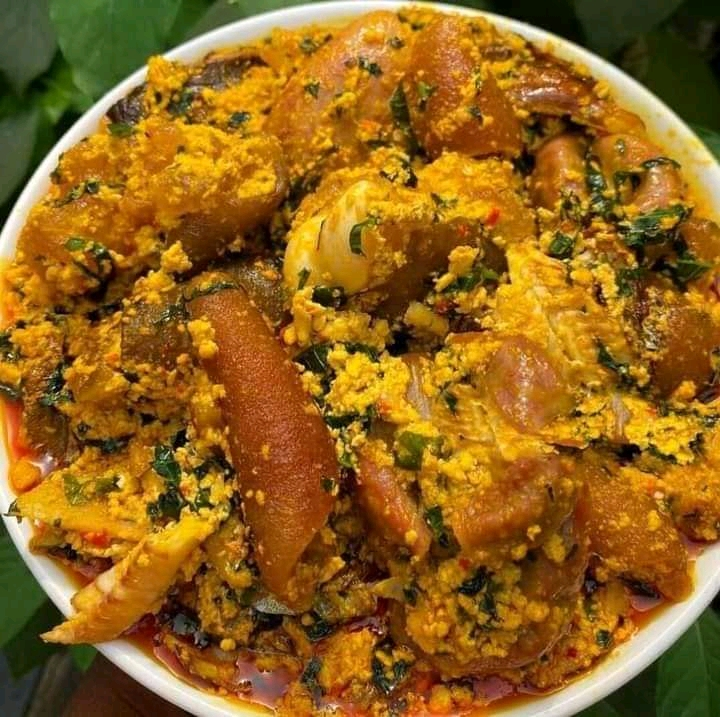
Egusi soup with ponmo, beef and fish

Nigerian cuisine consists of dishes or food items from the hundreds of Native African ethnic groups that comprise Nigeria. Like other West African cuisines, it uses spices and herbs with palm oil or groundnut oil to create deeply flavored sauces and soups.

Nigerian feasts can be colourful and lavish, while aromatic market and roadside snacks cooked on barbecues or fried in oil are in abundance and varied.

Tropical fruits such as watermelon, pineapple, coconut, banana, orange, papaya and mango are mostly consumed in Nigeria.

Nigerian cuisine, like many West African cuisines, is known for being savoury and spicy.

== History ==
Nigerian cuisine has emerged from available resources in agriculture. Crops like yam, African rice, black-eyed peas, millet, sorghum, okro, egusi, and palm oil, amongst others are native to the Nigerian region and are staple foods in cooking. Introduced crops from trade, such as cassava and corn, are also common in Nigerian cuisine. A variety of native-grown vegetables are also staples. Indigenous fruit trees including African star apple (Chrysophyllum albidum), African mango (Irvingia gabonensis), African or native pear (Dacryodes edulis), hog plum (Spondias mombin) and garden egg are important as well. Yam is mainly produced in West Africa, in countries including Côte d'Ivoire, Ghana, Togo, Benin, Nigeria, and Cameroon, which collectively represent 97% of African yam production.

Nigerian meals are traditionally made up of carbohydrate-rich foods like rice, yams, and potatoes, often accompanied by protein sources such as beef, goat, mutton, fish and chicken. Nigerian dishes frequently include hot peppers and a variety of spices, giving the cuisine its distinctive flavors.

Nigerian cuisine hails from 371 different ethnic groups, each providing unique cooking methods, ingredients, and ceremonial practices, evolving and continuing to evolve over the course of millennia. The Federal Ministry of Arts, Culture and Creative Economy recognise the diverse culinary culture of Nigeria as diverse as the nation's ethnic demographics. Traditional dishes such as Fufu and Ugba reflect the diversity of Nigeria's ethnic groups and form a part of national heritage.

== Entrees ==
=== Rice-based ===
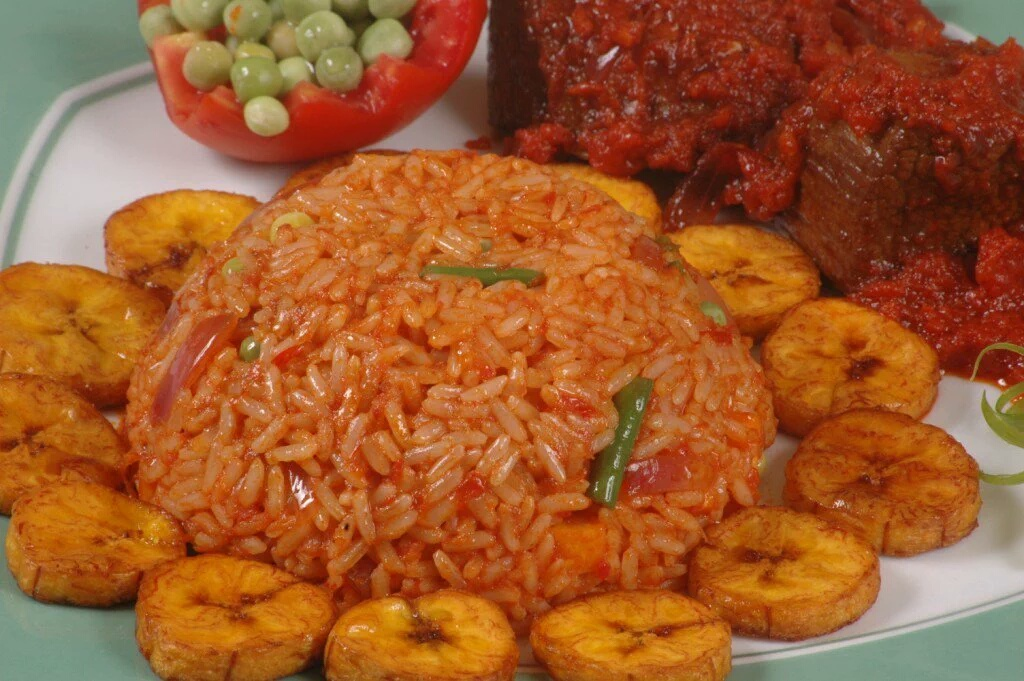
Jollof rice, meat and dodo

- Coconut rice is rice made with coconut milk, and other spices.
- Jollof rice is a rice dish made with pureed tomato and Scotch bonnet-based sauce.
- Ofada rice is a South West Nigerian rice variety. It is eaten with ayamase or ofada sauce.
- Fried rice is a rich dish made with mixed vegetables (cabbage, carrots, green peas), meat, poultry or prawns.
- Pate is made with ground dry corn, rice or acha. Mostly combined with vegetables (spinach), tomatoes, onions, peppers, garden eggs (eggplants), locust beans, groundnuts, biscuit bones and minced meat are common in northwestern Nigeria, like Kano, Kaduna, Nassarawa and Plateau.
- Tuwo masara is a corn-flour dish eaten in Northern Nigeria.
- Tuwo shinkafa, thick rice pudding usually eaten with miyan kuka (a thick soup) and goat meat stew or miyan taushe, a pumpkin stew made with spinach, meat (usually goat or mutton) and smoked fish. It is primarily served in the northern part of the country.
- White rice—White rice and local rice is usually served with stews, pepper soup and sauces. It is widely served with a thick tomato and pepper-based stew.
- Banga rice is a traditional Nigerian rice recipe made from palm nut and rice. It is very common in the southern (Delta State) and eastern parts of the country.
- Palm-oil rice is often referred to as 'local rice' or 'yellow rice'; it is usually prepared with fresh palm oil, assorted fish (dried fish and smoked fish), and garnished with local spices like locust beans ('okpeyi' or 'dawa dawa'), onions and pepper. It could be made as jollof or as white rice with the palm oil stew as a separate sauce.
- Curried rice is rice made with fresh turmeric or curry powder, onions, salt and seasoning to taste and then vegetable sauce is made to go along with it.

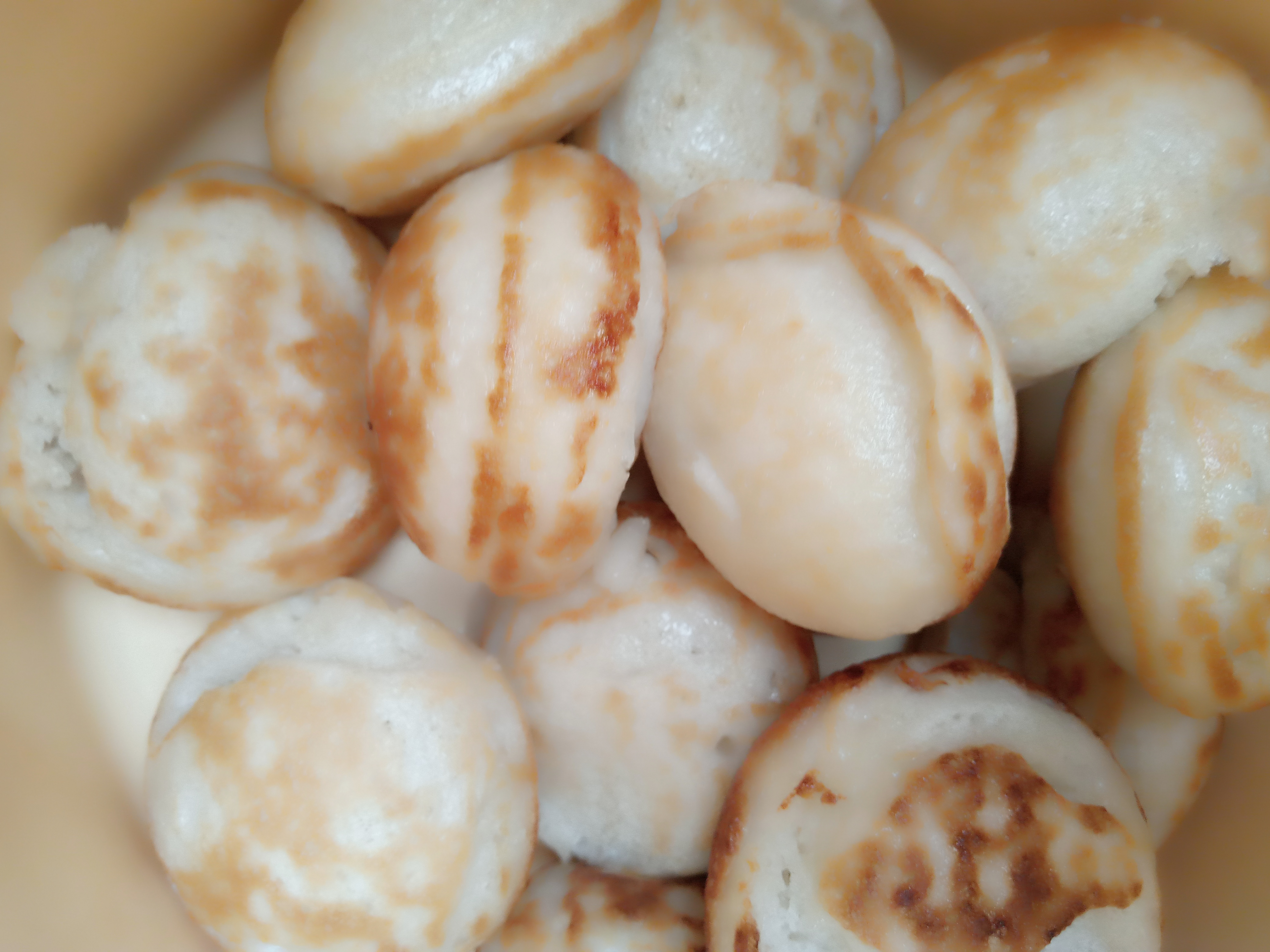
Masa is a northern Nigerian specialty which is also known as waina among the northerners in Nigeria.

- Masa is made from 'tuwo shinkafa' rice that is blended after being destoned (onions and other spices are put in it). Then, yeast is added, and it is allowed to rise. It is later cooked on low heat in a custom-made masa pot.
- Danbu rice is also a type of rice usually made in the North. It used to be ground and mixed with pepper.
- Groundnut oil rice is prepared with groundnut oil, using fish (dry or fresh), fresh tomatoes, onions, fresh pepper and a lot of crayfish.

=== Bean-based ===
- Akara, also known as 'bean cake', is a type of fritter made from beans originating from Yoruba people of Southwestern Nigeria.
- Gbegiri, a bean-based soup from Yoruba people of Southwestern Nigeria.
- Abula soup. Abula is a combination of gbegiri, ewedu (vegetable soup) and stew. It is usually eaten with either amala (dried yam flour fufu) or lafun (dried cassava flour fufu) by the Yorubas in the southwestern part of Nigeria.
- Moi moi, also known as 'Ọ̀lẹ̀lẹ̀', originated from the Yoruba people of Southwestern Nigeria. It is a steamed bean pudding made from a mixture of washed and peeled black-eyed beans, blended together with onions and fresh ground peppers.
- Ekuru, a steamed savoury bean dish from the Yorubas of Southwestern Nigeria.
- Ewa aganyin, boiled beans eaten with a pepper sauce from Yorubas of Southwest Nigeria.
- Okpa, a common breakfast food made from Bambara nut flour popular among Igbos of Southeastern Nigeria.
- Adalu, a bean and sweet corn pottage from Yorubas of Southwest Nigeria.

=== Corn-based ===
- Egbo, a Yoruba specialty that can be eaten alone with pepper sauce or paired with beans.

== Meat ==
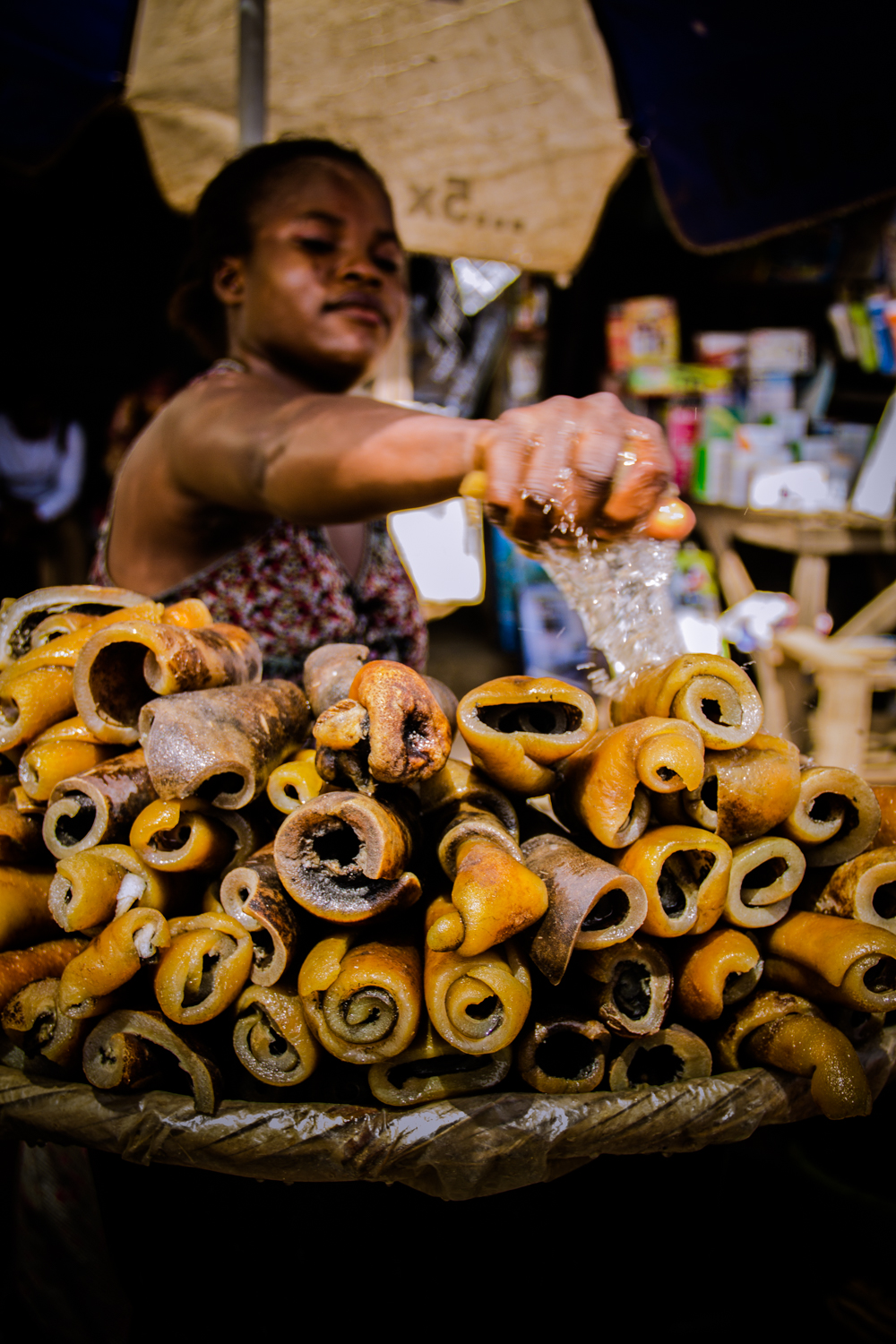
Woman selling ponmo (cow skin)

Meat is used in most Nigerian dishes.

- Suya, from the north of Nigeria, is a grilled meat coated with ground chili pepper, peanut powder, and other local spices. It is prepared barbecue-style using a skewer. This is one of the most famous Nigerian specialties and can be found within easy reach all over the country.
- Tsire refers specifically to meat which has a generous coating of peanut/chili powder. The meat may or may not be on a skewer.
- Kilishi is similar to beef jerky. It is made from meat that has been cut into very thin slices, which are then spread out to dry. A preparation of chili pepper, spices and local herbs is then prepared into a paste which is lightly brushed on both sides. This is then briefly grilled.
- Balangu refers to meat that has been grilled over a wood or coal fire. The meat is typically cooked in brown paper. Specifically, no seasoning is applied to bring out the natural flavour of the particular type of meat which may be goat, mutton or beef. Salt and spices can be added later according to taste.
- Dambu nama is a meat floss from Northern Nigeria.
- Nkwobi consists of cooked cow legs smothered in a thick, spicy palm oil sauce, a classic dish originating from southeast Nigeria.
- Asun is spicy roasted goat chopped into bite-sized pieces, with bold aromatic flavors from onions, habanero, garlic and bell peppers. It is native to the Yoruba people of Ondo, South Western Nigeria.
- Peppered Ponmo is a typed of stewed goat or cow skin dish
- Bushmeat is also consumed in Nigeria. The grasshopper (cane rats) and giant african land snail are the most popular bushmeat species in Nigeria. Other bushmeat consumed include Antelope and duiker.

== Soups and stews ==
- Egusi soup is prepared from thickened ground melon seeds. It contains leafy vegetables, seasonings, and meat. It is often eaten with dishes like amala, pounded yam, fufu, and eba.
- Banga soup is made from palm nuts and is eaten primarily in the south and mid-western parts of Nigeria. It is also known as atama soup by the Cross River and Akwa Ibom indigenes. This soup is usually made through extracting the juice from the palm nuts. It is usually served with any kind of swallow (garri, semo and pounded yam).
- Ofe akwu is also made from palm nuts, but prepared more like a stew meant to be eaten with rice and it is native to the Igbo people.
- Miyan kuka, very common among the Hausa people, is made from powdered baobab leaves and dried okra.
- Miyan yakuwa is a Hausa soup.
- Ewedu soup is popular amongst the Yoruba people of south-western Nigeria. Ewedu soup is usually prepared with jute leaves and cooked by pureeing the leaves with a blender or special broom.
- Ila alasepo is an okra soup dish of the Yoruba people. It usually contains many meat, fish and seafood varieties.
- Eka soup (beniseed soup) is a popular dish among the Idomas of Benue State, the Ogojas in Cross River and the Ibirams of Kogi State. Eka is a blend of sesame seeds, roasted groundnut and palm kernel puree.
- Margi special is common in the northeastern part of Nigeria, Borno, Adamawa and Yobe states. The soup comes from the Margi people who live in riverine areas. It is prepared with fresh fish of any kind and African soreal (yakuwa in Hausa or omblanji in Margi).
- Edikang-ikong is a vegetable soup made from ugu (pumpkin) leaves and waterleaf which originated from the Annang, Ibibio and Efik people.
- Gbegiri is a bean-based stew from southwest Nigeria.
- Pepper soup is a light soup made from a mix of meat and fish with herbs and spices. This is one of the few soups in Nigerian cuisine that can be eaten alone and is not used as a sauce for a carbohydrate main dish such as fufu or pounded yam. It can also be made with nutmeg and chili peppers. It can be garnished with fish, beef, goat meat or chicken. Pepper soup is sometimes an appetizer at official gatherings; however, it is consumed also in the evening at pubs and social gatherings.
- Afang is a vegetable soup which originated with the Efik people, Ibibio people and Ananng people in southeast Nigeria. It is prepared with waterleaf, afang (wild spinach), pomo, periwinkles and lots of assorted meat and fish.
- Corn soup, also known locally as omi ukpoka, is made with ground dry corn and blended with smoked fish. It is a common food of the Afemai, especially people from Agenebode in northern Edo state.
- Okra soup is made from okra and cooked until thickened.
- Efo riro, a stew made from leafy vegetables, pepper, palm oil and other ingredients, is common amongst the Yorubas.
- Miyan taushe, a blend of groundnut and pumpkin leaves spiced with pepper, dawadawa or iru, and bouillon cubes. It is best with tuwo shinkafa.

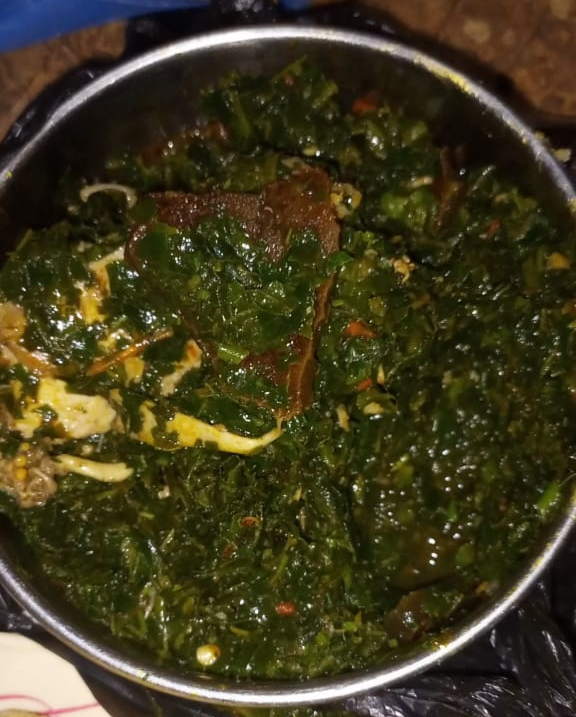
Egburegbu soup usually prepared by Ebonyi State Indigenous people

- Maafe, a stew made with groundnuts (peanuts), tomatoes and onions as the base, can be varied with chicken, beef or fish and different leafy vegetables for subtle flavours. Groundnut stew is made with ground dry groundnuts and vegetables, fish, meat, local seasoning and palm oil by the Etsakor people in Edo state.
- Buka stew, is a Yoruba stew made from goat, beef or chicken; it is mainly cooked with tomatoes, onions, and pepper.
- Ogbono soup is made with ground ogbono seeds, with leafy greens, other vegetables, seasonings, and meat. Ogbono is also eaten with many dishes similar to pounded yam, amala, and fufu.
- Ofe nsala, made with utazi leaves, its origins are from the Igbo people.
- Ofe onugbu is made with cocoyam, palm oil, assorted fish and meat and seasonings, it is a dish native to the Igbo people.
- Ofada stew (ayamase) is a palm-oil-based stew native to the Yoruba people. It is made with palm oil, unripe pepper and tomatoes, beef, tripe, cow skin and locust beans. It is a stew for local ofada rice, also referred to as brown rice, usually served in 'ewe' (flat, broad leaves).
- Groundnut soup (peanut soup) is made from fresh peanut ground to paste, (though some may fry the peanut), fried in palm oil with onions and then boiled in stock.
- Ofe oha is made with cocoyam that used to be cooked and pounded, palm oil and seasonings, it is native to the Igbo people.
- Edo esan (black soup) is made mainly from scent leaf, uziza leaf and bitter leaf.
- Ofe owerri is prepared with four kinds of vegetable leaves; okazi, ugu, uziza and oha leaves. A particular species of cocoyam is used as a thickener to make the soup thick. This vegetable soup is common among the igbos of eastern Nigeria. 'Ofe' means soup in igbo language and 'Owerri' is the capital city of Imo state in eastern Nigeria.
- Ofe achara, mostly found in Abia State- Ndiwo, Ngwa, Umuahia, Itumbauzo, it is native to the Igbo people.
- Ofe okazi, is a soup native to the Igbo People, it is made with wild spinach, achi (thickener), assorted meat and fish.
- Egg soup, is made with eggs, scent leaves, fresh pepper and palm oil.
- Snail pepper soup is prepared with African giant snail as the main ingredient.
- Yam pepper soup is made using soft white Puna yam.
- Otong soup is popular among the Efik tribe, and made using ugu leaves, uziza leaves, and okra.
- Ofe Ujuju, popular among the Igbo people, is made with ujuju leaves, meats, fish, and seasoning.

== Side dishes ==
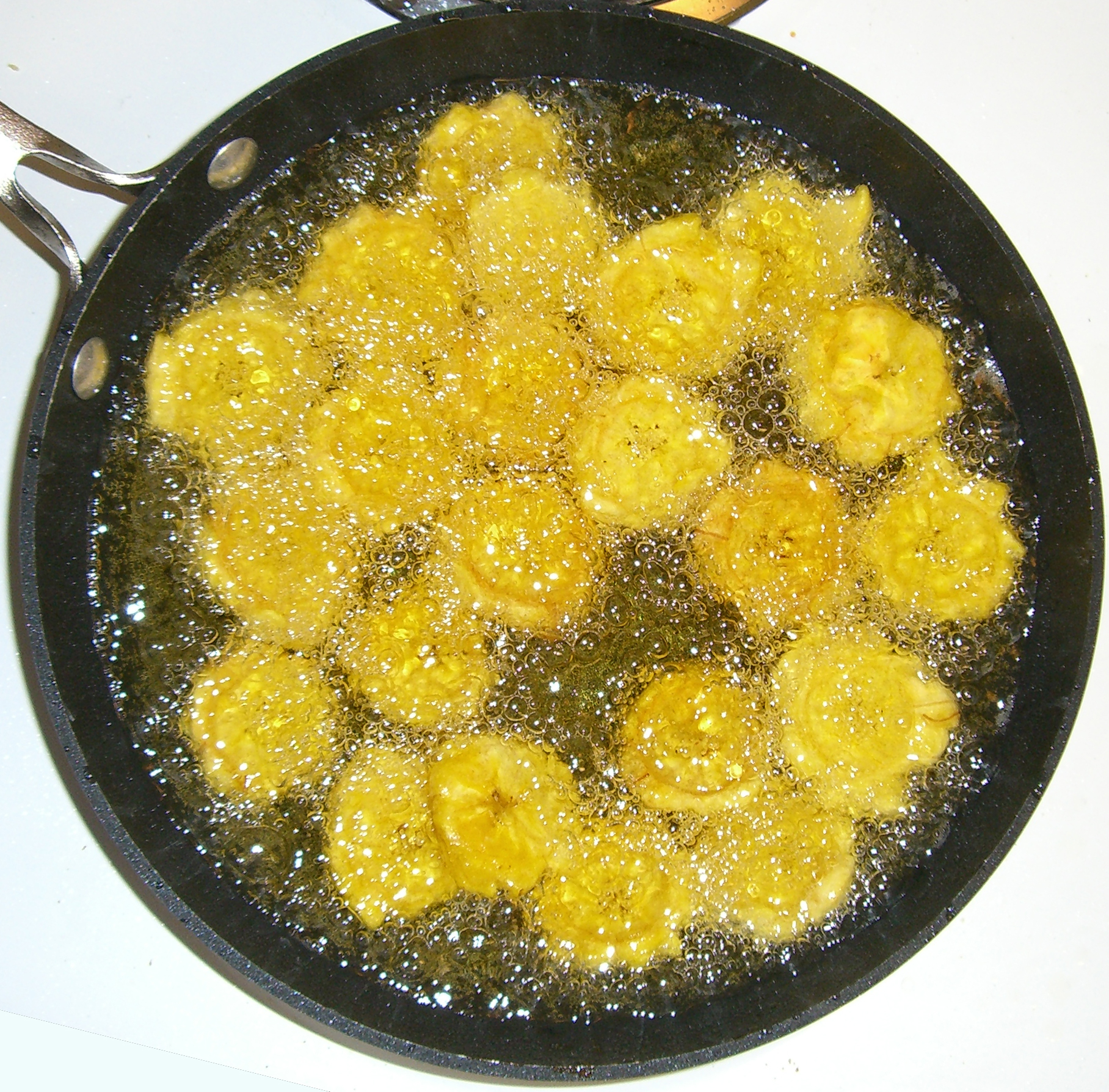
Dodo (fried plantain)

- Dodo is a side dish of plantains fried in vegetable or palm oil, preferably ripe plantain.
- Gizdodo is a combination of fried dodo and grilled gizzard.
- Peppered gizzard, pomo (Yoruba word for cow skin), shaki (Yoruba word for tripe)
- Funkaso, millet pancakes
- Mosa, fermented corn ground into a thick paste, fried then sprinkled with sugar. It is an acquired taste. An alternative form made from very soft plantain, mashed into a paste, mixed with dried black pepper, fried, then sprinkled with sugar.
- Abacha, a dish originating from South-eastern Nigeria.

== Puddings, pastes and porridges ==
- Moin moin is a savoury Yoruba steamed bean pudding made from a mixture of peeled black-eyed peas and wrapped in a leaf (like a banana leaf).
- Plantain pudding commonly known as okpo ogede.
- Corn pudding locally known as okpo oka.
- Rice pudding made from blended 'tuwon rice' and poured into boiling water. It should be stirred continuously on a moderate fire until it is ready.
- Pap or 'akamu' or 'ogi' made from guinea corn, millet or corn.
- Tapioca pudding is made from cassava extract, it is similar to pap due to its physical appearance and the way it is prepared.
- Ekpang nkukwo, is of freshly blended water yam and cocoyam, wrapped in fresh cocoyam leaves, cooked with periwinkles, assorted fish and meat, crayfish, palm oil and other spices. This dish is common with the Efik and Ibibio people in the Southern part of Nigeria.

=== Yam-based ===
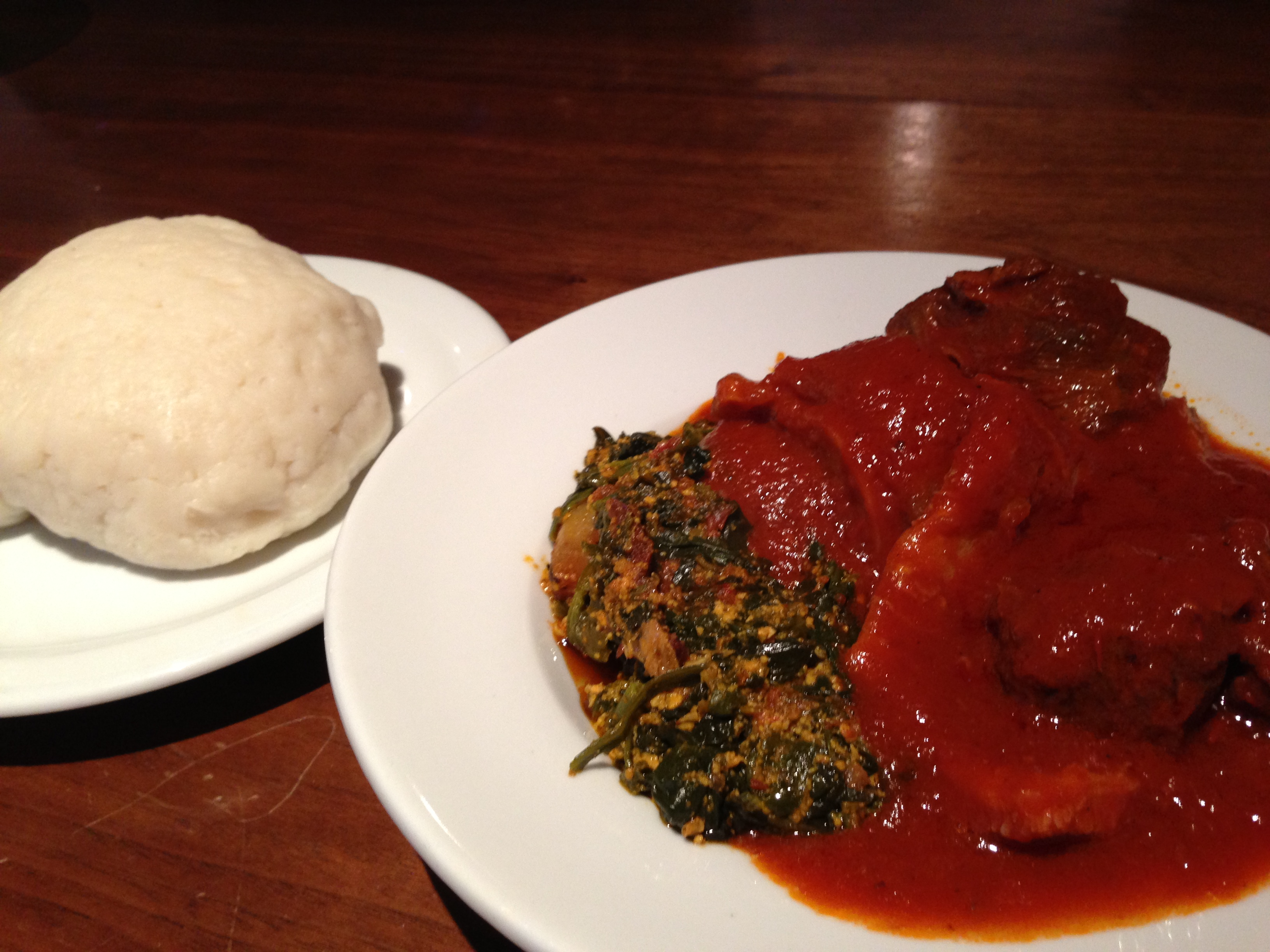
A plate of pounded yam (Utara ji) and egusi with tomato stew

- Pounded yam is similar to mashed potatoes but completely smooth with no yam chunks left. And eaten with soups.
- Amala is a thick paste made from yam, which has been peeled, cleaned, dried and dark (brown) in colour.
- Poundo is a processed yam flour used to make a type of Okele similar to pounded yam/Iyan.
- Asaro is a yam dish made by boiling and lightly mashing yam in rich chili, tomato and big red pepper sauce with palm oil. Vegetable oil is sometimes used in the absence of palm oil. It can be garnished with fish, meat or crayfish as desired. Leafy Vegetable can be added to it or skipped.
- Yam pottage is a local home-made meal popular in the southern parts of Nigeria. Method of preparation differs based on taste, preference and affordability. Yam pottage is considered a variety of one pot yam dishes featuring tomato, peppers, spices and palm oil or vegetable oil. Also yam pottage can refer to one pot yam and beans dishes.
- Ebiripo is most common amongst the Yoruba Remo people in South-West Nigeria. It is made by grating coco-yam to a paste, salt and groundnut oil is then added to taste and filled in leaves made into scoops before boiling, and usually eaten with soups like efo riro.
- Ikokore, also known as ifokore, is a popular Yoruba dish in the Ijebu areas of South-West Nigeria. It is similar to asaro in preparation but water yam (Dioscorea alata) is used instead of yam. The water yam (called isu ewura in Yoruba language) is grated and some bits left in ungrated and cooked with a mixture of pepper, palm oil, fish and condiments.
- Beans and yam. Beans is cooked with spices and palm oil and yam added towards the end of the dish
- Boiled yam and eggs or stew
- Roasted yam
- Dundun- Deep fried yam usually eaten with ata din din sauce
- Dundun Oniyeri / yamarita - Egg covered fried yam
- Fried yam. Yam is cut into smaller pieces and fried in vegetable oil. The yam can be pre-boiled before frying to have a different texture.

=== Cassava-based ===
- Eba, also called garri, is a very thick paste that is either rolled into balls or served like amala and made from cassava (manioc).
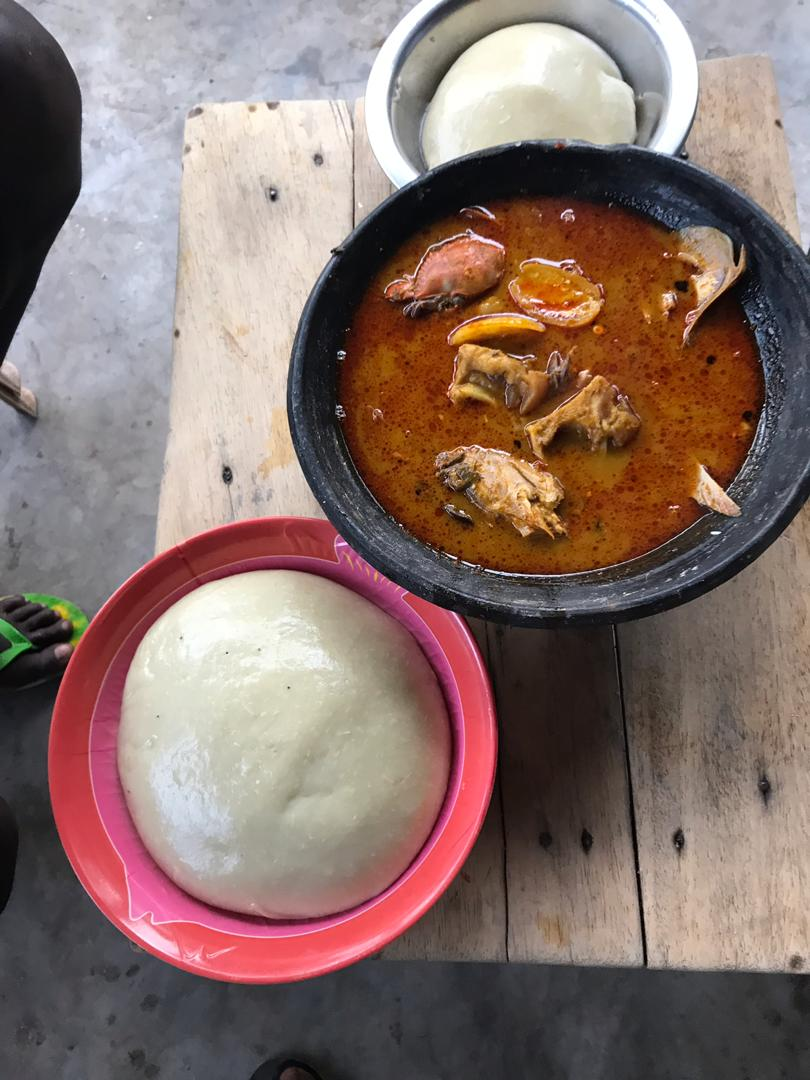
- fufu dish
  Fufu, a staple dish in Nigeria and most of West Africa.
- Lafun is basically like amala but much lighter in colour and made from cassava.

== Breakfast ==
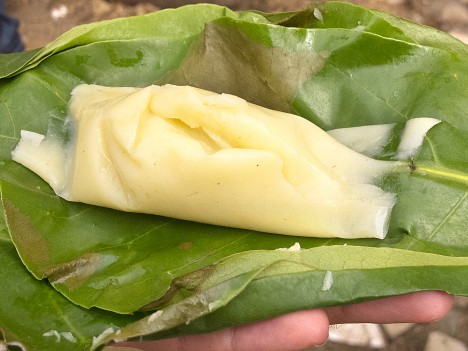
Agidi or Eko

- Masa originated from the north and is eaten both as lunch and breakfast. Rice is soaked and then ground. Yogurt is added, forming a thick paste, and left to ferment, or yeast and sugar is added to taste. Poured into clay forms and heated from below, a spatula is used to flip over and gouge the masa out of the form. It is traditionally served with miyan taushe (pumpkin stew) or honey.
- Sinasir is a flat masa, made by simply pouring the prepared rice paste into a frying pan, thus avoiding the need to flip it over as would be necessary with masa. This is a predominantly Hausa food.
- Alkubus is Hausa-Fulani steamed bread made from wheat, flour, yeast and water, put in moulds and steamed. It is served with miyan taushe.
- Yam with red stew or scrambled eggs with diced tomato and onion.
- Eko also known as agidi by the Yoruba speaking people of Southwest, is a popular breakfast meal in Nigeria. It is served in combination with other foods such as Akara (fried bean cake), beans, pepper soup, and other soups.
- Ogi or akamu is corn pudding common in Nigeria, called ogi by the Yoruba and akamu by the Igbo. Eaten with bread, akara or beans
- Egbo is a food made from corn.
- Mosa is a Yoruba food made from very ripe plantains or corn, eggs, peppers and spices

== Snacks ==
- Chin chin are fried cookie strips made from flour, eggs and butter.
- Puff-puff, fried sweet dough balls.
- Akara is a beignet from a batter based on black-eyed peas. It is sometimes served for breakfast.
- Alkaki (doughnuts) made from wheat and sugar paste.
- Kuli-kuli is a Nupe snack made from ground peanuts.
- Kokoro is a Yoruba fried dry snack made from corn and garri (cassava). There are two different kinds.
- Meat pie, beef and vegetables enclosed in a pastry case.
- Wara is a Yoruba soft cottage cheese made from fresh cow milk.
- Nigerian Egg roll
- Beske or awara is the local name for tofu amongst Yoruba-speaking people.
- Plantain chips are a crunchy, salty or sweet Nigerian snack made with either ripe or unripe plantains fried in vegetable oil.
- Coconut candy
- Aadun is made from cornflour, chilli pepper and palm oil
- Dundun is a Yoruba meal of roasted or deep-fried slices of yam. It may be fried in palm oil or vegetable oil; water is added to soften the yam as it cooks. Dundun is usually eaten with a sauce made of groundnut or palm oil, tomatoes, chili peppers and seasoning.
- Ojojo is a Yoruba beignet made from grated/ground water yam (Dioscorea alata). Peppers, onions and seasoning are mixed with the grated water yam before being deep-fried. Water yam is known as isu ewura in Southwest, Nigeria.

== Beverages ==
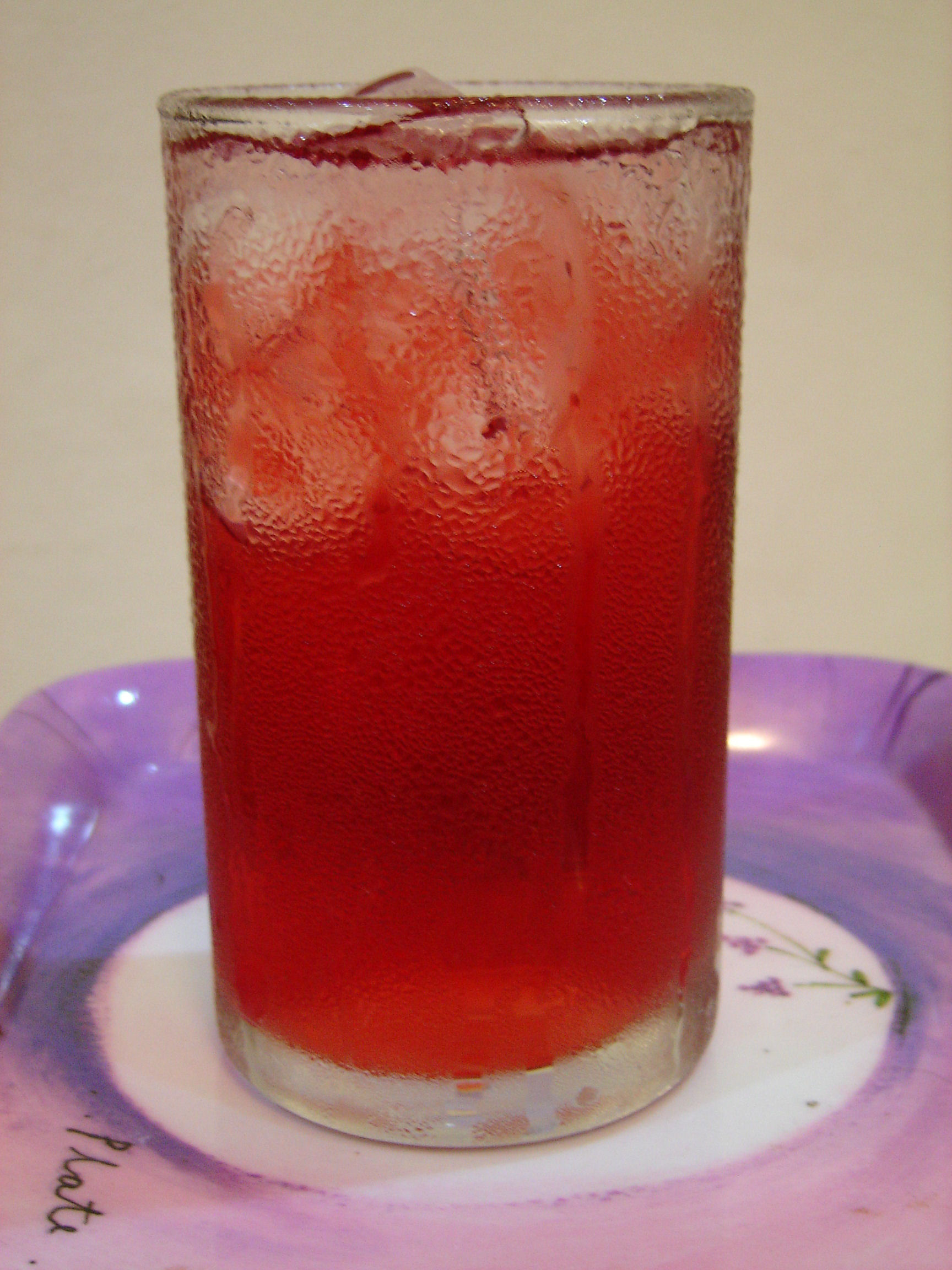
Zobo

- Kunu is a well-known drink made of either millet, sorghum or maize.
- Fura is a common drink, especially across northern Nigeria, made of cooked, then pounded, millet or sorghum with a little cow's milk.
- Palm wine, which may be distilled into ogogoro
- Zobo (hibiscus leaf) is a drink made of roselle juice (the Yorubas call the white variety isapa)
- Soya bean milk is a drink made from soaked, ground, and sieved soya bean.
- Shayi (masala chai) is a spiced black tea more popular in northern Nigeria. The introduction of this tea is typically attributed to the Kanuri, Tuareg and Shuwa Arab ethnic groups. The word 'shayi' comes from the Hausa language and means 'tea'.

== See also ==
- West African cuisine
- List of African cuisines
