= Hausa cuisine =

West African culinary tradition

Hausa cuisine is traditional and modern food prepared by Hausa people. It is based on the availability of raw food materials they can farm or import from other places. Hausa people often depend purely on the farm products they have cultivated for food preparation.

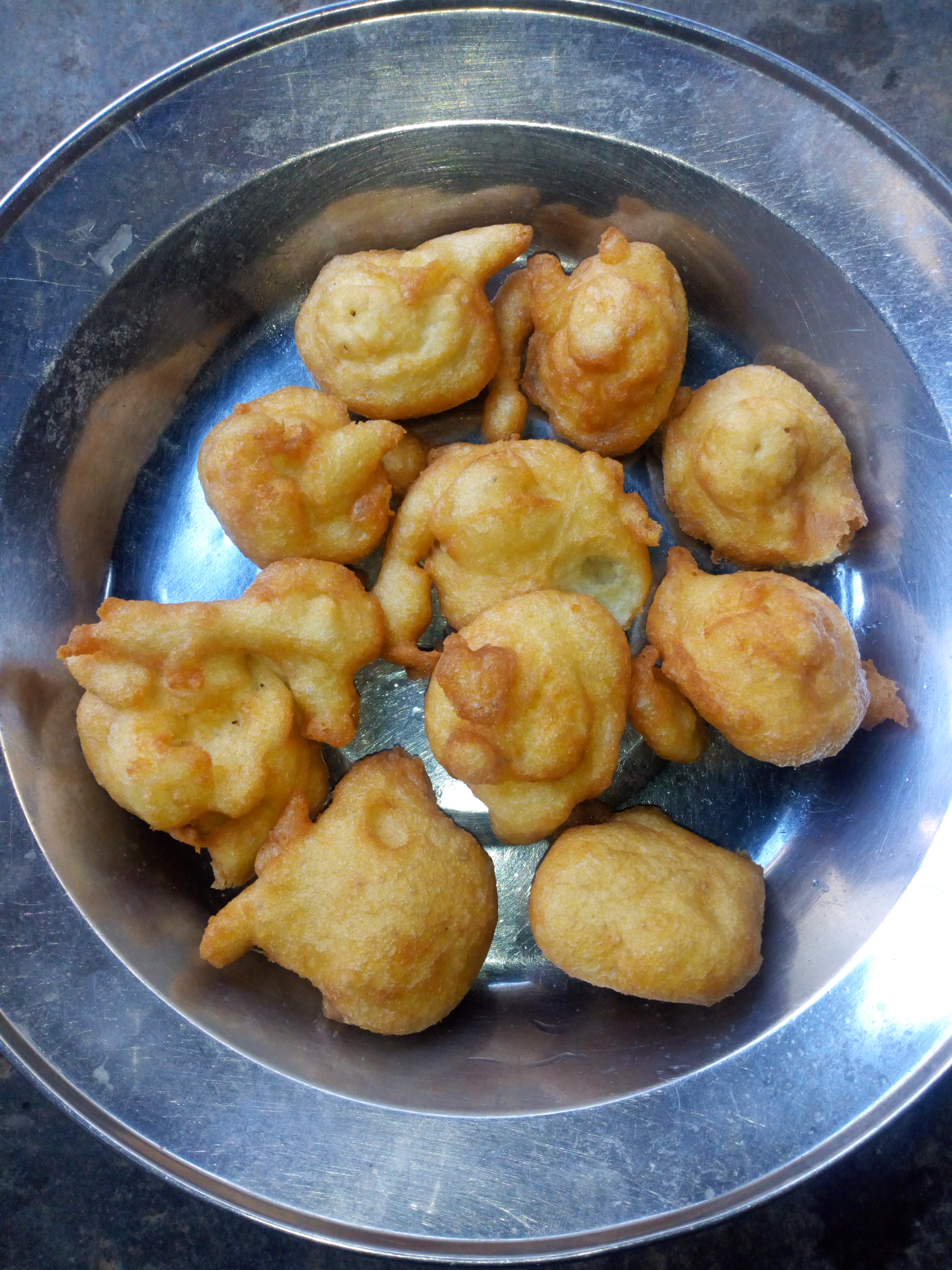
Kosai, a breakfast dish

== Breakfast ==
- Koko – A porridge made from millet, maize, guinea corn and tiger nut
- Kosai – A dish made from peeled beans formed into a ball and deep-fried in palm oil (from Yoruba: Akara)
- Kunu – A beverage made from millet
- Waina
- Coffee and bread – Although not a traditional breakfast item, these have become common in Hausa cuisine as a result of British colonization.

== Lunch ==
- Dambun shinkafa
- Dan wake – Bean dumplings, eaten with either palm or peanut oil
- Fate
- Taliya
- Shinkafa
- Olele

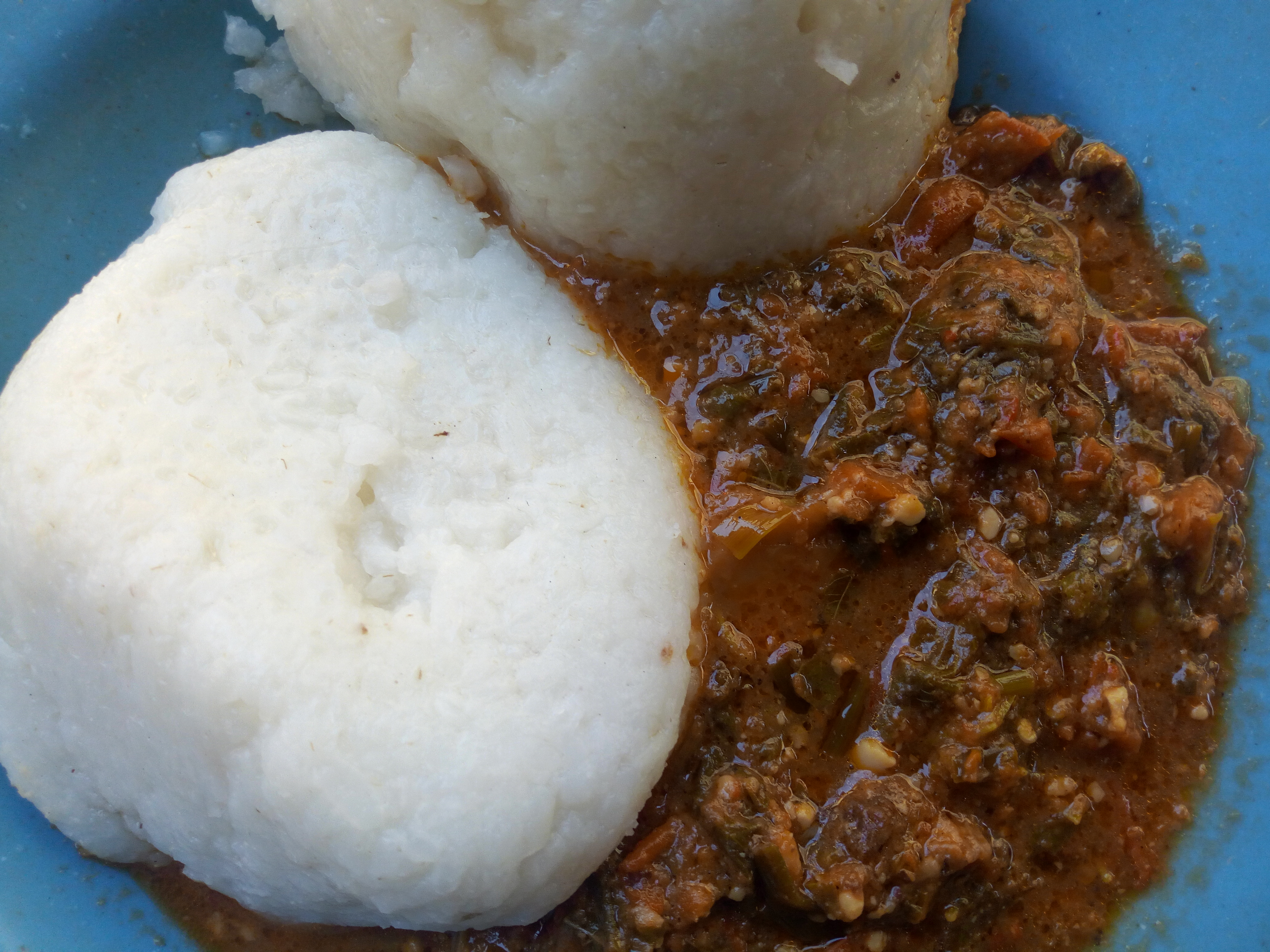
Tuwon shinkafa and miyan taushe

== Dinner ==
- Tuwon masara – A swallow made from maize, millet or guinea corn flour
- Tuwon shinkafa – A swallow made from rice
- Miyan kuka – A soup made from dried baobab leaves ground into powder
- Miyan taushe – A soup made from pumpkin
- Okra soup
- Funkaso
- Tuo zaafi

== Beverages and drinks ==
- Zobo – Hibiscus tea

== Snacks ==
- Kuli-kuli – A deep-fried snack made from ground peanuts and spices
- Masa – A type of rice cake that is typically served with a spicy sauce
- Kunun gyada – A sweetened peanut milk
- Dakuwa – A sweet snack made from crushed peanuts and sugar
- Fanke

== Gallery ==
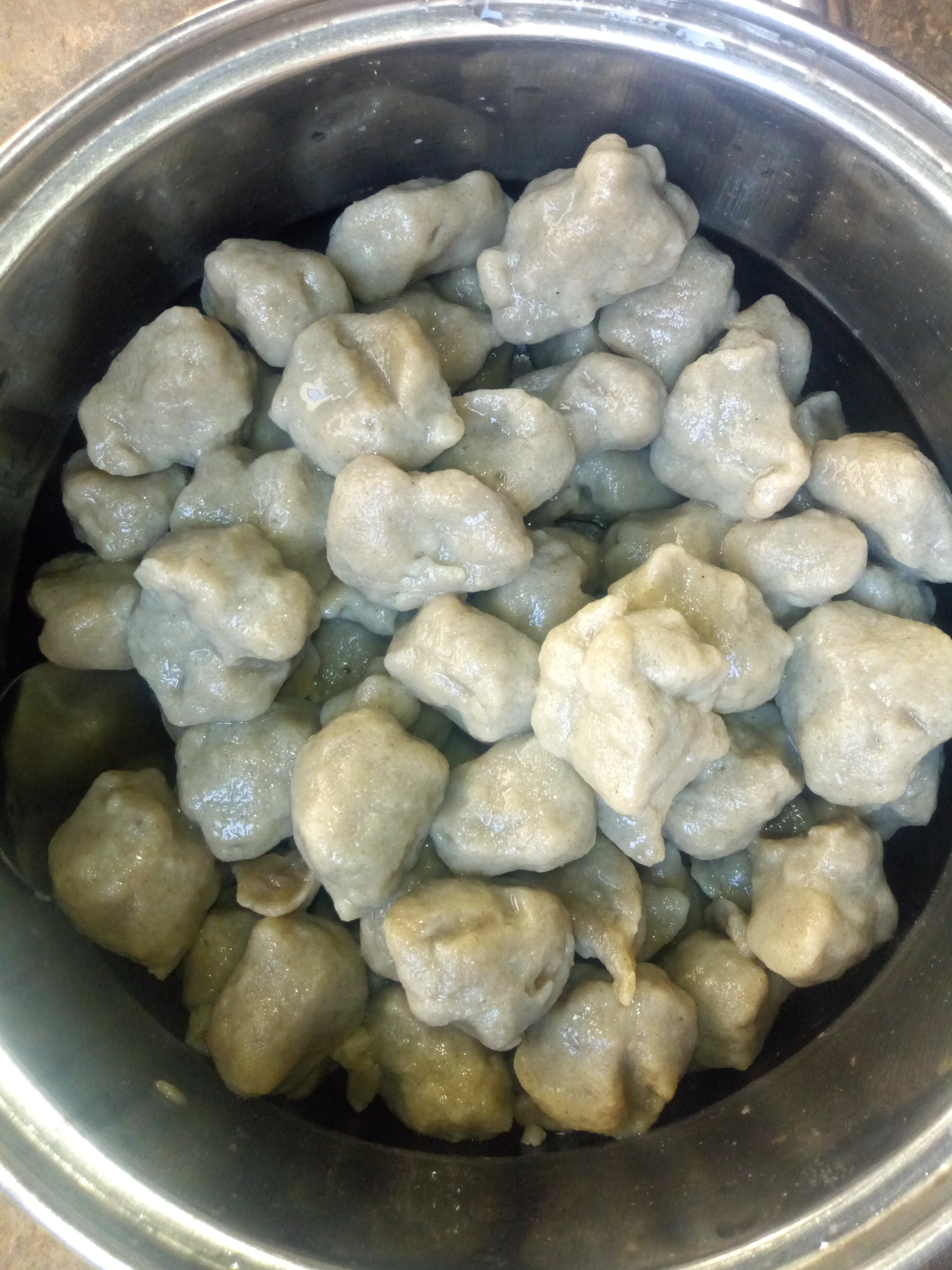
Dan wake made from bean

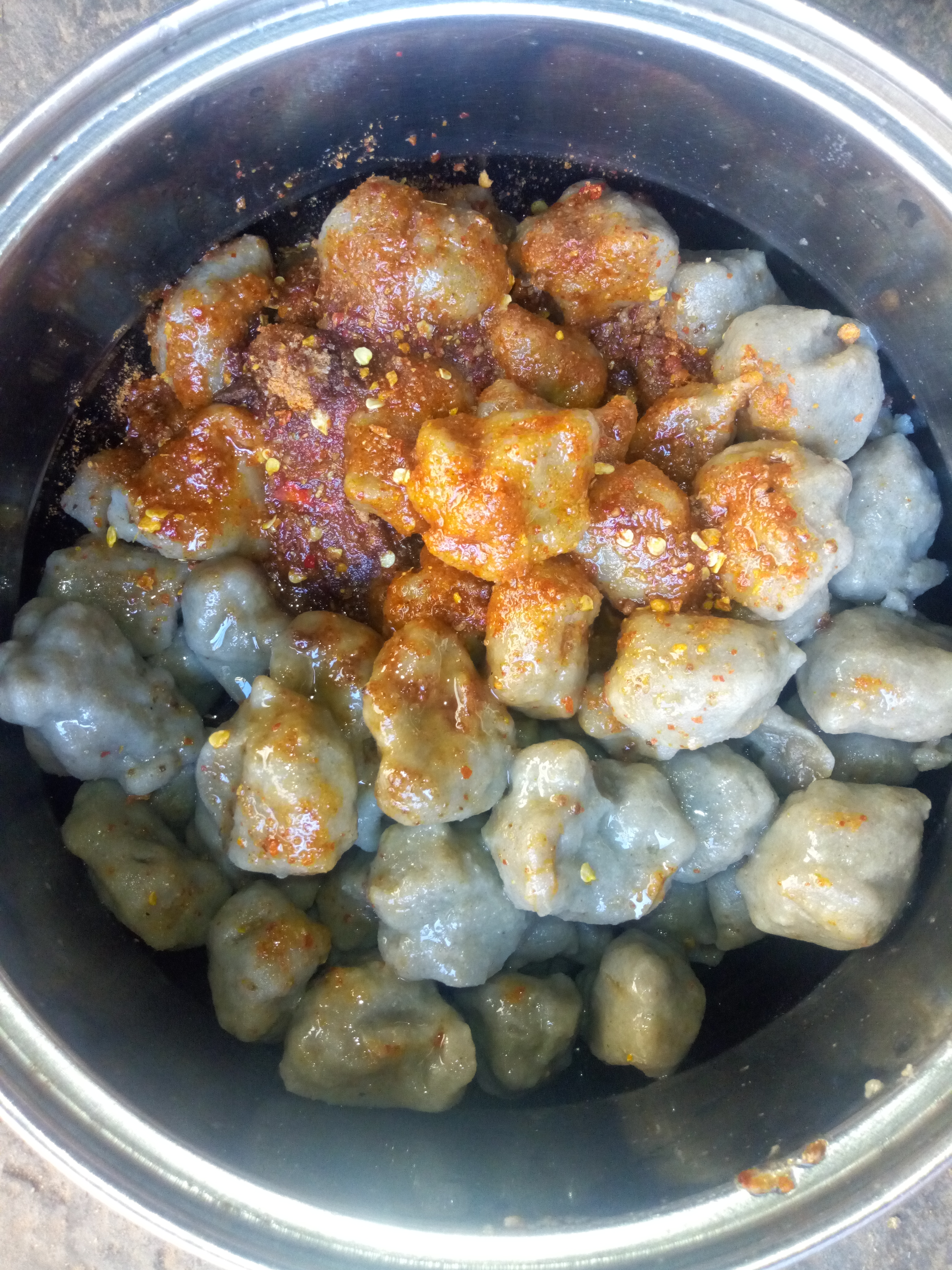
Dan wake with groundnut oil and pepper

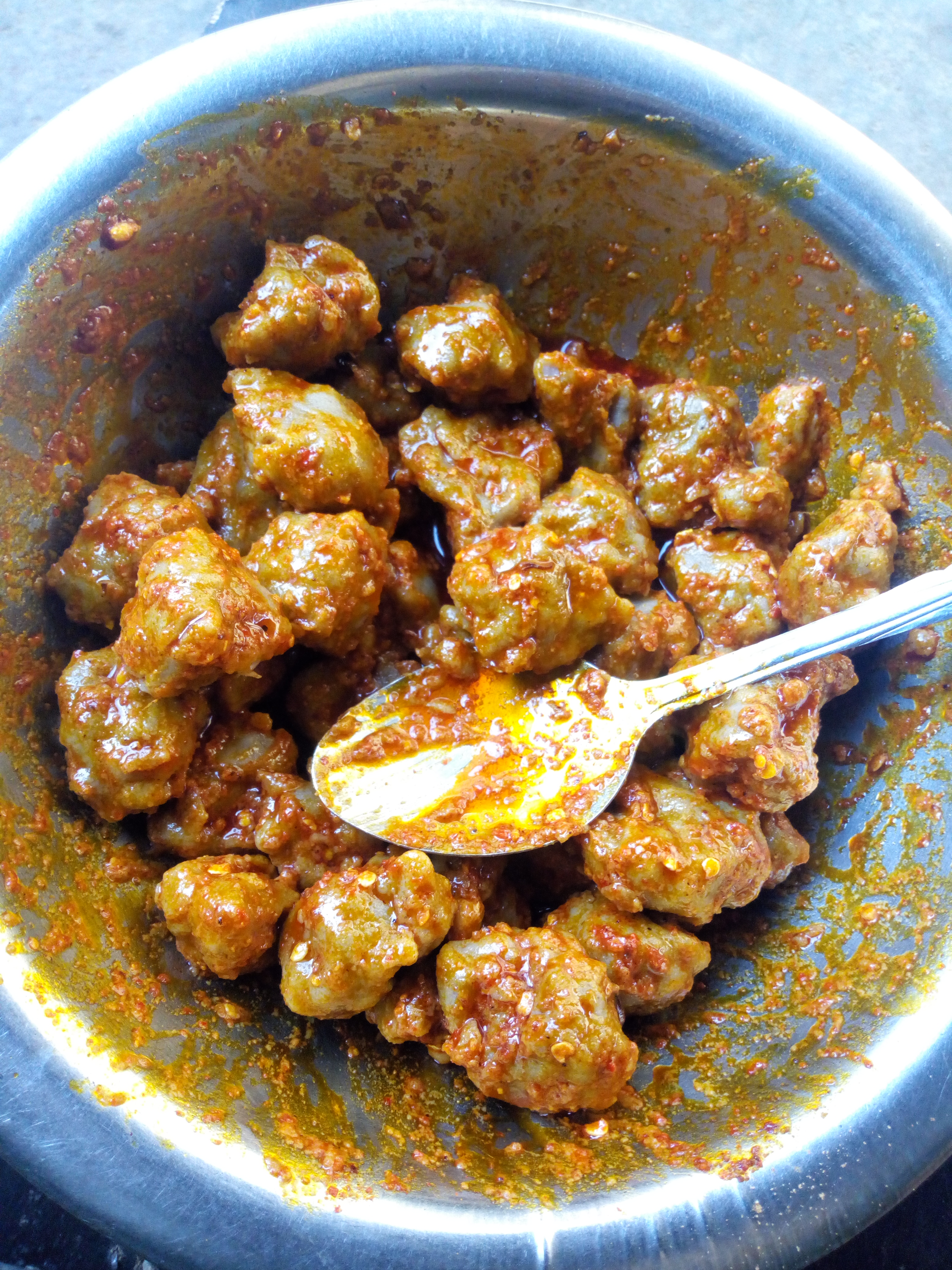
Dan wake with palm oil and pepper

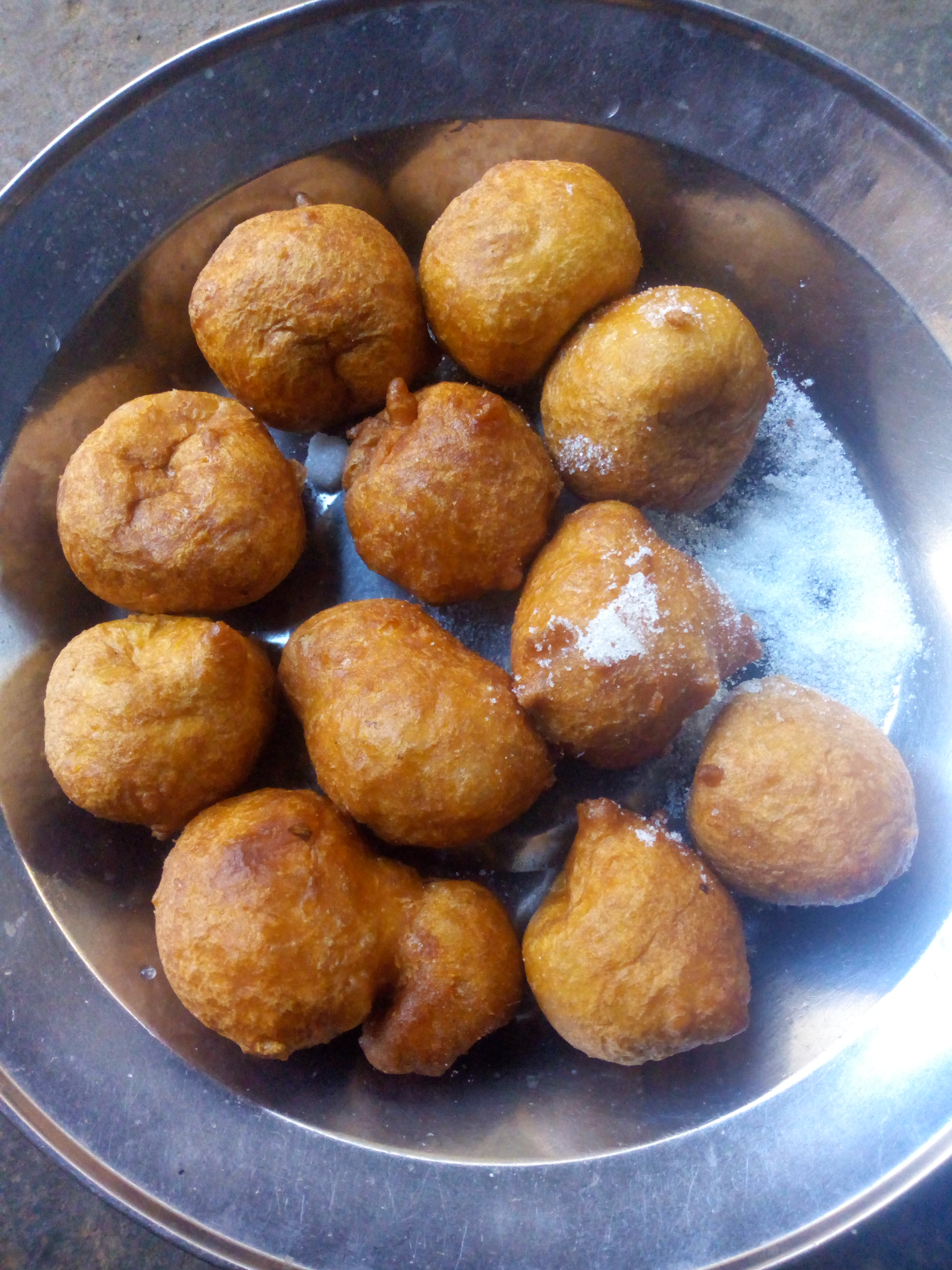
Fanke made from wheat flour

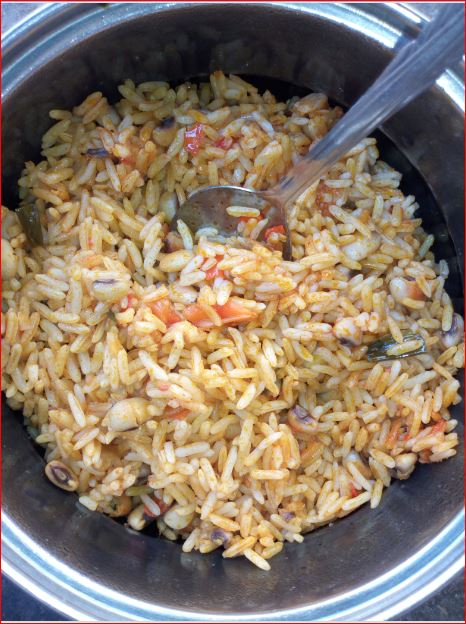
Jollof rice and beans

== See also ==
- Eritrean cuisine
- Ethiopian cuisine
- Somali cuisine
