= Alkaki =

Nigerian sanck

- Type: Doughnut
- Course: Snack
- Place of origin: Nigeria
- Region or state: Northern Nigeria
- Main ingredients: Wheat, yeast, sugar, salt, Honey, water, vegetable oil
- Other information: it's also consumed in Niger, Mali, Cameroun and some other west African countries.

Alkaki is a Hausa doughnut made with wheat and sugar paste or honey, it usually found in Hausa people royal houses and bride houses. Alkaki is a snack originating from Northern Nigeria, known for its pronounced sweetness. This sweetness is achieved by soaking the snack in honey, sugar, or lemon syrup, which imparts moisture to it as it gets absorbed. Alkaki is a well-known choice for both parties and street food.

== See also ==
- Funkaso
- Sinasir
- Hausa cuisine
- Hausa people
