= Eka soup =

Food made of palm kernel and groundnut in Nigeria

Eka soup, also known as ekuku, is a delicacy of three tribes in the Eastern region of Nigeria. It is prepared from mashed palm kernel, roasted groundnut and benne seeds. Eka soup is commonly eaten with starchy foods such as fufu. Eka Soup (Beniseed soup) is a popular dish among the Idomas of Benue State, the Ogojas in Cross River and the Ibirams of Kogi state.

== History ==
The soup is common among the people in Benue, Kogi and Cross River State. Beniseed soup is known as ishwa soup by the Tiv tribe, while Hausa refer to the soup as ridi.

== Similar soups ==
Other soups made from nuts and seeds include:

- Banga soup - delicacy of Urhobo people made from palm kernel, it is best eaten with starchy foods.
- Egusi soup - soup made from melon seeds and leaves
- Ogbono soup - cracked bush mango seeds, it is a draw soup eaten with eba, Amala.

== Other foods ==
Eka soup is often eaten with Eba, pounded yam and fufu.

== See also ==
- Nigerian cuisine
