= Tuwon masara =

Hausa maize flour meal food

- Alternative names: Tuwon Masara
- Type: Tuwo, swallow
- Place of origin: Nigeria
- Region or state: Northern Nigeria
- Main ingredients: Maize, corn
- Variations: Tuwo Zaafi
- Other information: also eaten in Niger, Mali, Cameroon, and some other west African countries.

Tuwon masara is a Nigerian corn flour swallow eaten primarily by the Hausa and Fulani that resembles fufu. It has several alternative names. This meal is not only common in the northern parts of Nigeria, it is well known around the world, it is just cooked in different ways depending on the country.

== Similar foods ==
Tuwon masara is not limited to Nigeria. Tuwon masara is similar to sadza, a popular Southern African food. In Ghana, tuwon masara is called and eaten as tuwo zafi. It is a popular food in northern Nigeria.

== Method of preparation ==
a video about the formation of Tuwon Masara from corn

There are different methods of making tuwon mansara. After the corn has been grounded, it can be poured directly into a pot of boiling water while stirring continuously to create a dough-like mush.

Another method is by mixing the cornflour into a thick paste and then pouring it into a pot of boiling water to make a smooth dough-like mush.

Once it is done, it can be served with any soup of your choice. In Northern Nigeria, it's commonly served with miyan taushe, miyan zogale, miyan ridi, miyan wake, miyan shuaka, miyan kuka, or miyan tapa. Other soups that go well with tuwon mansara are egusi soup and ogbono soup and Gbegiri soup.

== See also ==
- Tuwon shinkafa
- Dambu shinkafa
- Hausa cuisine
- Hausa people
