= Ofe Ujuju =

Igbo soup

- Type: Traditional Nigerian Tribe
- Place of origin: South South
- Region or state: Ika
- Serving temperature: Warm
- Main ingredients: Uju leaves; Dry pepper; Palm oil

Ofe Ujuju is a local dish from Ika people of the Niger Delta part of Nigeria. The soup is popular among the Ika and Agbor people of Delta State.

The soup is made with ujuju leaves (Myrianthus arboreus), commonly known as ("monkey fruit"), meats, fish, black pepper and seasoning cubes.

It is served with eba, akpu, Semovita (a glutinous flour derived from semolina wheat), and pounded yam.

== Overview ==
The comprehensive ingredients used in preparation are bush meat, smoked fish, a bunch of ujuju leaves, ground dried pepper, palm oil, seasoning cubes, water, and salt to taste. Once prepared, it can also be served with boiled white rice other than pounded yam and eba.

Ofe Ujuju has a distinct texture and flavor, making it a culturally significant dish among the Ika people. Depending on individual preferences, it can also be prepared in combination with ogbono or other soups to create different variations.
