= Yam pepper soup =

Nigerian soup

Yam pepper soup is a Nigerian dish made using soft white puna yam. It is necessary for the yam to be soft.

The soup is common amongst the South-Eastern part of Nigeria and some of the ingredients required to make it are ehuru, chili pepper, varieties of meat, salt and scent leaf.

These ingredients are added when the yam is soft such that it start to form porridge.

== Other foods ==
Plantain and rice are served with yam pepper soup.

== See also ==
- Igbo cuisine
- Ogbono soup
- Nigerian cuisine
- Peanut soup
