= Edo black soup =

Nigerian soup

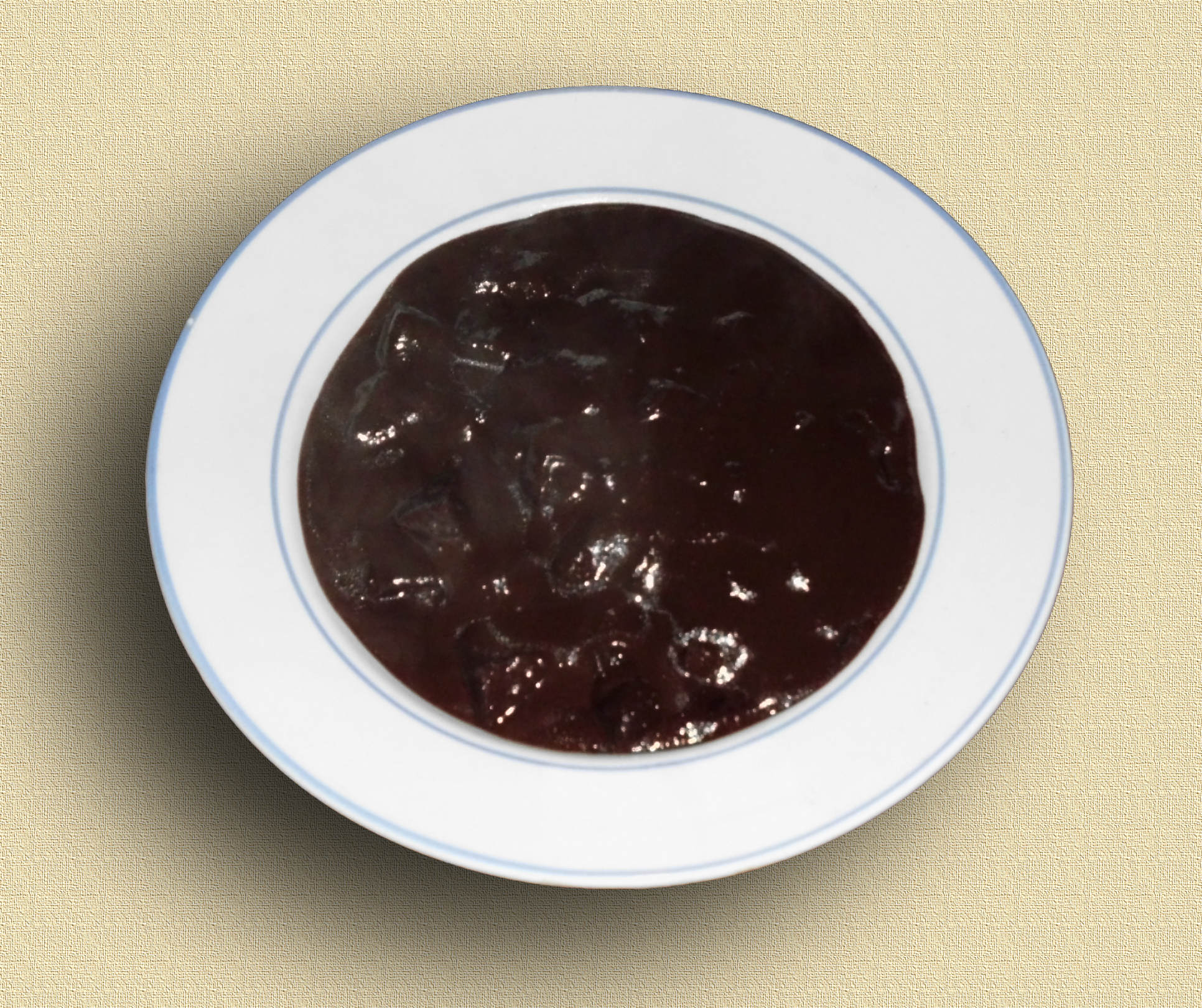
Edo black soup

Edo black soup, also known as omoebe, is a Nigerian soup made mainly from scent leaf, uziza leaf, and bitter leaf. Other ingredients include beef, onion, crayfish powder, pepper, and palm oil.

== Origin ==
The soup is popular in the state of Edo, although it's eaten across Nigeria.

== Overview ==
First, the meat is boiled alongside onions and is seasoned using seasoning cubes and salt. While boiling, uziza leaf and scent leaf are blended together, with the bitter leaf blended separately.

Palm oil and meat stock are added into the pot, along with ground pepper, crayfish powder, onion, and the blended leaves. It's then allowed to cook for 2–3 minutes before additional spices are added to taste.

== Other foods ==
Black soup is eaten with fufu, Eba, pounded yam, and Semovita.

== See also ==
- Nigeria cuisine
