= Ofe Owerri =

Igbo soup

- Type: Soup
- Place of origin: Southeast Nigeria (Igboland)
- Region or state: South East
- Serving temperature: Warm
- Main ingredients: Ukazi leaves Gnetum africanum; Ugu Pumpkin Leaves
- Ingredients generally used: Uziza leaves Piper guineense

Ofe Owerri is an Igbo delicacy in the South-Eastern part of Nigeria. The soup is made with snails, beef, assorted meat and fishes.

== Origin ==
The soup is popular among people living in the capital of Imo state, Owerri.

== Overview ==
The soup is one of the most expensive Igbo soups, which is why it has been nicknamed 'Jewel of South East'.

Varieties of vegetables such as okazi and uziza leaf are used in its preparation. Ugu can serve as an alternative to uziza when it is not readily available. Other ingredients include different types of fish, meats, and crayfish. Ofe Owerri is cooked with palm oil, and ede also known red cocoyam is used to thicken the soup.

Ofe Owerri is often eaten with akpụ, pounded yam (utara ji), semolina and garri (utara akpụ).

== Health benefits ==
Ofe Owerri is prepared with a variety of protein sources such as beef, cow skin, snails, and fish. These proteins provide essential amino acids needed for muscle repair, growth, and overall body function.

The soup is traditionally thickened with red cocoyam, which contains fiber, vitamins, and minerals that support digestion and provide energy. The vegetables used in the soup are rich in vitamins A and C, iron, and antioxidants, all of which contribute to immune health, healthy skin, and overall well-being.

== See also ==
- Nigeria cuisine
- Owerri
- ONGAcious
