= Sinasir =

Nigerian food

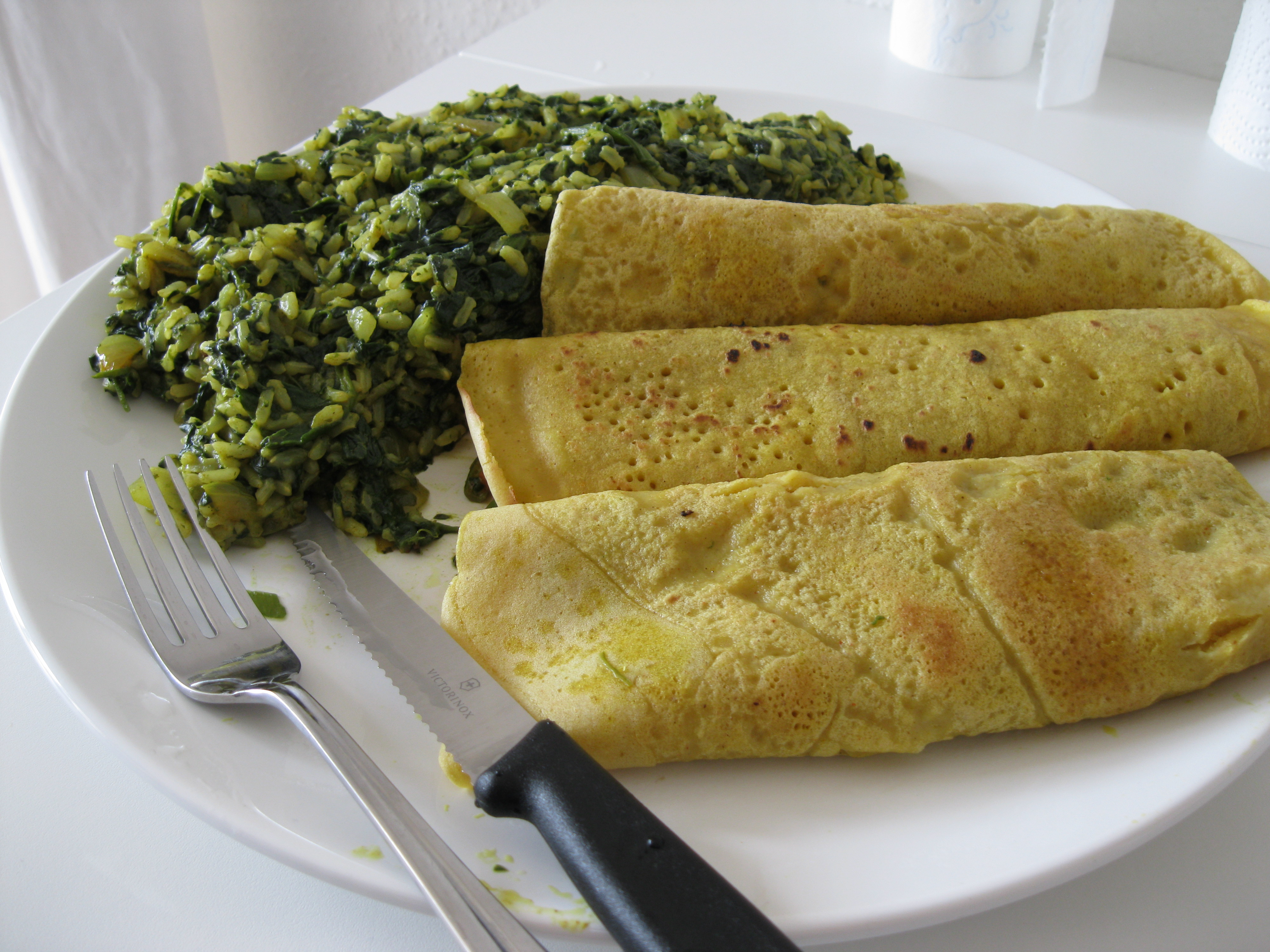
Sinasir

Sinasir is a Nigerian delicacy made from rice popular amongst the northern region. The type of rice used are of two types: Cooked and soaked rice.

The rice meal is prepared by blending cooked and soaked rice which are blended and fried. Other ingredients used include sugar, salt, milk, egg, onion, and vegetable oil.

Sinasir is one of the many sweet recipes in the northern part of Nigeria. It is made with a short-grain rice of the same type used to make tuwon shinkafa.

== See also ==
- Nigerian cuisine
