= Pate acha =

Northern Nigerian dish

- Type: Soup
- Place of origin: Nigeria
- Region or state: Northern Nigeria

Pate acha also called pete acha, tere, gote or gwete is a Nigerian dish from the northern part of Nigeria. It is made from ground corn, rice or acha.

== See also ==
- Nigerian cuisine
