= Otong soup =

Efik Soup

Otong soup is a Nigerian soup made in the South Eastern region. It is popular among the Efik tribe of the Cross River state. Similar soups are Ila alasepo of Yoruba and 'okwuru' of the Igbo tribe.

Three vegetables used in preparing the soup, which are ikong Ubong (Ugu leaves), Uziza leaves and Okra. Assorted meats, fishes, crayfish, bonnet pepper, onion and palm oil are used in cooking this Efik soup.

== Other foods ==
The soup is served with Ayan Ekpang, fufu, Eba and Pounded yam.

== See also ==
- Oron people
- Efik people
- Balondo Civilization
