= Egbo (food) =

Meal ground from dried corn

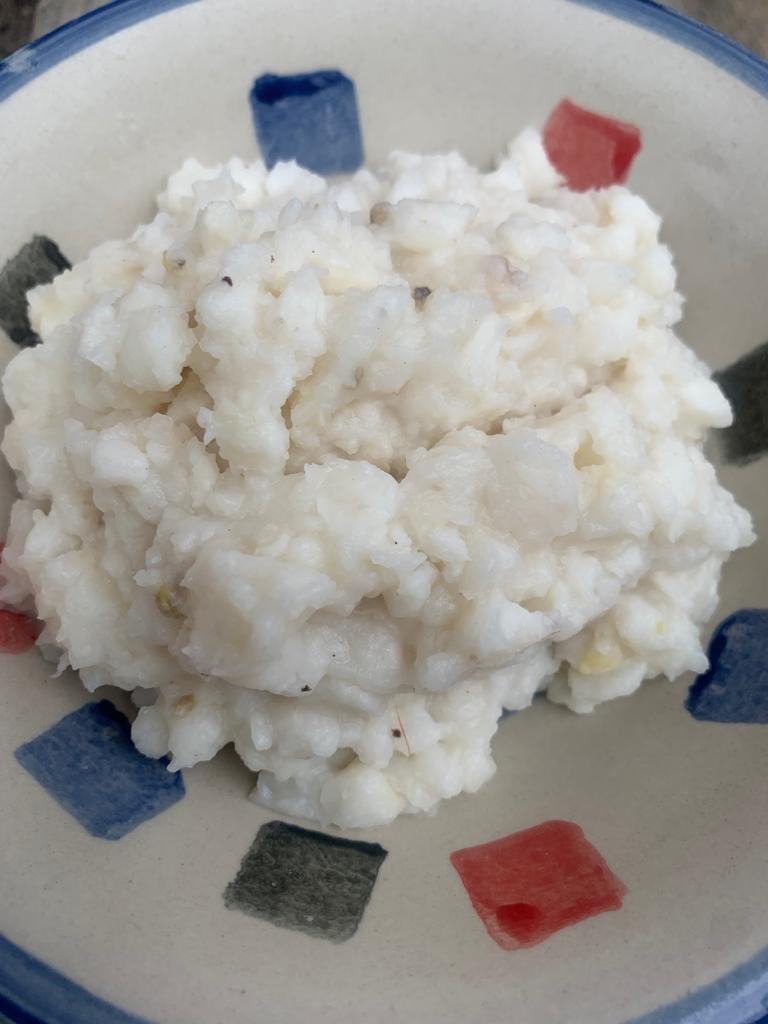
Egbo, a Nigerian local food

Egbo is a popular Yoruba dish, especially among the people from Ibadan. The food is made from dry corn which is cooked until soft. Also known as corn porridge, egbo is similar to oatmeal. When eaten with sauce, beans and vegetables it is known as ororo robo.

== See also ==
- Nigerian cuisine
- List of maize dishes
