= Miyan taushe =

Hausa soup

Miyan taushe is a soup made from groundnuts, it is commonly eaten by Hausa tribe in the northern part of Nigeria. The soup is mostly prepared with yakuwa leaf, dawadawa (locust beans), crayfish, meat, onions, and spices. It is known for its rich, slightly sweet pumpkin flavor and creamy texture from the groundnut paste.

It is native and popular with the Hausa and Fulani tribes of northern Nigeria. It is eaten with the necessary starch (tuwon shinkafa, tuwon masara, tuwon alkama, fufu, rice, naan, and other northern Nigerian dishes). These starches are usually made from high-starch carbohydrates like rice, yams, cassavas/yoca, plantains and many others which are collectively given the term "fufu", "okele", or swallow. because of how these foods used to be eaten by wrapping a small piece of the starch ball in soup using the hands and swallowing with minimal chewing.

== Ingredients ==
- Pumpkin
- Meat, fish (dried or fried), or both
- Groundnut paste (peanut paste)
- Onion
- Tomatoes
- Red bell pepper
- Hot pepper
- Fermented Africa locust beans)
- Palm oil or groundnut oil
- Seasoning cubes
- Salt
- Water
- Spinach, sorrel leaves, or other leafy vegetables
- Crayfish (optional)
- Ginger and garlic paste (optional)

== See also ==
- Hausa cuisine
- Nigerian cuisine
- Tuwon shinkafa
