= Palm nut =

Palm nut can refer to:

- The fruit of the oil palm (Elaeis) tree
- The fruit or seed of any palm tree (Arecaceae)
- The immature fruits of Arenga pinnata, a canned/bottled food sold commercially in syrup
