= Zowey =

West African snack

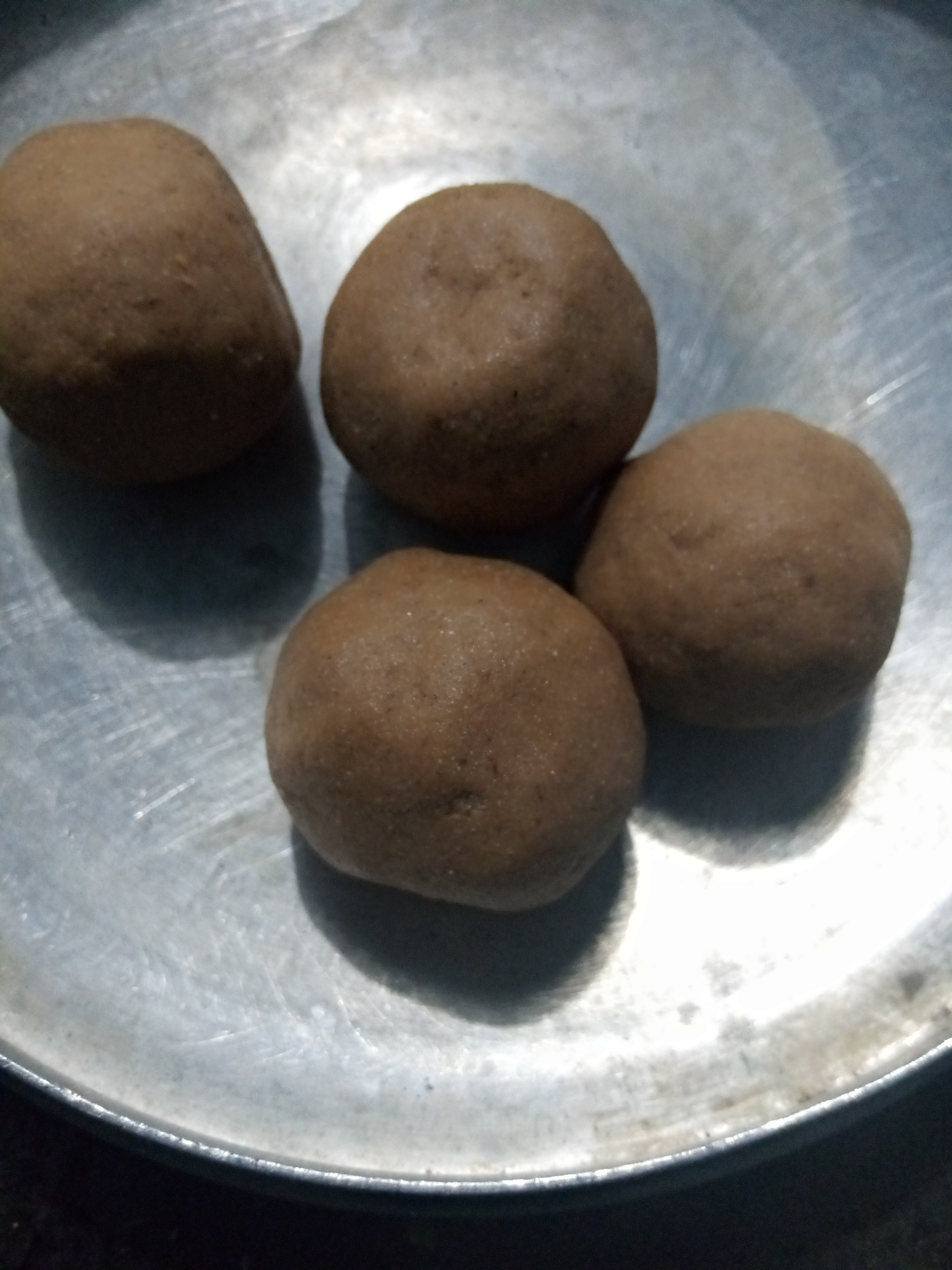
- A picture of finished Zowey on a plate
- Alternative names: Dzowey,Dakuwa,Donkwa,Adarkwa
- Course: Snack
- Place of origin: Ghana
- Created by: Hausa people
- Serving temperature: Hot or Cold
- Main ingredients: Water, Peanut Paste, Peanut Pieces, Ginger, Salt, Sugar, Powdered Pepper

Zowey, also known as Dzowey, Dakuwa, Donkwa or Adarkwa, is a West African snack combining peanut paste, sugar, salt, water, ginger, and powdered maize flour.

== Origin ==
Zowey is a common snack among the Hausa and Ewe people, as well as others living in Ghana, Togo, Benin and Nigeria. The name Zowey, or Dzowey comes from the Ewe word "dzowor" meaning "spicy powder" in English. In Nigeria, Zowey is known as Donkwa, the Hausa language name for the snack.

== Ingredients ==
The base ingredients are peanut paste, sugar, and ginger. The ingredients in a typical Zowey recipe are:

- Water
- Peanut Paste
- Peanut Pieces
- Sugar
- Salt
- Maize Flour
- Ginger
- Powdered Pepper
- Water

== Preparation ==
Zowey is typically prepared by mixing the base ingredients first, either by hand or with a mixer, and then adding powdered maize flour and peanut paste. After the contents are thoroughly mixed, the paste is shaped into round balls by hand.
