= Snail pepper soup =

Nigerian soup

Snail pepper soup is a local side-dish of the South-eastern region of Nigeria. It is prepared with Africa giant snail is the main ingredient. The soup is popular in the Niger Delta and with people from the upper region of Cross River State.

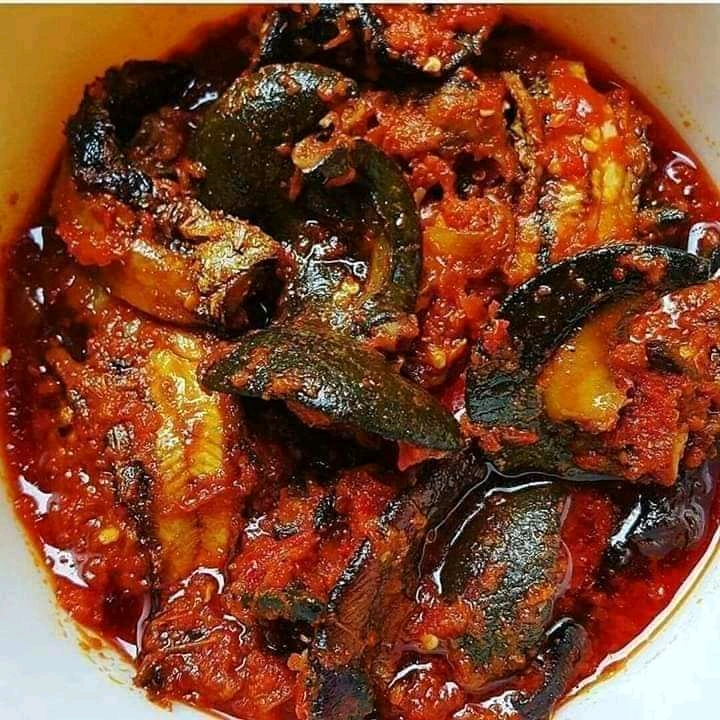
A plate of fried snail stew

== Overview ==
The slime is removed from the snail using lime, salt, Garri or Alum. Other ingredients include pepper, uziza powder, scent leaf, ehuru and Utazi leaf. The soup is expensive during dry season since snail aestivate while they are abundant in the rainy season. Cooked snail is preserved by smoking or sun-drying since the shelf-life is short.

== Other foods ==
Snail pepper soup is eaten with rice or maize pudding. It can also be eaten as a food supplemented with drinks.

== See also ==
- Frejon
- Palm nut soup
