= Tuwon shinkafa =

African rice pudding balls

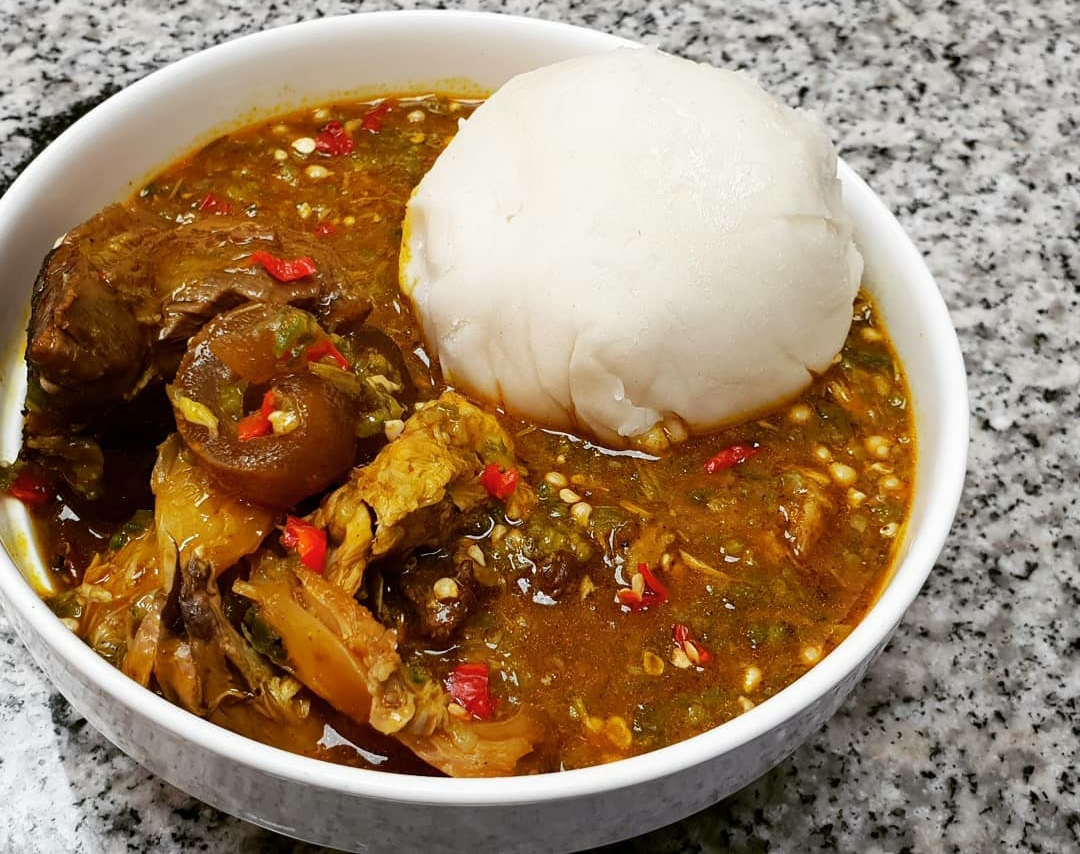
- Tuwon shinkafa
- Type: Swallow
- Place of origin: Nigeria and Niger
- Region or state: most of Niger and northern Nigeria
- Associated cuisine: Nigerian cuisine
- Serving temperature: Hot, usually rolled up in spherical form
- Main ingredients: Mashed rice, water

Tuwon shinkafa is a type of Nigerian and Nigerien rice swallow from Niger and the northern part of Nigeria.

It is a thick pudding prepared from local rice that is soft and sticky, and is usually served with different types of soups like miyan kuka and miyan taushe. Two variants made from maize and sorghum flour are called tuwon masara and tuwon dawa (made with sorghum), respectively. In Ghana, tuwon shinkafa is called omo tuo(Akan) or mɔlukple(Ewe).

== See also ==
- Nigerian cuisine
