= Okra soup =

Soup prepared with okra

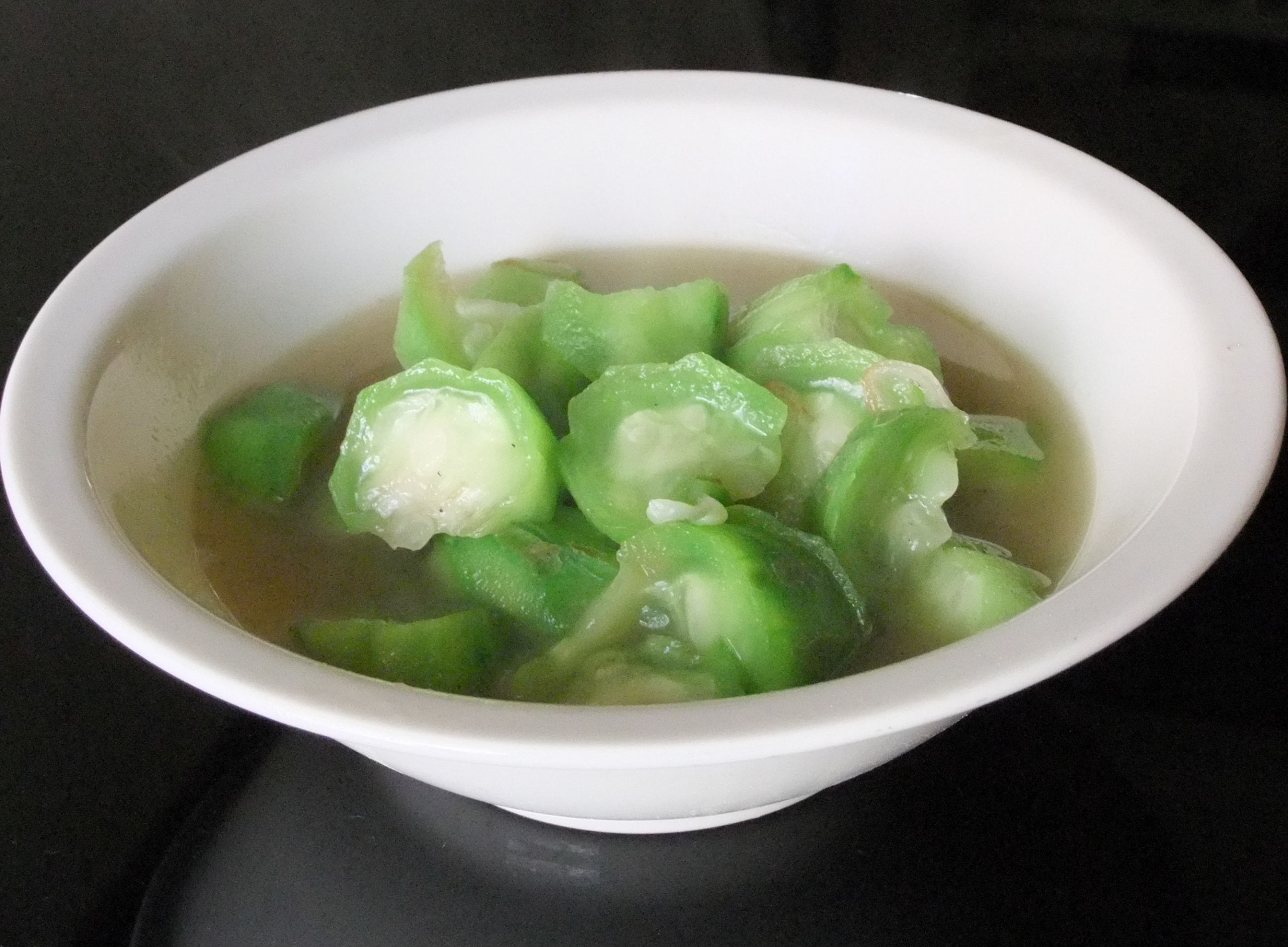
Indonesian sayur oyong (okra soup) in clear light broth

Okra or Okro is a soup made from the pods of the Okra plant, cooked in a wide variety of ways across several cultures and continents. As a term, the word 'Okra' (English) said to be borrowed from Igbo, is believed to have originated from a West African language in the Americas, from the Igbo people of Nigeria — "Ọkwụrụ/Ọ́kụ̀rụ̀.".

The soup is prepared using the edible green seed pods of the okra flowering plant as a primary ingredient. Other vegetables can be added to the soup as well, such as Jute leaf or Ugu leaf. Depending on the specific variant being prepared, okra soup can have a clear broth or be deep green in colour, much like the okra plant itself. Okra (and, by extension, okra soup) can have a slippery or "slimy" mouthfeel. The edible green seed pods can also be used in other stews and soups, such as the American dish gumbo.

== Africa ==
=== Nigeria ===
In Nigeria, okra soup is a delicacy and is popular amongst Igbos, Yorubas, Efiks, Hausas, and other Nigerian ethnic groups. In Yoruba, it is referred to as Ọbẹ ila and Miyan Kubewa in Hausa .

=== Ghana ===
In the 1881 publication A Dictionary of the Asante and Fante Language Called Tshi (Chwee, Tw̌i), two types of soups are noted to be made from parts of the Okra plant (Ṅkuruma), Nkruma-fan from its young leaves and Nkruma-nkwaṅ, from its pods. Tuo Zaafi, popularly called TZ is often served with dry Okra soup.

== Asia ==
=== China ===
Chinese okra soup is a "country style dish often served at family meals". Chinese okra differs significantly from the varieties of okra commonly available in the West.

=== Indonesia ===
In Indonesian cuisine, okra soup is called sayur oyong. It is usually served in clear chicken broth with rice vermicelli (bihun) or mung bean vermicelli (sohun), with slices of bakso (ground beef surimi).

=== Japan ===
In Japanese cuisine, okra and nagaimo are usually used as an addition or variation to miso soup.

== Americas ==
=== United States ===
In the United States, the first recipe for okra soup was published in 1824 in the book The Virginia Housewife. After this initial publication, okra soup was commonly included in American cookbooks. In the late 1800s, okra soup recipes were commonly published in The New York Times. American okra soup can be prepared using canned, frozen, or fresh okra. It is a traditional soup in Savannah, Georgia and Charleston, South Carolina.

== Gallery ==
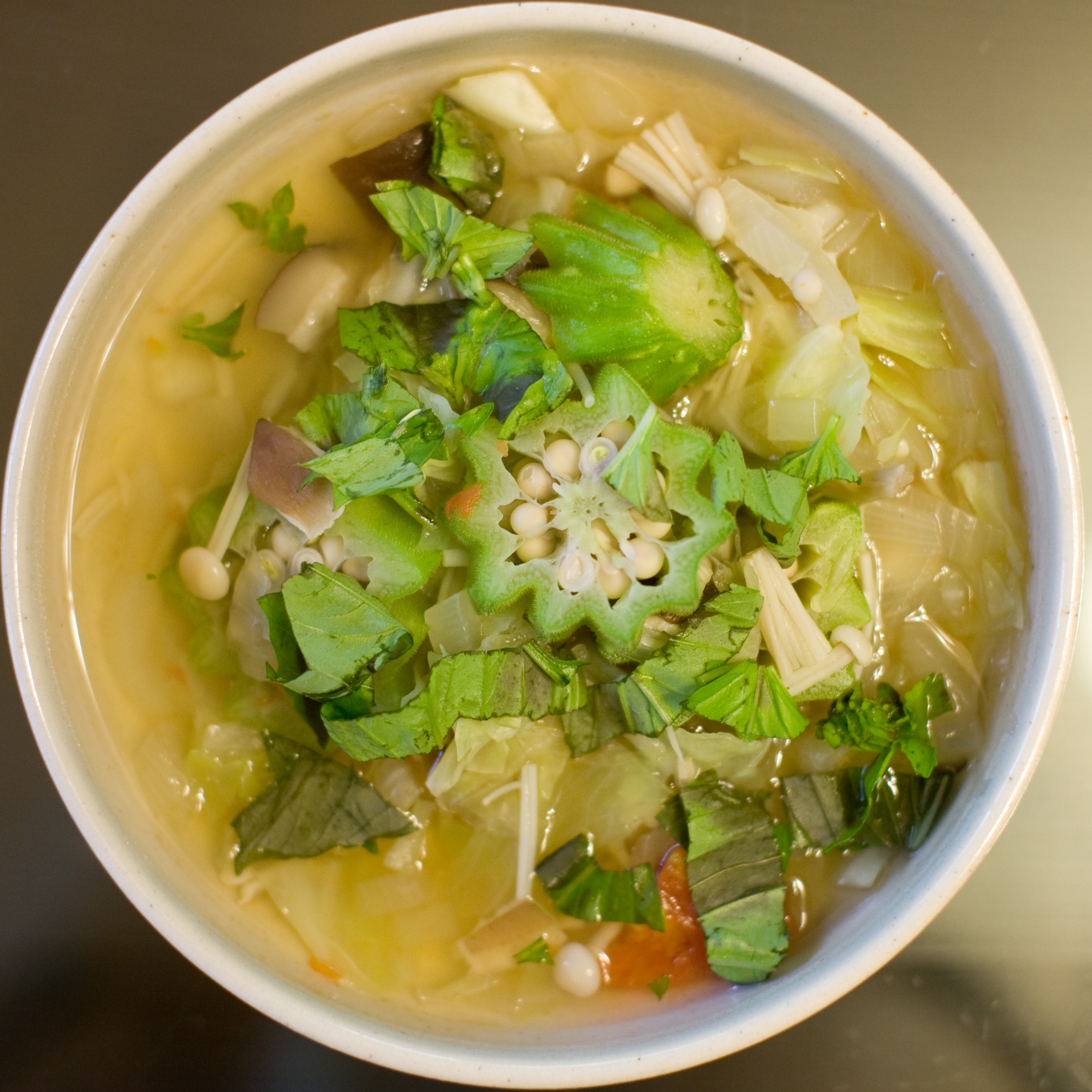
okra - Soup

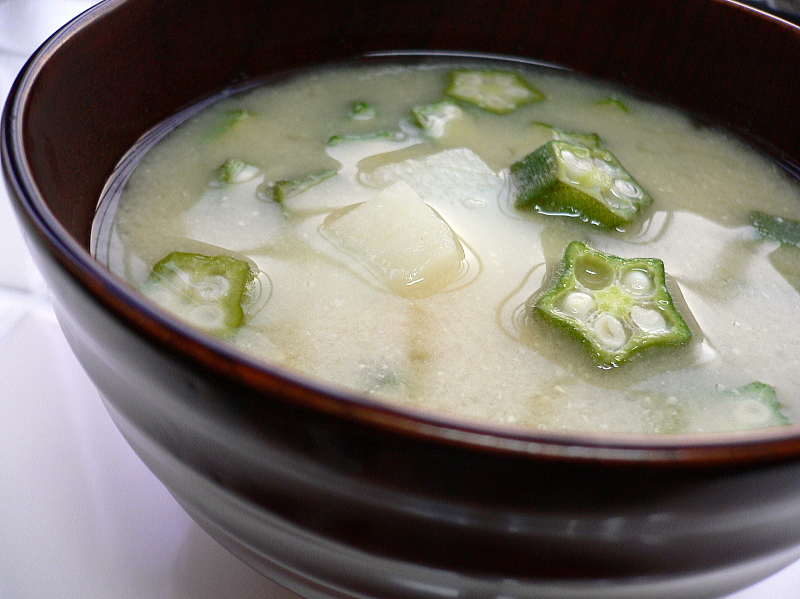
Miso soup with okra and nagaimo

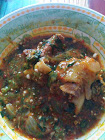
Okro Soup

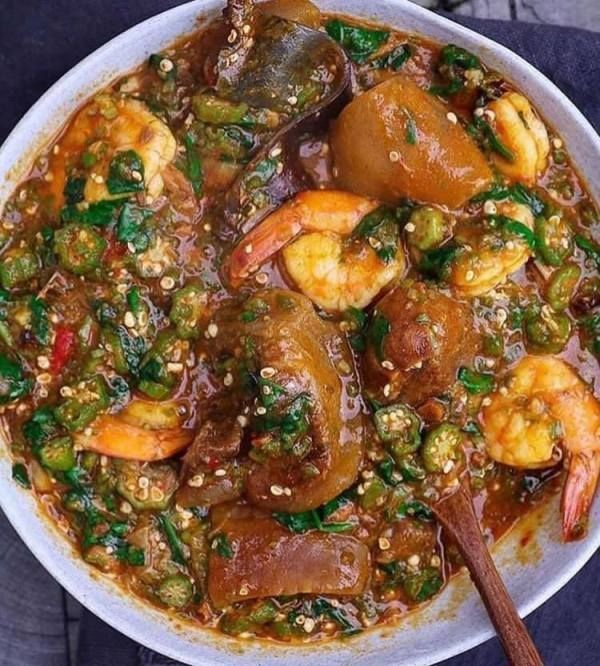
Nigerian okra soup

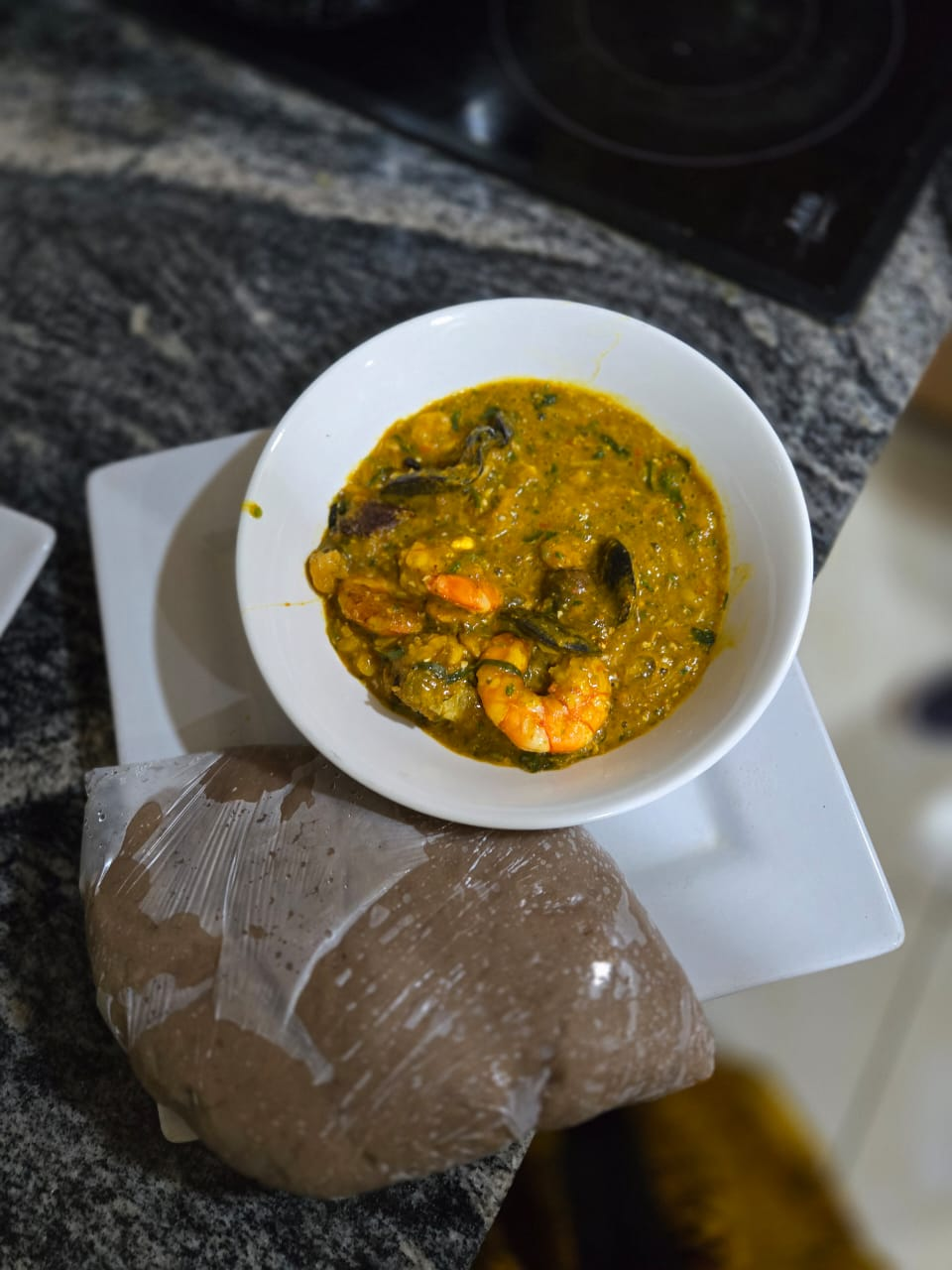
An image of Amala and Seafood Okro

== See also ==
- Gumbo
- List of soups
- List of vegetable soups
