= Funkaso =

Hausa dish

- Alternative names: Pinkaso
- Type: Doughnut
- Course: Side dish or snack
- Place of origin: West Africa
- Main ingredients: flour, yeast, onion, scotch bonnet peppers, and salt

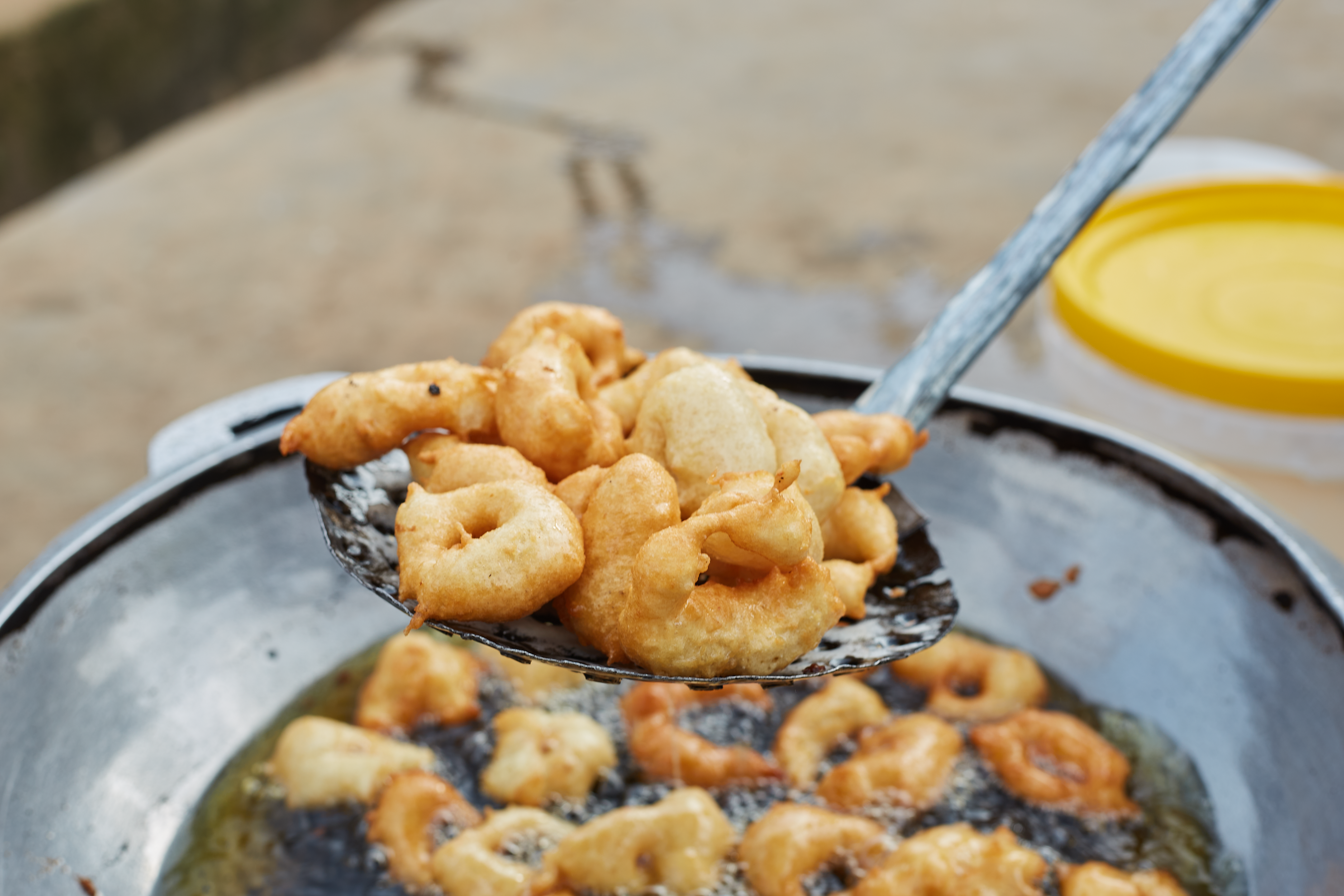

Funkaso, or Pinkaso, is a Hausa savoury fried dumpling made with wheat and eaten with soup, honey or sugar.

== See also ==
- List of African dishes
