= Ogbono soup =

Nigerian soup dish

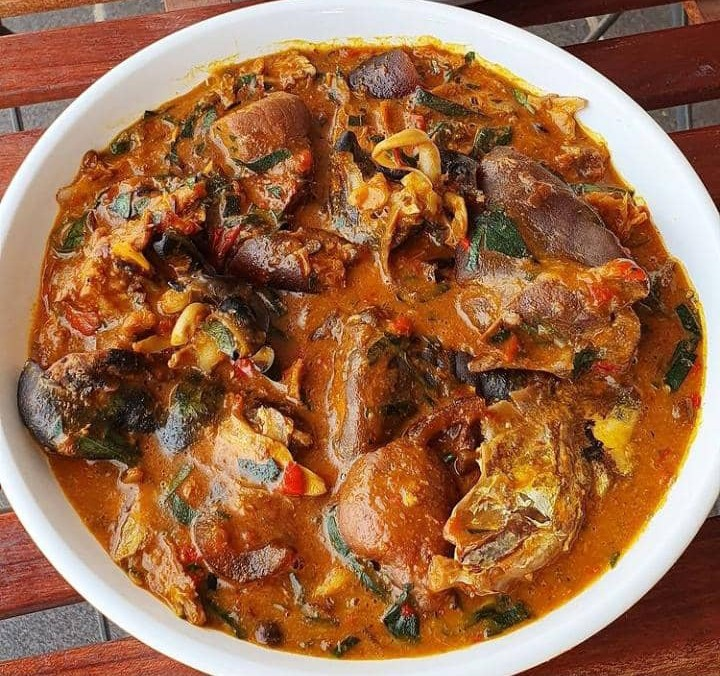
- Ogbono soup with assorted meats
- Alternative names: Draw soup
- Type: Soup
- Place of origin: Nigeria
- Serving temperature: Hot
- Main ingredients: Ogbono seeds, water, oil, leaf vegetables (bitterleaf and celosia), other vegetables, seasonings, meat

Ogbono soup is a staple soup in Nigerian cuisine. It is made with ground dry ogbono seeds. The seed is a major ingredient in various West African cuisines and it is made with considerable local variation across cultures. According to research by Chris Chinaka and J.C. Obiefuna, ogbono is an indigenous forest tree associated with plants classified as "non-timber forest products". It goes by various indigenous names among Nigerians. The common use of the word “ogbono” in general Nigerian parlance stems from the Igbo name for the word. Among the Nupe people, it is called 'pekpeara', 'ogwi' in Bini, 'uyo' in Efik, and 'oro' or ‘apon’ in Yoruba, and 'goro' or 'goronor' in Hausa. Although ogbono (dika nut) and ugiri, the Igbo name for bush-mango, are very similar and often regarded as equivalents, there is technically a distinction.

The ground ogbono seeds are used as a thickener, and give the soup a black or brown coloration. Besides seeds, water and palm oil, it typically contains meat and/or fish seasonings such as chili pepper, salt, crayfish, leaf vegetables and other vegetables. Typical leaf vegetables include bitterleaf and celosia and ogiri. Typical vegetables include tomatoes and okra. Typical seasonings include chiles, onions, bouillon cubes ("Maggi" in Nigerian parlance), and iru (fermented locust beans). Typical meats include beef, goat, fish, chicken, bushmeat, shrimp, or crayfish.

For individual preferences, ogbono soup can be cooked together with egusi; it can also be cooked together with okra. These methods are likely ways to make the soup thicker and spicier.

It can be eaten with fufu, semo, wheat swallow, with pounded yam, or the processed and fried garri. In other countries the soup may be available in packaged prepared form in some markets that specialize in Western African foods. Ogbono soup has a mucilaginous draw texture, similar to okra soup.

It is widely cultivated for its edible sweet fruits and seeds in West and Central African countries such as Nigeria, Cameroon, Côte d’Ivoire, Ghana, Togo, and Benin.

== Etymology ==
The name "ogbono" (also spelled "agbono") derives from two Igbo roots: -gbo meaning "to foam, bubble or froth" and -nọ or -lo meaning "to be slimy or slippery", which together describe the thick, sticky texture the ground seeds produce when cooked. The soup is widely known across Nigeria and West Africa, where it goes by various local names. Some of the other names it goes by across the region include:

- Igbo : Ọgbọnọ, Agbọnọ
- Yoruba : Apon, Ọrọ, ogbono(via Igbo: ogbono)
- Hausa : Goro, Goronor
- Nupe : Pekpeara
- Bini : Ogwi
- Efik : Uyo

The widespread adoption of the Igbo term "ogbono" across Nigerian ethnic groups reflects the central role of Igbo traders and culinary traditions in spreading the seed's use throughout Nigeria and beyond.

== Ingredients ==
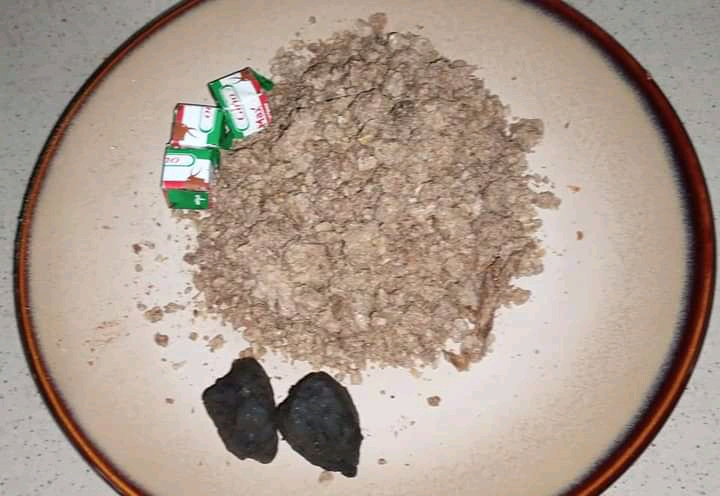
Ogbono soup ingredients:blended Ogbono seeds, okpei and seasoning cube

- 1½lbs of assorted meat
- 1 cup of dry grounded ogbono
- 6tbsps of grinded crayfish (divided)
- 1 large dry fish(washed and soaked in warm water)
- 1-2 habanero pepper or ata-rodo
- 1-2 tbsps. of dry grounded pepper or red chili flakes
- 90-100mls of palm oil
- one bunch of water leaves(optional)
- 2tbsps of uziza leaves
- 16 fingers of okra (chopped into any size)
- 1 bouillon
- salt to taste.

== Health benefits ==
Ogbono, also known scientifically as Irvingia gabonensis, is a versatile plant that serves many purposes. Its fruit, nuts, seeds, and bark can be used for culinary, manufacturing, cosmetic, and medicinal purposes. It is rich in nutrients and, per 100g, contains dietary fiber, protein, healthy fats, vitamins A and C, magnesium, and calcium.

The fat extracted from the seeds is a good source of myristic, lauric, palmitic, and oleic fatty acids.. The macronutrients found in Ogbono soup include carbohydrates, fiber, fats, protein, and water, all of which support effective body function.

== See also ==
- List of African dishes
- List of soups
- Nigerian cuisine
