= Pounded yam =

Yam-based staple food from West Africa

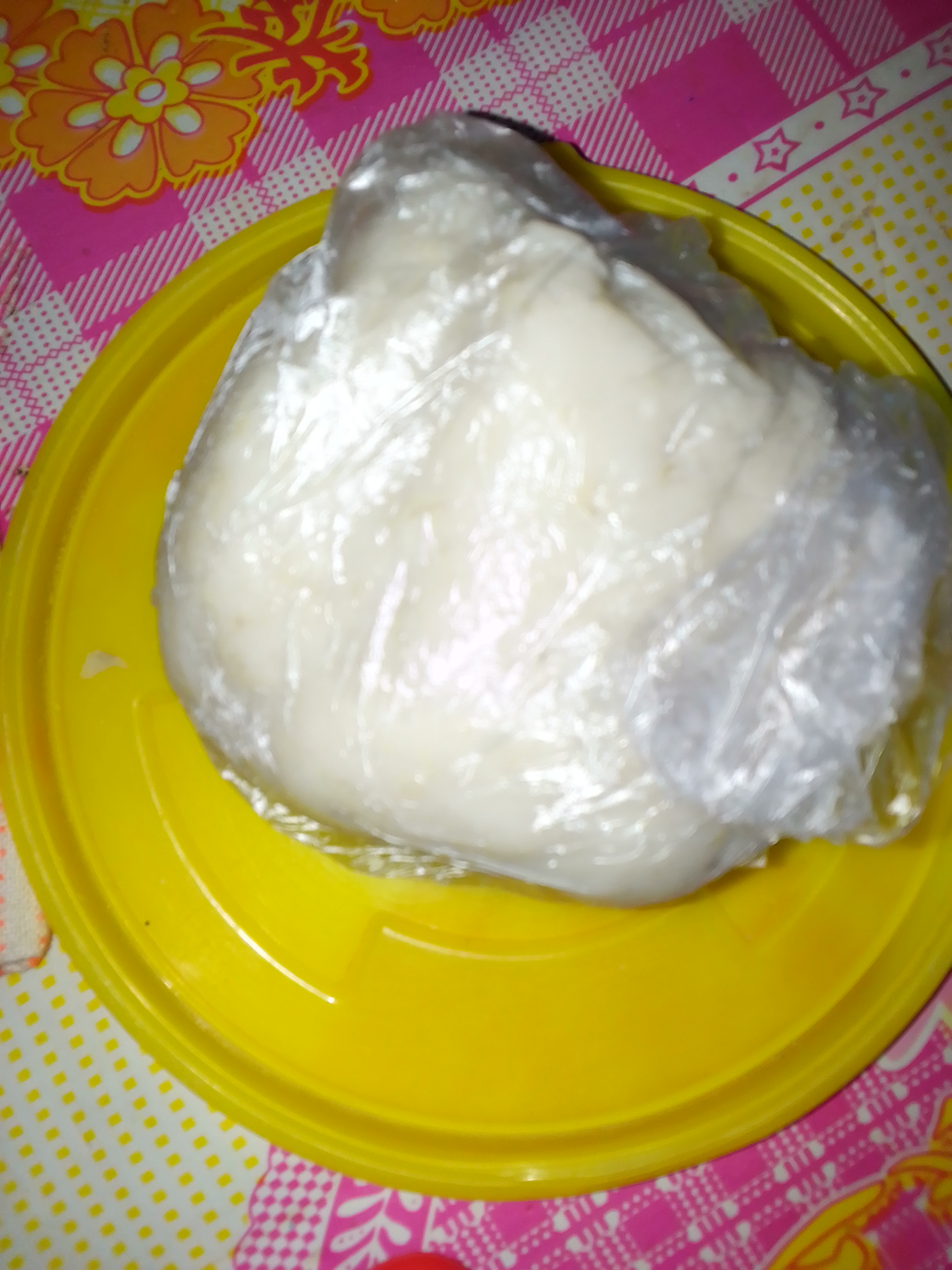
- Pounded yam
- Type: Swallow
- Place of origin: Nigeria
- Region or state: Hausa, Igbo, Yoruba.
- Serving temperature: Warm
- Main ingredients: Yam; Water
- Ingredients generally used: Salt

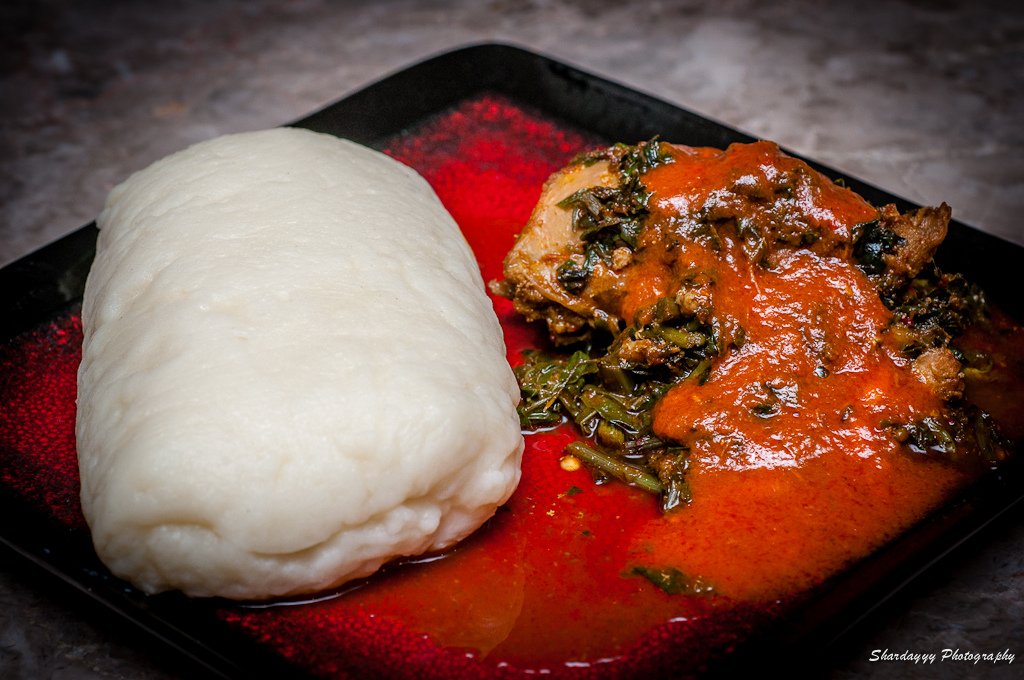
Pounded yam and soup

Pounded yam (Yoruba: iyán, Hausa: sakwara, Igbo: utara-ji) is a Nigerian swallow food. It is commonly prepared by pounding boiled yam with a mortar and pestle. Pounded yam is similar to mashed potatoes but heavier in consistency. It is smooth and eaten with the hands.

It can be served with egusi soup, ogbono soup, jute leaves soup (ewedu), stewed spinach (efo riro), okra soup, ofe akwu (palmnut soup), Ofe Nsala (white soup), and others.

== Preparation ==
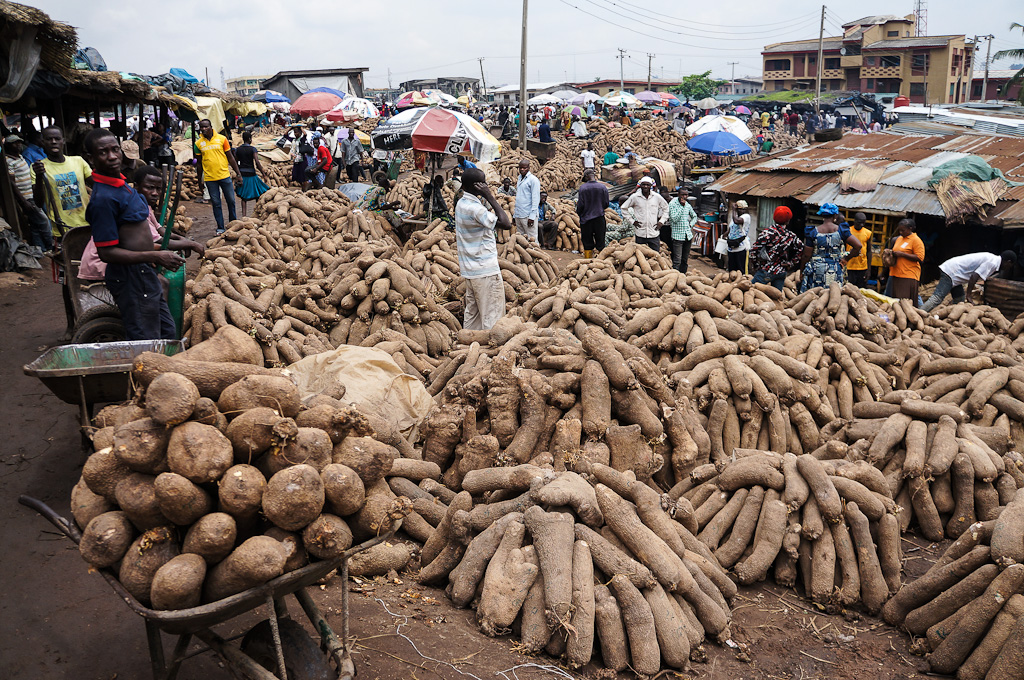
A yam market in Lagos, Nigeria

It is prepared by pounding boiled yam with a mortar and pestle, yam grinder, food processor or mixer. The type of yam used for pounded yam is the African yam also known as puna yam, true yam or white yam. The texture is rough with brown skin and off-white flesh with its length similar to regular potatoes up to five feet long. African yam is rich in carbohydrates and calories.

== Serving ==
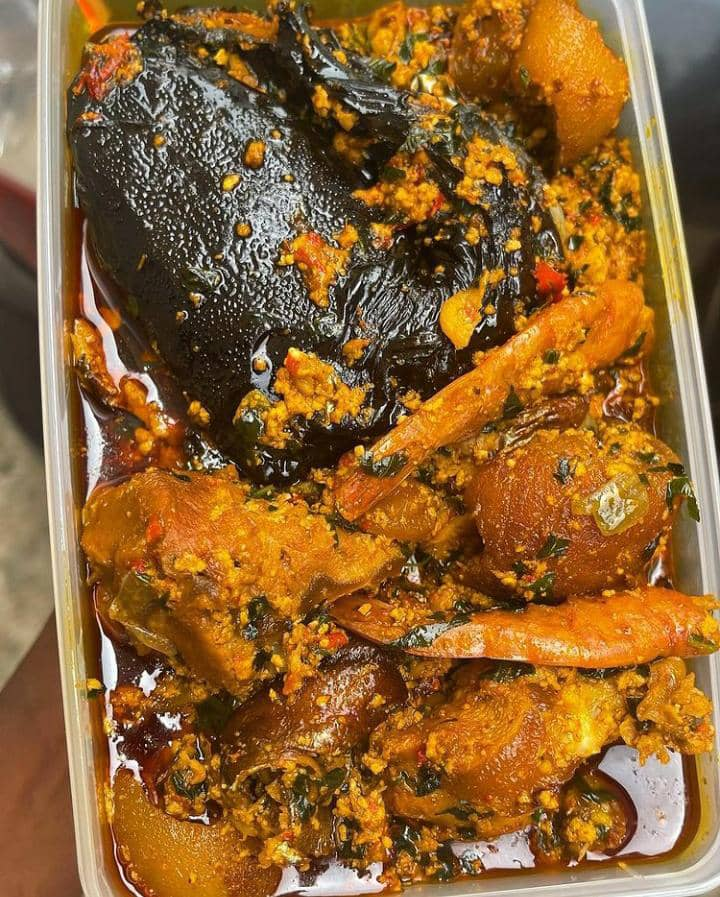
Egusi soup

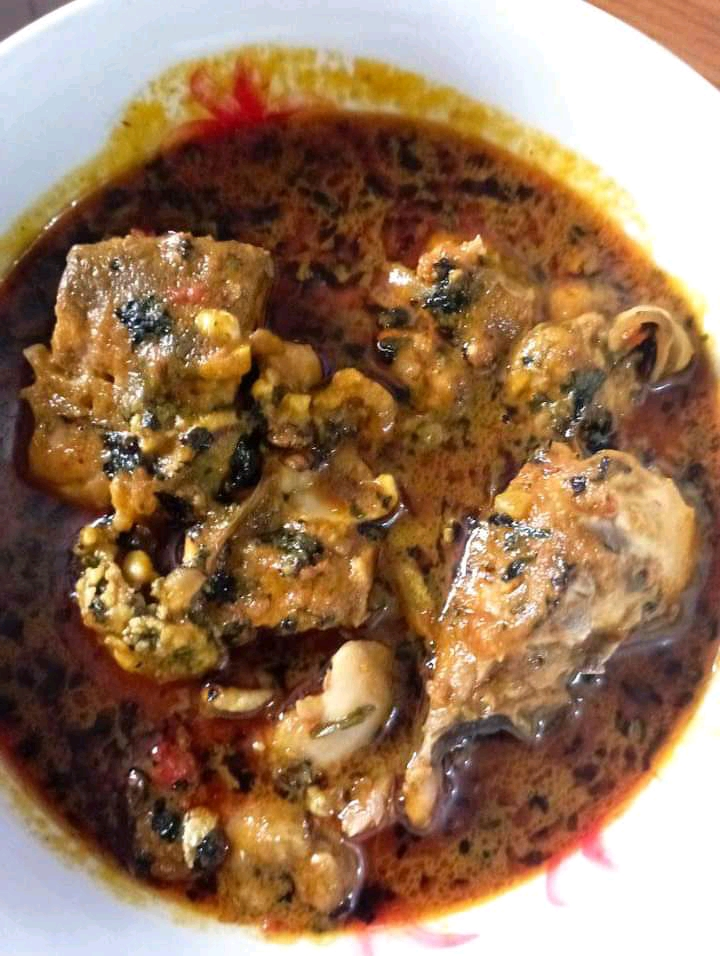
Banga soup

Pounded yam is eaten with okro soup, ẹ̀fọ́ rírò, banga soup (ofe akwu), ogbono, gbẹ̀gìrì soup and Egusi soup.

== Variations ==
A variation of pounded yam peculiar to Ile-Ife is known as iyan gbere. This version of the dish incorporates the African breadfruit (Treculia africana). To prepare iyan gbere, the African breadfruit is first cooked until it is soft. It is then pounded or blended to create a smooth, dough-like consistency. This breadfruit paste is combined with the traditional yam paste used in iyan. Iyan gbere is served with Nigerian soups such as egusi or okra soup. The addition of the African breadfruit gives the dish a distinct taste and nutritional profile.

== See also ==
- Eba
- Fufu
- Amala
- List of African dishes
- Nigerian cuisine
