= Agidi =

Nigerian food

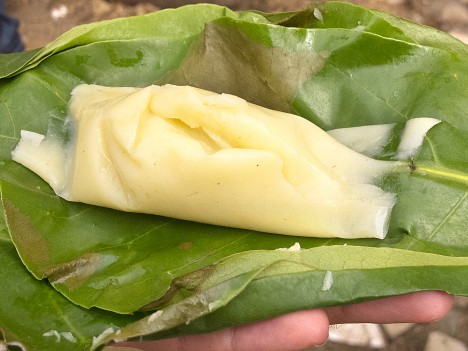
- Agidi
- Alternative names: Nigerian corn pudding
- Type: Traditional Nigerian food
- Place of origin: Nigeria
- Region or state: Nigeria
- Serving temperature: Warm
- Main ingredients: Corn flour; Water
- Ingredients generally used: Salt

Agidi is a staple food eaten across West Africa. It is mostly popular among people of Southern and parts of Northern Nigeria. The Ngwa Igbos refer to it as Àsụrụàsụ Oka, Nri Oka, or Agidi (Igbo), Eko/Agidi(Yoruba), Akasan(Benin), Komu(Hausa), Kafa(Ghana), Akwapim (Togo). It is often described as a Nigerian jelly-like dish and is made in a way similar to pap (ogi or akamụ). Agidi also has a variant known as “Agidi Jollof,” which is prepared similarly to Jollof rice. Agidi Jollof is most similar to the mesoamerican tamale dish. It is made with corn flour and water.

== Overview ==
Agidi is a staple food across West Africa, and most popular across the Southern and parts of Northern Nigeria. The word Agidi is documented in the Yoruba dictionary to mean a meal made from an indian corn meal. It is popularly known as Eko among the Yorubas and Agidi among the Igbos. It is a smooth, soft, and mildly fermented pudding that holds a special place in many Nigerian households. It is best served with warm sauces or dishes such as Ofe Akwu, Banga soup, pepper soup, Ofe Nsala, stewed vegetables, Akara, or any accompaniment of choice.

== Health benefits ==
Since it is made from corn and water, its health benefits are similar to those of maize, including being rich in potassium, helping to reduce blood cholesterol, and aiding in the prevention of diverticulosis. Due to its high fiber content, it may also help reduce constipation.

== Variant ==
=== Agidi jollof ===
Young lady selling agidi jollof on the streets of Awka, Anambra state

Agidi Jollof is a culinary variation of Agidi white. Agidi jollof is typically pink, bright red or yellow in color due to the tomato stew, meat broth or stock added during preparation. Unlike white Agidi, which is usually paired with a side dish, Agidi Jollof can be eaten on its own, similar to Okpa or Moi Moi. The ingredients used in making it include:

- Corn starch
- Fresh tomatoes
- Scotch bonnet
- Red bell pepper
- Onion
- Minced meat/ Minced chicken/ Mashed boneless fish or soft Marrow bones
- Vegetable oil
- Water
- Bouillon cubes
- Salt
