= Palm nut soup =

Soup made from palm fruit

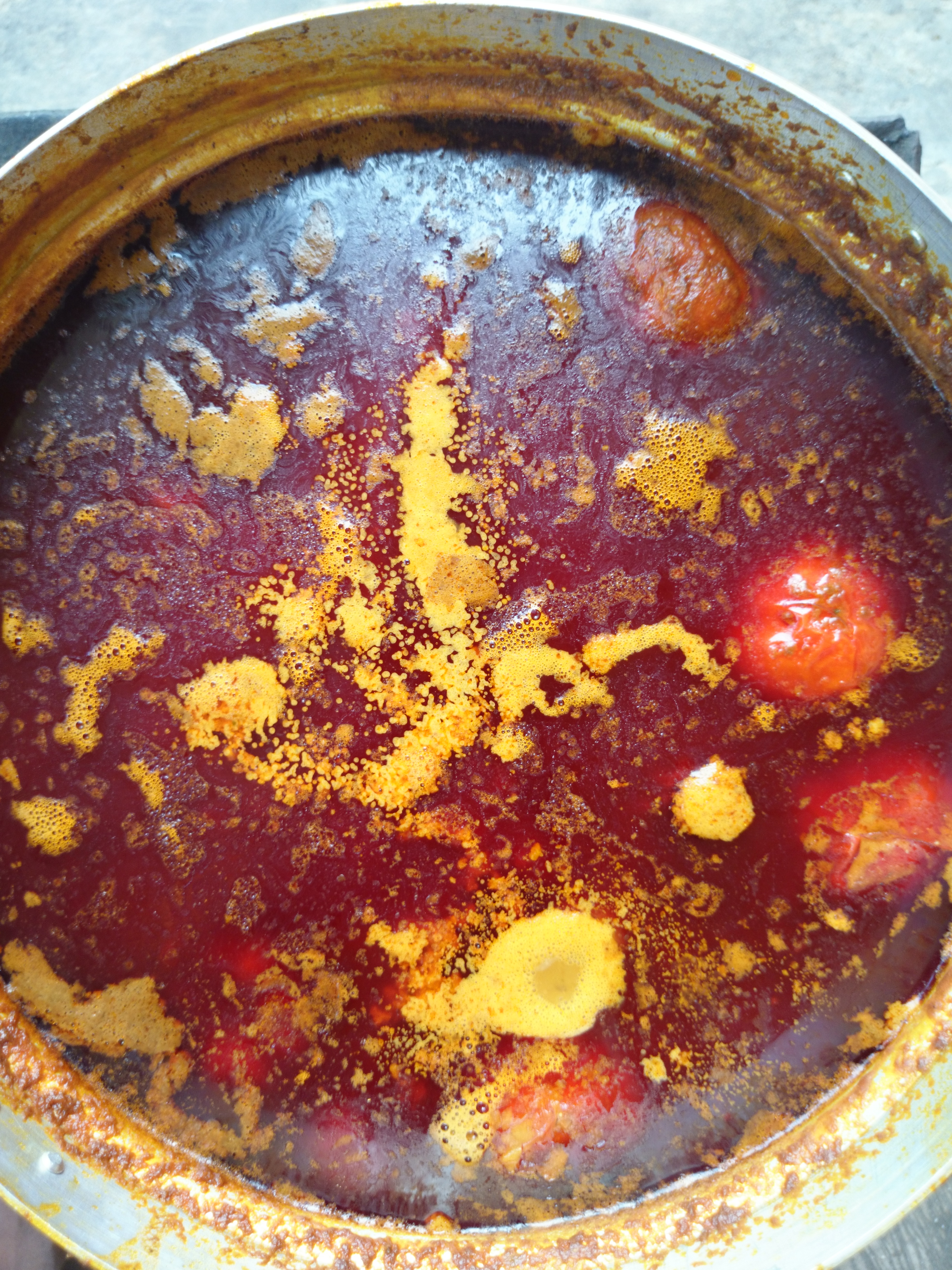
A close-up view of palm nut soup

Palm nut soup or banga is a soup made from palm fruit common in Cameroon, Sierra Leone, Ghana, Nigeria, Democratic Republic of Congo and Ivory Coast. The soup is made from a palm cream or palm nut base with stewed marinated meats, smoked dried fish, and aromatics. It is often eaten with starch, eba, fufu, omotuo, banku, fonio.

== By region ==
=== Cameroon ===
Mbanga soup is a palm fruit soup in Cameroonian cuisine and West African cuisine. It is often served with kwacoco. The soup is Cameroon's version of the West African banga, a palm fruit soup eaten in areas including parts of Nigeria. In Cameroon mbanga is made using fresh palm nuts. Outside the area canned nuts can be used.

=== Nigeria ===
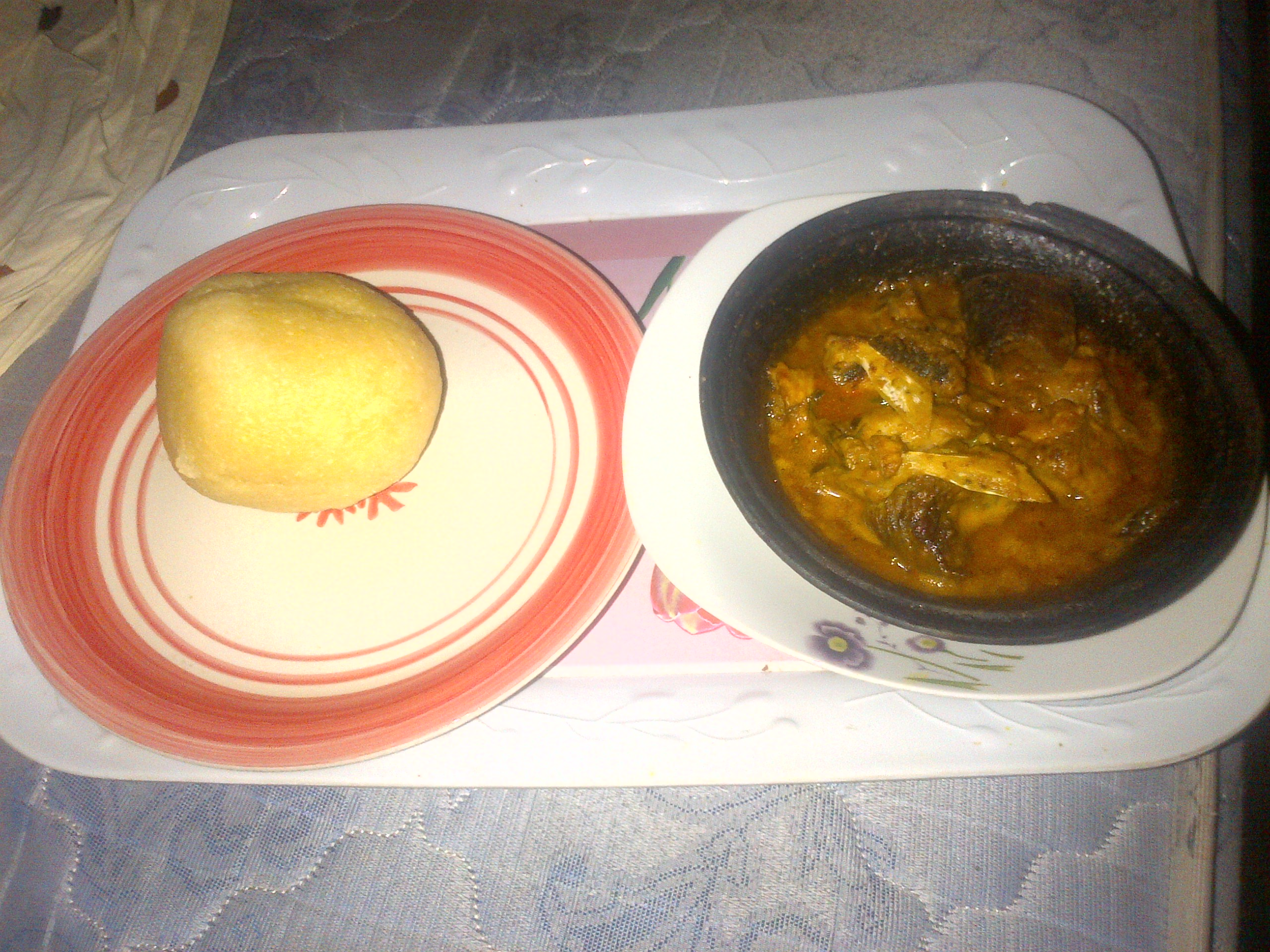
Eba (garri from cassava) served with fresh fish banga (palm kernel) soup in a clay pot

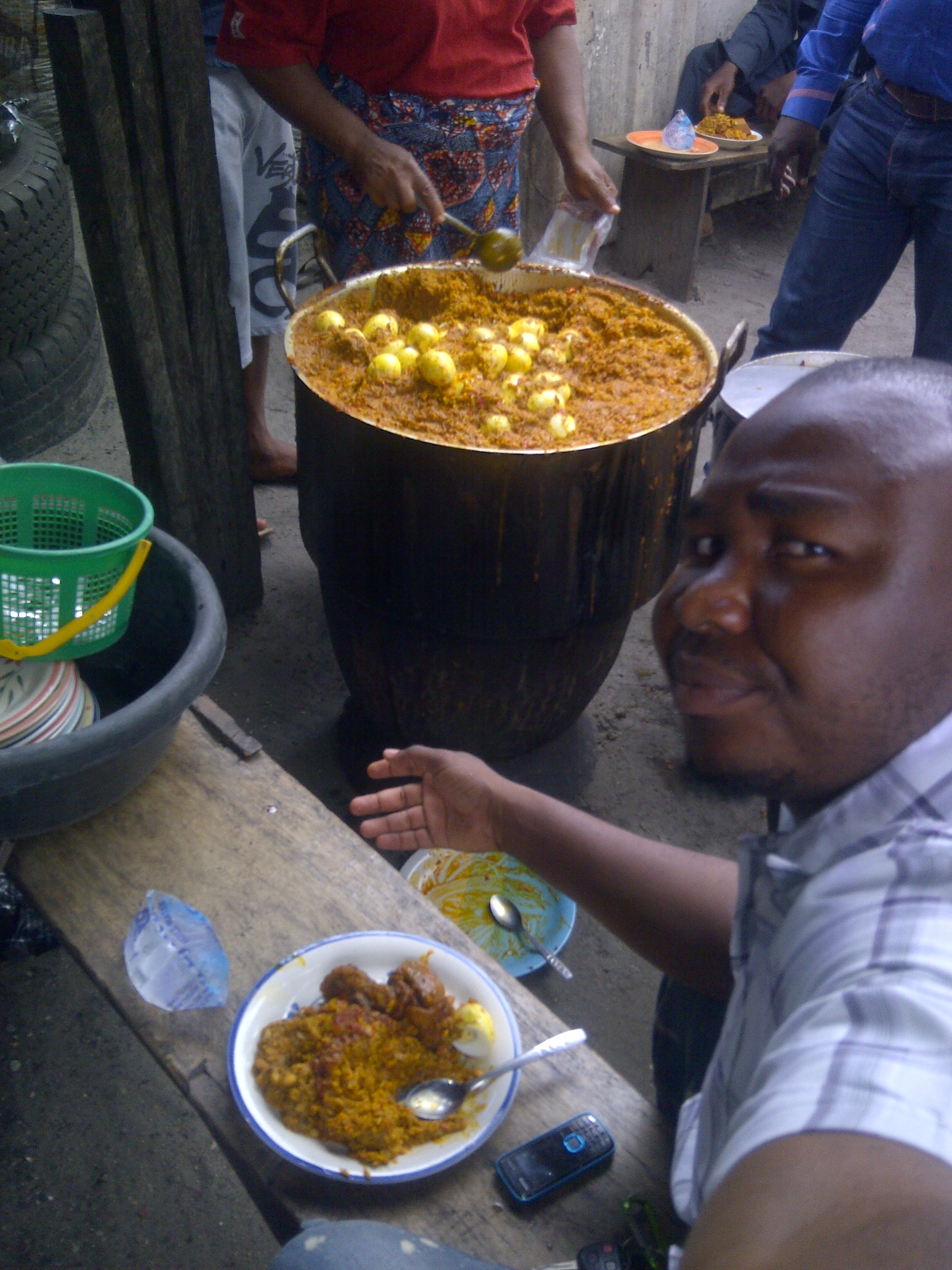
Palm oil rice (banga rice) served with assorted cuts of beef and boiled egg

Banga is a type of palm fruit soup from Southern (the Niger Delta) Nigeria, particularly the Itsekiri, Isoko, Ijaw and Urhobo ethnic groups. This cuisine is quite different from ofe akwụ, a variant found in Igbo culture. The Binis have a soup from palm fruits similar to ofe akwu in ingredients and manner of preparation. The Itsekiri people call it obieyen, Urhobo people call it ame edi, while the Isoko call it Izuwo ibiedi.

In Nigeria, this soup accompanies dishes such as starch (usi) and (Eba) for the Itsekiri people of Delta State, Nigeria, starch and garri was introduced by the Itsekiris who got cassava from the Europeans who taught them how to process it. The Igbo people have the stew and soup varieties made from palm fruits. Ofe akwu is the stew variety usually eaten with rice while the palm fruit extract is used especially in Anambra state to prepare oha and onugbu soup accompanied with swallows, malleable starch-based foods eaten by hand, such as pounded cassava (utara/akpu) and corn/cassava flour (nni oka).

The palm fruit is often harvested from locally grown palm fruit trees, after which it is thoroughly washed, boiled and mashed for the extraction of its oil, the main ingredient in the preparation of banga soup.

Banga soup is flavored with beletete, aidan fruit, rohojie, spice leaves called obenetietien (scent or bitter leaves can be substituted), a stick of oburunbebe, finely chopped onion, ground crayfish, chili pepper or Scotch bonnet, and salt. The soup is eaten with starch made with cassava and palm oil or rice in southern parts of Nigeria. Banga soup is mostly prepared using fresh catfish, dried or smoked fish, or meat. Okra may be added. It is made by extracting the liquid of palm kernels. Thereafter, other ingredients like crayfish, meat, fish, pepper and cow tripe are added. It is eaten with eba (garri) or usi (starch). (Elaeis guineensis) extract.

== Gallery ==
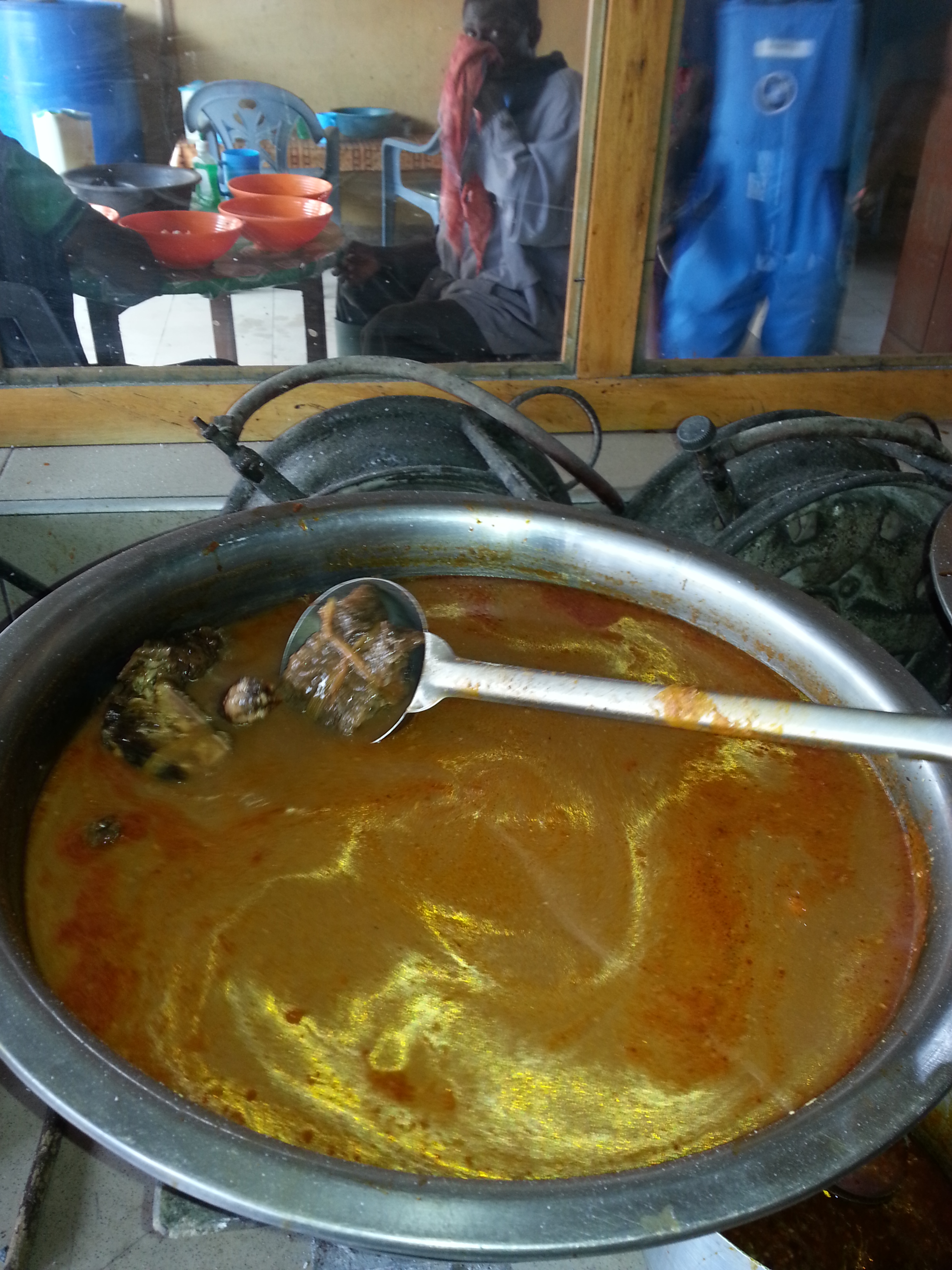
Palm nut soup with fish

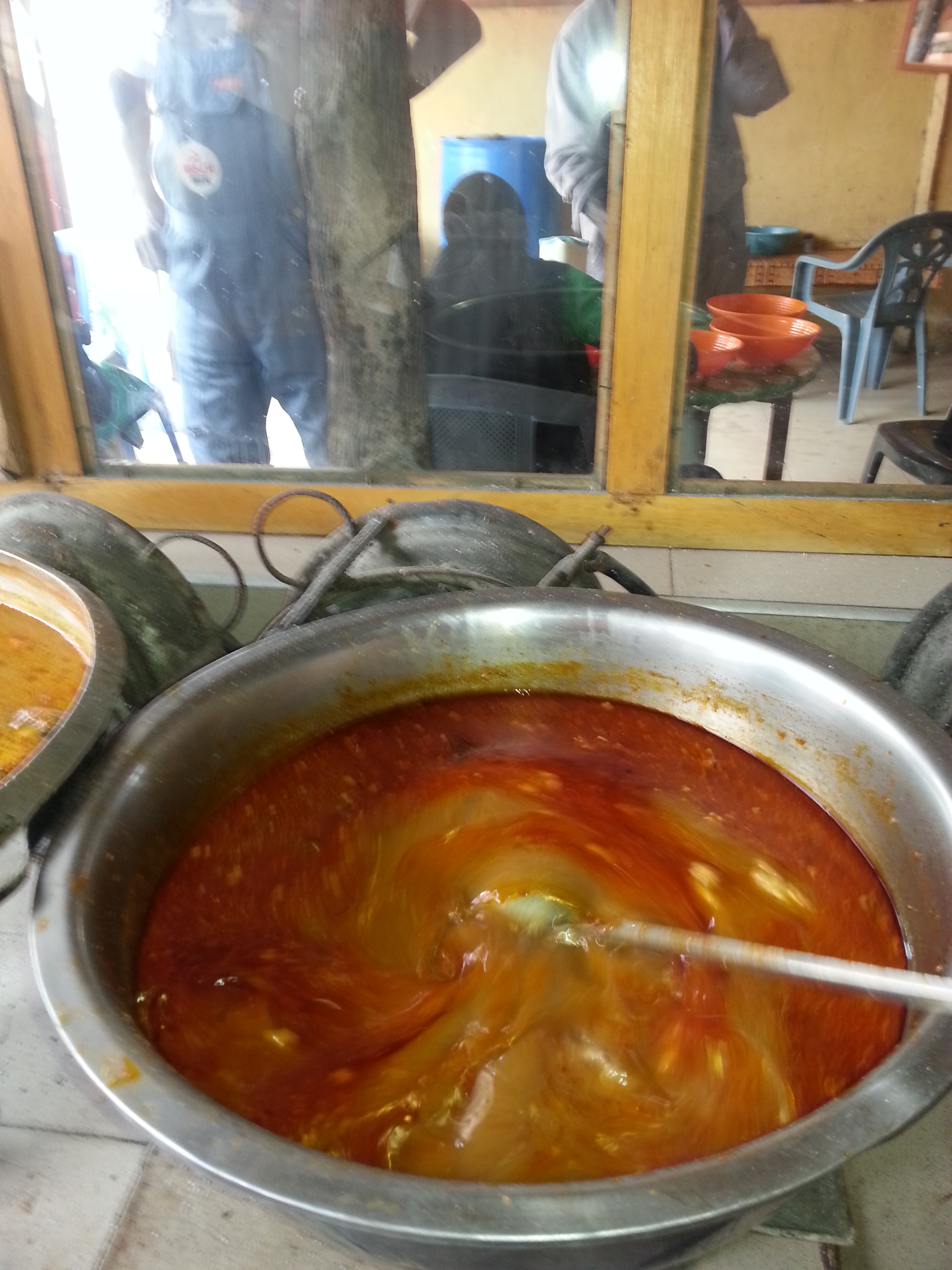
Palm nut soup

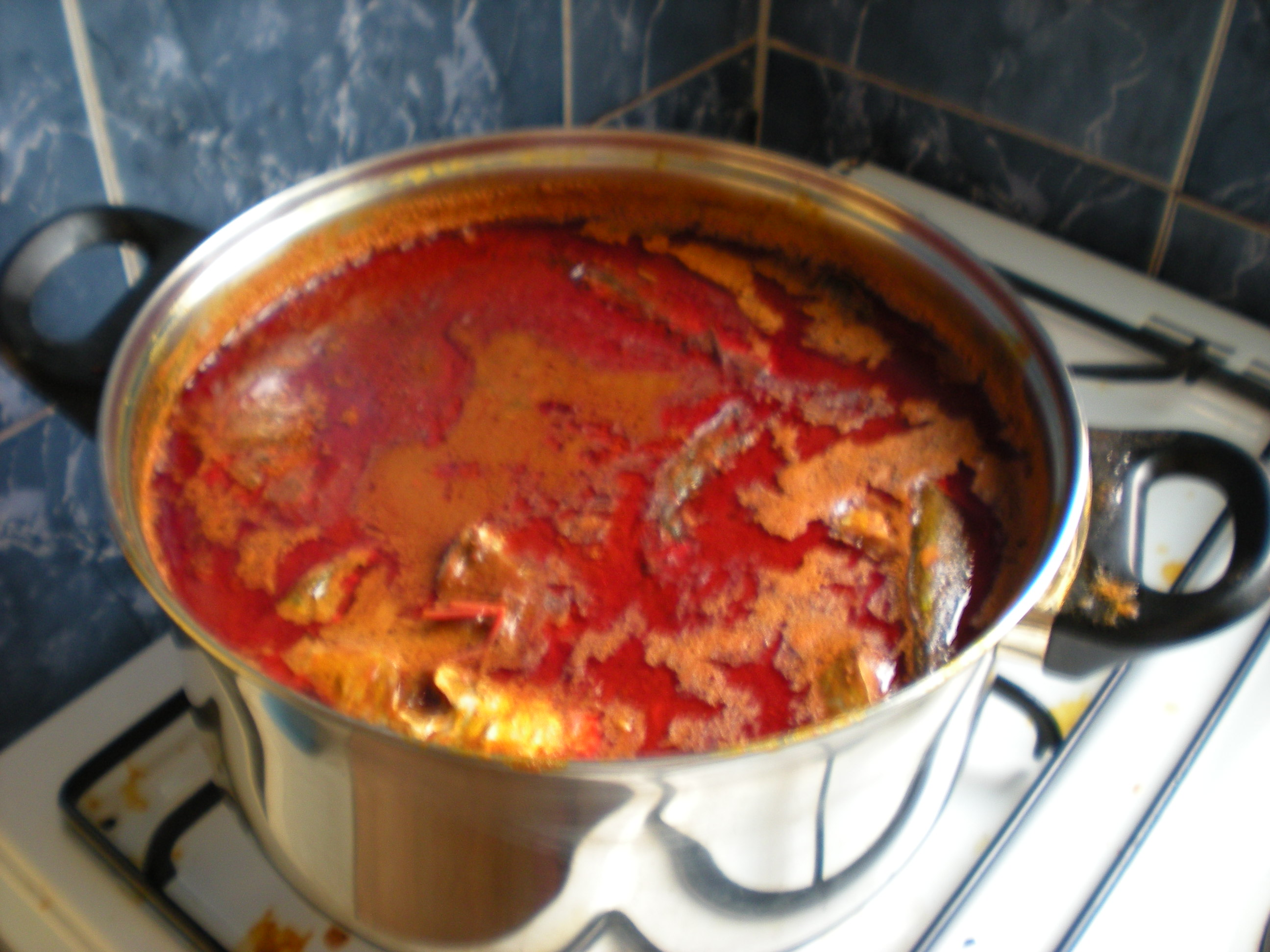
Akan Ghanaian palm nut soup

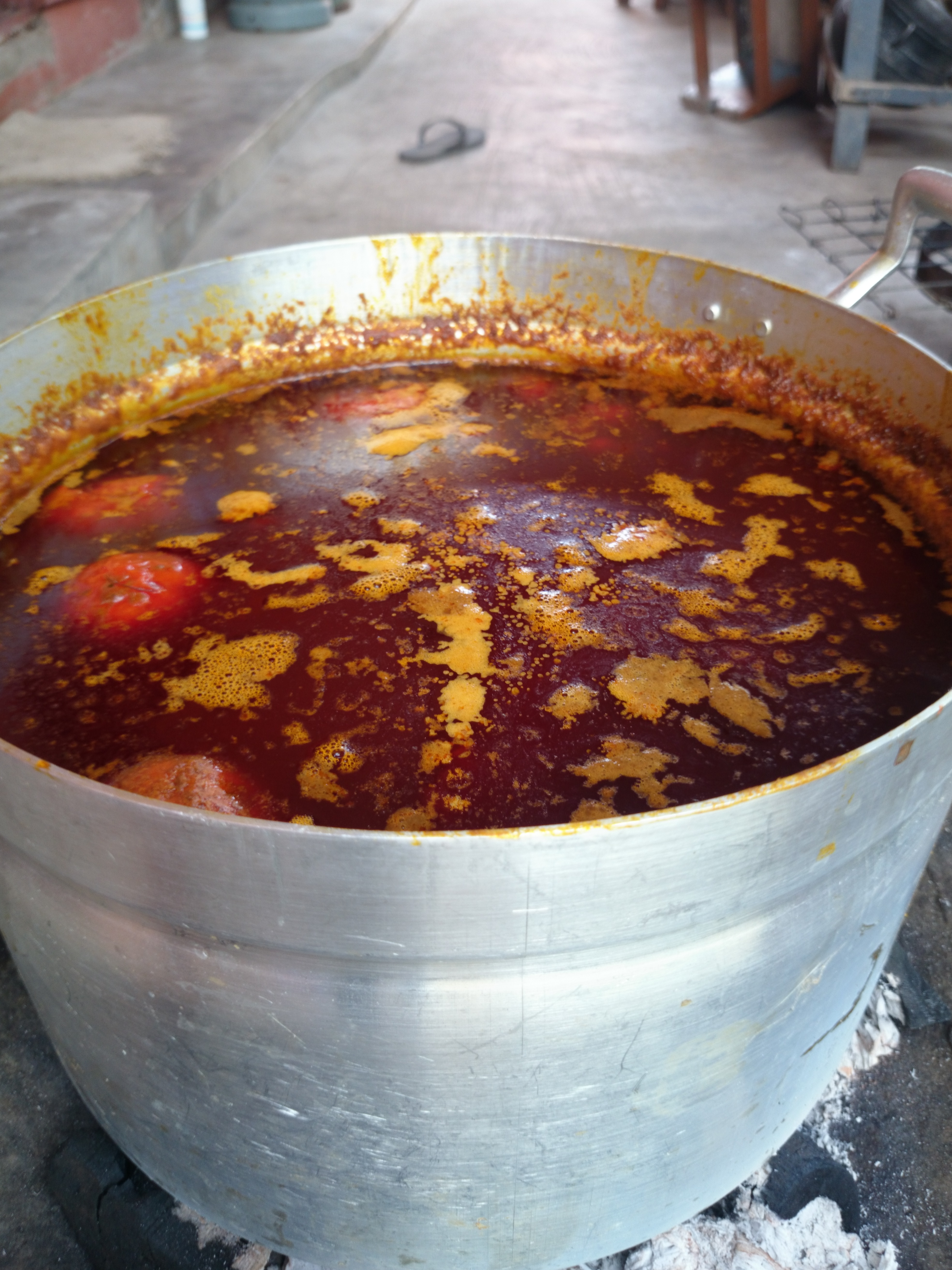
Palm nut soup close up

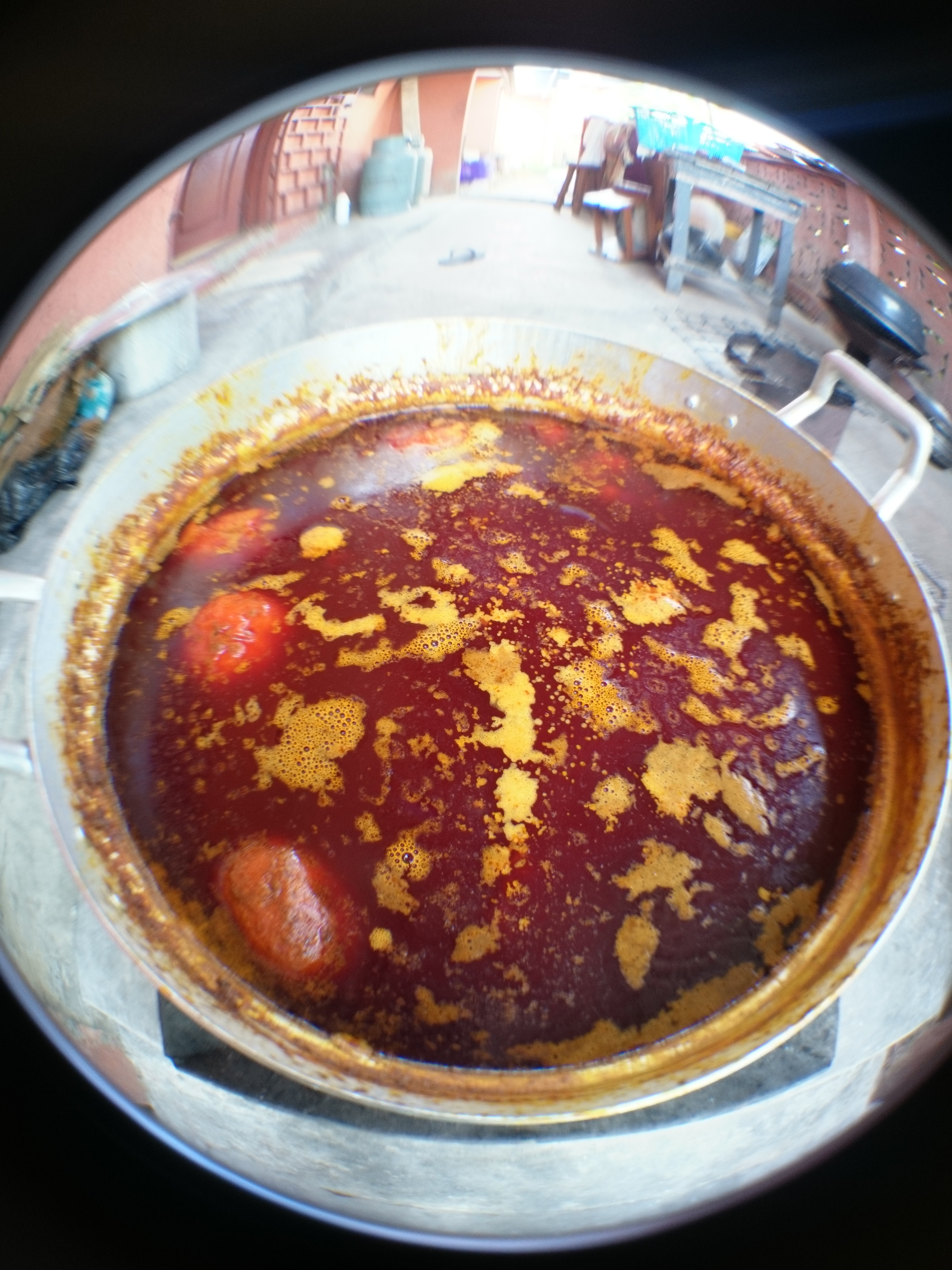
Palm nut soup

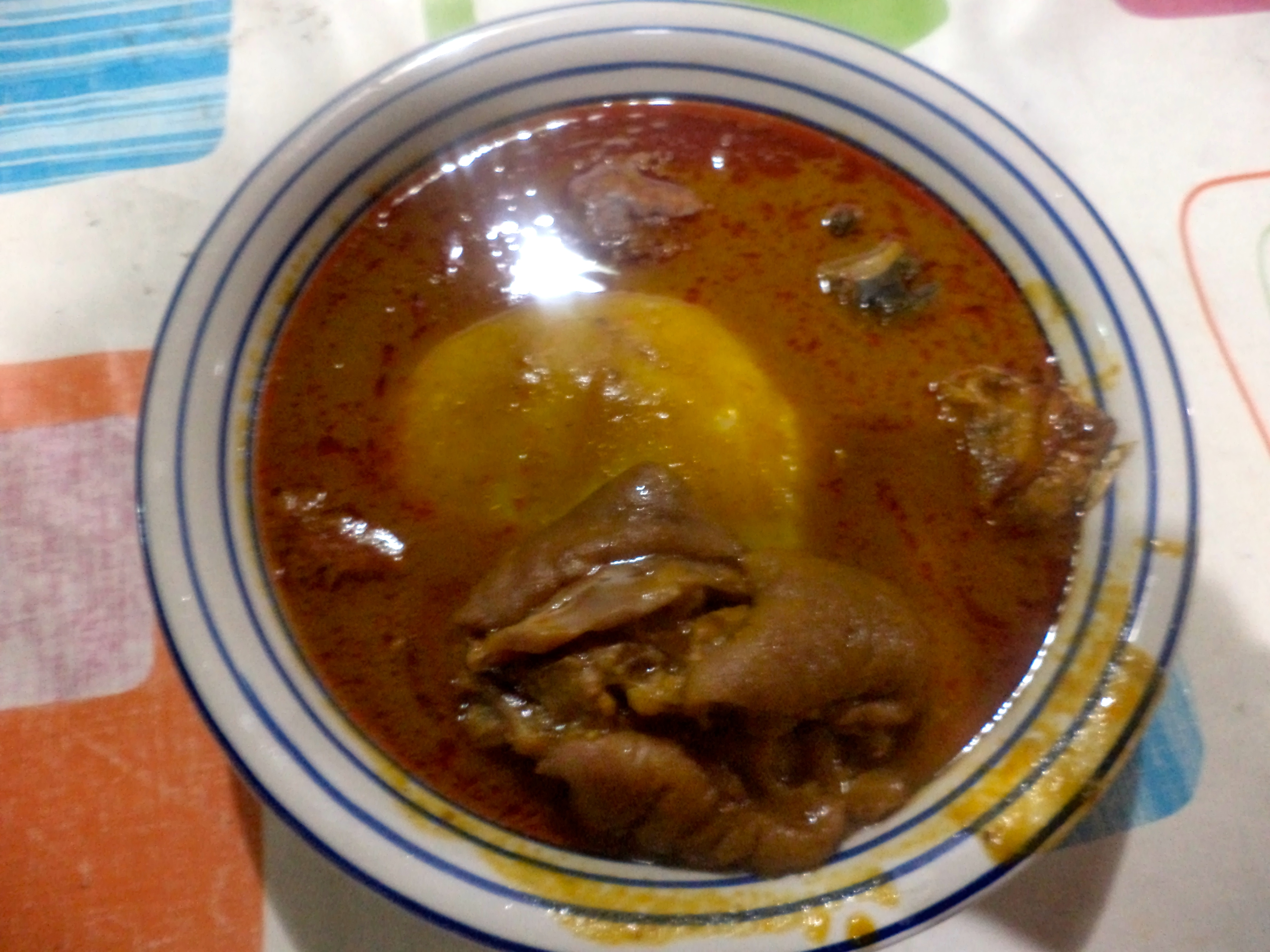
Fufu with palm nut soup, snail and tilapia

== See also ==
- Groundnut soup
- Kpekpele
- List of soups
