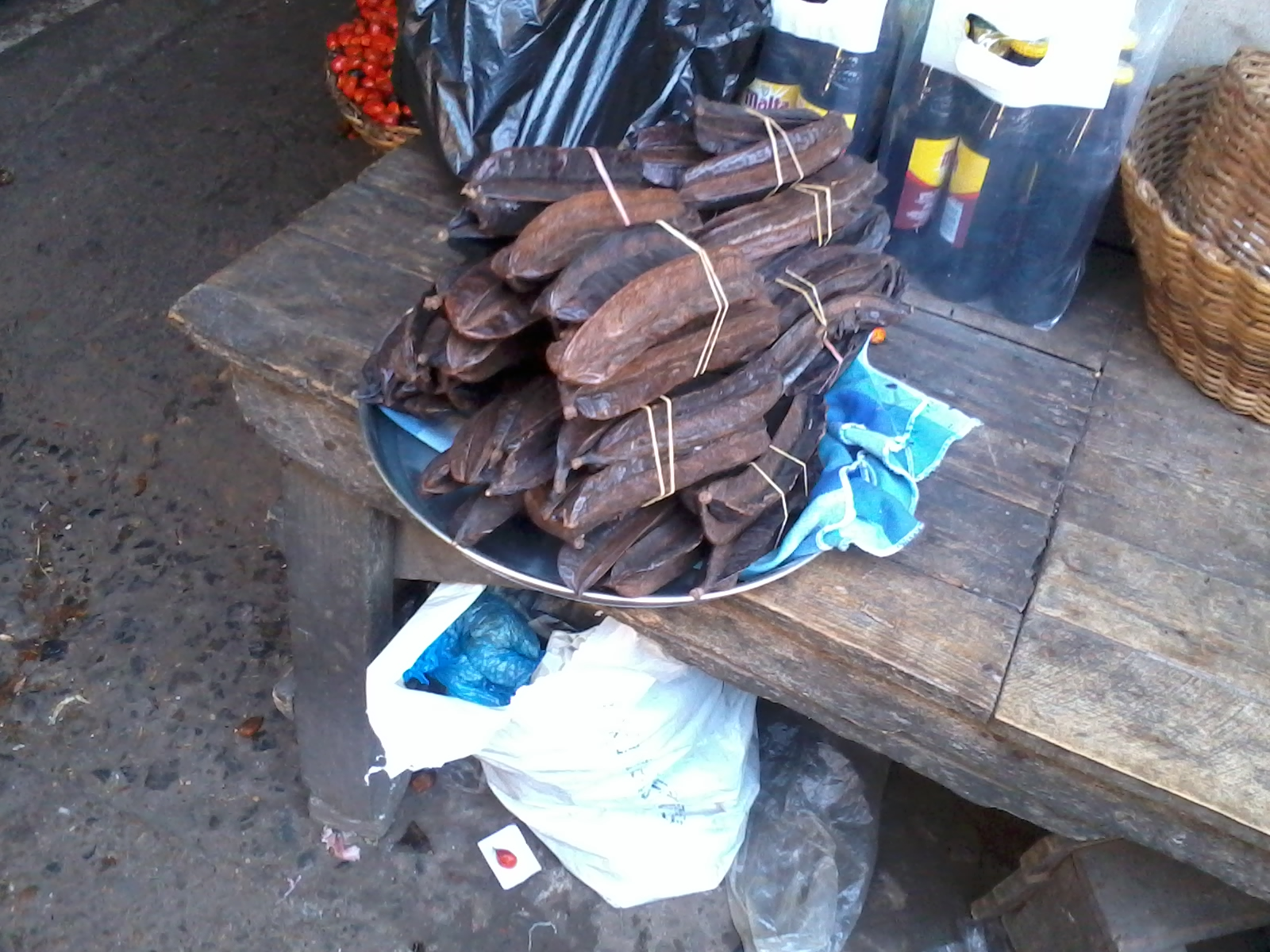
- Tetrapleura tetraptera

Scientific classification
- Kingdom: Plantae
- Clade: Tracheophytes
- Clade: Angiosperms
- Clade: Eudicots
- Clade: Rosids
- Order: Fabales
- Family: Fabaceae
- Subfamily: Caesalpinioideae
- Clade: Mimosoid clade
- Genus: Tetrapleura; Benth. (1841)

= Tetrapleura (plant) =

Genus of legumes

Tetrapleura is a genus of flowering plants in the mimosoid clade of the family Fabaceae. It includes two species of trees native to sub-Saharan Africa, ranging from Senegal to Kenya and Tanzania, and south to Angola. They grow in tropical lowland rain forest, secondary thicket, and fringing forest in the Guineo-Congolian forest and Lake Victoria basin.

Species in this genus include:

- Tetrapleura chevalieri (Harms) Baker f.
- Tetrapleura tetraptera (Schumach. & Thonn.) Taub. – Prekese tree
