= Ga-Mashie =

Home of the original Ga settlers in Accra, Ghana

Coordinates: 5°32′18″N 0°12′36″W

Ga-Mashie is the home of the original Ga settlers and the original name of Accra, Ghana's capital. They celebrate the Homowo festival.

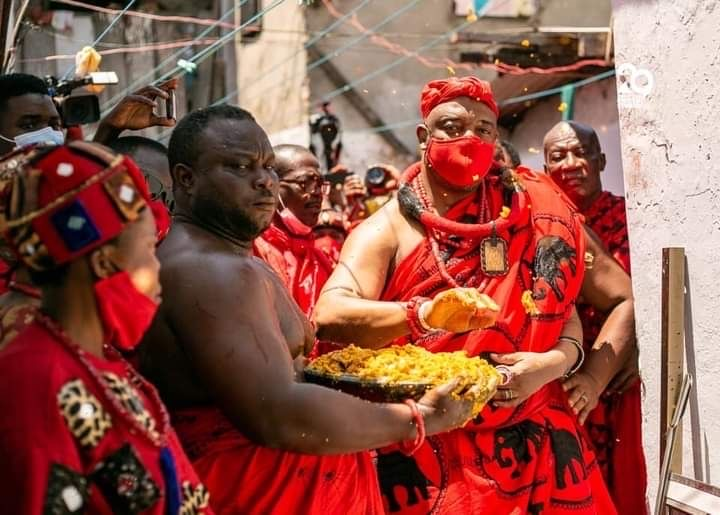
Homowo Festival in Ga Mashie
