= Afia Efere =

Nigerian soup

Afia Efere // is a Nigerian soup popular amongst the Ibibio/Efik tribe. The soup is also known as white soup due to absence of palm oil in it.

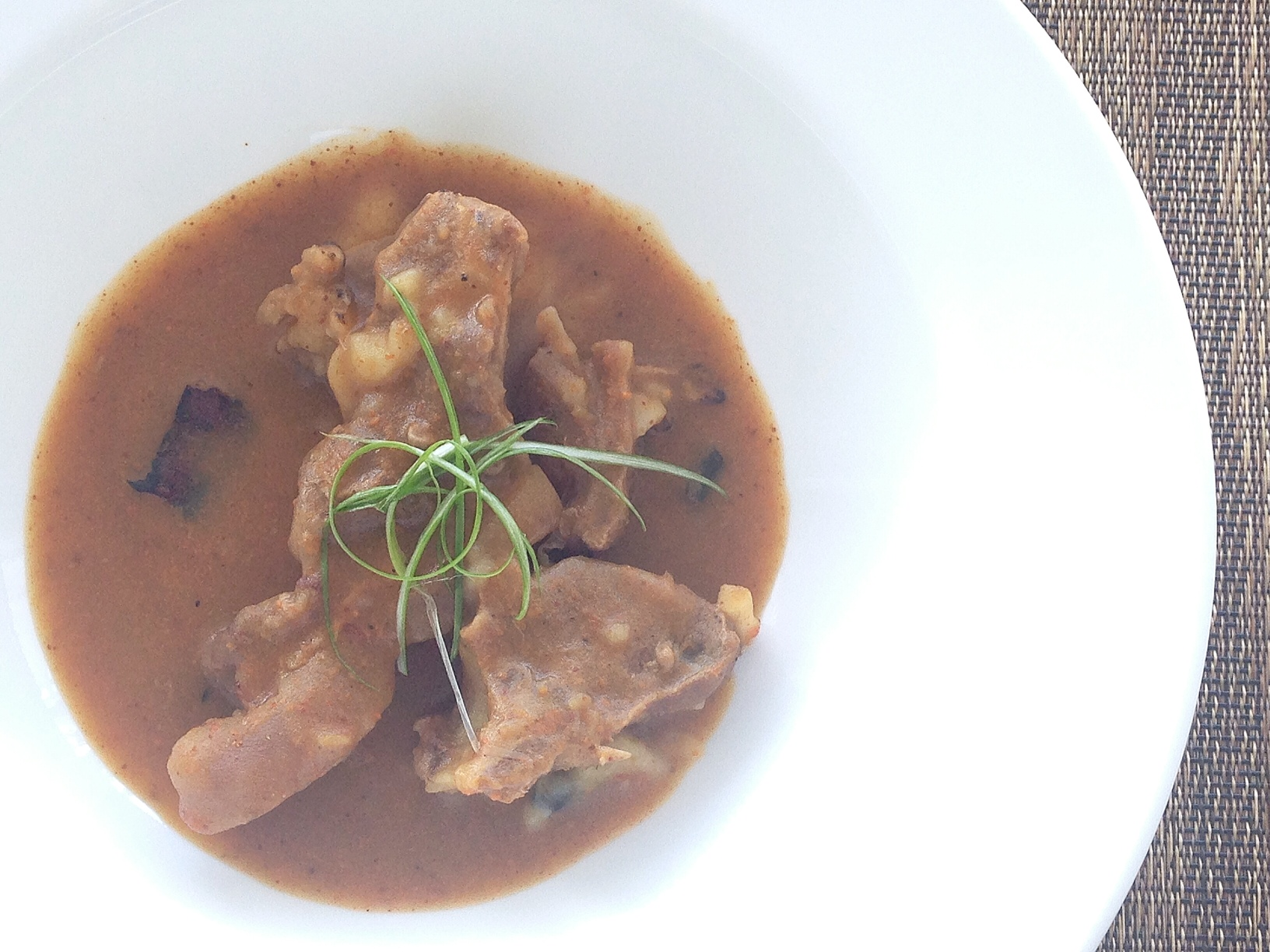
Afia Efere soup

== Origin ==
White soup is a soup prepared by people of the Southern region of Nigeria. It has two variations in Nigeria, the Igbo version (Ofe Nsala) and the Ibibio/Efik version (Afia Efere). Afia Efere is similar to the Igbo soup 'Ofe Nsala' except that fewer ingredients are used, and the latter does not contain uyayak (a local seasoning).

== Overview ==
The oilless soup is made up of two main meats; goat or chicken, which are also called "Afiaefereebot" and "afiaefereunen", meaning white soup with goat and white soup with chicken respectively.

Other ingredients used in making the soup include uyayak, Ehu (Calabash nutmeg), uziza leaves, and crayfish.

== See also ==
- Nsala soup
- Efik people
- Ikot Udo Abia
