= Homowo =

Traditional festival in Ghana by the Ga people

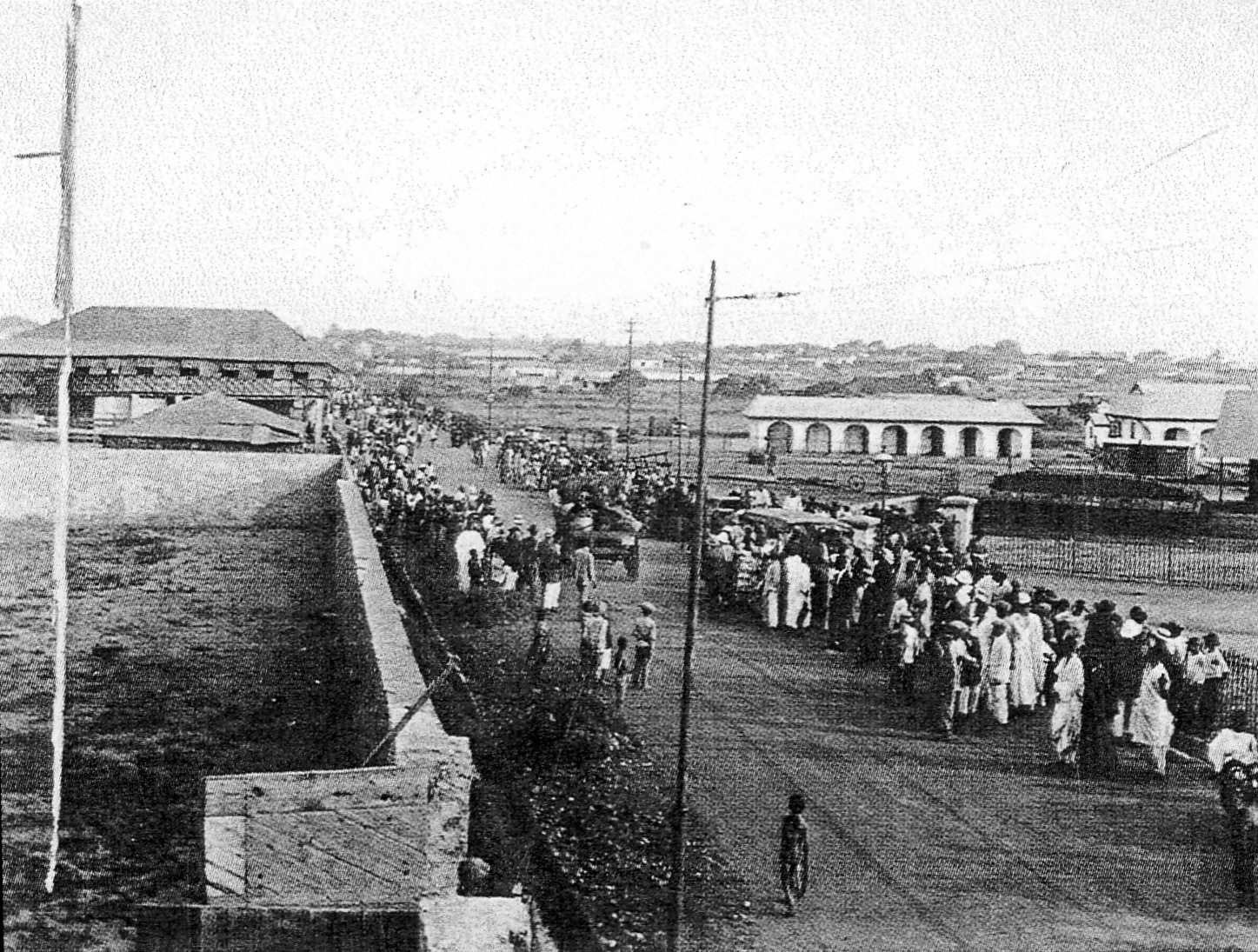
A street in Accra. Many people from nearby neighborhoods and the surrounding area flock to the city center in order to attend the celebration of the Homowo Festival, the annual main festival of the Ga, around 1900.

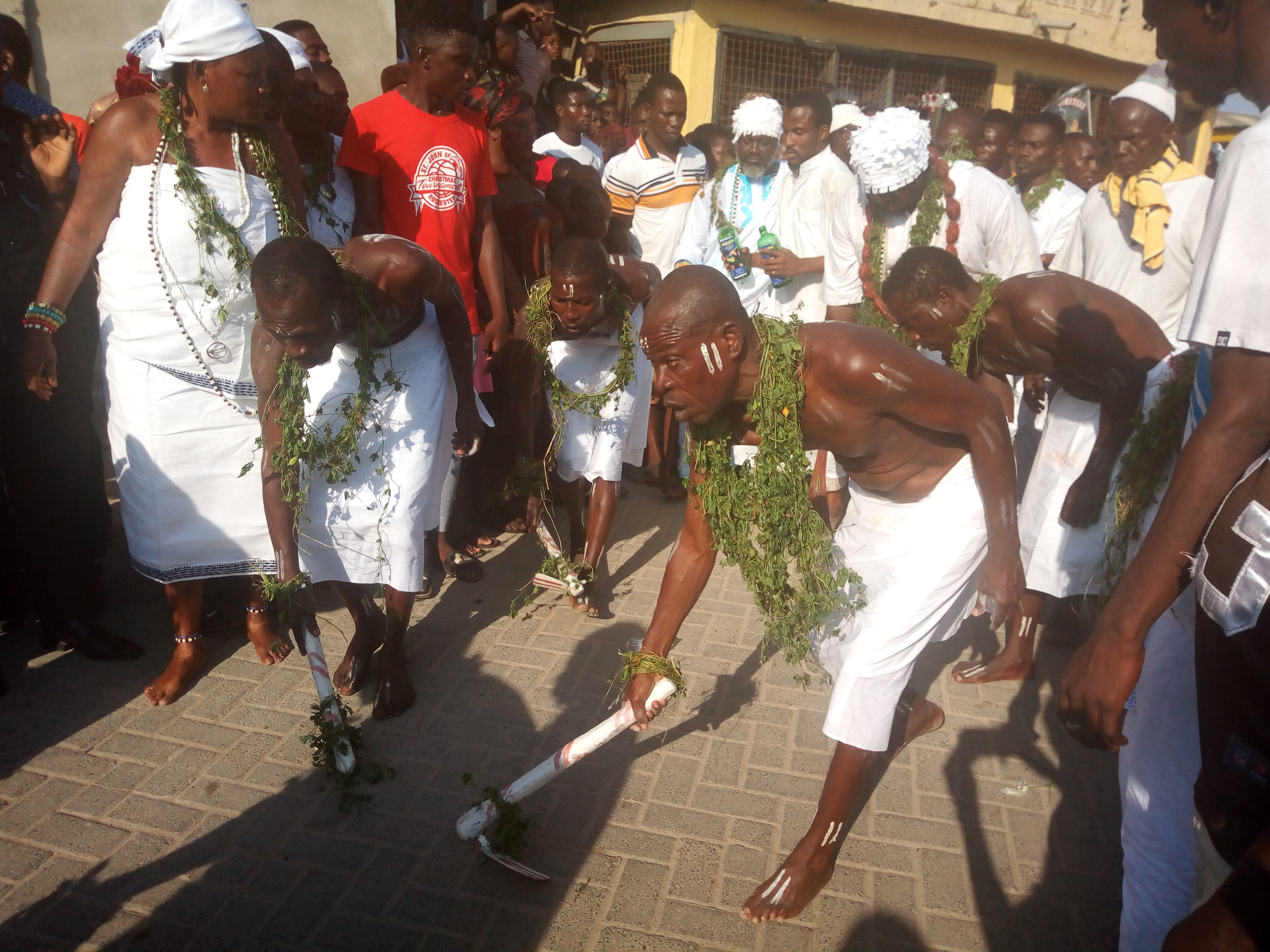
Teshie Homowo Festival ban on singing & drumming ritual ceremony

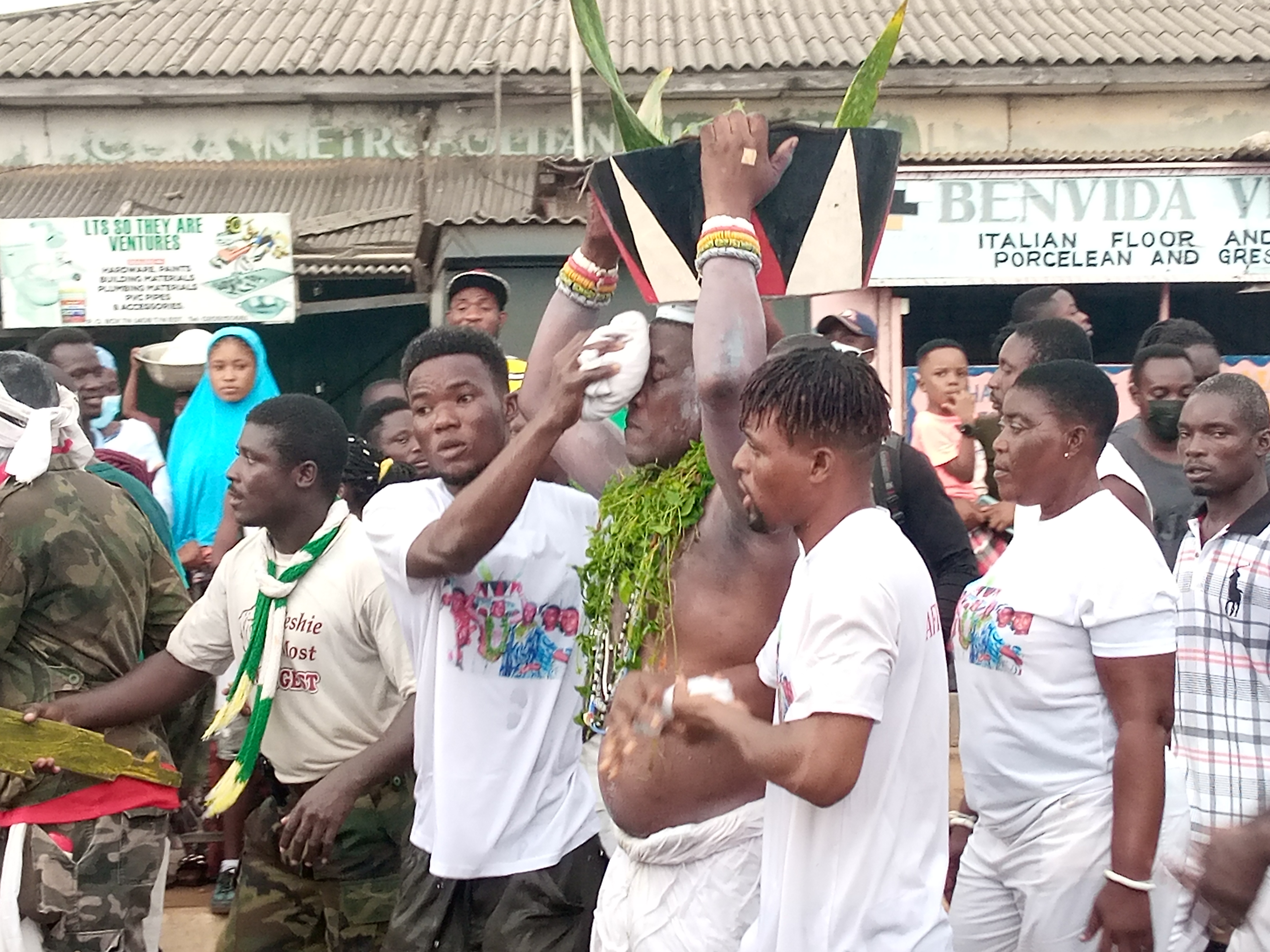
Homowo festival rituals

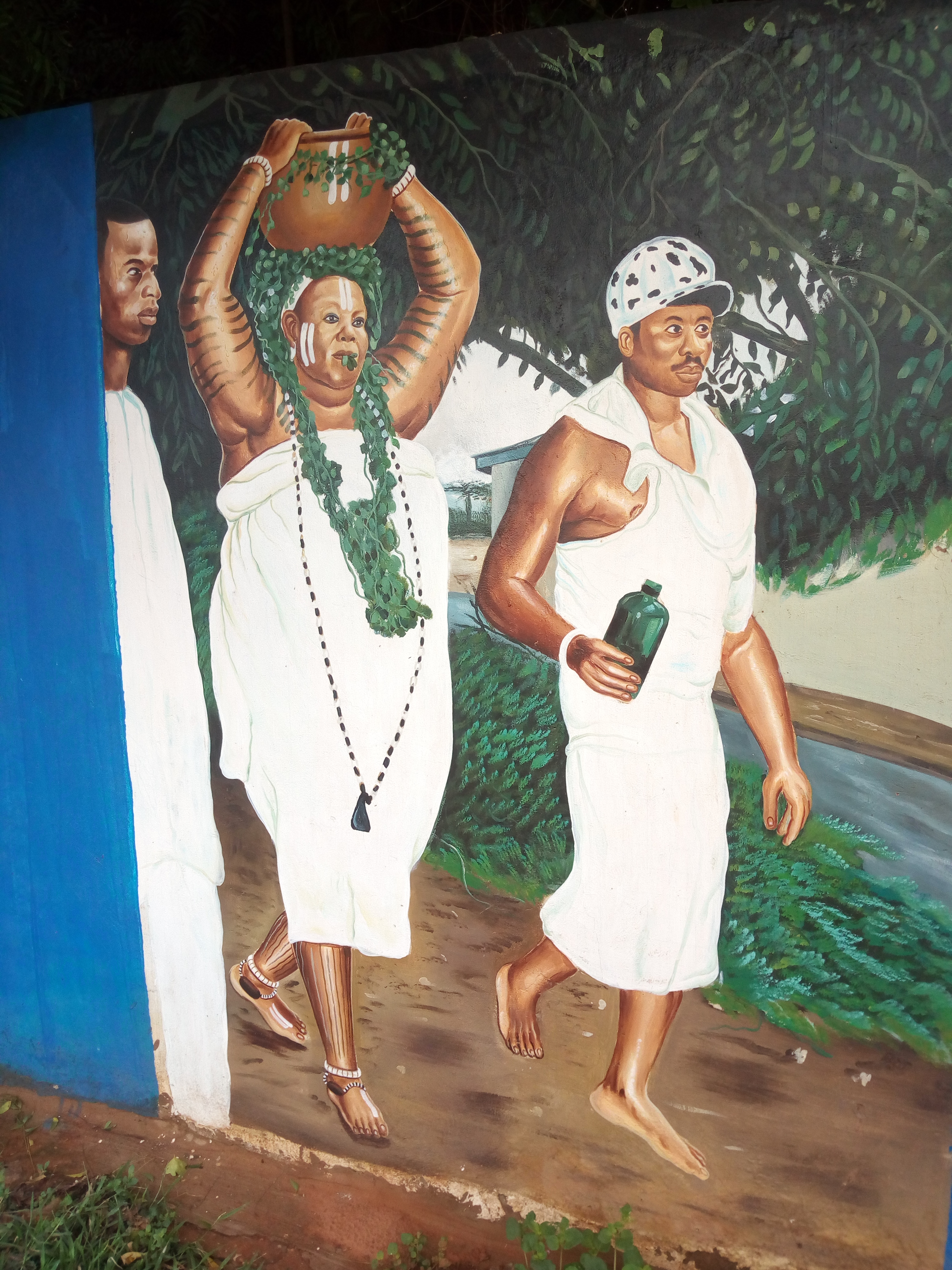
Nungua Homowo Festival painting

Homowo is a festival celebrated by the Ga people of Ghana in the Greater Accra Region. The festival starts at the end of April into May with the planting of crops (mainly millet) before the rainy season starts. The Ga people celebrate Homowo in the remembrance of famine that once happened in their history in precolonial Ghana. The Ga Homowo or Harvest Custom is an annual tradition among the Accra people, with its origin tied to the Native Calendar and the Lante Dzan We people of the Asere Quarter. Asere is a sub-division of the Ga Division in the Accra District of the Gold Coast Colony.

== Etymology and origin ==
The word Homowo (homo - hunger, wo - hoot) can mean "to hoot (or jeer) at hunger" in the Ga language. It is said that as the Ga people traveled to Ghana, they faced famine and other misfortunes along the way and upon settlement. The people attributed their mishaps and misfortunes to the displeasure of a god or deity. To restore balance in their society, the Ga people sacrificed livestock, prayed and poured libations to pacify the gods or deities.

An intriguing aspect of the Ga Homowo tradition is the dual celebrations that occur within the Lante Dzan We community. The tradition suggests that, in the Ga people's history, the Paramount Chief or Ga Mantse temporarily left Accra for eastern Ga territories. During his absence, the community, under the authority of the Priest of the Dantu Fetish, conducted the Homowo Harvest Custom, complete with the customary rituals. Upon the Ga Mantse's return, a second Homowo Harvest Festival was held, in which all Ga people were encouraged to participate. This second celebration, while commemorating the Ga Mantse's return, became an integral part of Ga cultural history.

It is important to clarify that while two Ga Homowo celebrations appear to transpire within a single year, the original and authentic Ga Homowo is the first one, known as the Damte Dsanwe Homowo. This celebration marks the culmination of the native year and aligns with native law and custom.

== Pre-festival ==
Homowo is celebrated in all the cities in the Ga state with celebrations climaxing in Gamashie. Prior to the actual celebration of the festival, Nmaadumo, a sowing rite of wheat takes place to mark the beginning of the Ga Calendar and the celebrations that occur within it. Nmaa or millet is sown by the seven priests of the Gamashie people who perform Shibaa, the rite of digging. The priests sow the wheat in a specific order with Dantu on Monday, Sakumo on Tuesday, Naa Korle and Naa Afieye on Friday, Gua on Saturday, Naa Dede on Sunday, and Nai on the following Tuesday. During wheat-sowing, a strict ban on noise called Koninfemo is set in place. This is to ensure that the crops grow without distractions. This lasts for four weeks and two days, and at the end of this period, specific drum beatings called Odadaa are played to announce the end of the noise-making ban.

== Timeline and dates ==
The native calendar of the Ga people is provided yearly by the Damte Fetish Priest of the Damte Dsanwe people. The Ga Native Year commences either on the last Monday of April or the first or second Monday of May. This period is when the Nmaadumo takes place, and marks the beginning of the Homowo season which ends in September after the crops are harvested. The start of the year is determined by either counting days or weeks from the initial day designated by the Dantu Priest as the inaugural day of the Native Year. At times, often midway or near the end of the year, the Dantu Priest may shift the Calendar either forward or backward by a week or two. This adjustment can be made either by the directive of the Ga Mantse or at the discretion of the Dantu Priest, often without a specific reason. Consequently, the Calendar is not fixed, leading to variations in the timing of the Homowo Festival.

A week and five days after Odadaa is played, the Twins Yam Festival begins, and five weeks and four days later, the celebrations of Homowo begin. Different cities celebrate their Homowo at different dates, with Lante Dzanwe beginning, followed by Tema six days later. Nungua, however, begins celebrating Homowo soon after Odadaa is played on the first Sunday in July. The general Homowo celebration of the entire Gamashie (from Osu, Accra to Teshie) begins eight days after Tema, and ten days after, Nungo and Gboogbla begin their part of the festival. The last place to celebrate the festival is Awutu four days later.

=== Soobii ===
Celebrators living and working in neighboring towns and villages are called Soobii (Thursday people) as they arrive on Thursday to join other Ga people in celebrating Homowo during the Homowo week at Gamashie. Once the Soobii people arrive at the city for the festival, they diverge into their localities to march together.

=== Twins Yam Festival ===
The Twins Yam Festival falls on the Friday following the Gamashie area Homowo celebration and before the main Homowo celebration on Saturday. On this day, twin Ga people wear white and celebrate with feastings, music, and dancing. This festival stems from the Ga belief that twins live different lives compared to their non-twins counterparts and behave differently. On this day, a pair of buffalo horns that are typically preserved in a shrine are brought out to be used for ritual ceremonies. The twins are expected to wear the same clothing, share their gifts, and react similarly in given situations.

Typically, the Homowo Festival is observed in August, occasionally falling in July or September. It is noted that in 1888, the entire Accra community celebrated the Homowo Festival as late as September 27 or 29th.

The key milestones of the Native Year include:

- 1st day (Monday): The Ga year begins on the first Monday after the Saturday feast. This practice is rooted in the belief that starting on Saturday is inauspicious. On this day, the Dantu Priest observes his Grand Custom by feasting and creating specific leaf mixtures in a traditional bowl. These mixtures are then taken by adherents and the Damte Dsanwe family, who sprinkle water with the leaves and share visits with one another.
- 2nd day (Tuesday): This marks the preparation for the general Homowo Harvest Festival. Fishing is halted, and in certain regions, farming activities cease.
- 3rd day (Wednesday): Considered inauspicious, no significant tasks are undertaken on this day.
- 4th day (Thursday): Farmers refrain from working, and some areas prohibit any farming activities according to native law and custom. Preparations continue for the general Harvest Festival.
- 5th day (Friday): Farmers rest on this day as per Native Law and Custom.
- 6th day (Saturday): Notably uneventful, this day lacks significant occurrences until the 11th day.
- 11th day (Thursday): Villagers and townspeople gather in Accra Town for the Homowo Festival. An evening gong signals the prohibition of debt collection, legal actions, and claims until the conclusion of the Homowo Festival. Violations of these injunctions are met with penalties.

The climax of the festival arrives on the 13th day, Saturday, with a grand feast where palm soup and kpokpoi are prepared and enjoyed. On the 14th day, Sunday, visits are exchanged, and the people engage in various practices to commemorate the departed and express well-wishes for the New Year.

Overall, the Native Year and its associated customs are deeply interwoven with the Ga culture, reflecting both practical considerations and spiritual beliefs.

== Celebration ==
The Homowo Festival features several cultural elements, including rituals and traditions that hold historical significance. The closing and opening of the Korle Lagoon for fishing are central components. The Korle Priest performs ceremonies involving libations, prayers, and the removal of palm leaves to mark the cycles of opening and closing the lagoon.

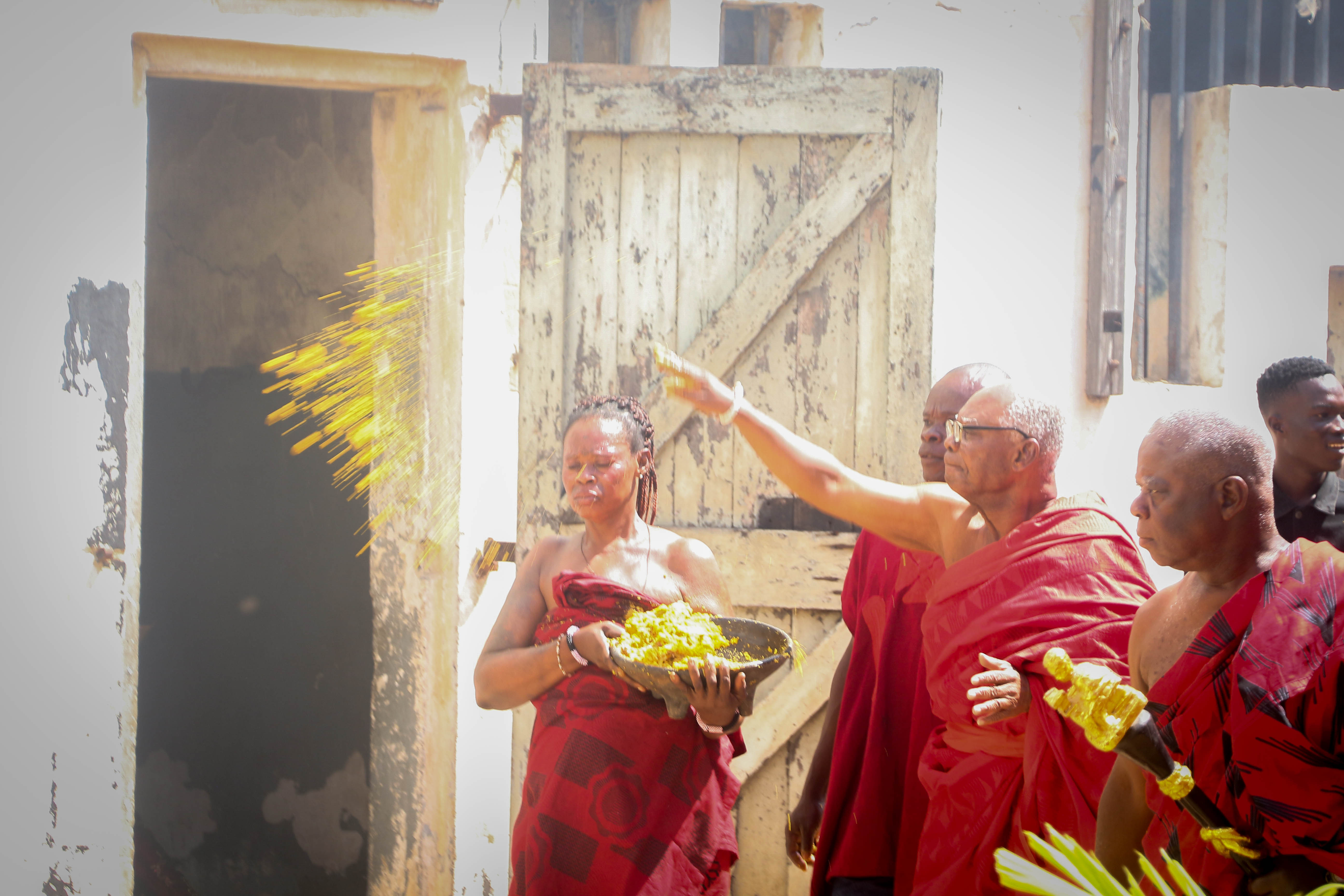
Traditional chief sprinkling kpokpoi (food) on the ground

Traditional celebration of Homowo includes marching across cities while drumming, singling, and dancing. This celebration is further multiplied during the Gamashie Homowo celebration as the Soobii people join in. They sing songs with lyrics such as "Nmaayi eye" (the harvest is white/plentiful) to celebrate fruitful harvests. The celebration continues into the early hours of Friday when preparation for cooking begins.

=== Rites ===
==== Shaayo Laitso Kee ====
This rite involves housewives presenting logs to mothers-in-law. This act marks the cordial relationship between a daughter-in-law and mother-in-law. This rite is also exchanged between sons-in-law and fathers-in-law. The logs are used to make bonfires for the souls of dead relatives that are said to have arrived during Soobii.

==== Akpade rite ====
This rite involves plastering two side doors with red clay (Akpade) on the Friday of the Twins Yam Festival. This act is carried out by the elderly women of families, however the elderly men of the families fire musket bullets to expel evil spirits on the same day.

==== Libation ====
The head of the family traditionally sprinkles kpoikpoi (a process called "Nishwamo") and pours drinks to the ground to honor ancestors following the preparation of Homowo food on Saturday.

===== Prayer during libation =====
- Noowala Noowala (Long life Long Life)
- Afi naa akpe wo (May the new year bring us together)
- Gbii kpaanyo anina wo (May we live to see the eighth day)
- Woye Gbo ni woye Gboenaa (May we eat the fruits of Gbo and that of Gboenaa)
- Wofee moomo (May we live long)
- Alonte din ko aka-fo woten (May no black cat (ill omen) come between us)
- Wosee afi bene wotrashi neke nonu noon (May sit like this the next year)
- Tswa Tswa tswa Omanye aba (Hai! Hail! Hail! May peace be)

== Cuisine ==
Cooking for Homowo Saturday begins around 4am on Saturday in most Ga homes to ensure it is ready for sprinkling at 7am.

=== Kpokpoi ===
Kpokpoi is prepared from the millet that is grown by the seven priests during Nmaadumo. It is turned into dough and eventually steamed. Once it cooks, it is kneaded in a wooden bowl and mixed with palm-oil and cooked okra. During the celebration on Saturday, people go around many Ga households in the Gamashie area to share the festal food with them. On this day there is traffic and roads are blocked off to accommodate the festival. The ingredients for making Kpekpele are simple and few; ground corn/maize, palm-oil, onions, salt, and in some Ga houses there is the inclusion of okra.

== Diaspora ==
Ga people living in Portland, Oregon host the "Portland Homowo & Twins Festival" to celebrate alongside their native counterparts. In 2011, the Ga community in the UK took a laudable initiative to join in on the Homowo celebration.

== Gallery ==
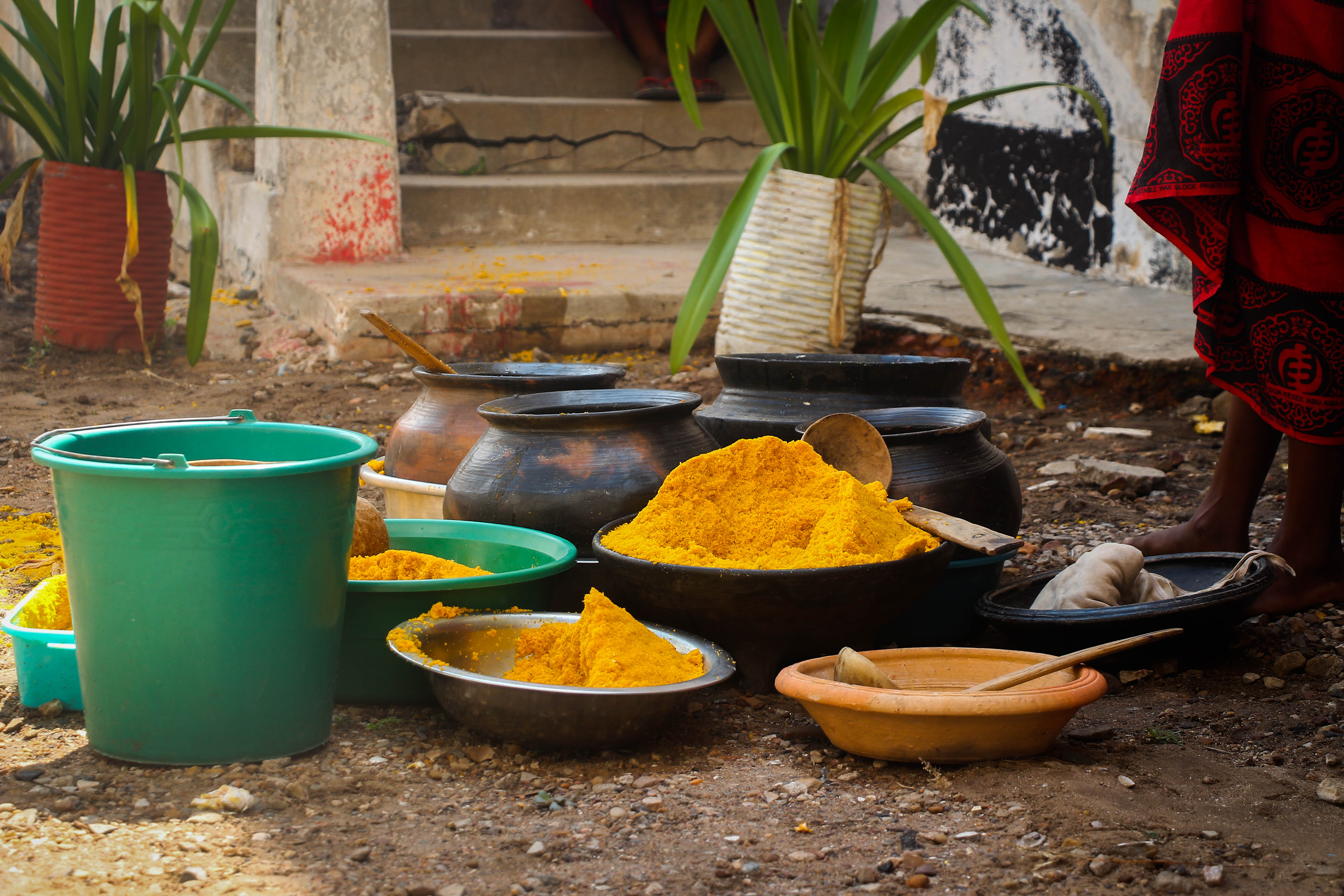
The Ga people celebrate Homowo Festival in the remembrance of the famine that once happened in their history in precolonial Ghana.

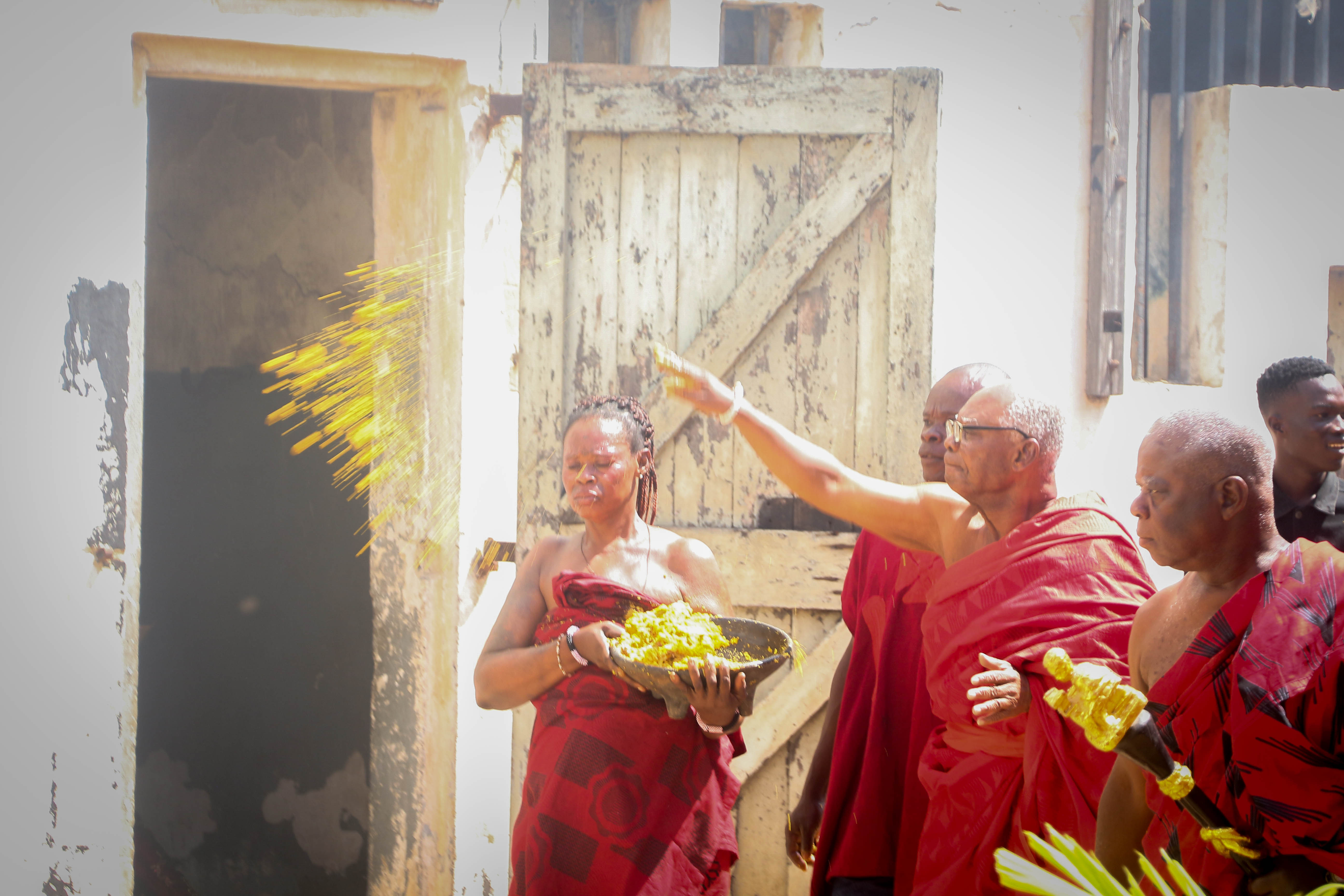
Homowo Festival

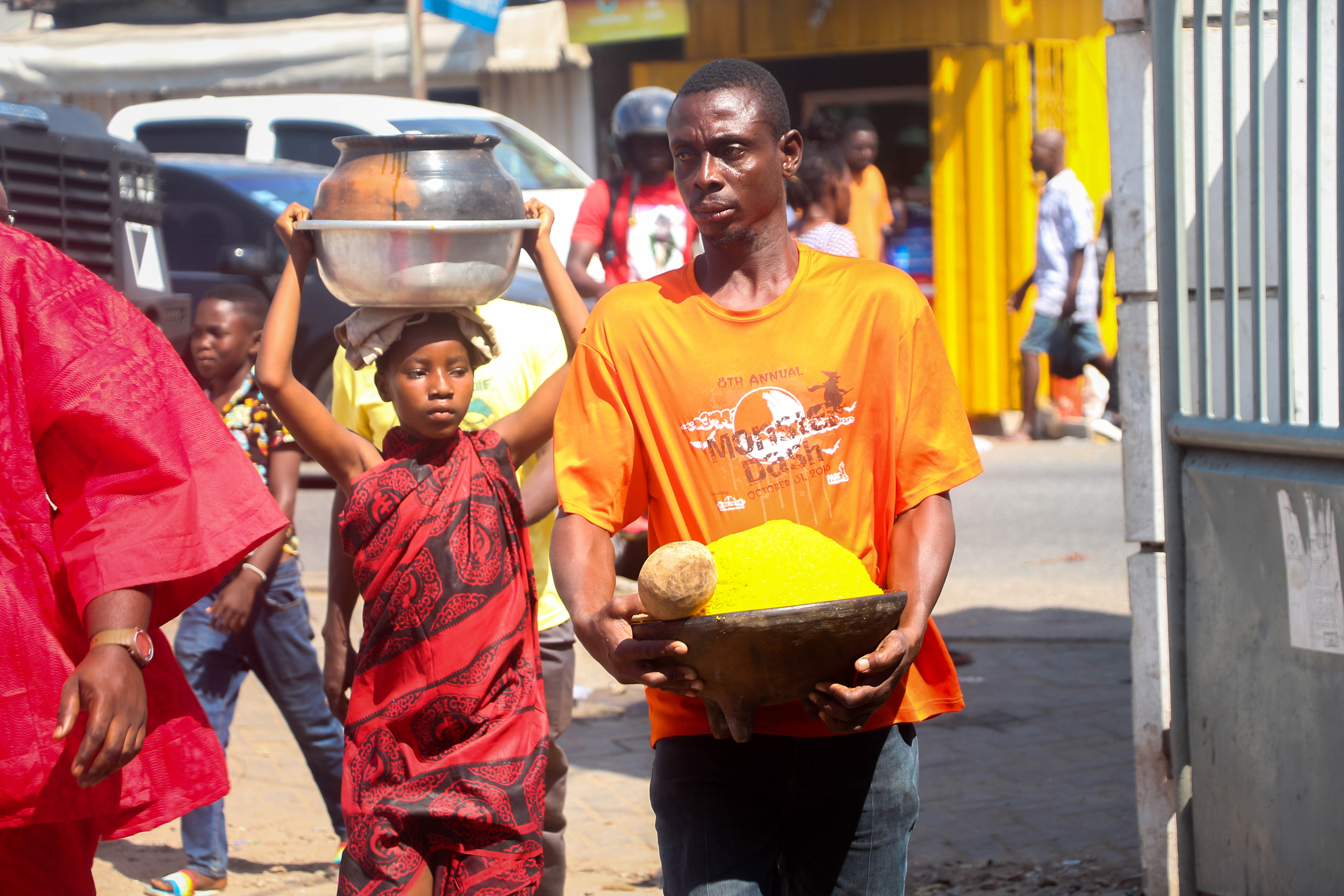
Homowo Festival

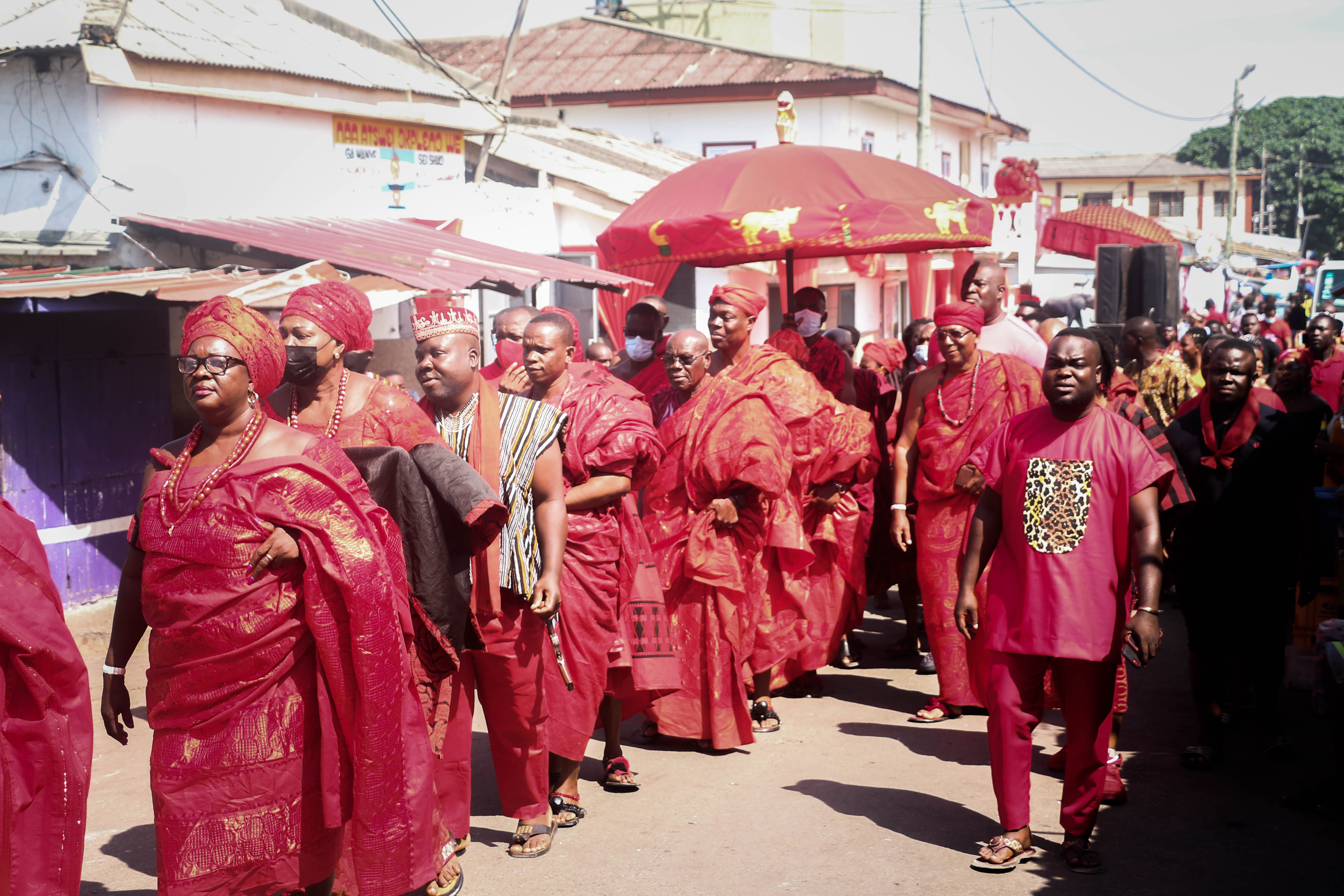
Homowo Festival

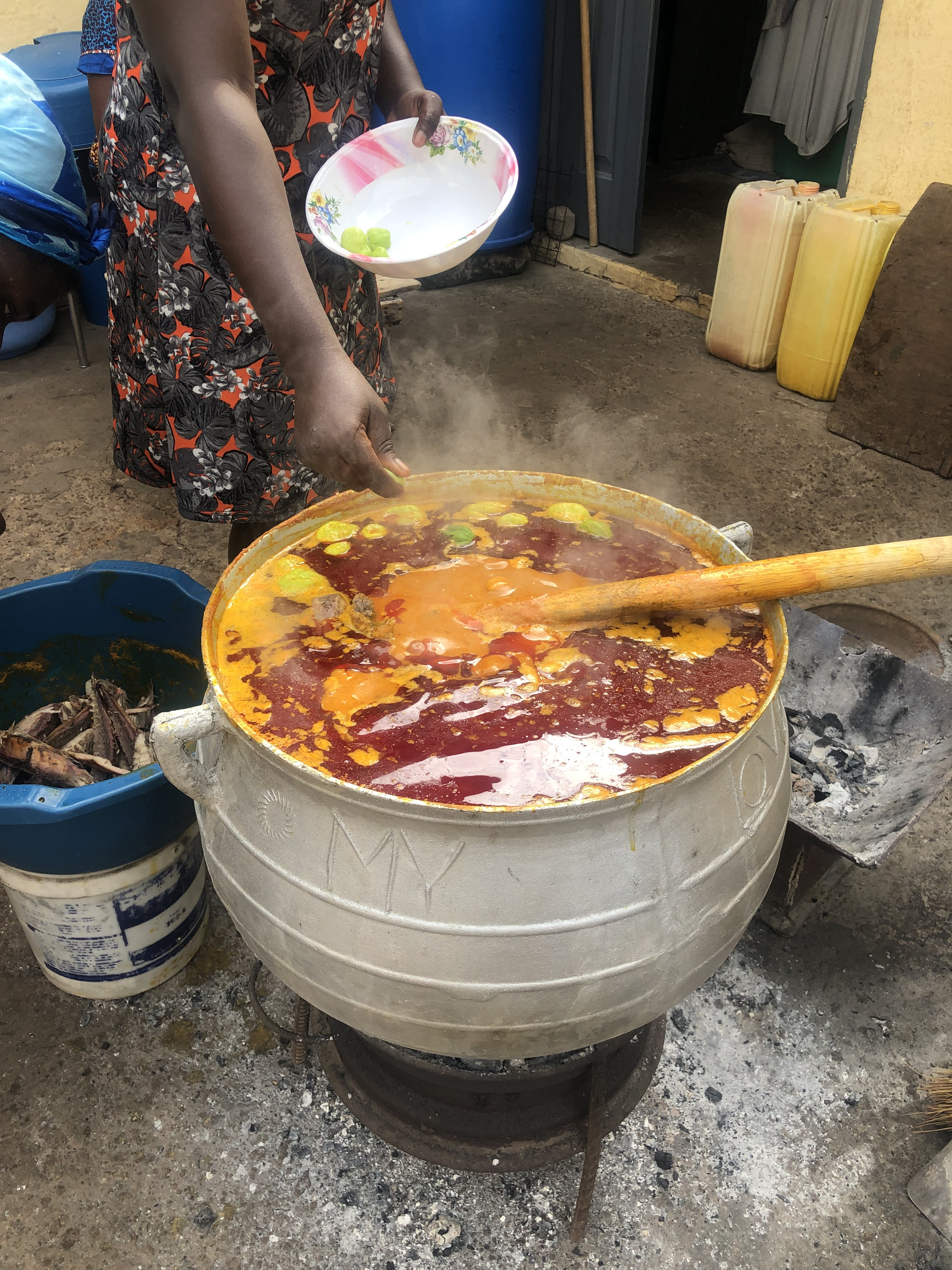
Homowo Festival palm nut soup

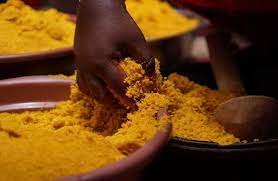
Kpekple

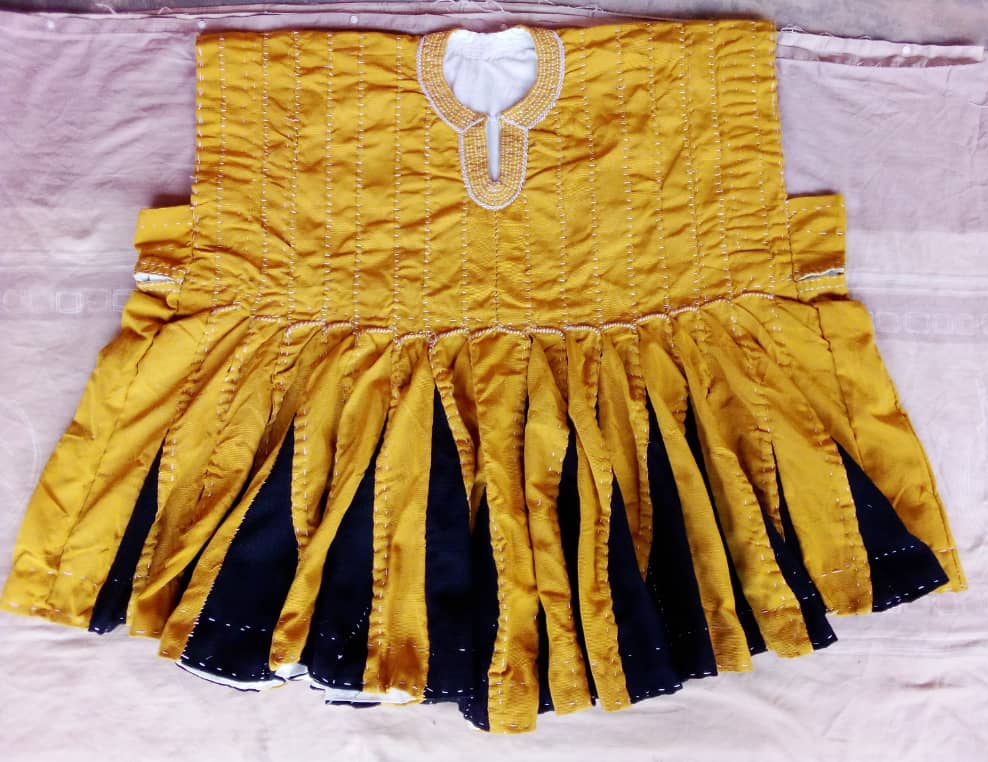
Brown and Black Smock From Northern Ghana

== See also ==
- Culture of Ghana
