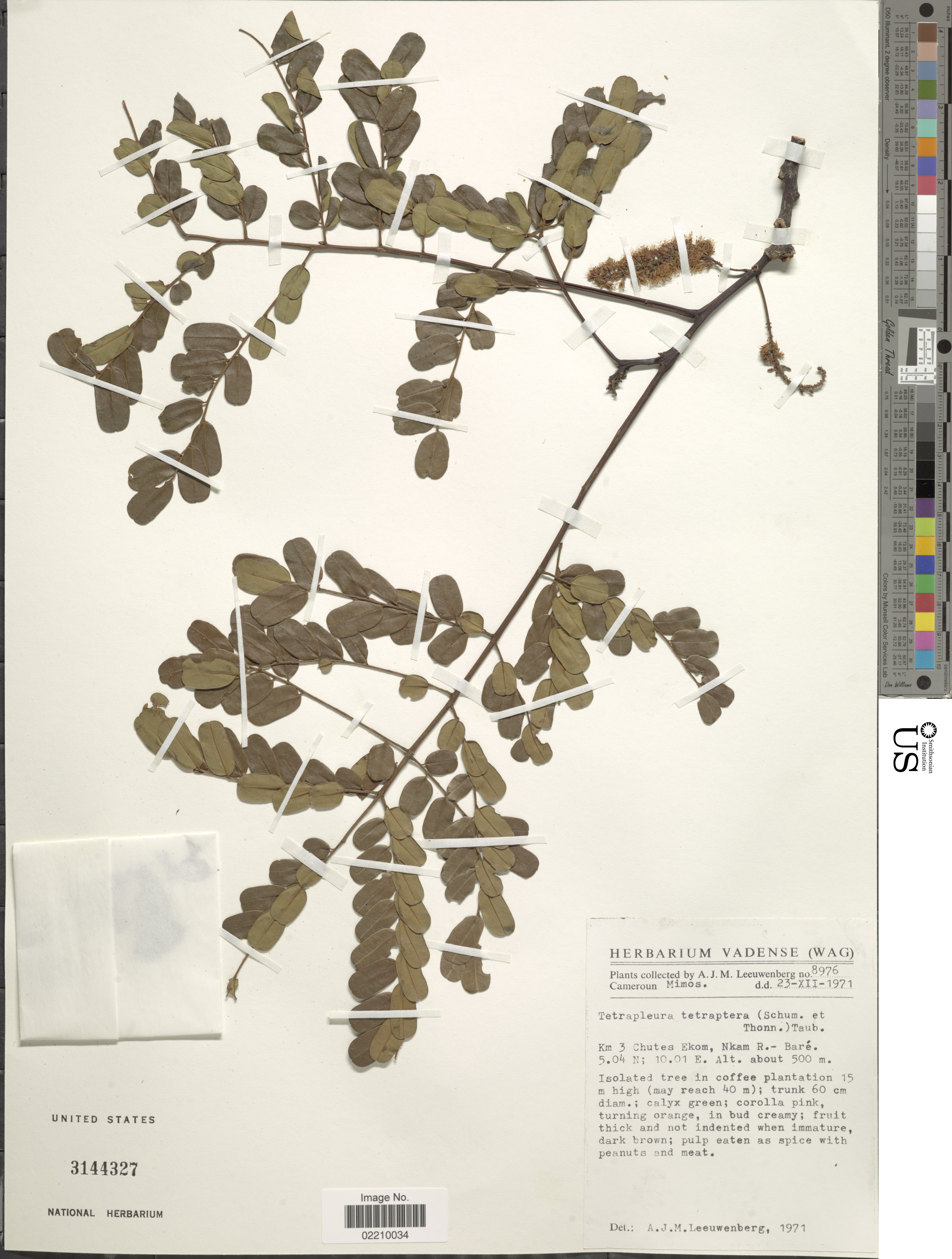

Scientific classification
- Kingdom: Plantae
- Clade: Tracheophytes
- Clade: Angiosperms
- Clade: Eudicots
- Clade: Rosids
- Order: Fabales
- Family: Fabaceae
- Subfamily: Caesalpinioideae
- Clade: Mimosoid clade
- Genus: Tetrapleura
- Species: T. tetraptera

Binomial name
- Tetrapleura tetraptera (Schumach. & Thonn.) Taub.

= Tetrapleura tetraptera =

Species of legume

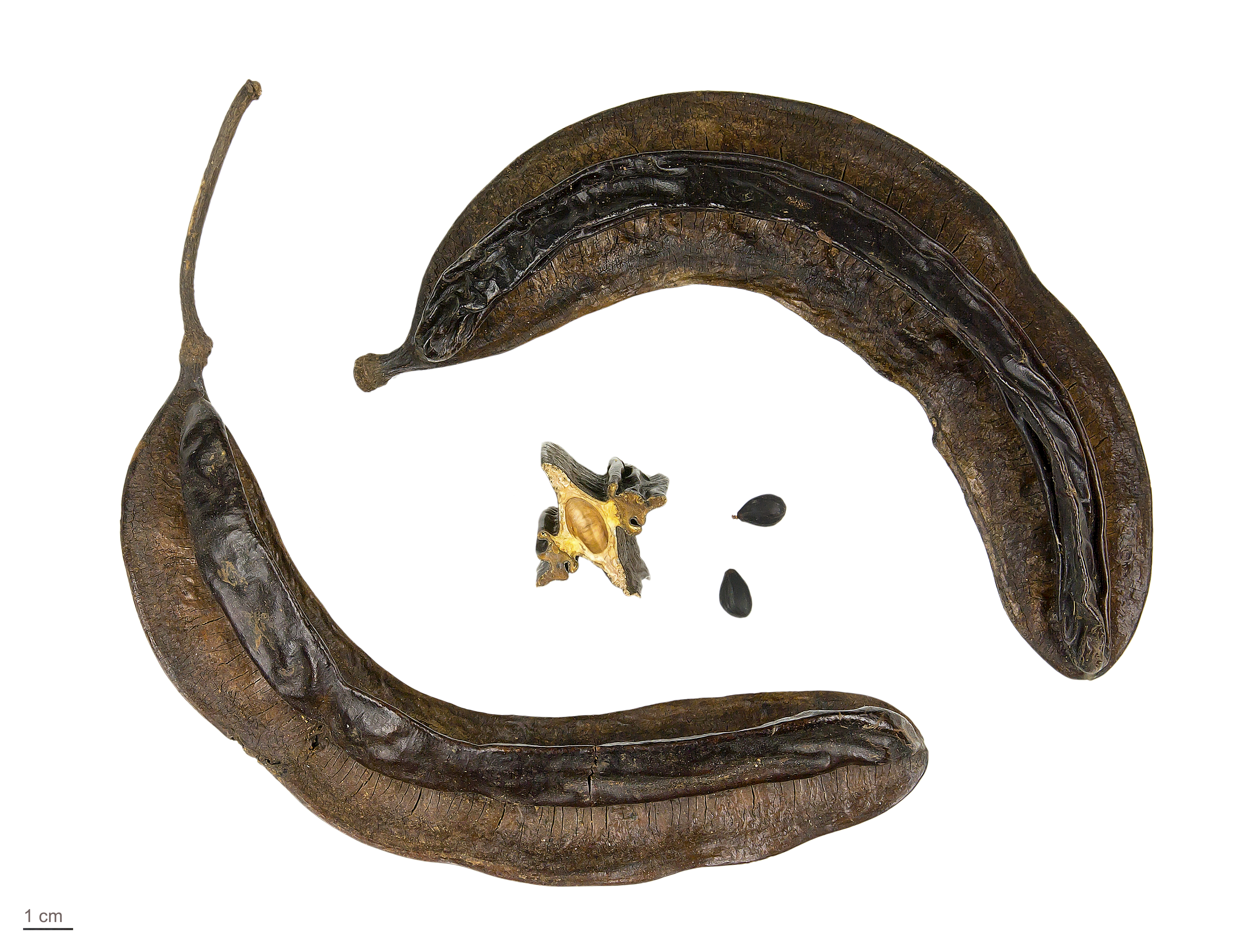
Tetrapleura tetraptera - MHNT

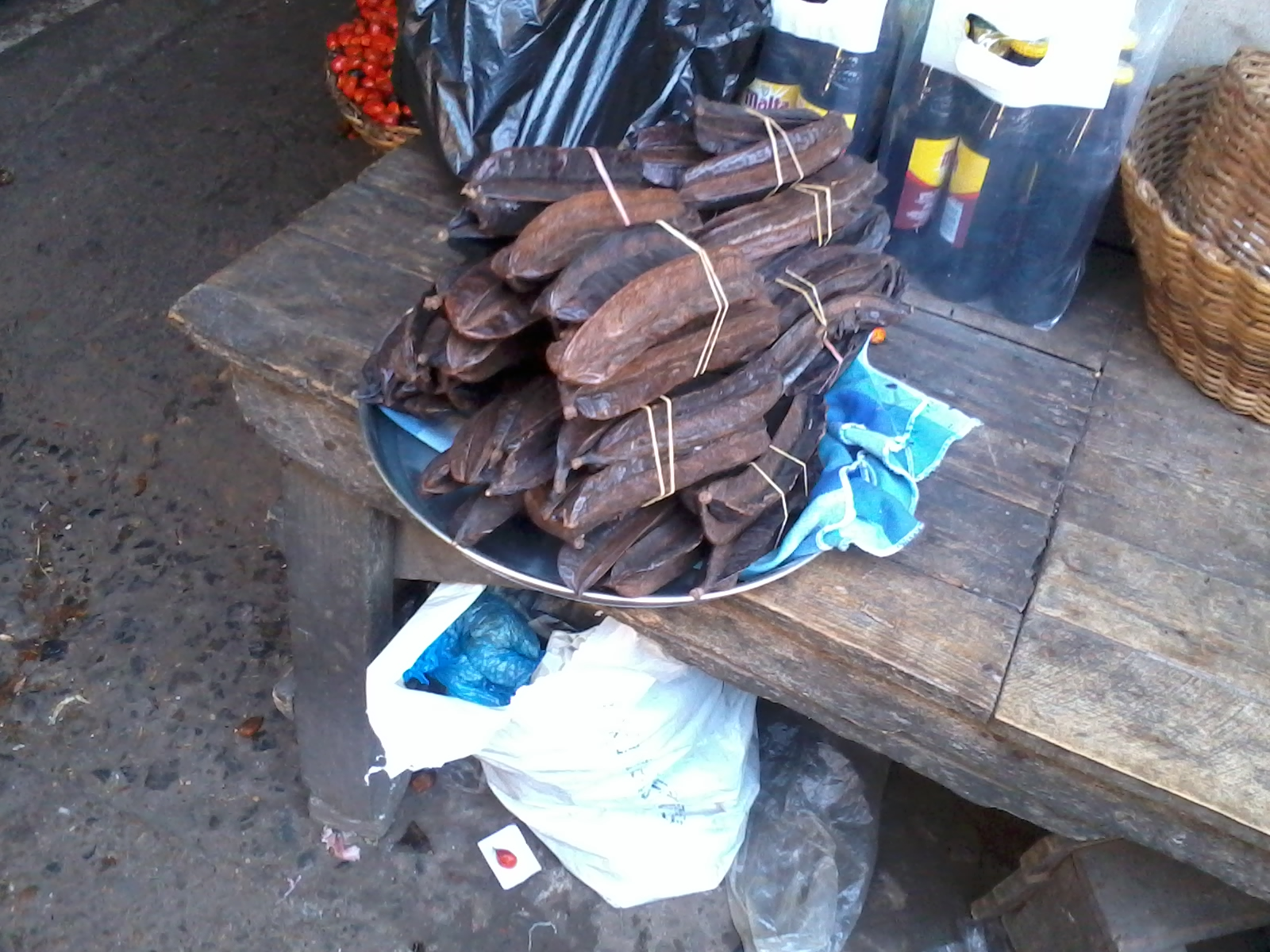

Tetrapleura tetraptera, also known as prekese, aidan fruit, or four corner spice, is a species of flowering plant in the family Fabaceae native to Western Africa and Central Africa. The plant is called prekese (or, more correctly, prɛkɛsɛ aka soup perfume) in the Akan language of Ghana. It is also called uhio (uhiokrihio) in the Igbo language of Nigeria.

The tree has many uses. Its sweet fragrance is valued, and its fruit is used to spice dishes, such as Banga soup. It is mostly used to prepare palm nut soup and other types of soups called light soup because of its aroma.

== Description ==
A medium grey barked deciduous tree that can grow up to 25 m tall, the trunk is slender and straight while the slash is reddish and scented. Its leaves are bipinnately compound, up to 5 - 9 of mostly opposite pinnae and each pinnae having 12 - 24 leaflets. Leaflets alternate, can reach 2 cm long and 1 cm wide, they are narrowly oblong to elliptic in shape and rounded at both the apex and the base. The inflorescence is arranged in spike-like axillary racemes with the flowers pinkish cream to orange brown in color. Its fruit is a shiny dark brown to almost black pod with four wing like ridges, two hard and woody ridges and two rather soft ridges, the latter two has an edible pulp. The fruit typically hangs at the edges of branches and inside the pod are tiny rattling black to brownish seeds.

== Distribution ==
Native to Tropical Africa, from Senegal in West Africa to Sudan and Kenya and southwards to Tanzania and Angola.
