= Kpekpele =

Food eaten by the Gas during Homowo

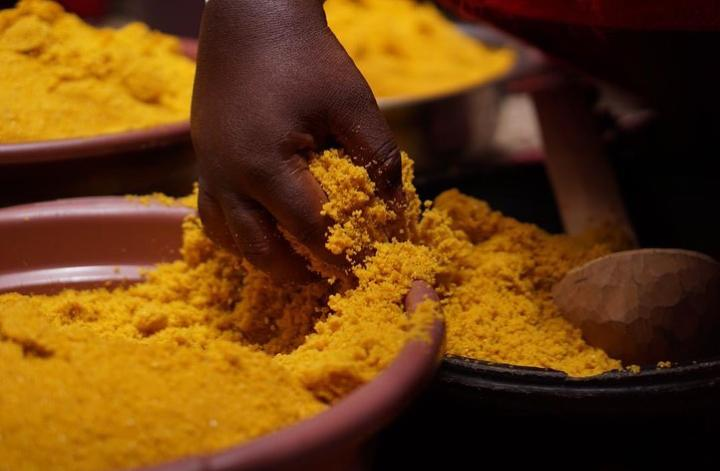
- Alternative names: Kɔ
- Course: Food
- Place of origin: Ghana
- Created by: Ga's
- Serving temperature: Hot or cold
- Main ingredients: corn meal eaten with palm nut soup, kwown as ŋme wonu in the Ga language

Kpekple (also referred to as kpokpoi) is a kind of food eaten by the Gas of Ghana during the celebration of the Homowo festival, which is to hoot at hunger. It is prepared with the primary ingredients of steamed and fermented corn meal, palm nut soup and smoked fish. Kpekple is usually sprinkled around by the chief believing that the ancestors would be pleased by the offering.

== Ingredients ==
- Corn meal
- Palm fruit
- Onions
- Pepper
- Water
- Tomatoes
- Okro
- Fish
- Salt

== See also ==
- List of porridges
- List of soups
