= Ofe onugbu =

Traditional soup of Igbo people, Nigeria

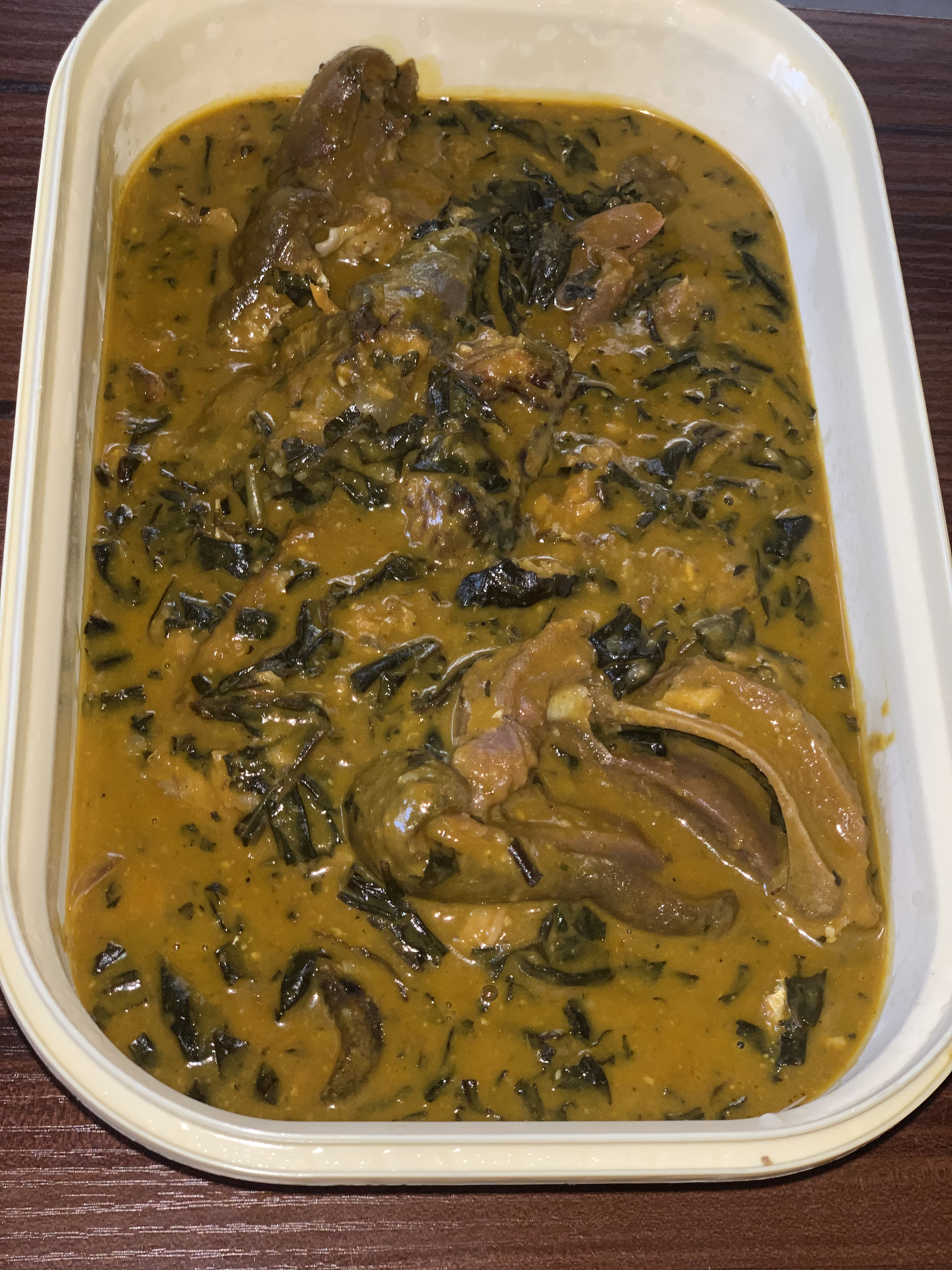
- Ofe Onugbu
- Type: Soup
- Place of origin: Southeast Nigeria (Igbo)
- Region or state: South East
- Serving temperature: Warm
- Main ingredients: Bitter Leaves Vernonia amygdalina; Ede uri; Ogiri Igbo; Meat, fish, stockfish
- Ingredients generally used: Crayfish

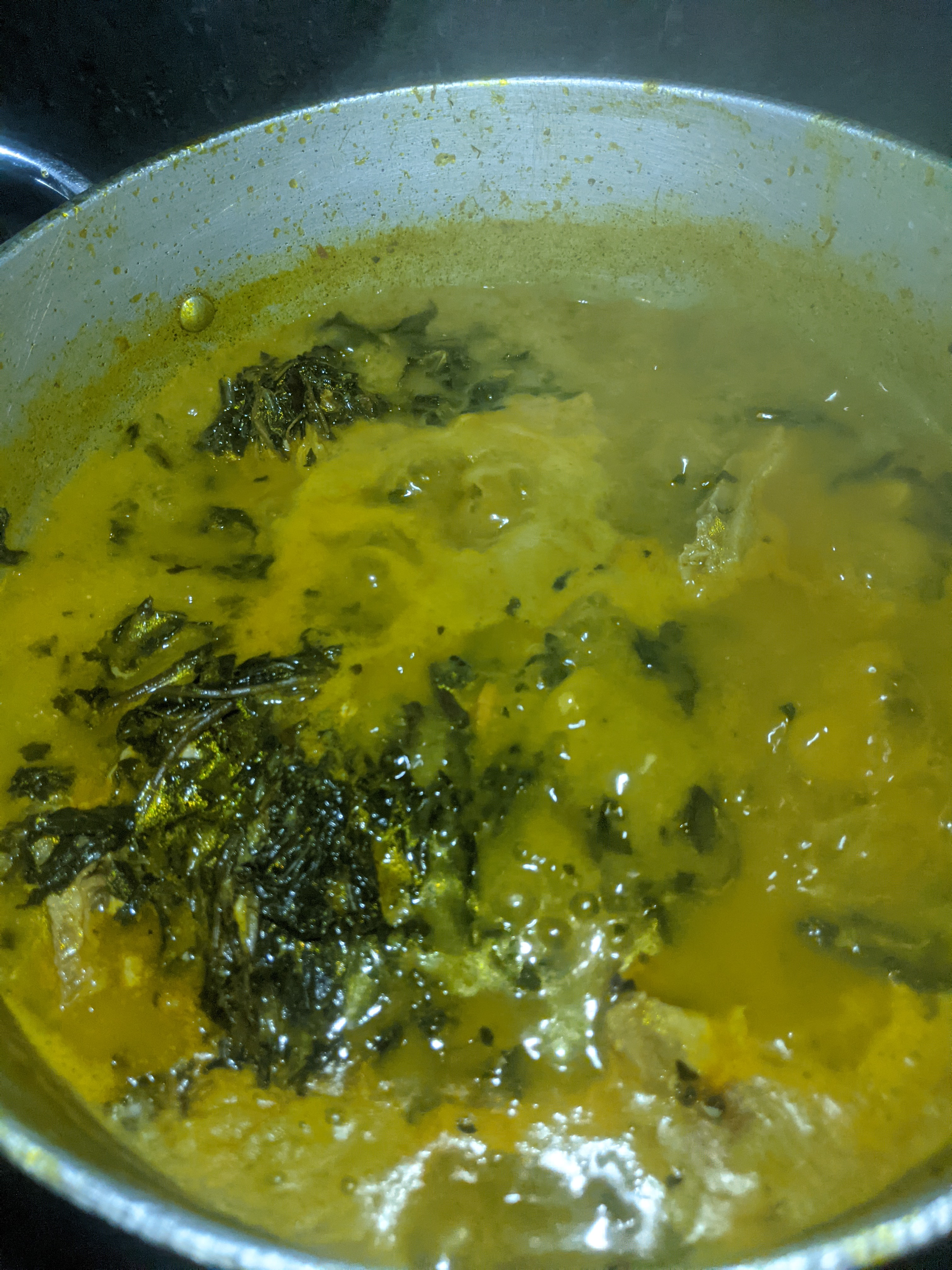
Ofe onugbu

Ofe onugbu, (Igbo: [ɔ́fɛ́ ɔ̀nʊ́g͡bù]) also known as bitterleaf soup, is a traditional delicacy of the Igbo people in the southeastern region of Nigeria. It is regarded as a native soup. Although it is called 'bitterleaf soup,' the dish is not necessarily an inherently bitter soup, as the leaves are thoroughly washed to reduce the bitterness before cooking. The dish is commonly eaten with Ụtara a carbohydrate-based staples such as akpụ, Ụtara akpu, Ụtara ji, Garri, and other similar staples. The leaf is also known scientifically as Vernonia amygdalina.

== Origin ==
Ofe Onugbu is widely regarded as a traditional delicacy of the Igbo people in southeastern Nigeria. The soup, made primarily from bitterleaf (onugbu), holds cultural significance across many Igbo communities and is commonly prepared for family meals, celebrations, and special occasions. Although closely associated with Anambra cuisine, several variations of the soup exist across the region. These differences may include:

- The use of achi or cocoyam as a thickener,
- The preference for long leaf strands or finely shredded bitterleaf,
- The use of extracted palm fruit juice or palm oil, and
- The choice to cook the soup with or without ogiri, a fermented seasoning that adds a distinctive flavor.

== See also ==
- List of soups
- Ofe nsala
- Ofe achara
- Ofe akwụ
