= Ofe akwụ =

Traditional soup of the Igbo people, Nigeria

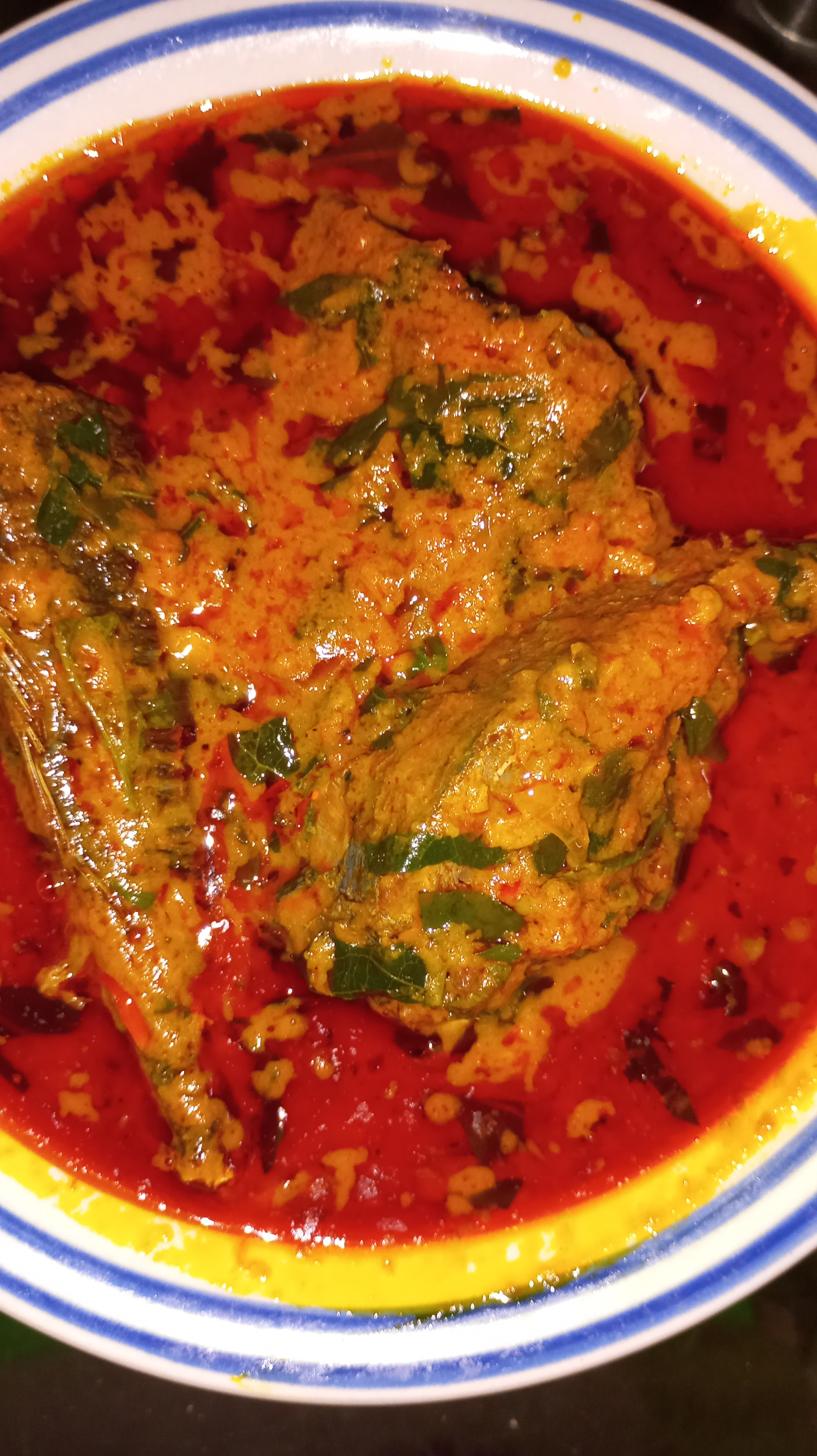
- Ofe akwu
- Place of origin: Southeast Nigeria (Igboland)
- Region or state: South East
- Serving temperature: Warm
- Main ingredients: Palm Nut; Meat; Smoked fish; Stock fish; Ugu; Scent Leaf; Crayfish
- Ingredients generally used: ogiri okpeye
- Other information: Commonly served with rice

Ofe akwụ (Igbo: [ɔ́fɛ́ àkʷʊ̀]) is a traditional soup of the Igbo people in the southeastern region of Nigeria. It is commonly served with white rice, which is the most popular accompaniment, though it may also be enjoyed with agidi or other staples. The defining feature of ofe akwụ is its rich, reddish-brown base made from freshly extracted palm fruit juice, which gives the dish its unique taste, aroma, and colour. The soup is widely consumed across Igbo communities and is regarded as both an everyday meal and a special delicacy served during festive occasions.

== Origin ==
Ofe akwụ originated from the Igbo people in southeastern Nigeria.

== Overview ==
It's a palm nut stew that can also be enjoyed with yam and boiled plantains. The main ingredients used in its preparations include:

- Palm nuts
- Assorted meats (beef and tripe)
- Dried Fish
- Smoked mackerel (Titus fish)
- Seasoning cubes
- Onions
- Cray fish
- Ogiri okpei
- Pepper
- Scent leaves
- Fluted pumpkin leaves (Ugu)

== See also ==
- Ofe onugbu
- Ofe nsala
- Ofe achara
- Ofe Owerri

== Gallery ==
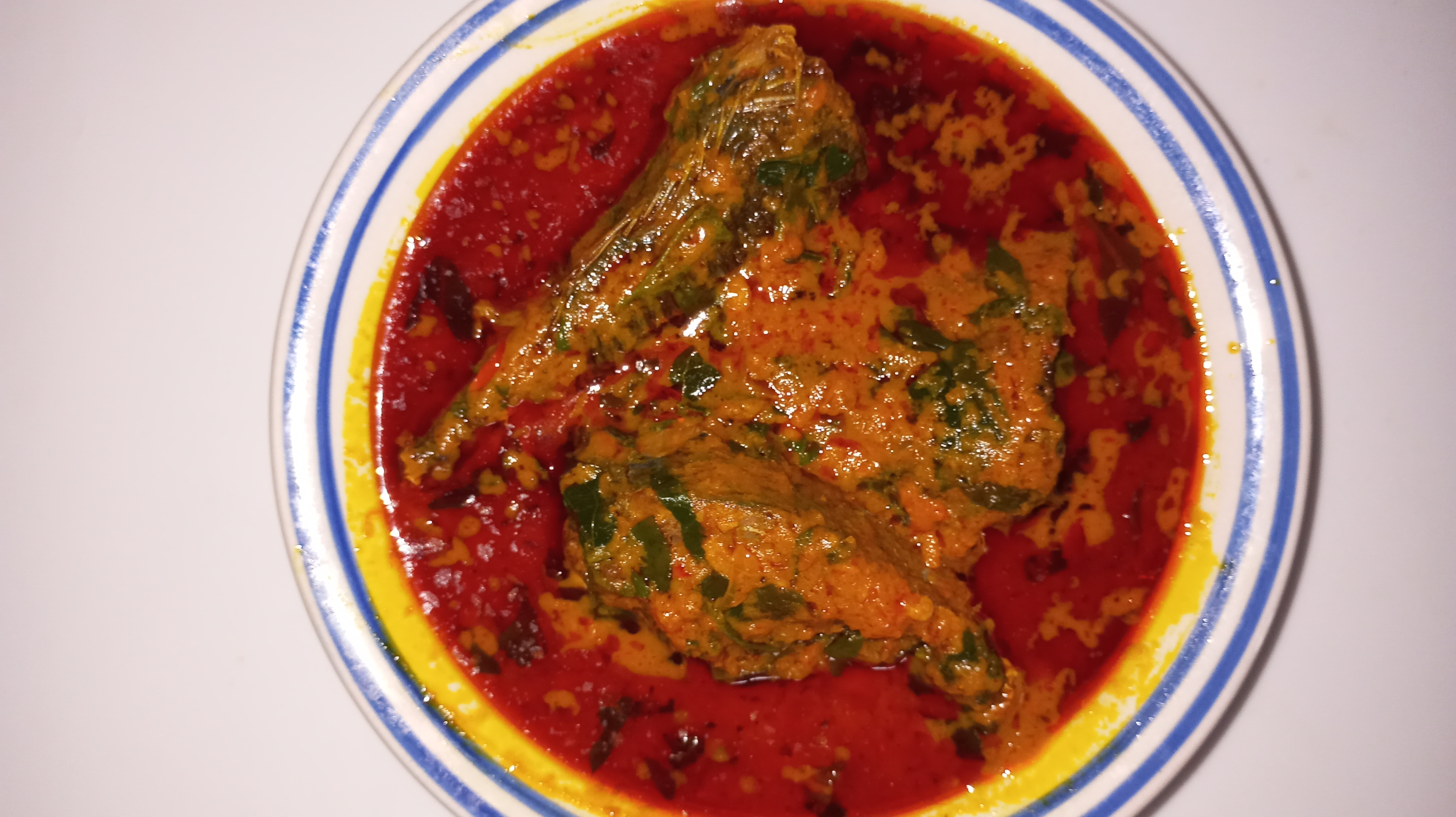
Ofe akwụ

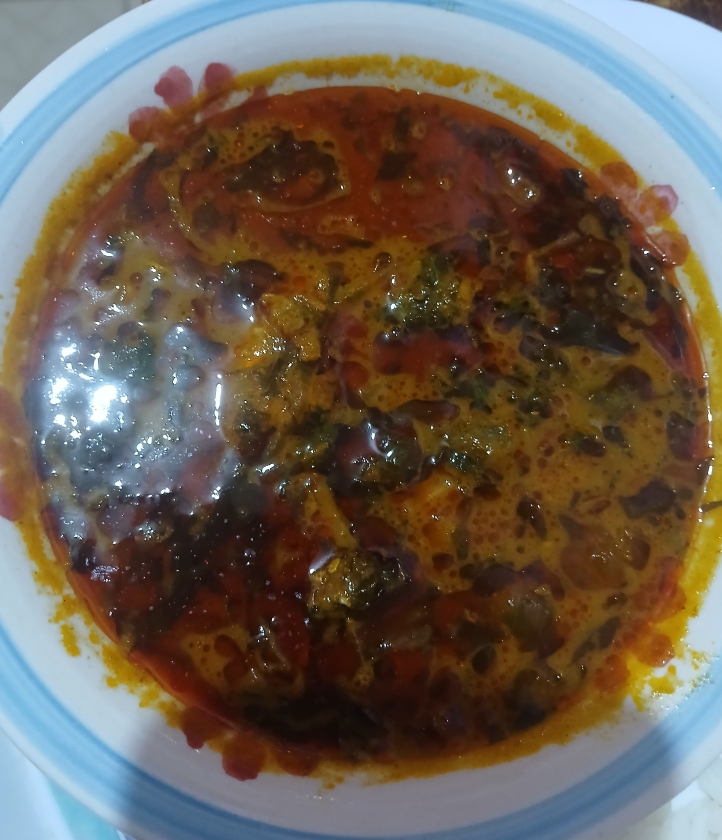
Ofe akwụ

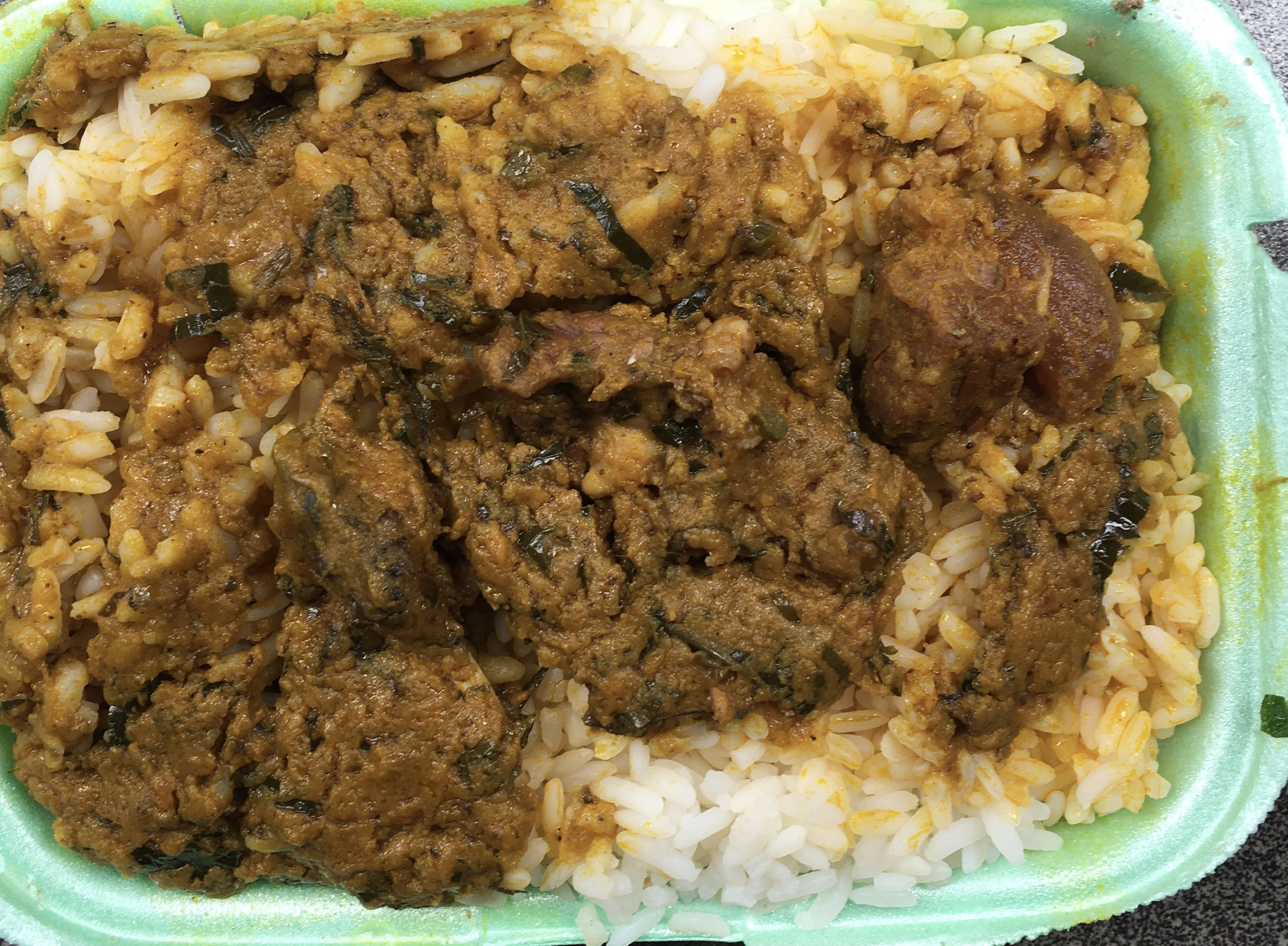
Ofe akwụ served with rice

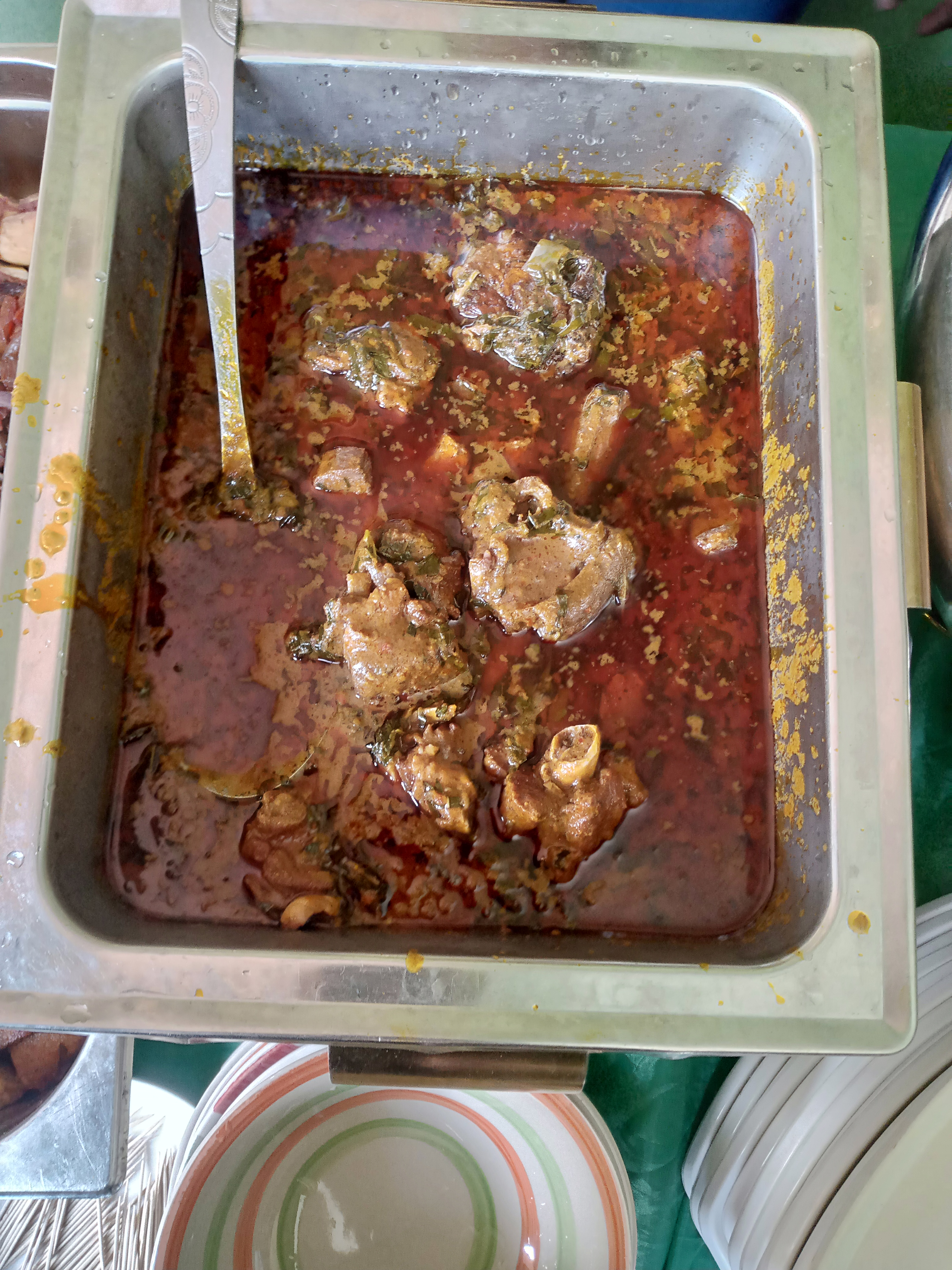
Ofe akwụ
