= Tetrapleura chevalieri =

Scientific classification
- Kingdom: Plantae
- Clade: Tracheophytes
- Clade: Angiosperms
- Clade: Eudicots
- Clade: Rosids
- Order: Fabales
- Family: Fabaceae
- Subfamily: Caesalpinioideae
- Clade: Mimosoid clade
- Genus: Tetrapleura
- Species: T. chevalieri

Binomial name
- Tetrapleura chevalieri (Harms) Baker f.

Species of legume

Tetrapleura chevalieri is a species of tree in the pea family found in western tropical Africa. It is used for its wood.
