= Ofe Nsala =

Nigerian soup

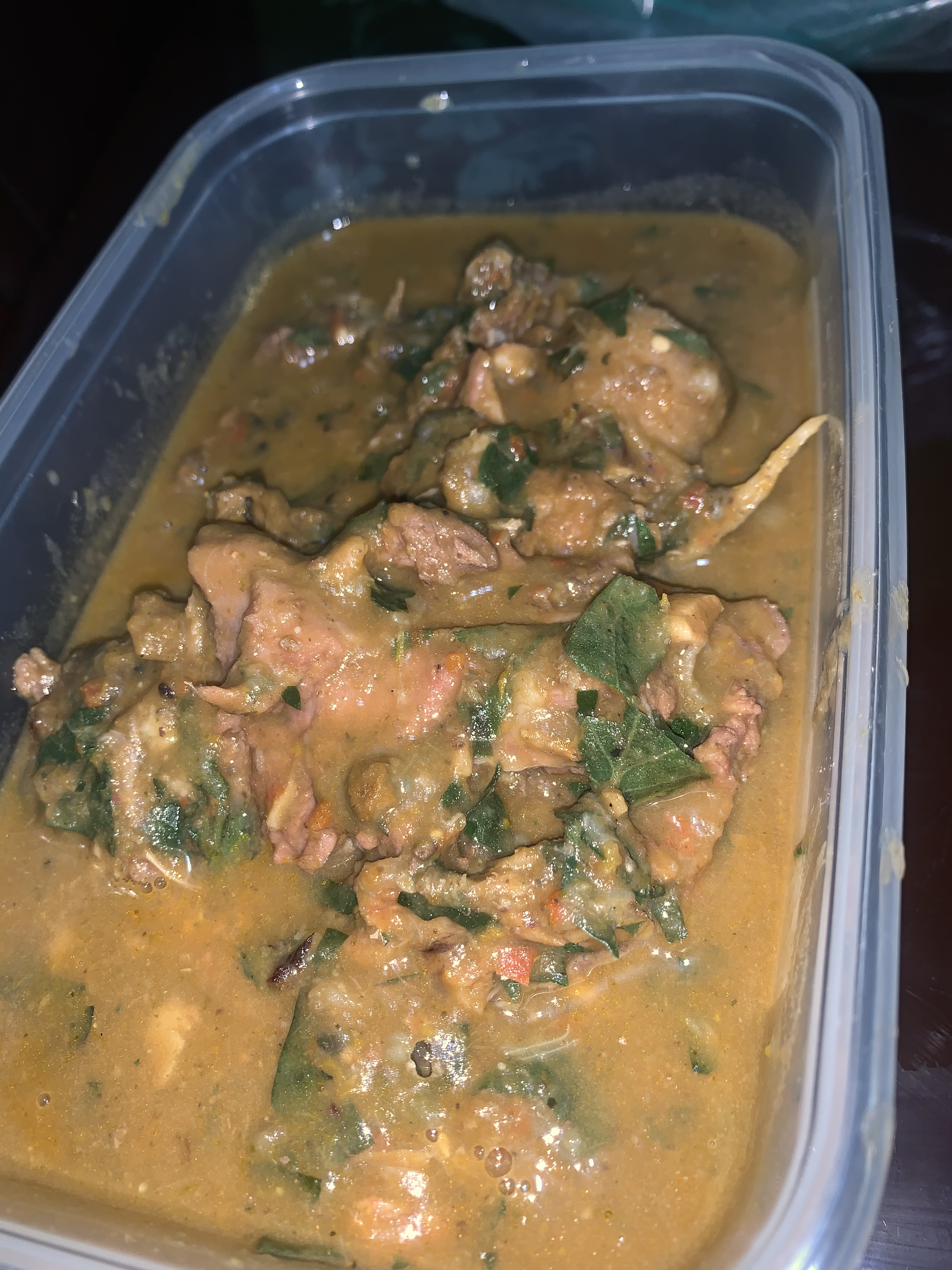
- Ofe Nsala
- Place of origin: Igboland
- Serving temperature: Warm
- Main ingredients: Yam; Uziza leaves; Uziza seeds
- Ingredients generally used: Utazi; Snails

Ofe Nsala , also known as white soup, and called nsala soup, is a delicacy that originates from the eastern part (Ala Igbo) of Nigeria. A major ingredient is catfish, which gives the soup a unique taste. It also contains small pieces of yam or cocoyam with utazi leaves. Nsala is similar to Afia Efere, which is common among the Efik ethnic group.

The name white soup is used because palm oil is not used in its preparation, unlike other traditional soups. The method of preparation without palm oil gives it a light, creamy appearance, while yam is used as a natural thickener.

== Recipe ==
The soup is flavoured with ogiri or iru, utazi, crayfish, yam, salt, seasoning, stock fish and dry fish. The soup is served with pounded yam, eba, semolina, semovita or any kind of morsel alongside water or preferred drink.

The major ingredients of this soup are yam and catfish. Catfish is an essential requirement; sometimes other meats are also included including goat, chicken, and tripe.

== Health benefits ==
Nsala is rich in nutrients, including vitamin C, protein, omega-3 fatty acids, selenium, phosphorus, carbohydrates, fiber, potassium, vitamin B12, and essential amino acids. It helps fight colds, and the uziza seeds used in its preparation contain antioxidants that help protect the body against cancer and support heart health.

This soup also serves as a cultural cleansing meal for women after childbirth. It is prepared with negro pepper, which is believed to aid internal cleansing. Negro pepper is traditionally used for its medicinal properties, particularly in treating stomach and respiratory disorders.

== See also ==
- Afia Efere
- List of soups
