= Gari and beans =

Ghanaian food

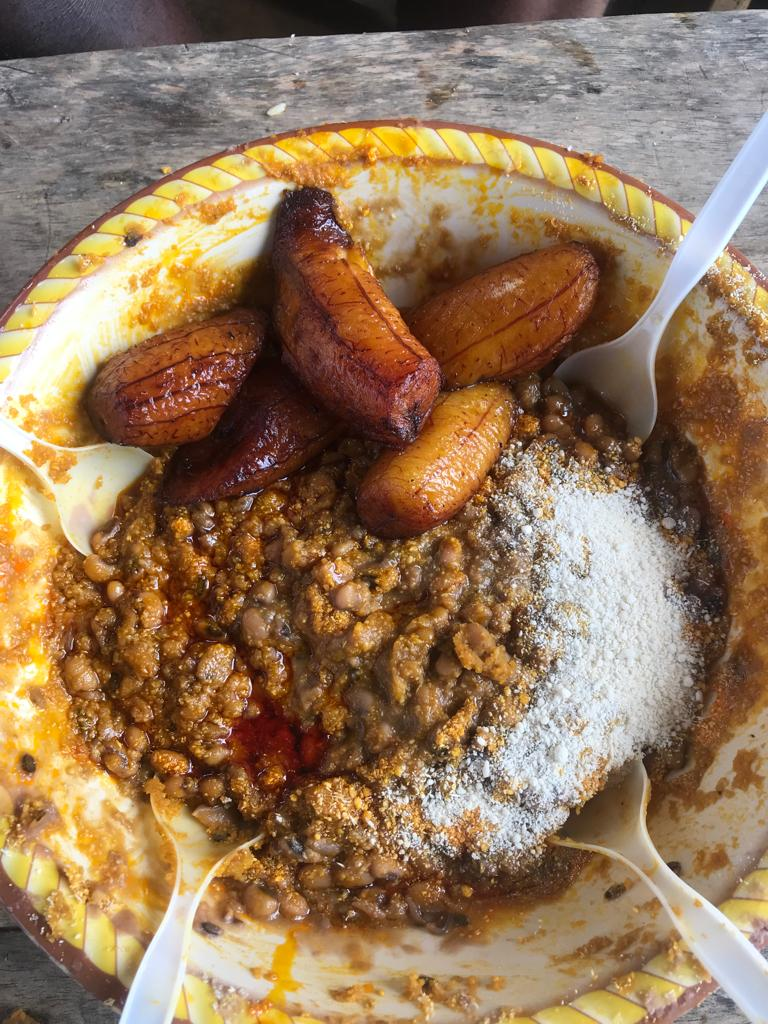
Gari and beans served with ripe plantain.

Gari and beans (also spelled gari and beans) is a West African dish consisting of garri - a granular flour made from fermented, roasted cassava - combined with cooked beans. It is a widely eaten staple food in Nigeria and Ghana, valued as an inexpensive, filling meal.

== Names ==
The dish is known by different names depending on region and language. In southern Ghana, it is popularly called gobɛ, and is also referred to as yoo ke gari (also rendered as yɔ kɛ garri), a term used for garri mixed with stew of black-eyed peas. It is closely associated with, and in some sources treated as equivalent to, red red, a Ghanaian black-eyed pea stew cooked in red palm oil that is traditionally served with fried plantain and, optionally, garri. In Nigeria, particularly among Yoruba seakers, the combination is generally referred to simply as "beans and garri" or "garri and beans".

== Description and Preparation ==
Garri is produced from cassava roots that are peeled, washed, grated and fermented after which the liqiud is pressed out and the resulting mash is sieved and roasted(or fried) into dry granules, sometimes with palm oil added to give it a yellow colour. It can be classified by texture (extra-fine, fine, or coarse grain) and by processing method or fermentation length.

To prepare garri and beans, cooked beans - typically black-eyed peas in Ghana or brown beans in Nigeria - are combined with dry or soaked garri. Preparation methods vary:

- In Nigeria, garri may be soaked in water until softened and then eaten alongside a portion of cooked beans, or the cooked beans may be poured directly over dry garri. A well-regarded variety used for this purpose is Ijebu garri, noted for its smooth texture and sour taste.
- In Ghana, the beans are typically stewed with tomatoes, onions, and red palm oil - the preparation known as red red and served with fried plantain, with garri either mixed into the stew or sprinkled on top for garnish.

Palm oil, pepper, and salt are common additions to the beans component in both traditions.

== Nutritional Value ==
Garri made from cassava is predominantly composed of carbohydrates (roughly 70-88% by weight), comparatively little protein (about 0.3-5%), fat (about 0.2-1.5%), and fibre (about 0.4-3%). Because cassava protein is both limited in quantity and low in essential amino acids, cassava based staples such as garri are considered a poor sole source of dietary protein and are recommended to be eaten with protein-rich complementary foods such as beans, meat, fish, or eggs.

Beans, as legumes, supply protein, dietary fibre, and iron. Combining garri with beans is accordingly regarded as a way of pairing starchy, energy-dense staple with a more protein and micronutrient-rich food. Cassava products, including garri, additionally undergo processing steps such as fermentation and frying that reduce the naturally occurring cyanogenic compounds (linamarin) present in raw cassava.

== Culural Context ==
Garri is one of the most widely consumed cassava products in West Africa, forming a significant part of diet in Nigeria, Ghana, Benin, Togo, Guinea, Cameroon, and Liberia. Because of its low cost and long shelf life compared with fresh cassava, garri is popular among low-income households, and dishes such as garri and beans are commonly associated everyday, affordable eating rather than festive cuisine.

== See also ==
- Garri
- Red red
- Eba
- Cassava
- Ghanaian cuisine
- Nigerian cuisine
