= Abula (soup) =

Yoruba traditional delicacy from Nigeria

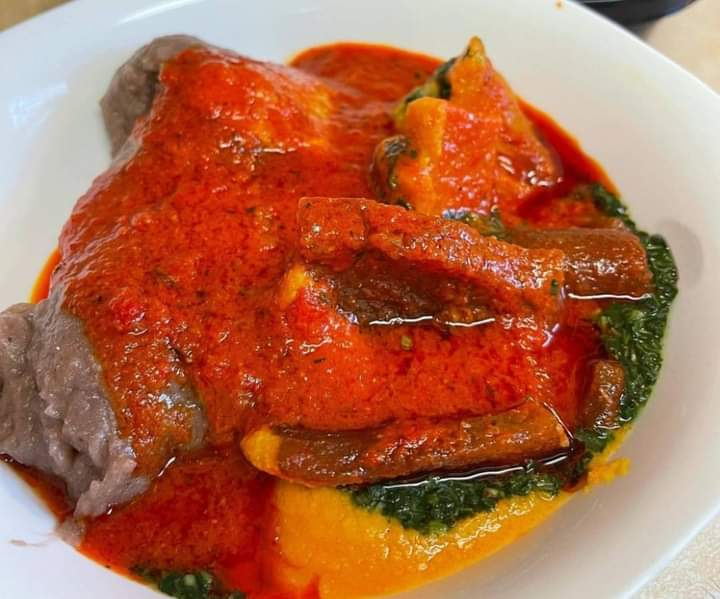
- Amala With Ponmo And Abula
- Type: Soup
- Place of origin: South West (Nigeria)
- Region or state: Yoruba people
- Serving temperature: Warm
- Main ingredients: Ewedu; Gbegiri; Obe ata
- Ingredients generally used: Crayfish; Onions

Àbùlà is a dish that originated from Yoruba people from Yorubaland. It includes amala (a yam or cassava dish), ewedu (jute mallow soup), gbegiri (black-eyed pea soup) and obe ata (a pepper and tomato stew)

Abula is considered a delicacy because it is not a common meal. It takes considerable time and effort to make. This meal is eaten commonly among the Yoruba people of Ọ̀yọ́ and Ogbómòṣọ́

== Overview ==
It is made from peeled, cooked Black-eyed peas and has a velvety texture with a mild flavor. The soup is served with amala and is commonly prepared for special occasions such as weddings, naming ceremonies, and political gatherings. In Yoruba culture, serving it with amala symbolizes warmth, hospitality, and cultural pride.

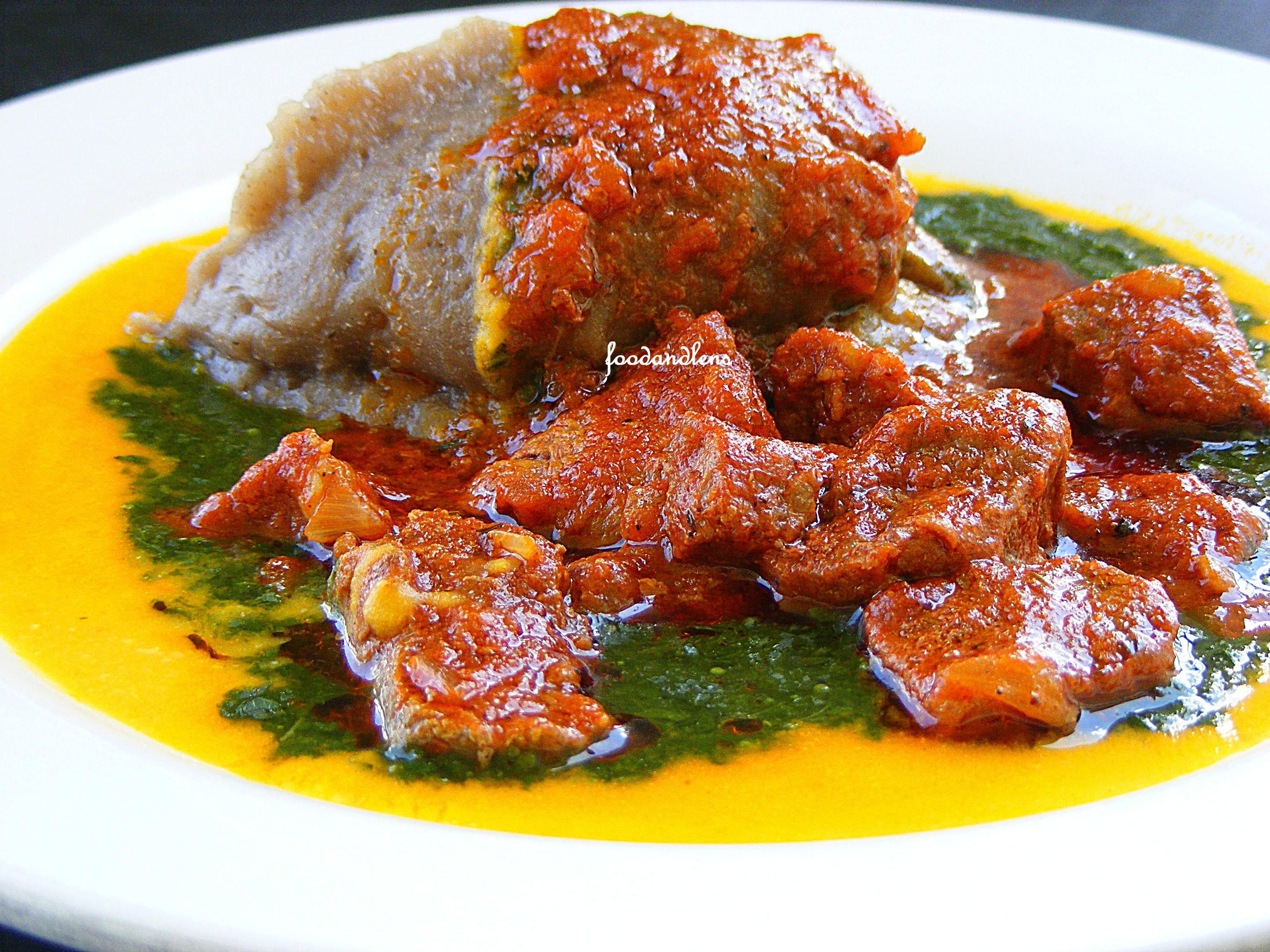
Amala with abula soup

== Ingredients ==
The following consists of a list of ingredients used in preparing abula:

Gbegiri

- Beans
- Water
- Onions (optional)
- Blended pepper (ata rodo, also known as Scotch bonnet) (optional)
- Palm oil
- Seasoning and salt
- Potash

Ewedu

- Ewedu leaves
- Locust beans
- Potash
- Salt
- Water

Obe ata which includes pepper, condiments and seasonings.

== See also ==
- List of soups
- Soup
