= Gbegiri =

Nigerian dish

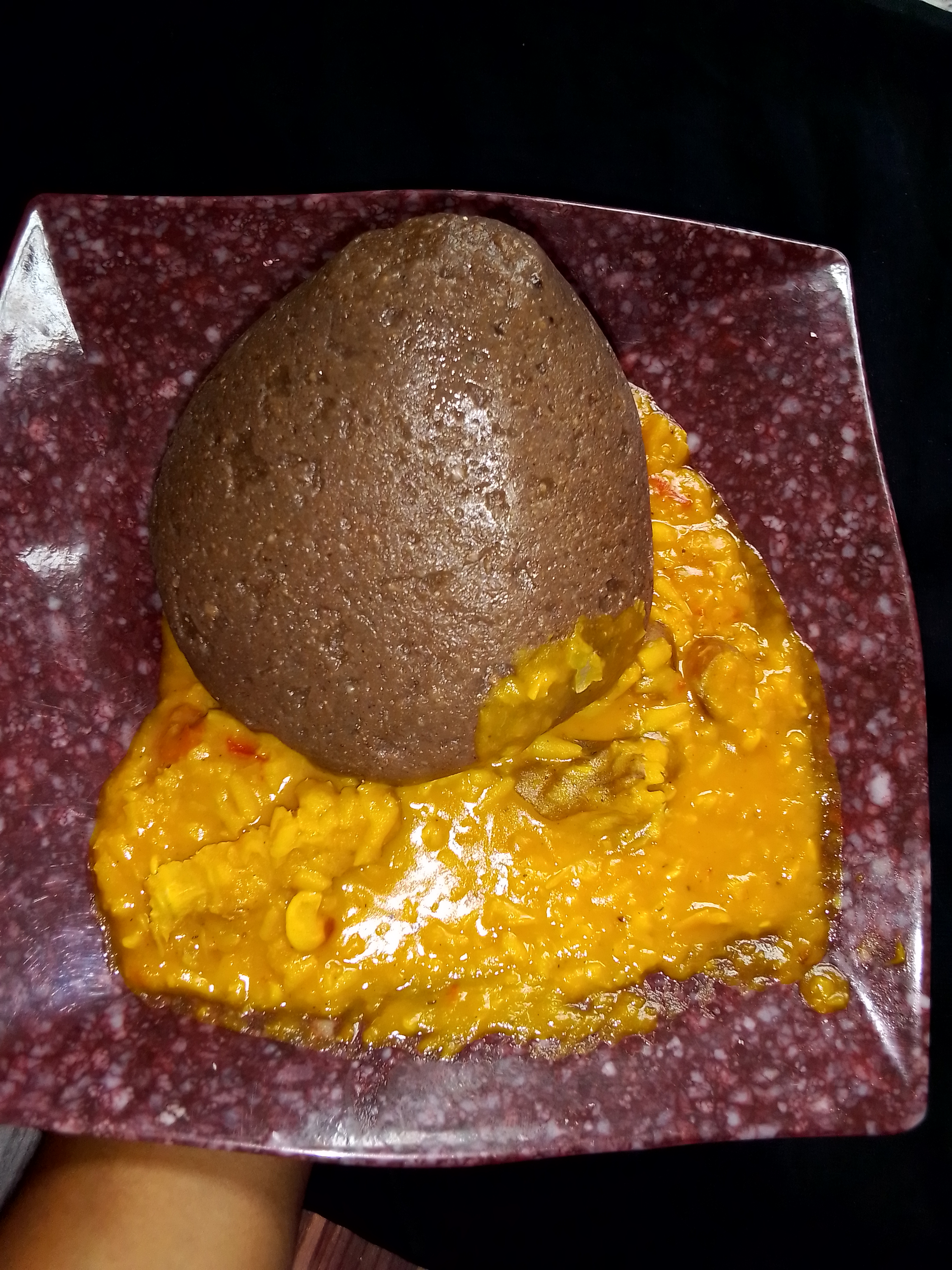
- Gbegiri and Amala
- Type: Staple food soup
- Place of origin: Nigeria
- Region or state: Yorubaland
- Main ingredients: Beans
- Similar dishes: Abula

Gbegiri is a Nigerian bean soup commonly known to the Yoruba people. It is usually eaten with Amala or Ewedu.

== Ingredients ==
- Brown beans
- Smoked fish
- Crayfish
- Palm oil
- Salt
- pepper

== Point of interest ==
In 2018, Nigerian playwright Akinwunmi Isola reportedly ate gbegiri before his death.

The food holds great respect in Yorubaland but especially in Ogbomoso, where "Gbegiri Day", is celebrated.
