= Gari Soaking =

Gari Soakings
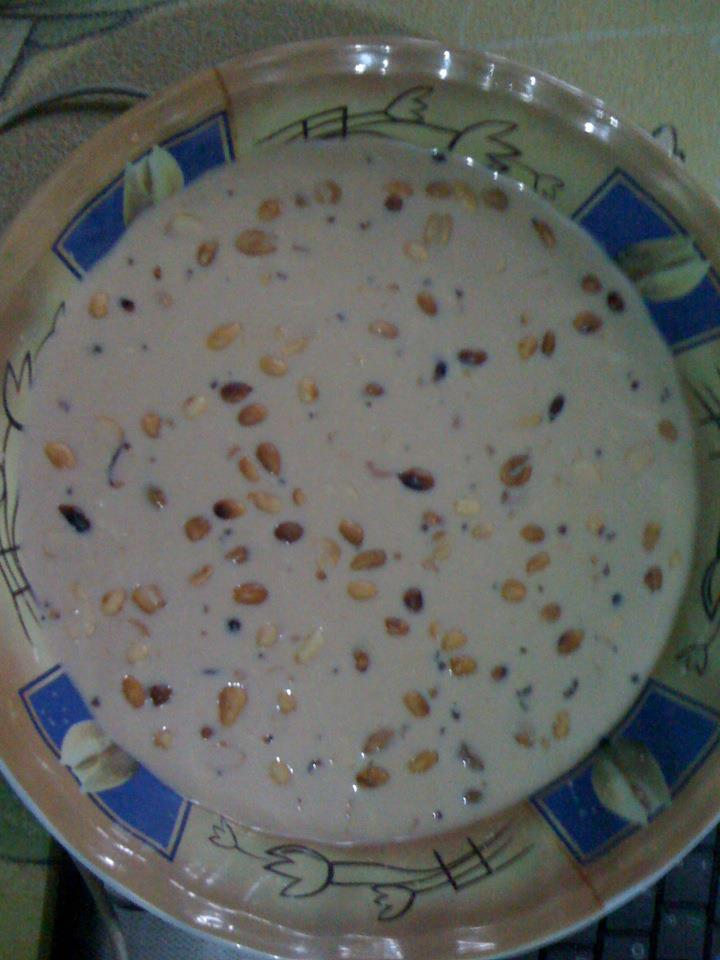
- Course: Dessert
- Place of origin: Ghana
- Serving temperature: Warm/cold
- Main ingredients: Gari, sugar, water, groundnut, milk

Gari Soaking is popular Ghanaian dessert made with gari (cassava flakes; a powdery food material flour made from the tuberous roots of a cassava plant). As the name implies, it is made by soaking the gari in water or milk.

== Ingredients ==
- Gari
- Sugar
- Water
- Groundnut/Peanut
- Milk
