= Kenkey =

Ground maize dumpling from West Africa

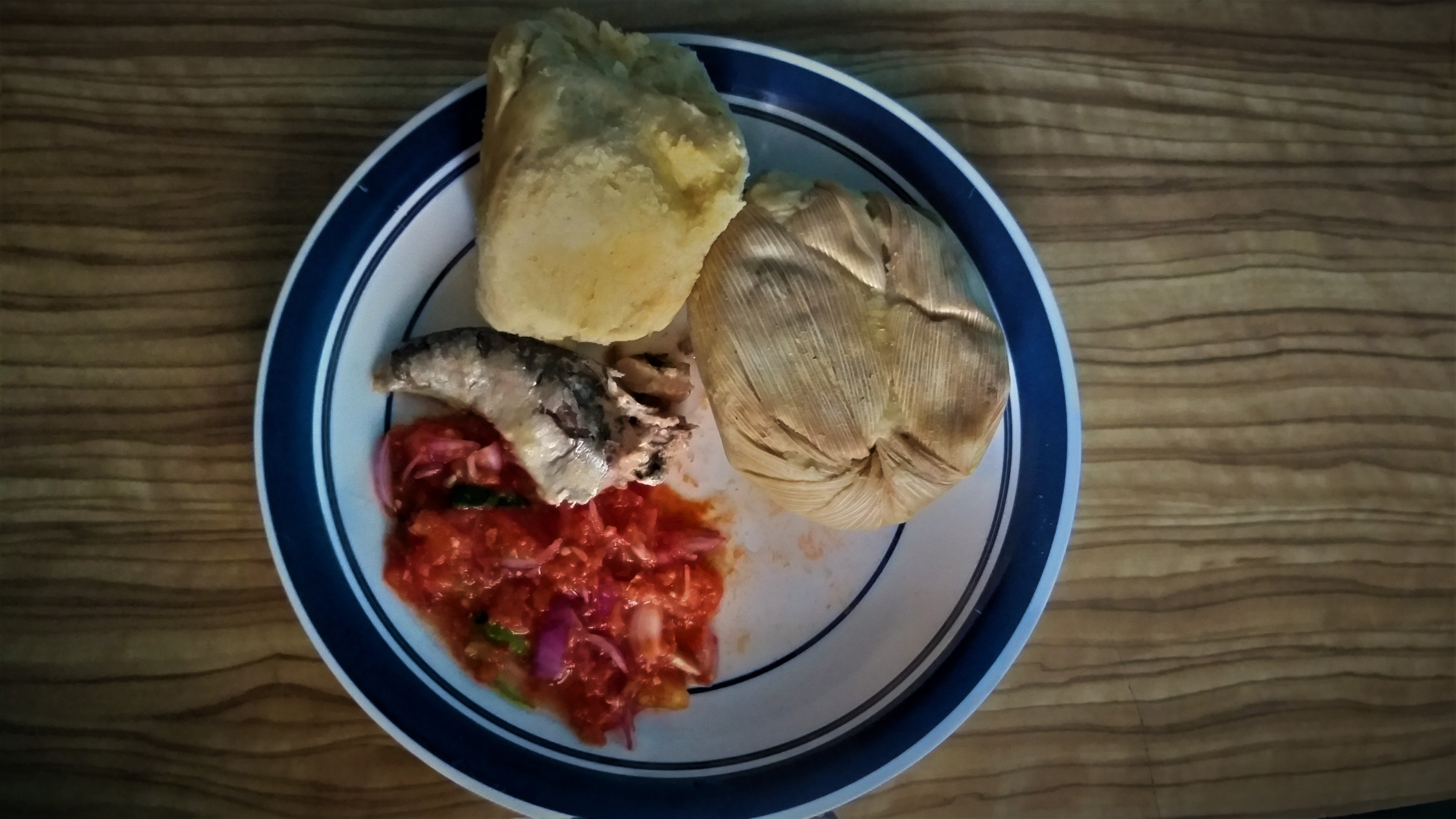
- Kenkey and ground pepper with sardine
- Alternative names: kɔmi (pronounced 'kormi') Dokunu
- Type: Swallow, dumpling
- Region or state: West Africa
- Main ingredients: Ground corn

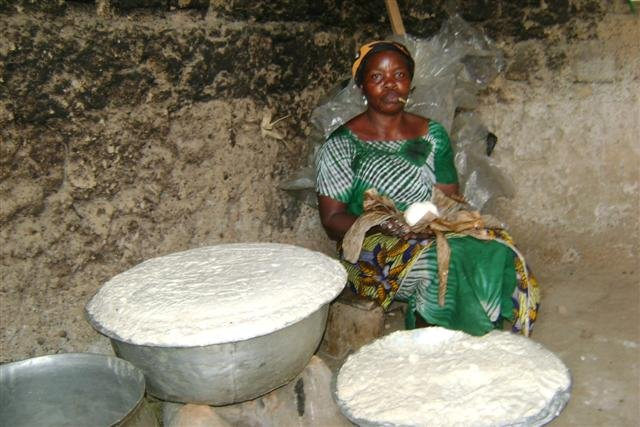
Woman preparing Fante kenkey (boiled maize dough)

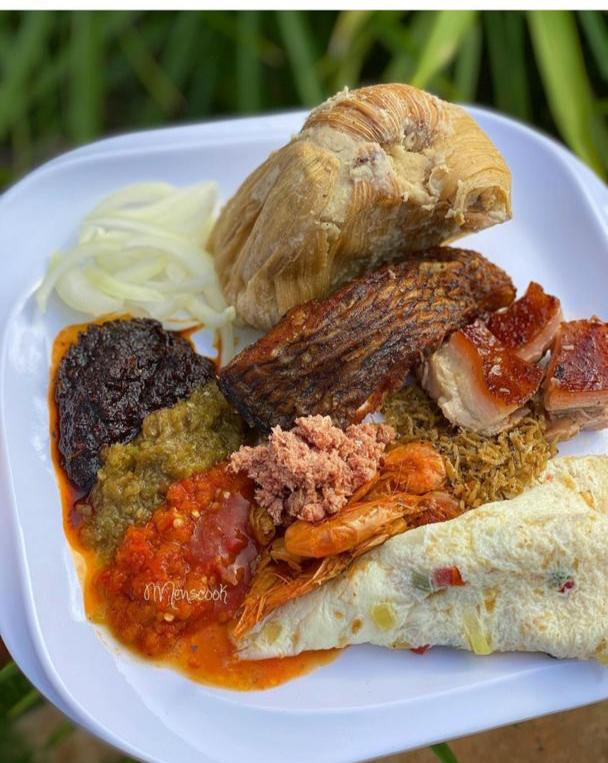
Ga kenkey

Kenkey (also known as kɔmi, otim, kooboo or dorkunu, dokunu) is a staple swallow food similar to sourdough dumplings from the Ga and Fante-inhabited regions of West Africa, usually served with pepper crudaiola and fried fish, soup or stew.

== Description ==
Kenkey is produced by steeping grains of maize in water for about one week, then milling them and kneading them with water into a dough. The dough is allowed to ferment for four days to a week before part of the dough is cooked.

== Variations and similar dishes ==
Areas where kenkey is eaten include Ghana, eastern Côte d'Ivoire, Togo and western Benin. It is usually made from ground corn (maize), like sadza and ugali. It is popularly known as kɔmi (pronounced kormi) by the Gas or dokono by the Akans in Ghana.

In the Caribbean, there are variations of an indigenous dessert of Mesoamerican origin, i.e. sweet tamale, which was adopted by Africans brought to the region during slavery and indentureship. As such, African influence can be found in the names of the variations like: ducana (in Antigua and Barbuda), duckunoo, duckanoo (also blue drawers or tie-a-leaf in Jamaica), doukounou (in Haiti), ducunu/ dukunu (also tamalito in Belize), and dokonon (in French Guiana). In Guyana, it is called conkie (pronounced /kankee/). In Trinidad and Tobago it is called paime (pronounced /pay-me/), and differs in that it does not contain plantain, but may include coconut, pumpkin and/or raisins. The dish is usually associated with Christmas time. In Latin America, it is made with cornmeal, masa or yuca, while in the Caribbean, it is typically made with cornmeal, plantain or sweet potato. Maize and sweet potato were staples of the indigenous Amerindians of the Americas, hence Jamaicans and other Antilleans typically add sweet potato and grated green bananas to cornmeal or flour with coconut, sugar, spices and vanilla. The mixture is wrapped in banana leaves, then steamed.

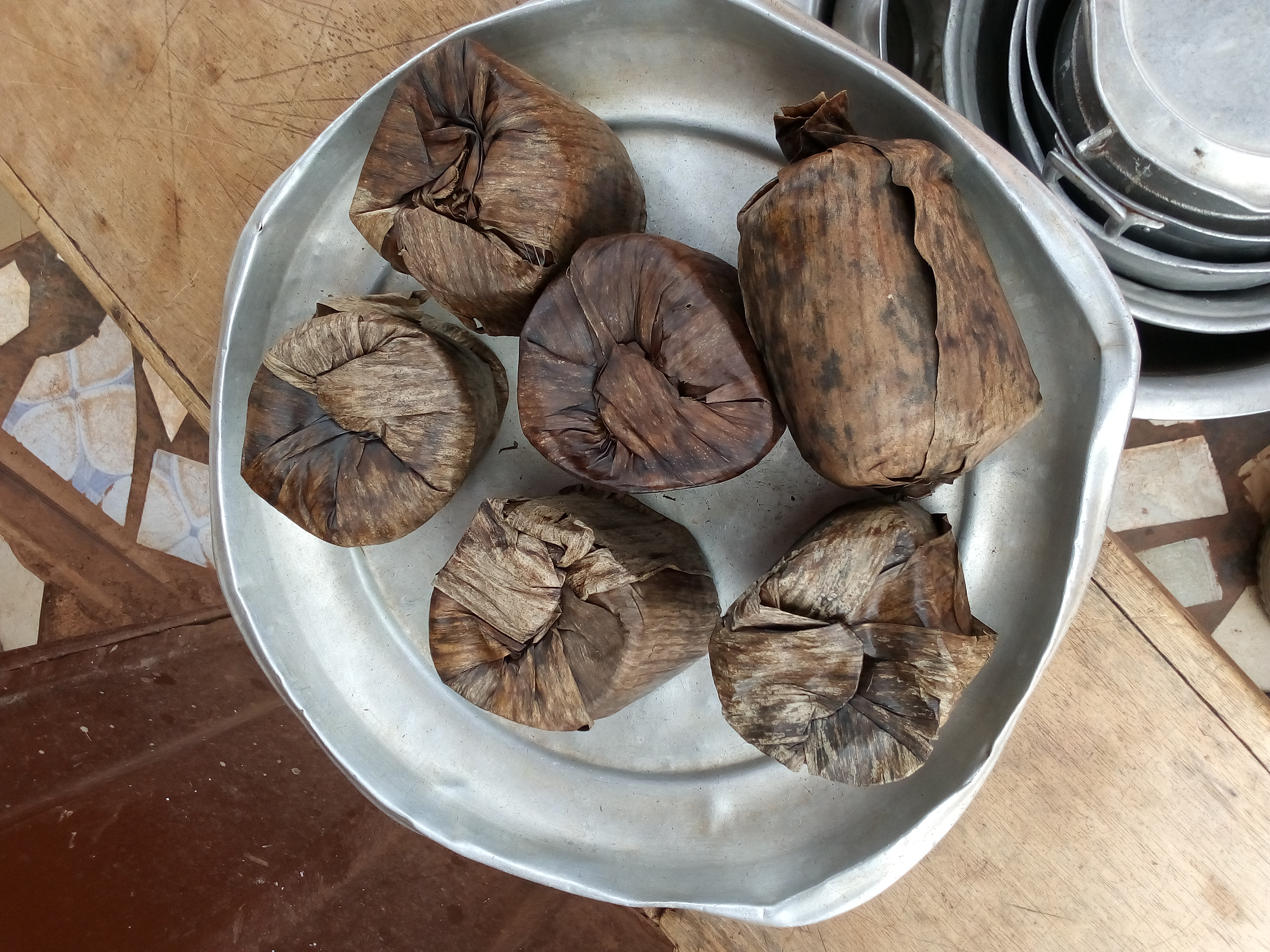
Fante kenkey

Unlike ugali, making kenkey involves letting the maize ferment before cooking. Therefore, preparation takes a few days in order to let the dough ferment. Corn meal is mixed with cornstarch and water is added until a smooth and consistent dough is obtained. It is covered and left in a warm place for the fermentation to take place. After fermentation, the kenkey is partially cooked, wrapped in banana leaves, corn husks, or foil, and steamed. There are several versions of kenkey, such as Ga and Fante kenkey. The Ga kenkey is more common in most parts of Ghana.

Ice kenkey is a meal made from kenkey mixed with water, sugar, powdered milk, and ice.

== Gallery ==
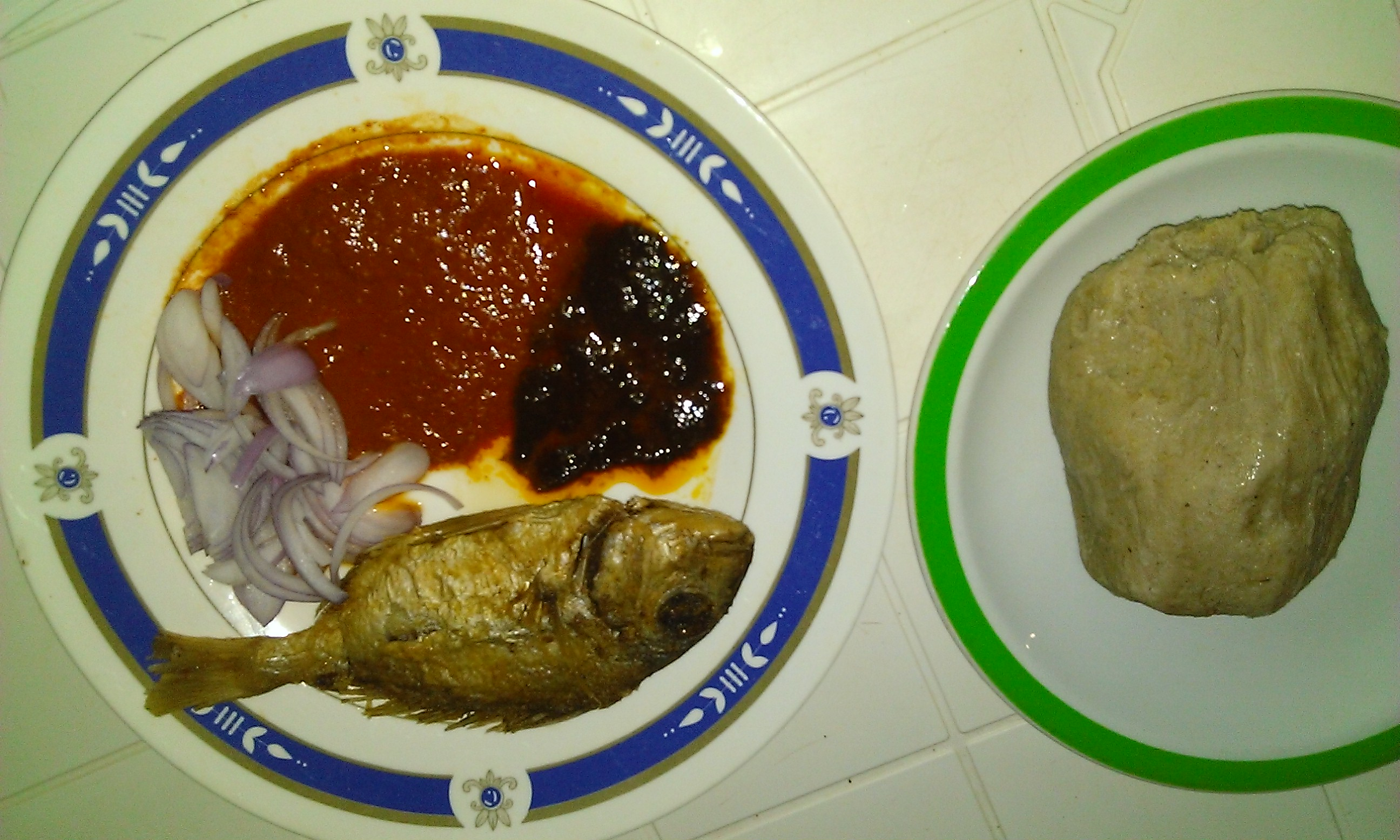
Ghanaian kenkey

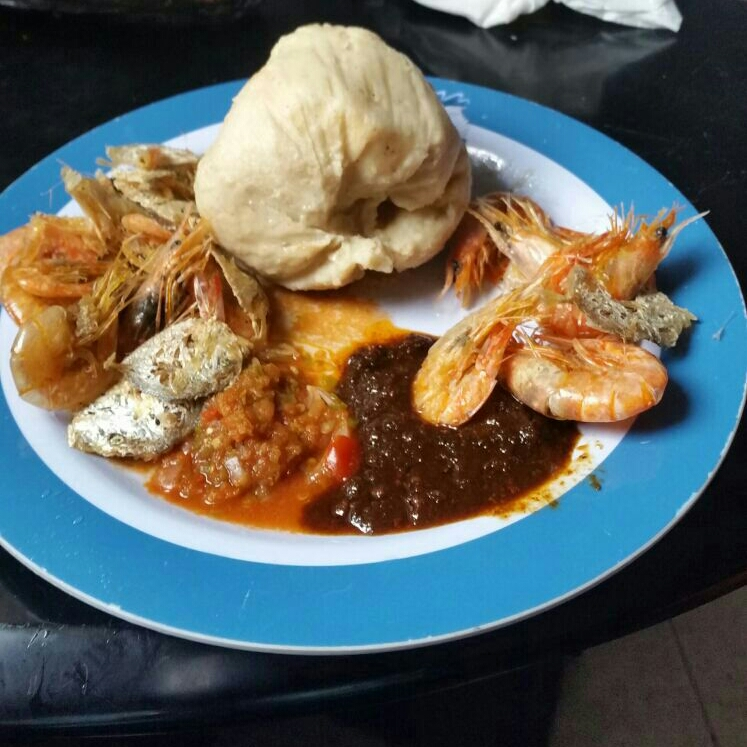
Ga kenkey with shrimp

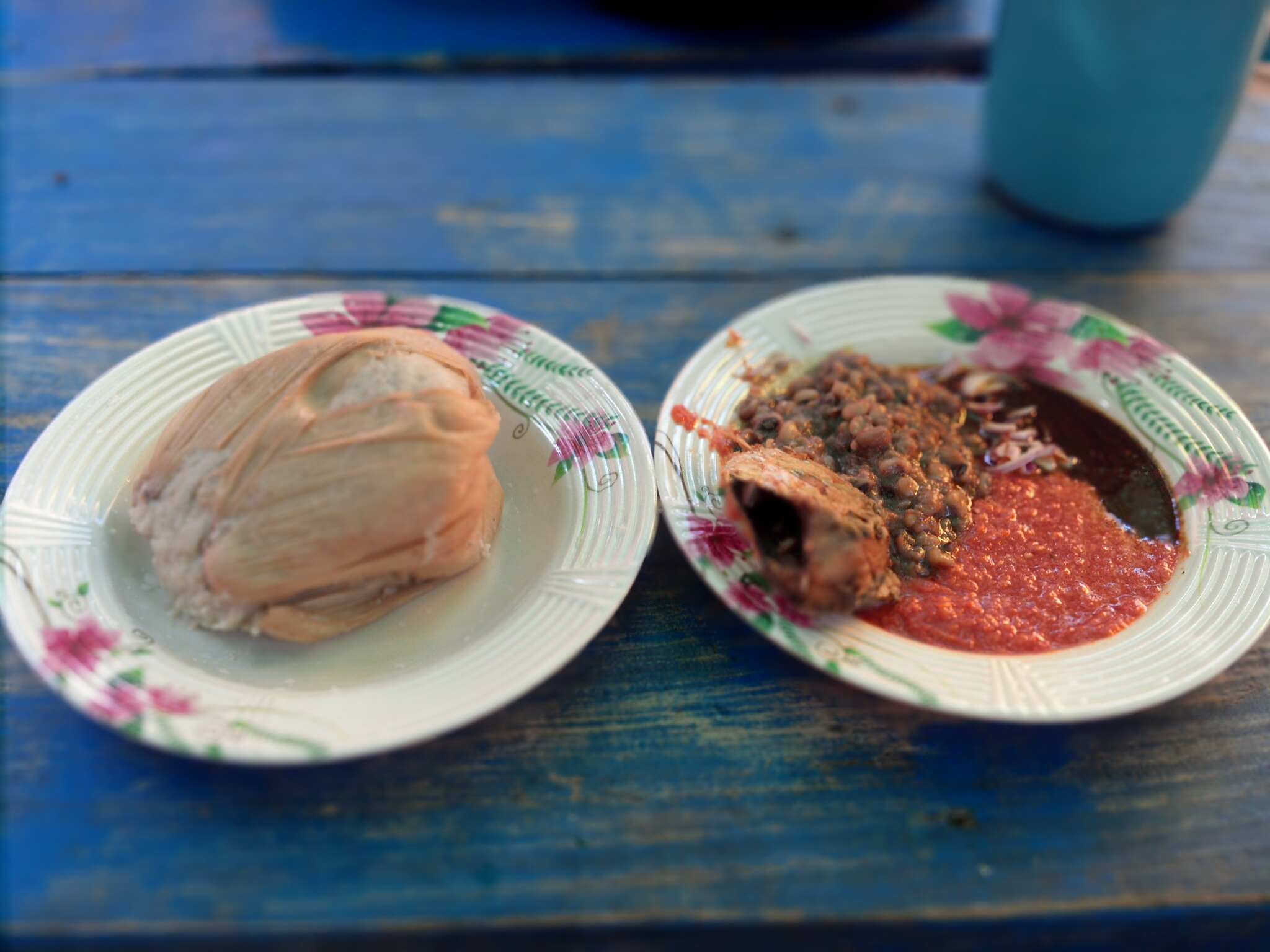
Ga kenkey with pepper and beans

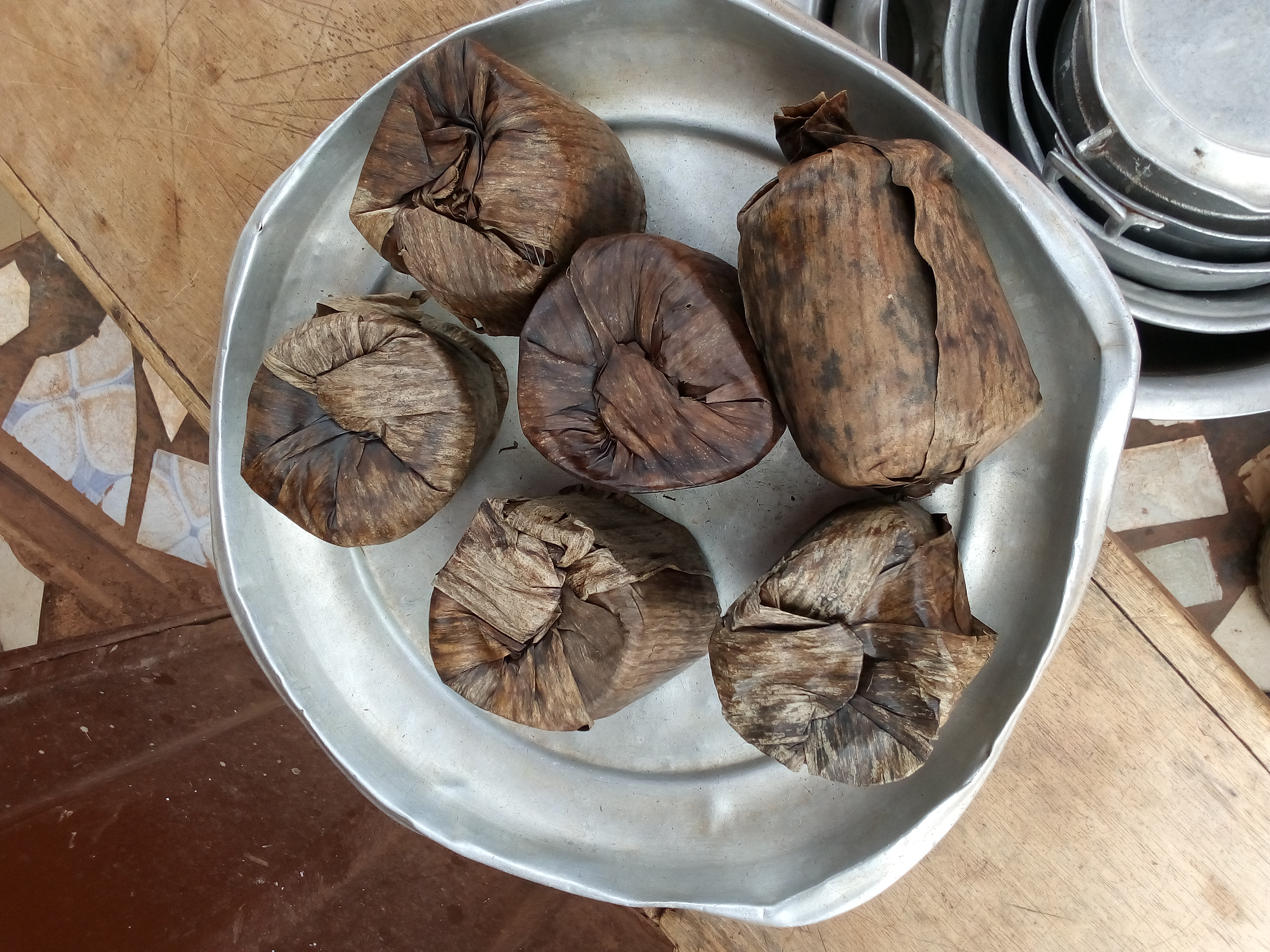
Fante kenkey

== See also ==
- Cuisine of Ghana
- List of African dishes
- List of dumplings
- Pasteles
- Hallaca
- Bollo
