= Swallow (food) =

Dough-like African staple food

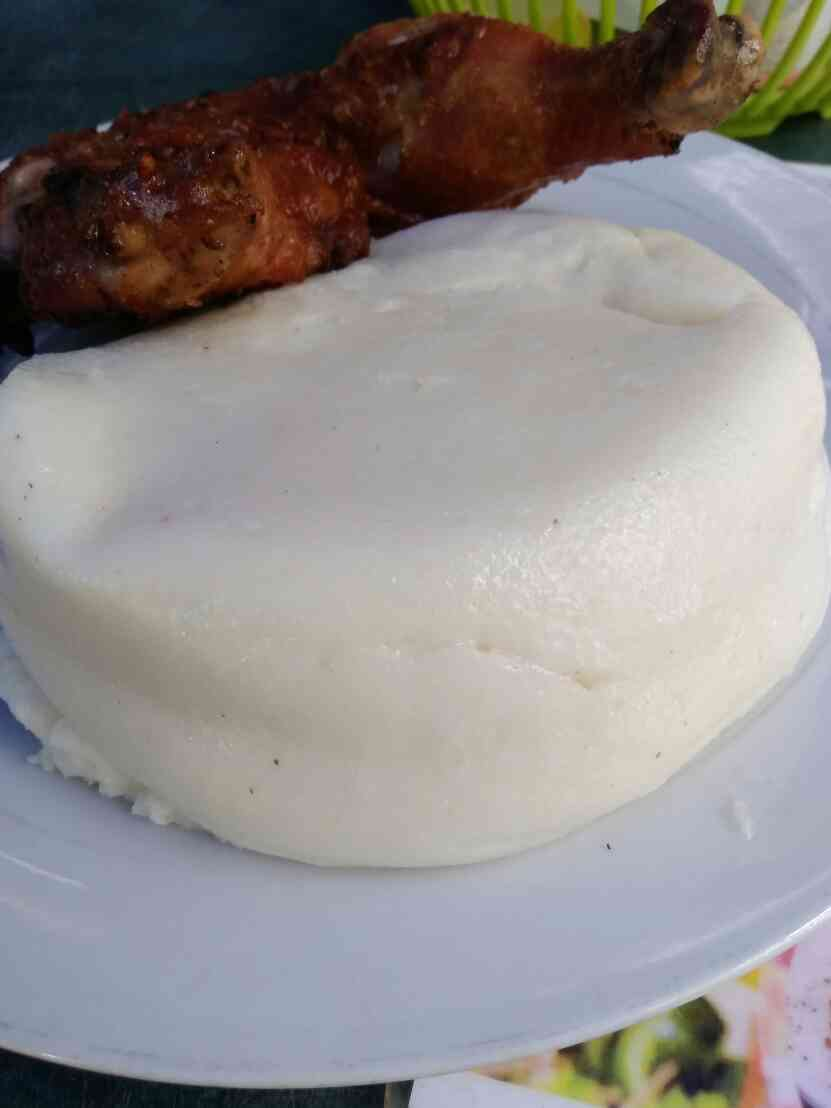
Nsima of Malawi

Swallows are a category of dough-like African and Indian staple foods made of cooked starchy vegetables and/or grains. This food category is known as okele in the Yoruba language, or Ụtara in Igbo language. Fufu of West Africa, ugali and nsima of Eastern Africa, sadza of Southern Africa, and asida of Northern Africa and the Middle East are examples of swallows. The term "swallow" (or "swallows") is a Nigerian English usage that refers to the way these foods are traditionally eaten: pinched off, molded into a small ball or scoop, dipped in soup or stew, and swallowed without chewing. However, this blanket term is not traditionally used by most native consumers, who almost always refer to each preparation by its specific local name (e.g., fufu, iyan, eba, ụtara, tuwo, ugali, nsima, sadza, pap, banku, etc.) even when speaking English.

== Types ==
Swallows can be categorized by their primary starch. Each type has many names in various languages around Africa, and the specific starch used may have regional substitutions.

=== Cassava ===
- Eba
- Funge
- Fufu
- Garri
- Konkonte – a poverty food of Ghana made from dried and pounded manioc root. It is also eaten in the Caribbean. The name derives from the Kwa languages.

=== Maize ===
- Soor
- Cou-cou
- Kenkey
- Nsima
- Sadza
- Tuwon masara
- Uji, a thick East African porridge made most commonly from corn flour mixed with sorghum and many other different ground cereals, with milk or butter and sugar or salt. Ugali, a more solid meal, is also made from maize flour, likewise often mixed with other cereals. These two, under various names, are staple foods over a wide part of the African continent, e.g., pap in South Africa, sadza or isitshwala in Zimbabwe, nshima in Zambia, tuwo or ogi in Nigeria, etc., though some of these may also be made from sorghum.
- Mielie pap is a maize porridge staple in South African cuisine.
- Obusuma – the Luhya word for Ugali, a Kenyan dish also known as sima, sembe, ngima or posho. It is made from maize flour (cornmeal) cooked with boiling water to a thick porridge dough-like consistency. In Luhya cuisine it is the most common staple starch.
- Pap – also known as mieliepap in South Africa, is a traditional porridge/polenta made from mielie-meal (ground maize) and a staple food of the Bantu inhabitants of South Africa (the Afrikaans word pap is taken from Dutch and simply means "porridge").
- Sadza – a cooked cornmeal that is a staple food in Zimbabwe and other parts of Southern Africa and Eastern Africa. This food is cooked widely in other countries in these region.
- Ugali – maize flour (cornmeal) cooked with water to a porridge- or dough-like consistency. The dish is common in the local cuisines of the eastern African Great Lakes region and Southern Africa.

=== Millet ===
- Ragi mudde
- Oshifima or otjifima, a stiff pearl millet porridge, is the staple food of northern Namibia.

=== Potato ===
- Potato fufu

=== Rice ===
- Tuwon shinkafa

=== Sorghum ===
- Mabela, a sorghum porridge eaten typically for breakfast in South Africa and Zimbabwe. Maltabella is a brand name for a sorghum porridge manufactured by Bokomo Foods
- Tuwo or ogi, a Nigerian sorghum porridge that may also be made from maize.

=== Yam ===
- Pounded yam
- Poundo / Poundo yam (made with yam flour)

=== Mixed, other ===
- Amala
- Banku
- Semo (Wheat swallow)
- Asida

== Gallery ==
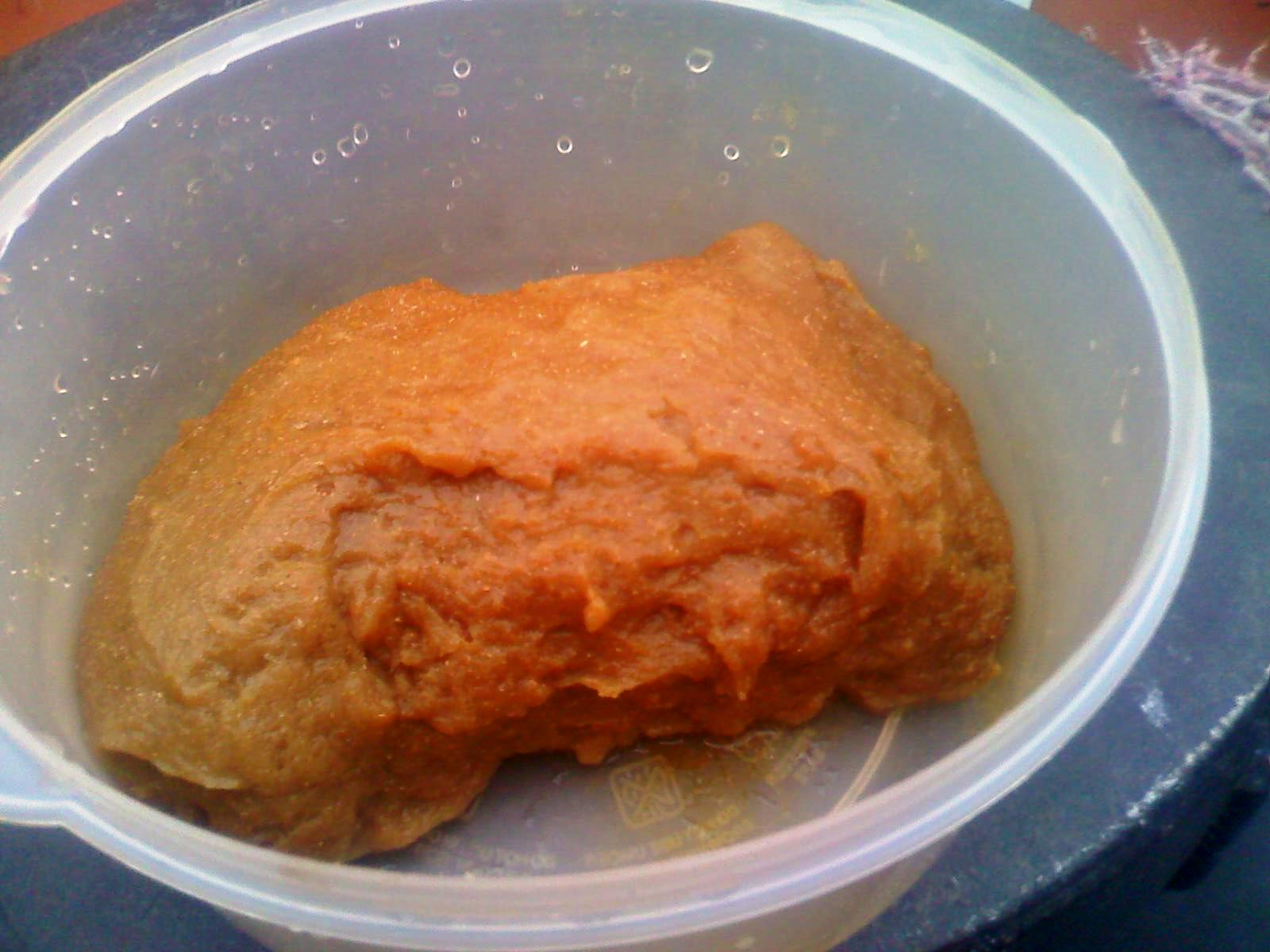
Konkonte

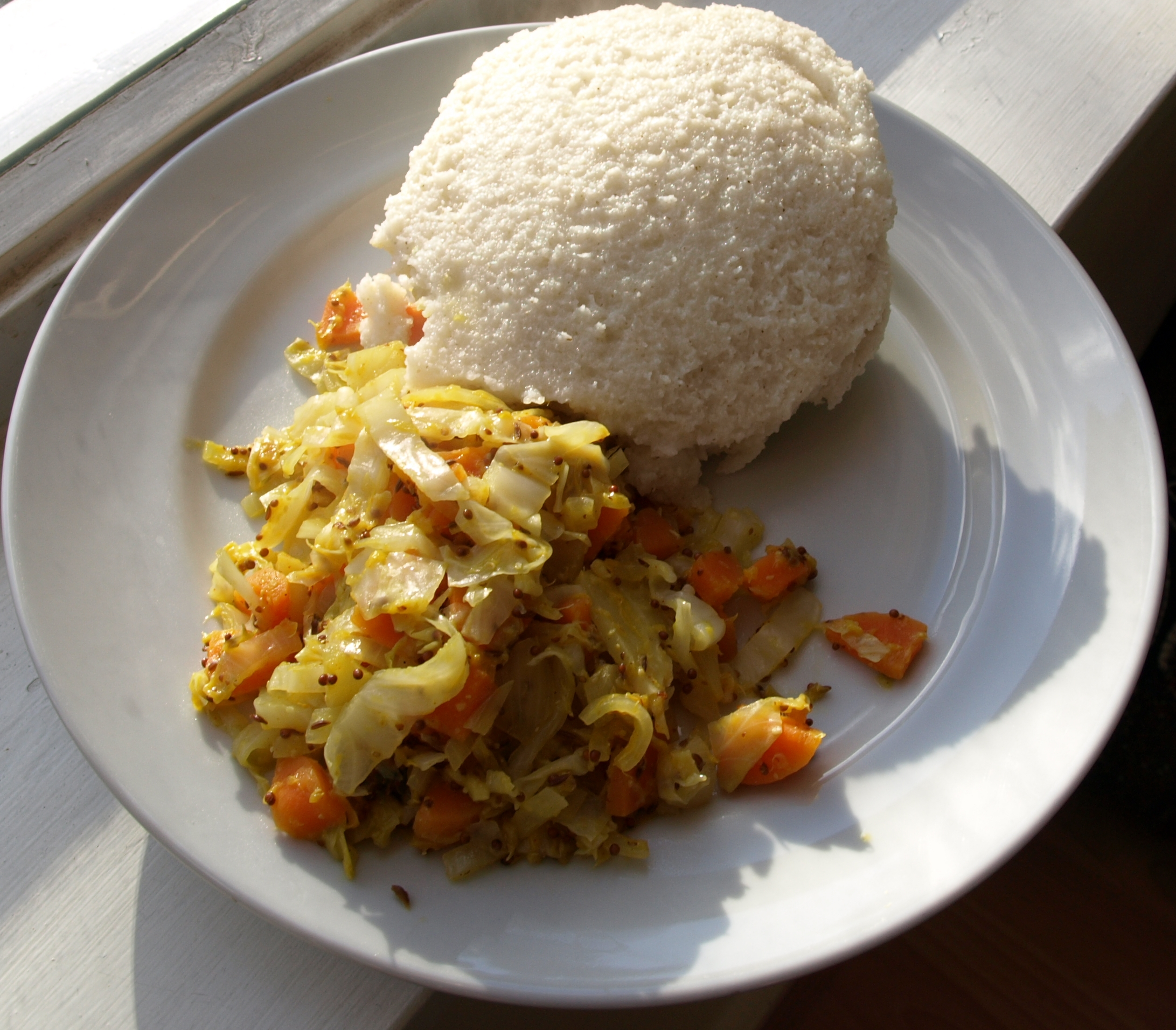
Ugali (pictured top) and cabbage

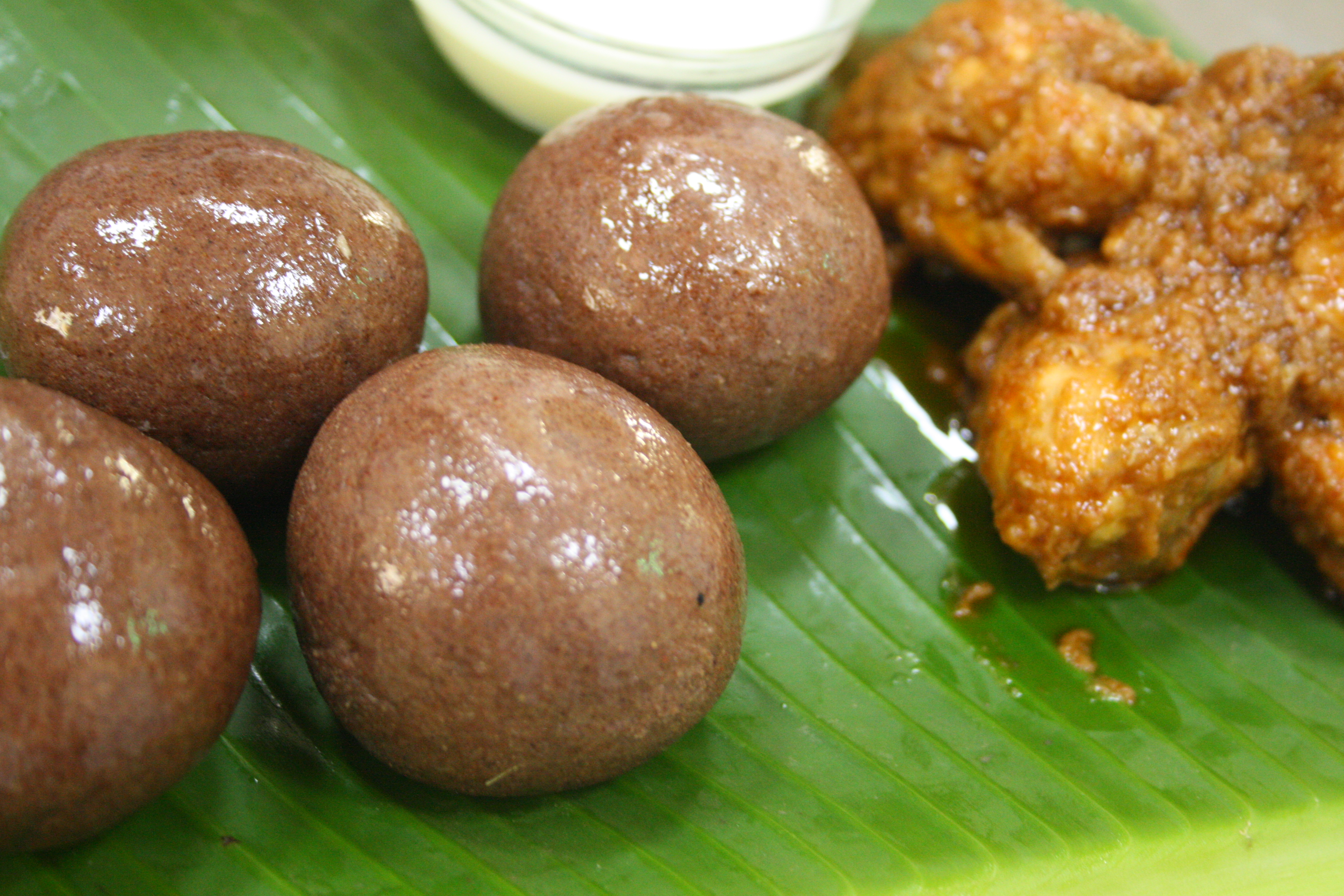
Ragi mudde in Karnataka, India

== See also ==
- Asida
- Ogi
- Porridge
- Rice cake
- Genfo
