= Eba =

West African staple food

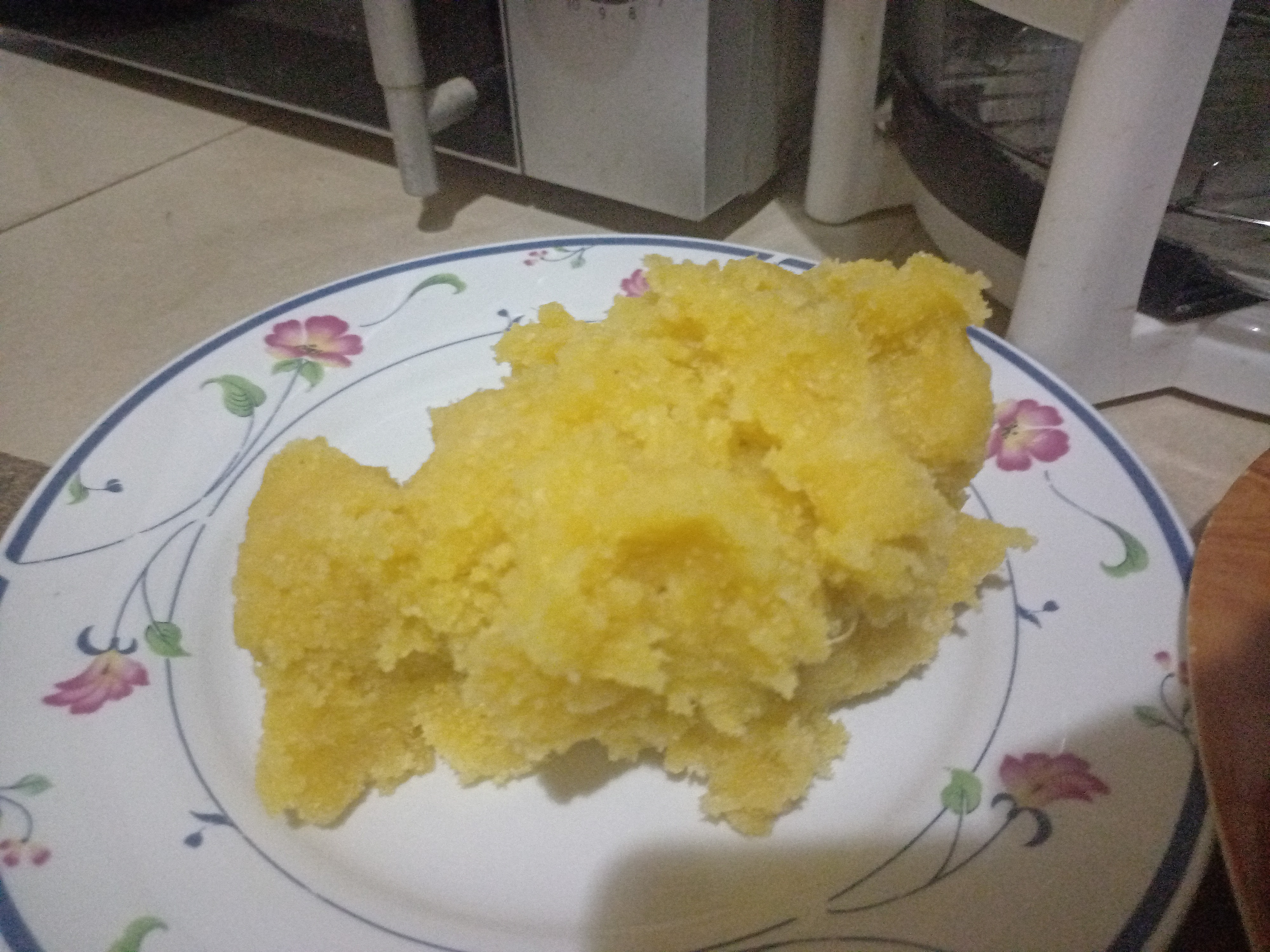
- Eba
- Type: Swallow
- Place of origin: West Africa
- Region or state: Nigeria, Ghana, Togo.
- Serving temperature: Warm
- Main ingredients: Hot Water; Yellow or white garri

Eba (Yoruba: Ẹ̀bà), also known as Ebe or Pinon' (in Togo, Benin, and southern Ghana) is a staple Okele or swallow from Nigeria, Togo and Benin in the West African sub-region and other African countries. The term Ẹ̀bà originates from Yoruba. It is a cooked starchy vegetable food made from dried grated cassava (manioc) flour commonly known as Garri all across West Africa. It is often eaten with rich soups and stews, with beef, stockfish or mutton. The dish is often described as having a slightly sour, sharp taste.

Èbà is eaten with the fingers, rolled into a small ball, and dipped into thick soups such as okra soup, chilli paste in Togo, bitter leaf soup or with either okro, ọgbọnọ (Igbo)/ apọn (Yorùbá), or ewédú, meat or fish, stewed vegetables or other sauces such as gbẹ̀gìrì, ofe akwu (banga soup) or egusi soup.

In West Africa, there two types of garri, the white and yellow; the yellow garri is prepared by frying with the addition of palm oil to give it a yellow colour and extra flavour while the white garri is fried without palm oil and is slightly more acidic with a sharper taste.

== Preparation ==
Blended garri flour is mixed into hot water and stirred thoroughly and vigorously with a wooden spatula until it becomes a firm dough that can be rolled into a ball. It can be made with different types of garri.

Depending on the type of garri flour used, Ẹ̀bà can vary in colour, from deep yellow to off white. Palm oil is often added to the garri during preparation, resulting in a bright yellow colour.

== Nutrition ==
Eba is rich in starch and carbohydrates. Eba has a gross energy content of 381.5 kcal which is higher than other cassava products like fufu and lafun with 180 kcal and 357.7 respectively. However, it has a crude protein content of 0.9g/100g, slightly lower than fufu and lafun with 1.0g/100g and 1.1g/100g respectively.

== Gallery ==
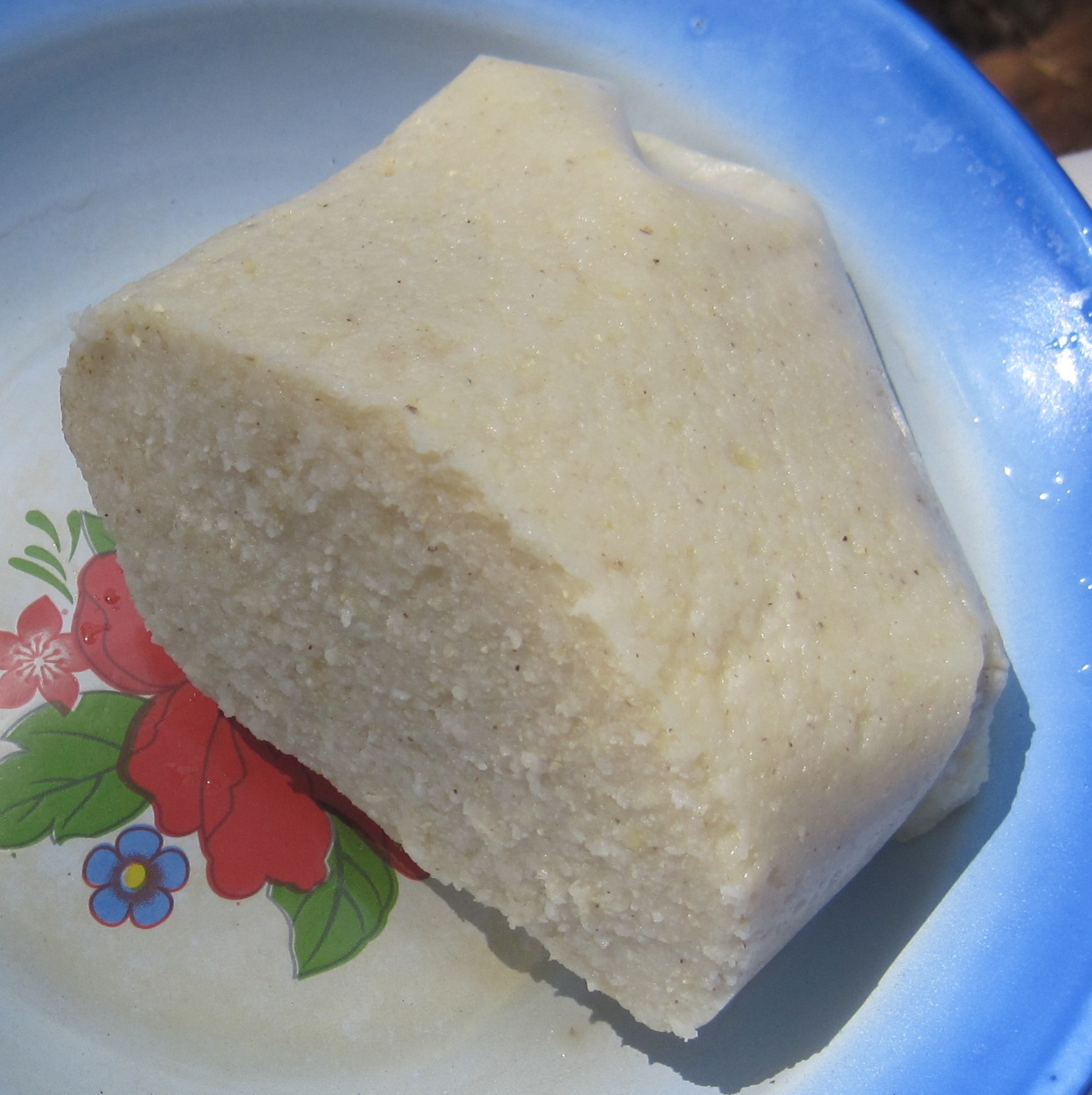
Garri to eat by hand with fish and greens. Ndop, Northwest Cameroon, 2011

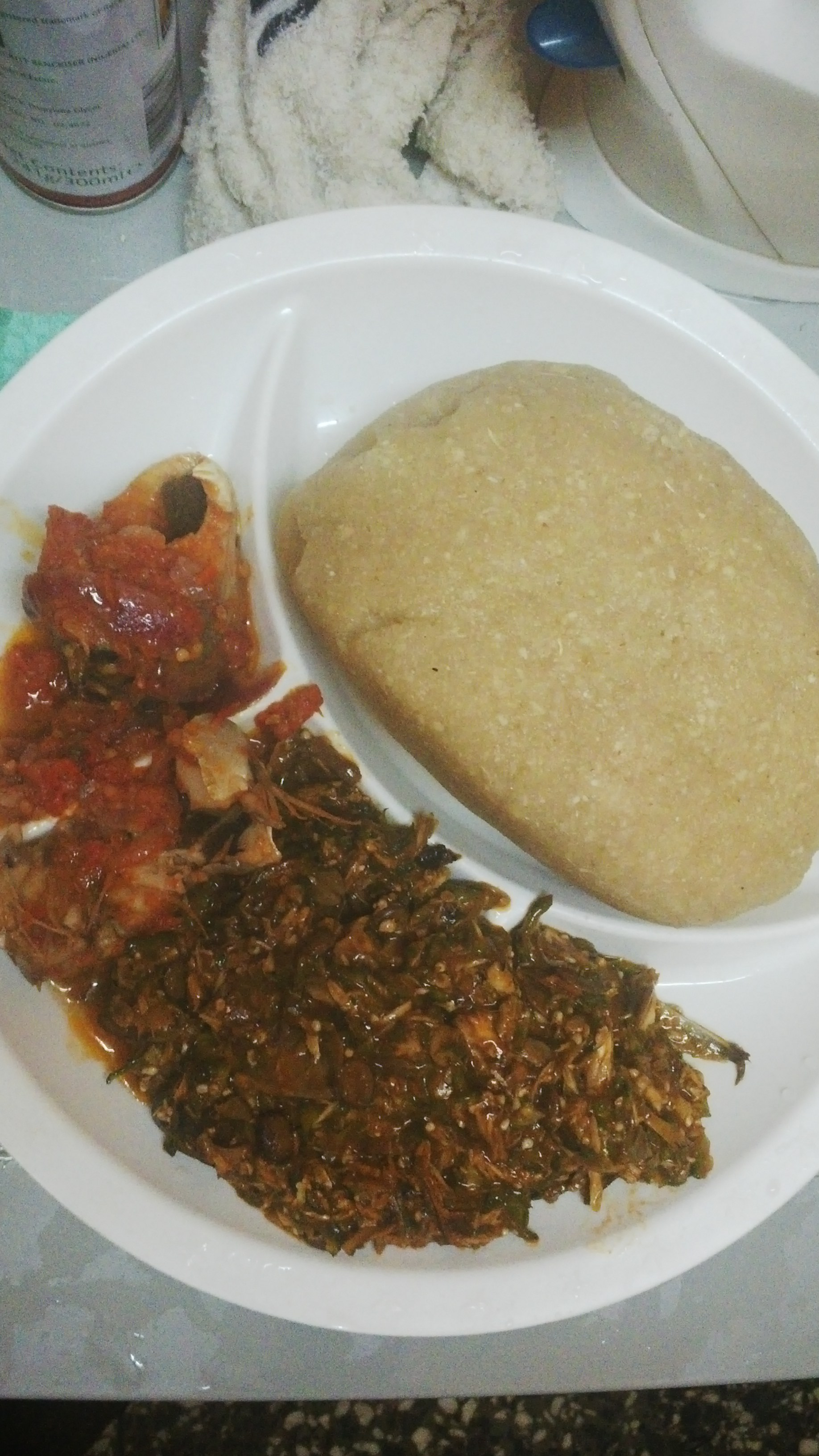
Eba and Efo riro (vegetable soup) with fish. Nigeria, 2014

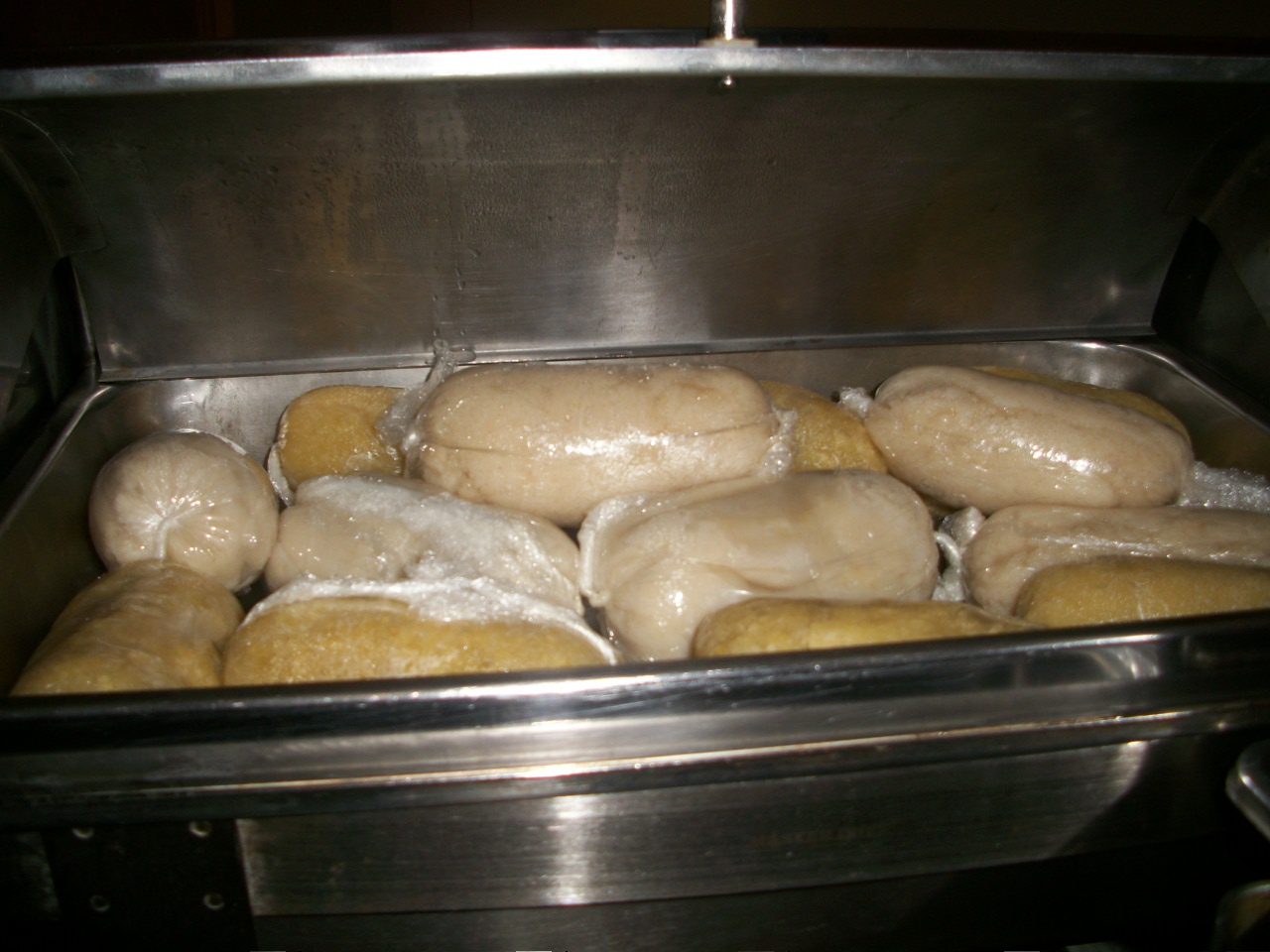
Wraps of Eba and pounded yam

== See also ==
- Akara
- Amala
- Bread
- Cassava
- Egusi soup
- Fufu
- Garri
- Pounded yam
- Sadza
- Ugali
