= Potato fufu =

Potato-based staple food from Nigeria

Potato fufu is a staple swallow food eaten by the northern central region of Nigeria. It is popular among the Yoruba of Kwara state. The swallow food is easy to make compared to pounded yam and its unique taste is why the food is prepared at weddings, parties and other occasions.

== Overview ==
This Okele or swallow food is made from cooked potato which can be supplemented with yam, cassava or flour to make it firm. Blender or mortar and pestle are used to mash the potato into desired size and shape.

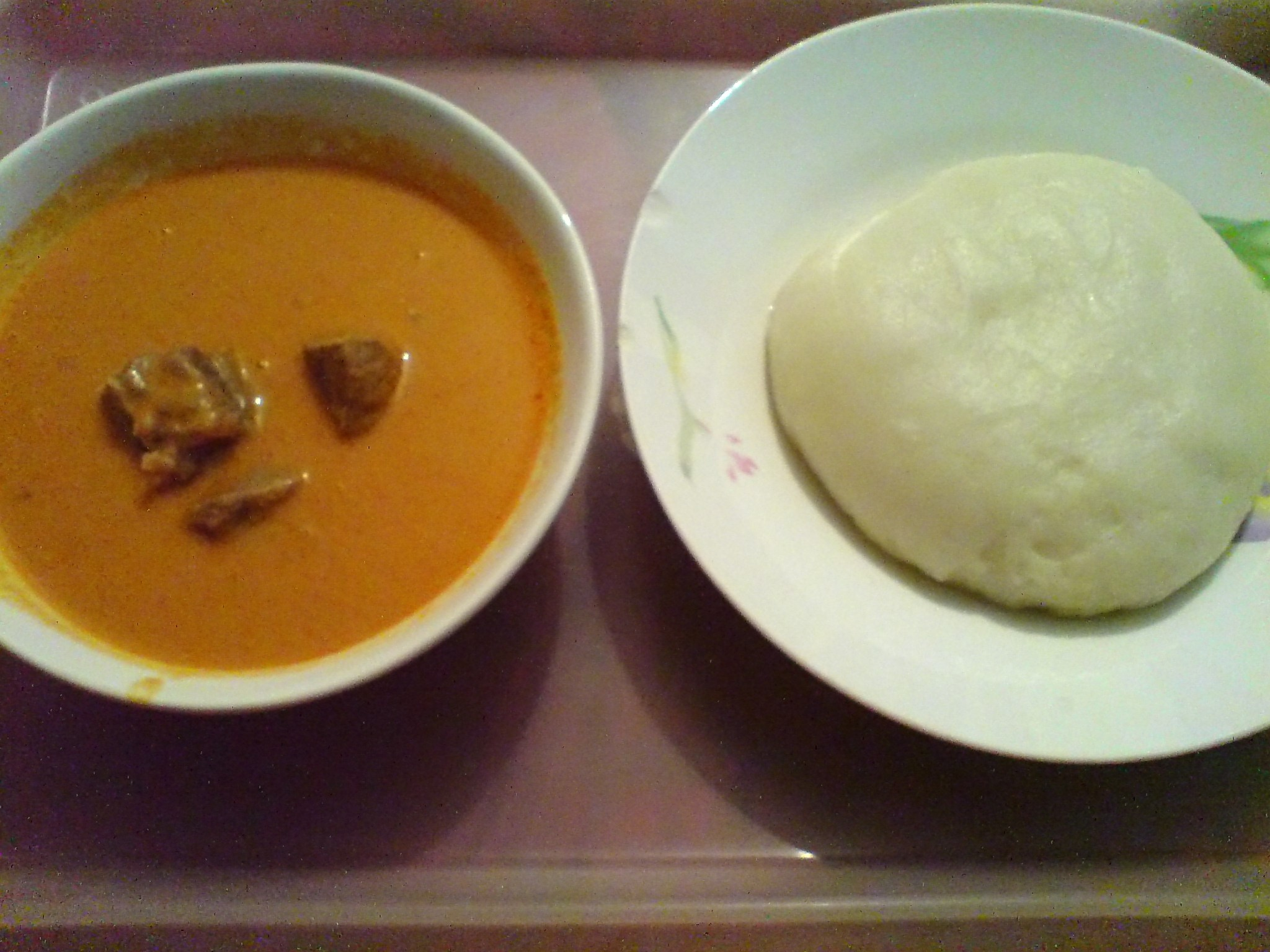
Potato Fufu

== Sweet potato ==
Potato is a tuber harvested within 3–4 months of planting. Nigeria is one of the largest producers of potatoes and it can be processed into different products consumable by man of which one of them is potato fufu.

== Soup ==
Potato fufu is best eaten with okra soup since it is easy to cook and the soup takes lesser time to prepare.

== See also ==
- Okele
- Fufu
- Mashed potato
- West African cuisine
- Ugali
- Staple food
- Soup
- African cuisine
