= Efo riro =

Spinach stew from Nigerian cuisine

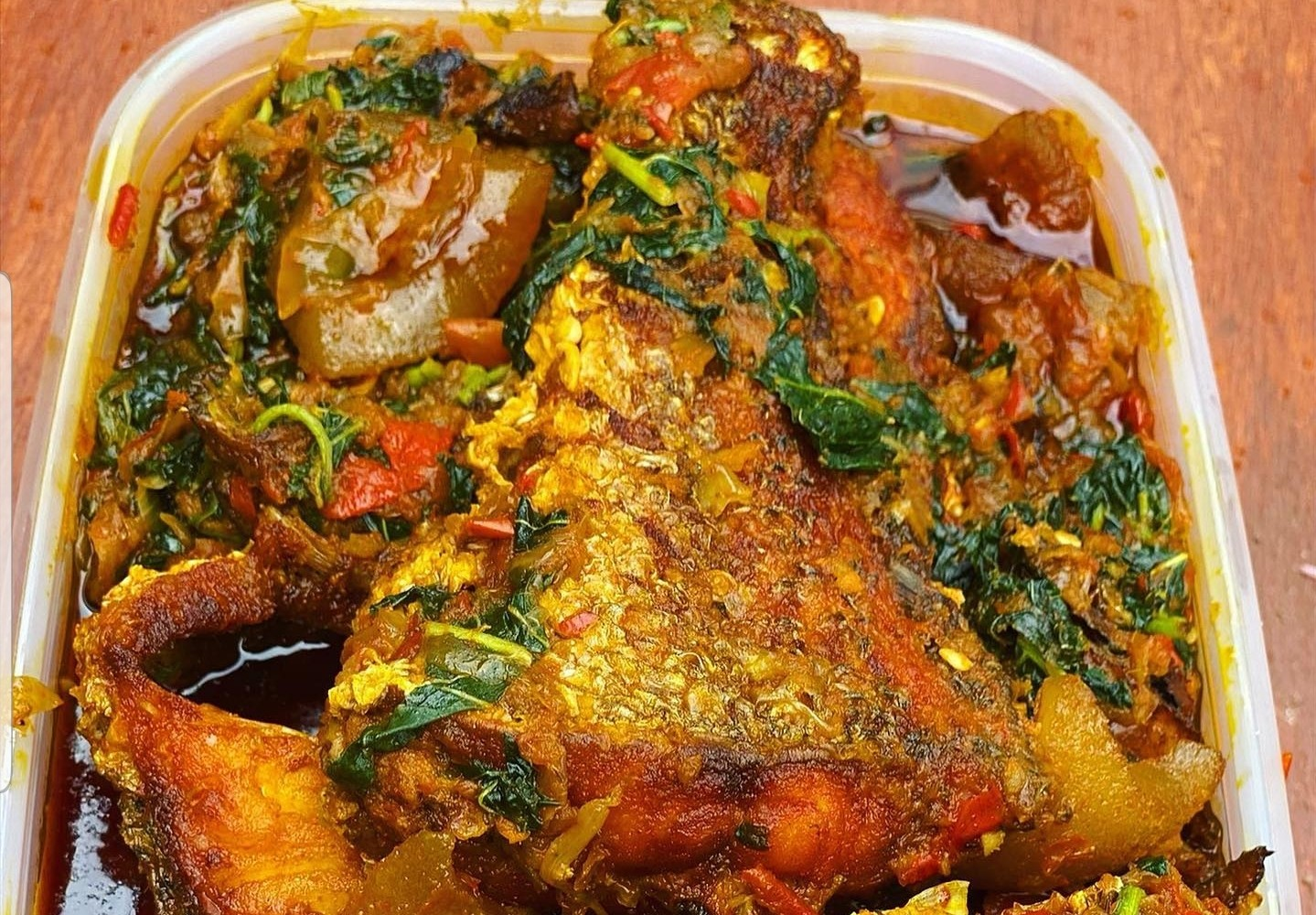
- Type: Dish
- Place of origin: Yorubaland
- Region or state: Nigeria
- Main ingredients: stockfish, Scotch bonnets (atarado), tatashe (red bell pepper), onions, crayfish, water, palm oil, red onion, leaf vegetables, other vegetables, seasonings, meat

Efo riro (Yoruba: ẹ̀fọ́ riro) is a vegetable soup and a native food of the Yoruba people of South West Nigeria and other parts of Yorubaland. The two vegetables most commonly used to prepare the soup are Celosia argentea (ṣọkọ̀ yòkòtò) and Amaranthus hybridus (ẹ̀fọ́ tẹ̀tẹ̀). The history of Efo riro is deeply rooted in the Yoruba culture. It was traditionally prepared with the locally grown vegetables, meat, fish, and a mixture of spices. The choice of vegetables and proteins varies based on personal preference and regional availability. The most commonly used vegetables are spinach, pumpkin leaves, or sorrel leaves, often combined with bell peppers, chili peppers, and onions.

Efo riro is a staple in Yoruba land and is often served at home and during traditional ceremonies. It is typically eaten with iyan, fufu, eba, amala, or other types of okele or "swallow" foods. Over time, the popularity of Efo riro has spread across Nigeria and beyond, with many variations of the dish emerging.
