= Ewedu soup =

Jute leaves soup

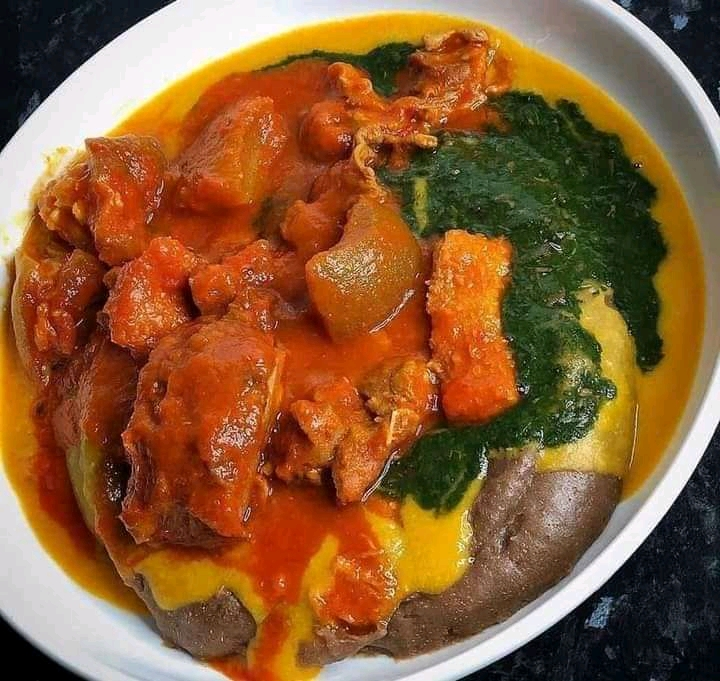
Amala and gbegiri with ewedu soup

Ewedu soup is a Nigerian soup commonly eaten by west African people. It is made from jute leaf and thus also called "jute leaf soup". Similar to okra soup, the soup is viscid in texture and is combined with beef stew and fish stew. Ewedu soup takes about 12 minutes to prepare and is often served with iyan and fufu.

== Production ==
Jute leaf scientifically known as Corchorus olitorius grows in area with water especially lakes and rivers. The best farm for Ewedu leaf is fallow or abandoned land high above 1,250 metres and 1,750 metres altitude.

== Gallery ==
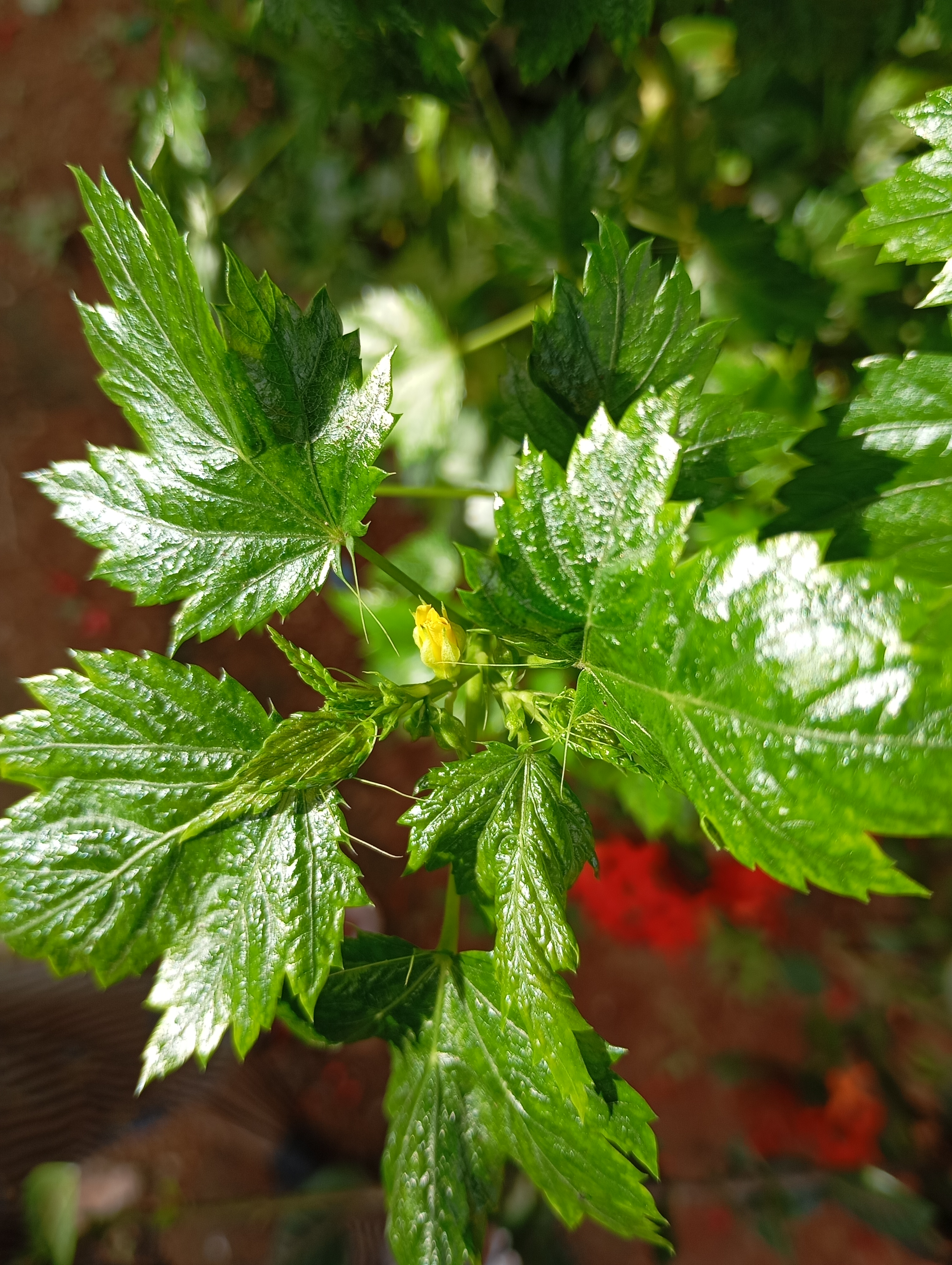
Raw ewedu leaves

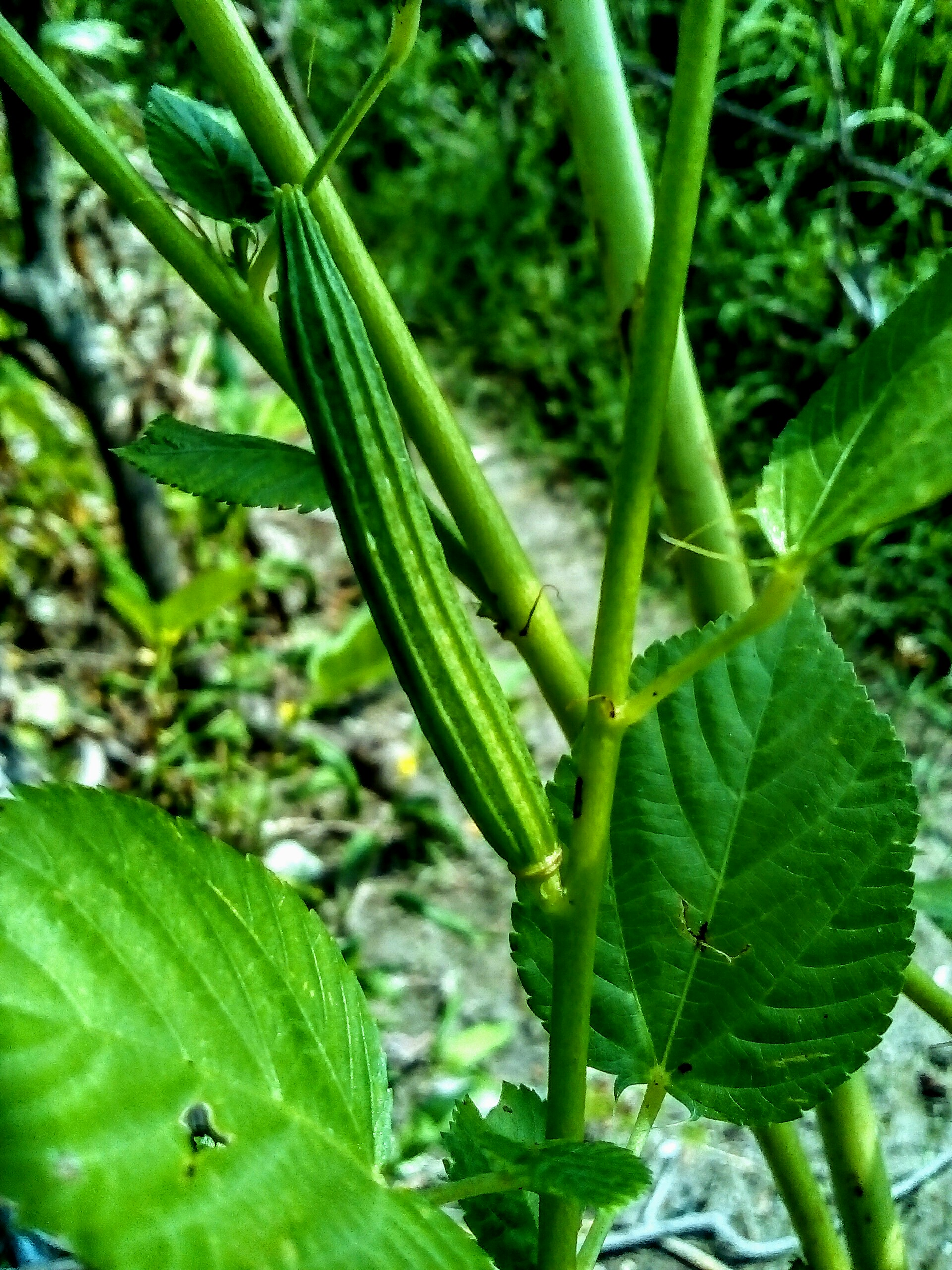
Green jute seed

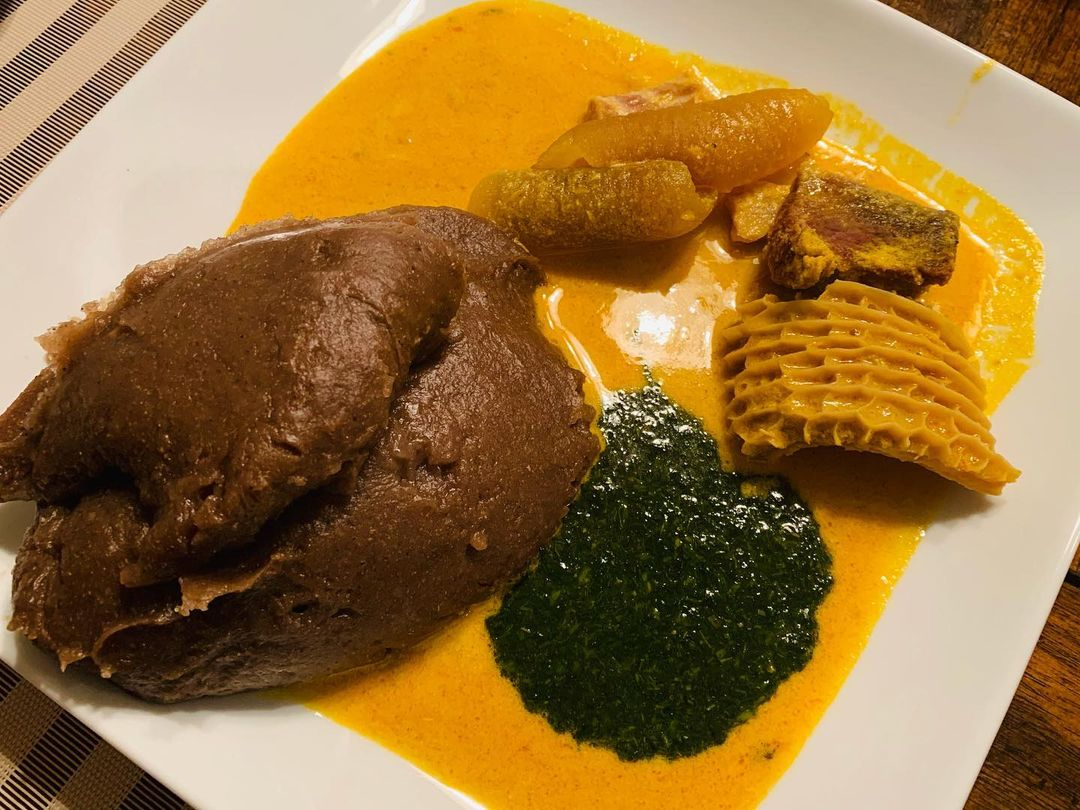
Amala with special soup combination

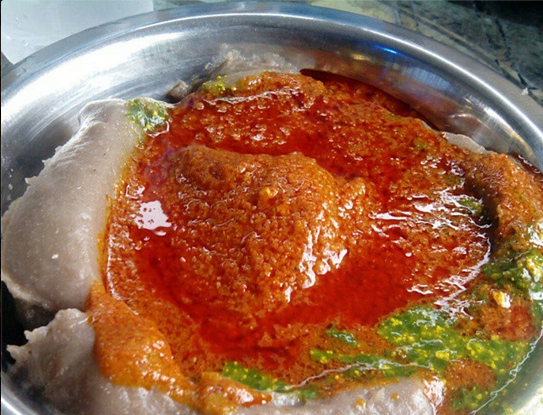
Amala ati ewedu and ogunfe
