= Amala (food) =

Dough-like food from Nigeria

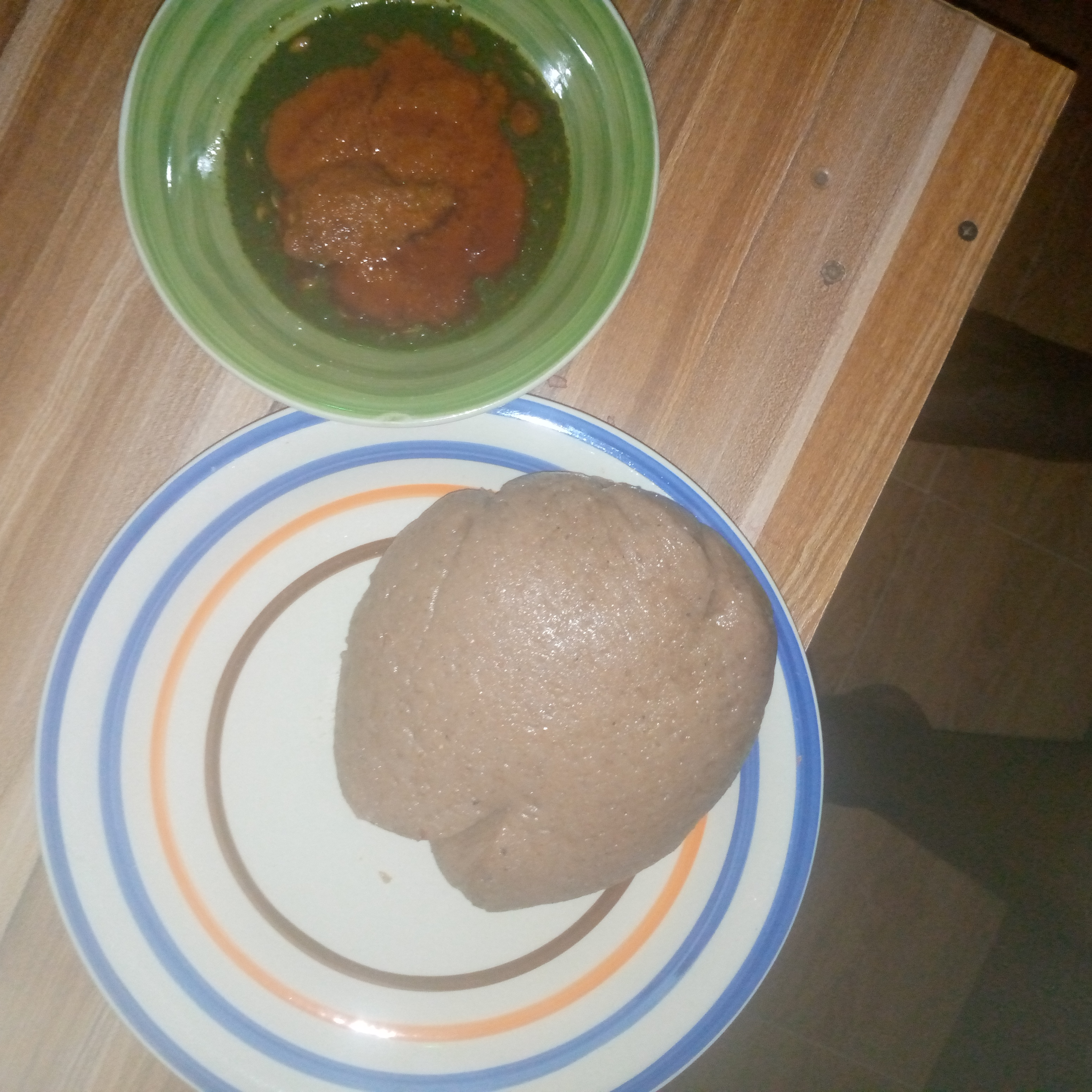
Amala with ewedu

Àmàlà is a staple okele or swallow food originating from and popularized by the Yoruba ethnic group of southwestern Nigeria and other parts of Yorubaland. It is made of yam, cassava flour, or unripe plantain flour. Tubers of yams are peeled, sliced, cleaned, dried and then ground into flour. It is also called èlùbọ́. Yams are white in colour but turn brown when dried which gives àmàlà its colour. It is a popular side dish served with ewédú and gbẹ̀gìrì (black-eyed beans soup), but it is also served with a variety of other ọbè (soups), such as ẹ̀fọ́, ilá, and ogbono.

== Types ==
There are three types of àmàlà: àmàlà isu, àmàlà láfún, and amala ògèdè.

=== Yam flour (àmàlà isu) ===
Àmàlà isu, the most common type of àmàlà, is yam-based. The particular yam species best for preparing àmàlà is Dioscorea cayenensis (Ikoro) because of its high starch content. Because of its perishability, yam is often dried and made into flour. Àmàlà isu is made of dried yam. This gives it a black/brownish colour when added to boiling water. Amala is rich in carbohydrates and is an important source of carbohydrate, especially in the yam zone of West Africa.

=== Cassava flour (àmàlà láfún) ===
Àmàlà láfún is made from cassava flour. Dried cassava flour is known as lafun.

=== Plantain flour (amala ogede) ===
Another type of amala is elubo ogede, which is usually lighter in color. The low carbohydrate level in plantain flour makes it suitable for diabetics. Unripe plantain is peeled, dried, and grated into boiling water, creating a light brown paste when cooked.

== Preparation ==
- Put water on the fire and allow it to boil, then add the yam flour gradually, stirring it continuously to make it smooth.
- Check it consistently to ascertain the softless and smoothless before adding either flour or water.
- Stir it and add little water then cover with a lid and cook for 5 minutes until firm.
- Stir again after 5 minutes and put it down on the fire.
- Serve in a plate or lylon.

== Soups ==
Àmàlà can be eaten with various soups:

- Efo riro: made from vegetables and a mixture of meat, fish, cow skin (ponmo), and other meats
- Egusi: soup made of thickened melon seeds and leaf vegetables.
- Ewedu soup: made from cooked and grated Corchorus leaves with or without a small quantity of egusi and/or locust beans.
- Gbegiri Soup: made from dried beans.
- Okro soup: made from okra.
- Ogbono soup: made from ground ogbono seeds and a mixture of palm oil, stock fish and locust beans (irú) added as garnish.

== Gallery ==
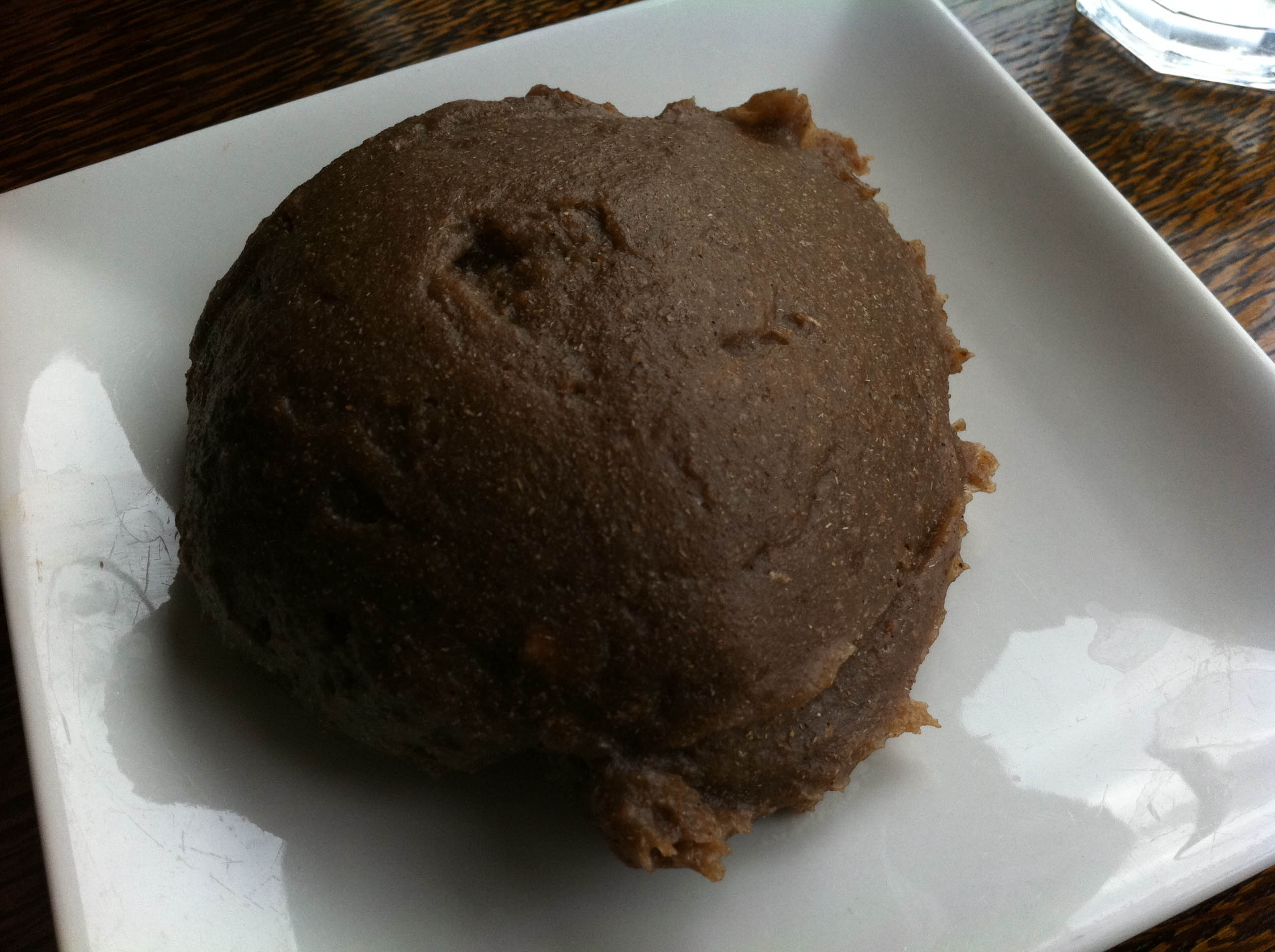
Amala

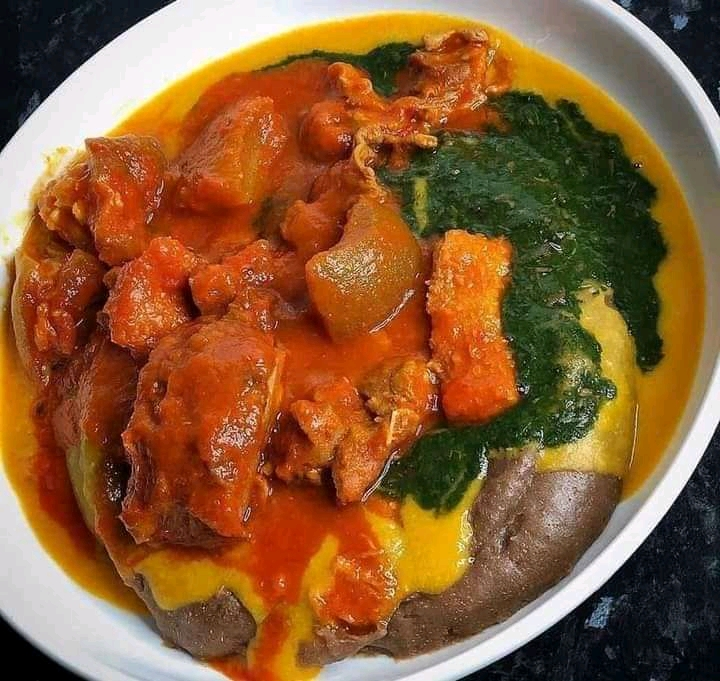
Amala and gbegiri with ewedu soup

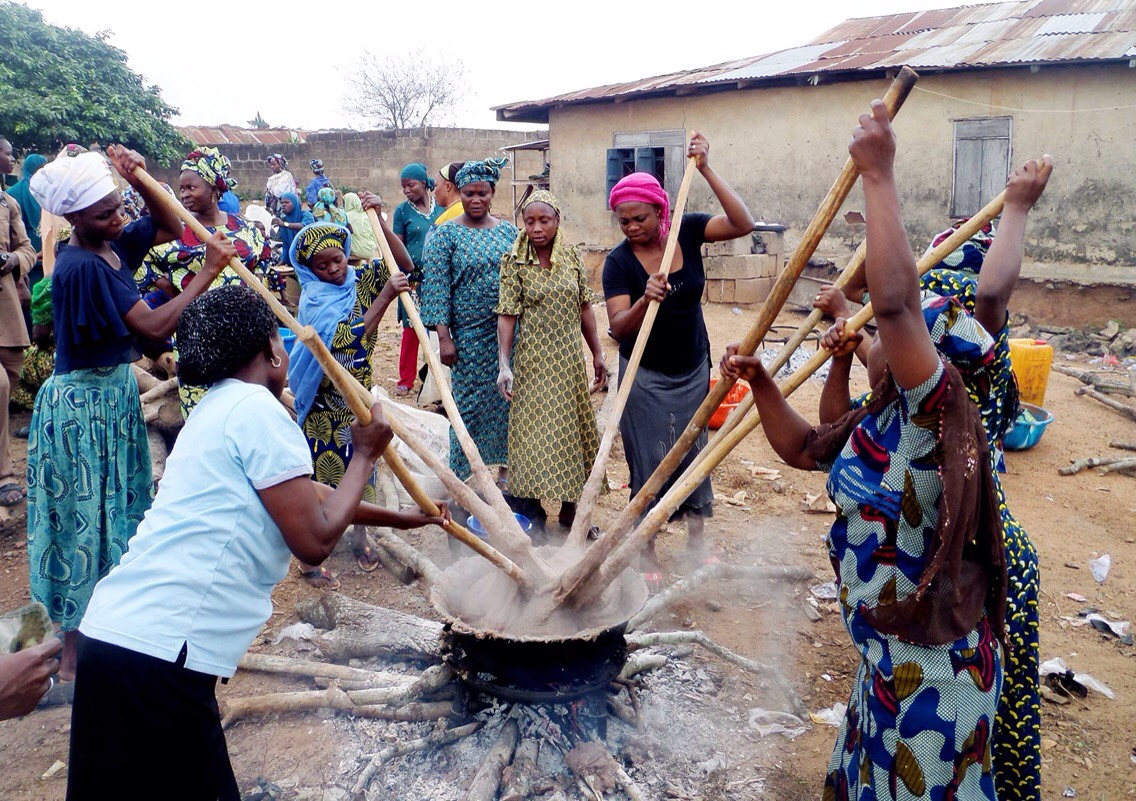
Group of women kneading amala

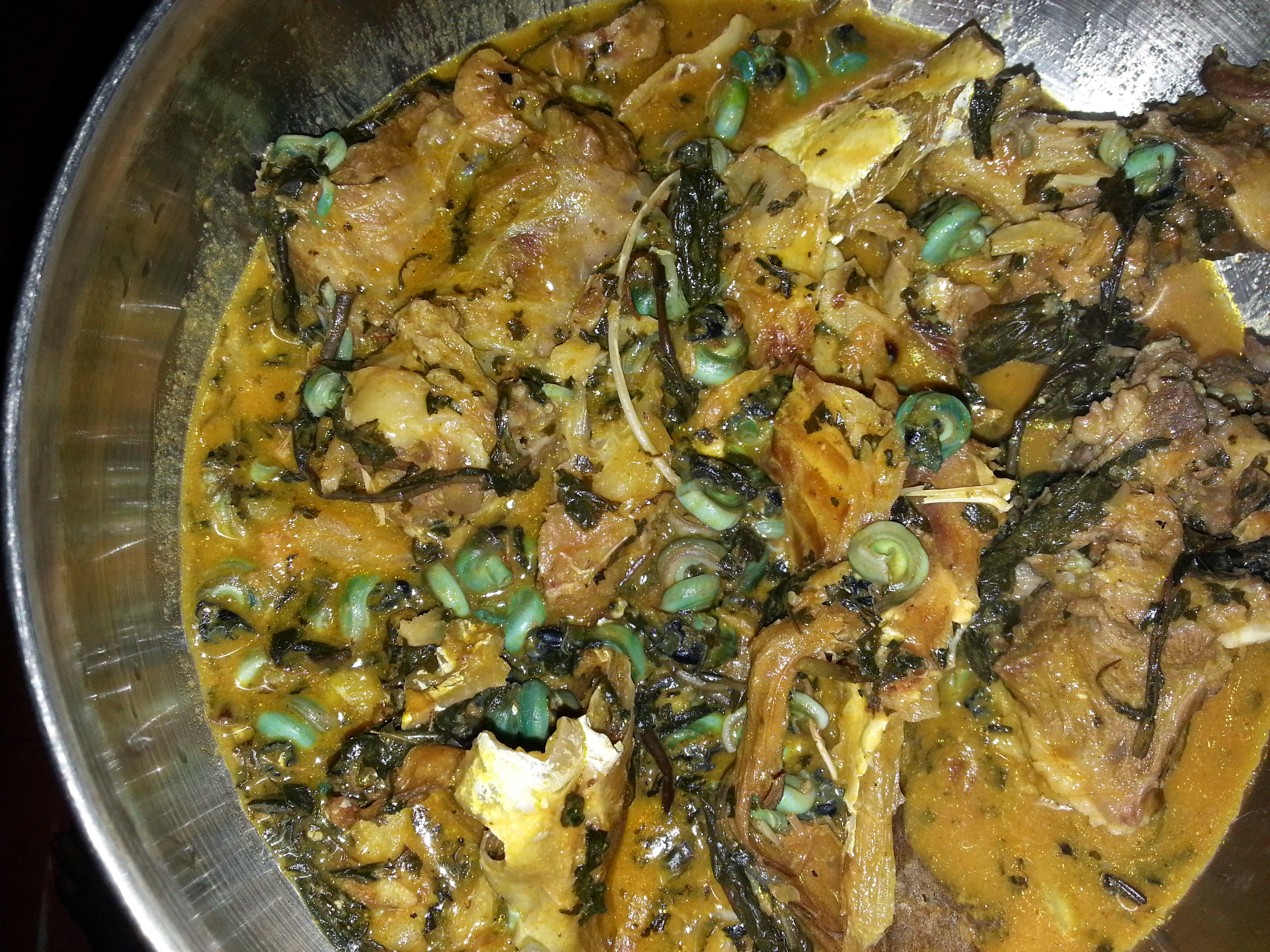
Ogbono soup

== See also ==
- Eba
- Fufu
- List of African dishes
- Nigerian cuisine
