= Garri =

Granular flour from fermented cassava

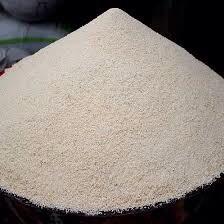
Garri flour

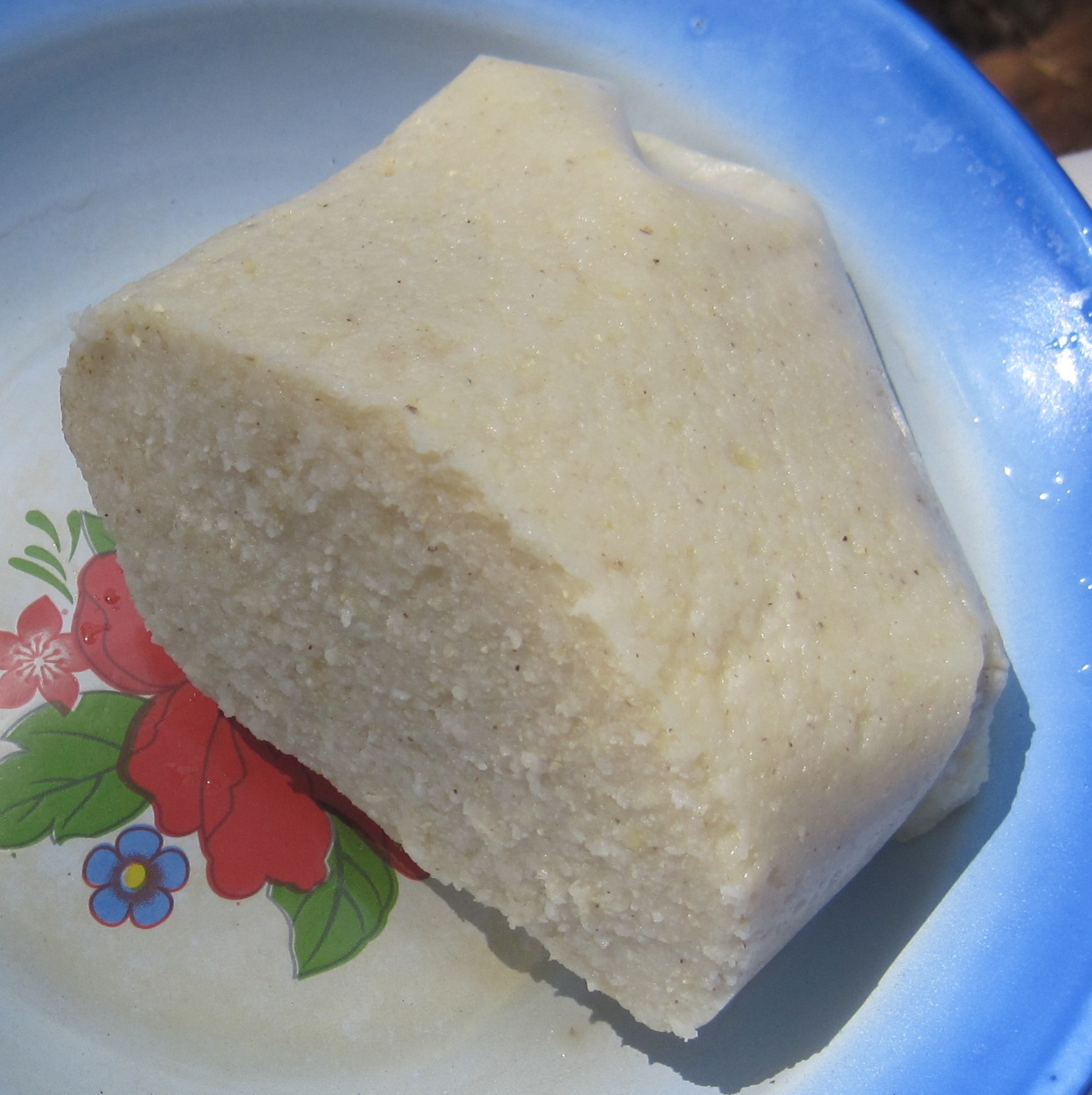
Cooked garri (eba) on a plate in Cameroon

In West Africa, garri (/ˈɡæri/; also known as gari, galli, or gali) is a flour, varying in texture from coarse to fine, made from fresh, starchy cassava root. Heat used in the preparation process helps remove the thermolabile cyanohydrin toxins that occur naturally in cassava plants. Garri is similar to the cassava-derived farinha de mandioca from Brazil, which is used in many food preparations, including farofa, particularly in the Nordeste region. Cassava is rich in fiber, copper, and magnesium.

In the Hausa language, garri can also refer to flours made from other crops, such as guinea corn, maize, rice, yam, plantain and millet. For example, garin dawa is made from guinea corn, garin masara and garin alkama originate from maize and wheat respectively, and garin magani is a powdered herbal medicine. Such flours mixed with cold or hot water form a staple part of the diet in Nigeria, Benin, Togo, Ghana, Guinea, Cameroon and Liberia.

== Preparation ==
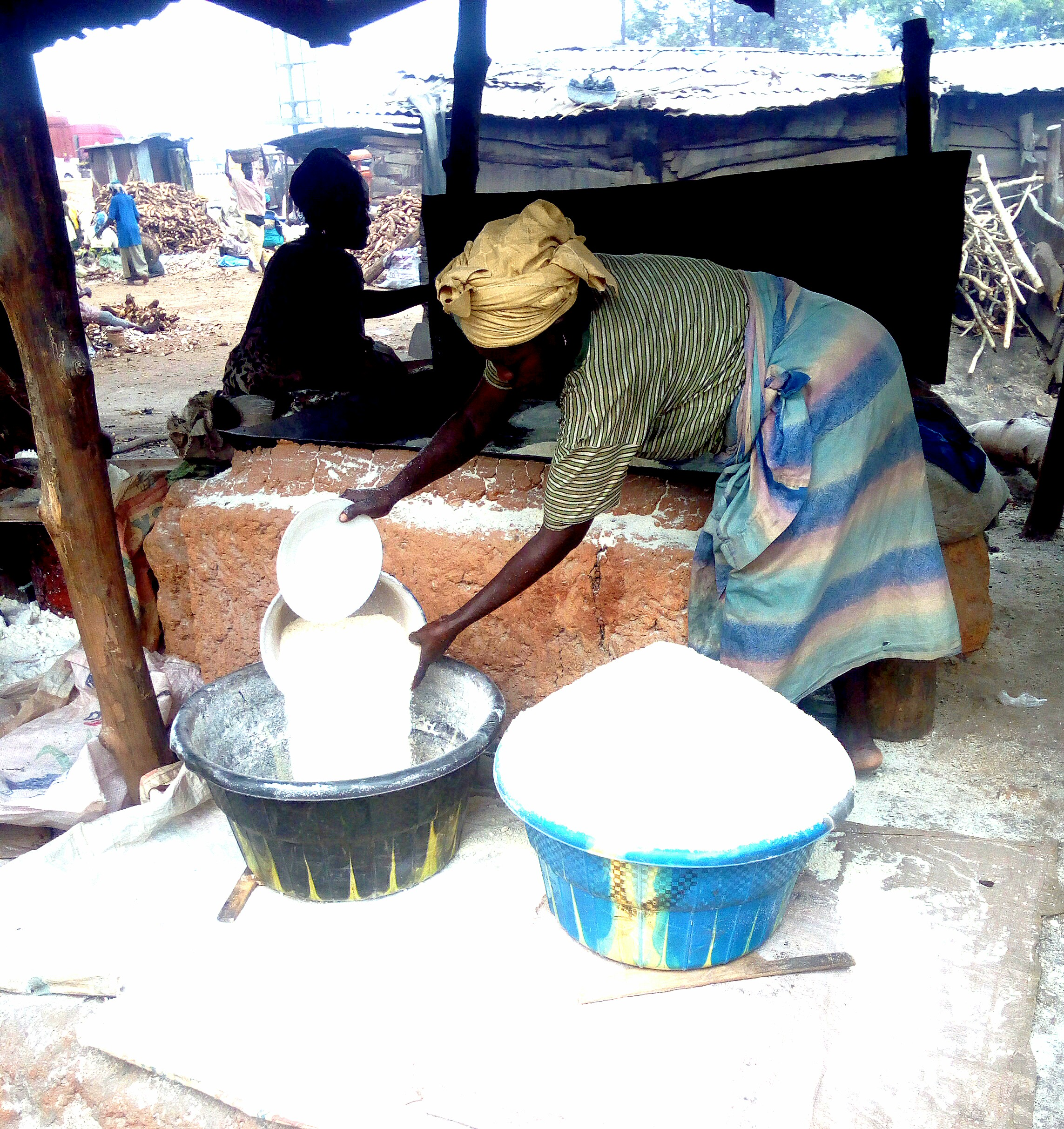
Process of garri making

A look into processing Cassava root into Garri (Cassava granules).

To be made into garri flour, cassava tubers are uprooted, peeled, washed, and grated or crushed to produce a mash. The mash, sometimes mixed with palm oil, is placed in a porous sack, which is then put under an adjustable press machine or iron presser for 1–24 hours to be extracted of excess water. Once dried, it is sieved and fried in a large stainless steel frying pot or in a large aluminum frying tray, with or without palm oil. The resulting dry, granular garri can be stored for long periods. It may also be pounded or ground to make a fine flour. Garri comes in various consistencies, including rough, medium and smooth, which are used to prepare different foods.

== Dishes ==
Eba is a stiff dough made by soaking garri in hot water and kneading it with a wooden baton until it becomes a smooth doughy staple. It is served as part of a meal with soups and sauces. Some of these include okra soup, egusi soup, vegetable soup, afang soup, banga soup and bitter leaf soup. Similar starchy doughs are found as staples in other African cuisines.

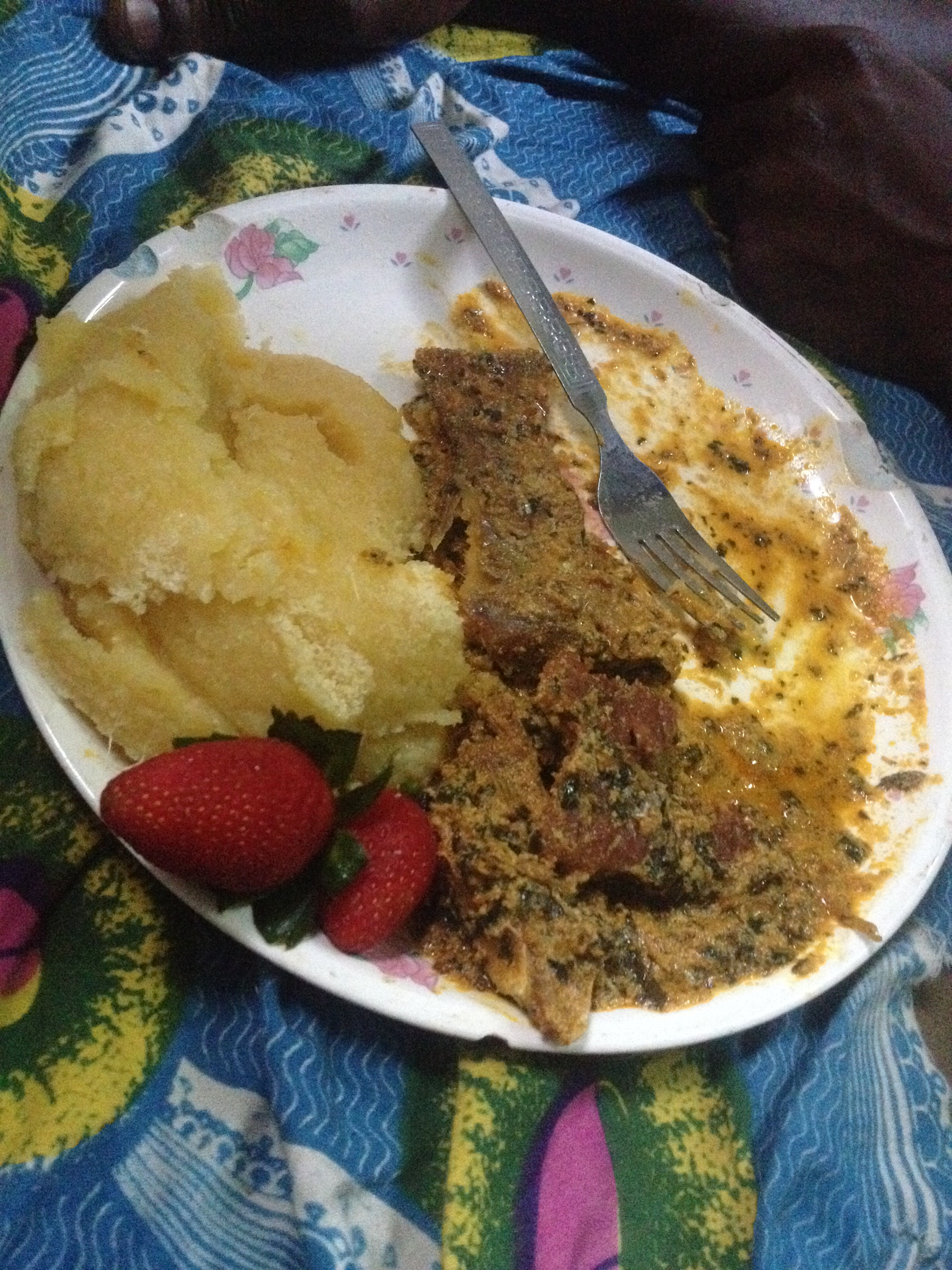
Eba and egusi soup

Kokoro is a Nigerian snack food common in southern and southeastern Nigeria, especially Abia State, Rivers State, Anambra State, Enugu State and Imo State. It is made from a paste of maize flour, mixed with garri and sugar and deep-fried.

As a snack, cereal, or light meal, garri can be soaked in cold water (in which case it settles to the bottom), mixed with sugar or honey, and sometimes roasted peanuts and/or evaporated milk, also known as Soaking Garri. The amount of water needed for soaked garri is 3:1. Garri can also be eaten dry with sugar and roasted peanuts. Other ingredients include coconut chunks, tiger nut milk, and cashews.

In Liberia, garri is used to make a dessert called kanyan which is combined with peanuts and honey.

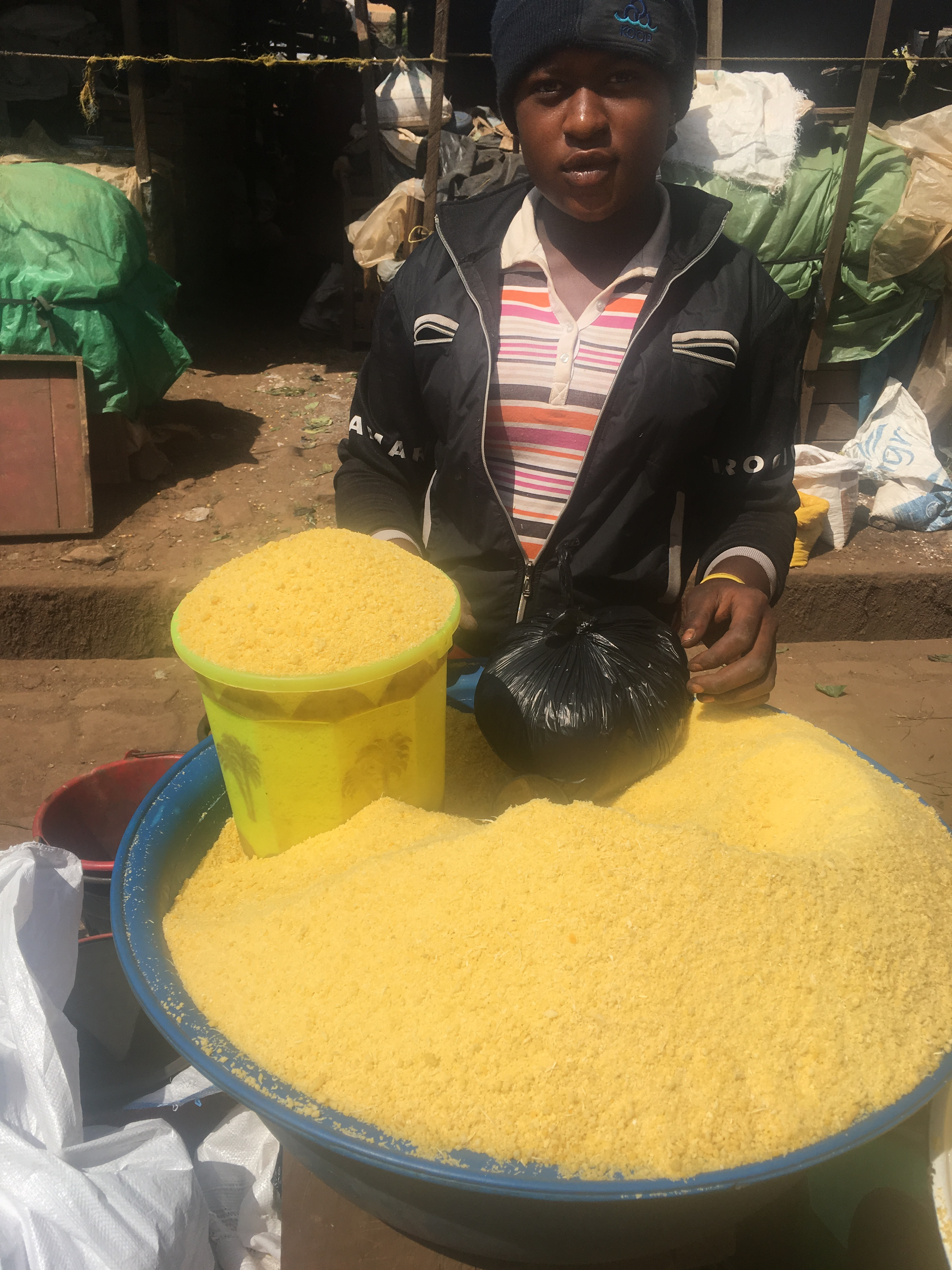
Dry garri flour

In its dry form, garri is used as an accompaniment for soft cooked beans and palm oil. This food mix is called yoo ke garri, or garri-fɔtɔ/galli-fɔtɔ (crushed garri) in the Ga language of Ghana and the Gen dialect of southern Togo and Benin. This type of garri is a mixture of moistened garri kneaded with a thickened tomato paste, oil, salt, seasonings.

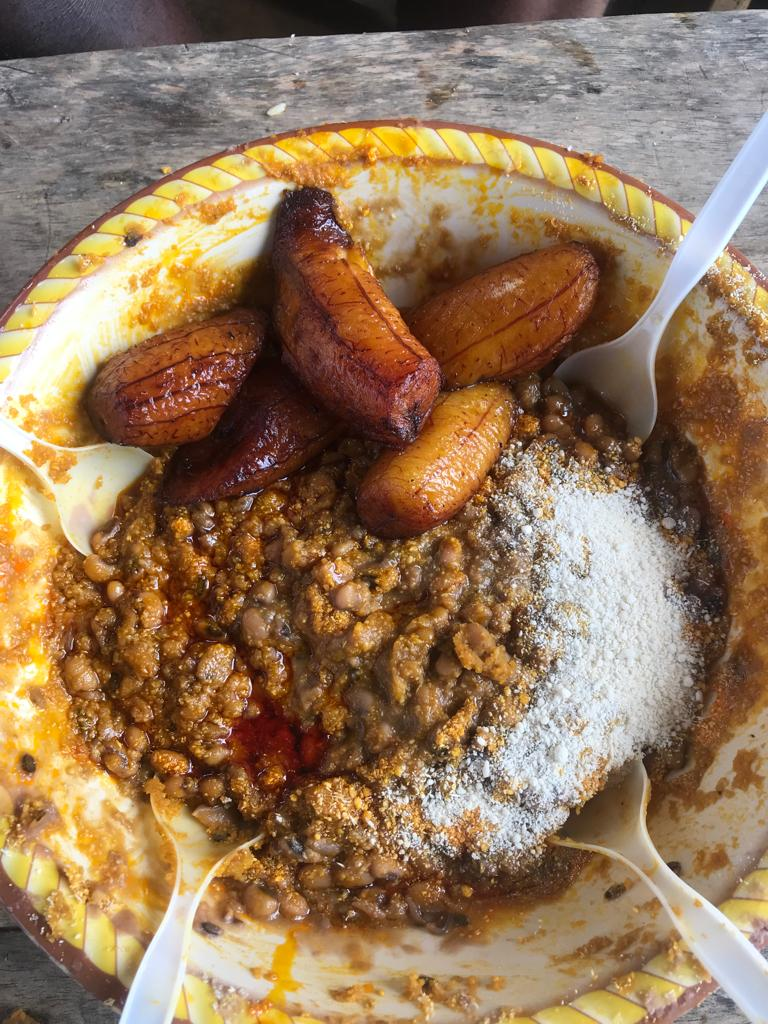
Gari and beans served with ripe plantain.

Garri with beans is common in the southern parts of Ghana, and is popularly called gobɛ, yo ke gari and red red, and is typically eaten as lunch. It is also eaten with bean cake (Akara) in Nigeria.

Smooth garri (known as lebu to the Yoruba) can be mixed with pepper and other spicy ingredients. A small amount of warm water and palm oil is added and softened by hand. This type of garri is served with fried fish. It is served with frejon on Good Friday.

In Nigeria, the Efik people use dry garri to thicken traditional soups.

== Variations ==
In West Africa, two types of garri include white and yellow garri. Yellow garri is prepared by adding palm oil just before the fermenting stage of the cassava mash. Alternatively, it can be made using the yellow-fleshed breed of cassava. White garri on the other hand is fried without palm oil.

Variations of yellow and white garri are common across Nigeria and Cameroon. One variation of white garri is popularly known as garri-Ijebu. This is produced mainly by the Yoruba people of Ijebu in Nigeria.

In Ghana, garri is classified by taste and grain size. The sweeter types with finer grains are more valued over sourer, large grain varieties. Commercial food vendors prefer coarser grains with high starch content, as this produces a greater yield when soaked in water.

Buyers often look out for crisper grains when trying to determine freshness.

== See also ==
- African cuisine
- Similar cassava-based dishes
  - Farofa
  - Fufu
  - Ugali
- Ogi (food)
- Poi
- List of African dishes
- Tapai
