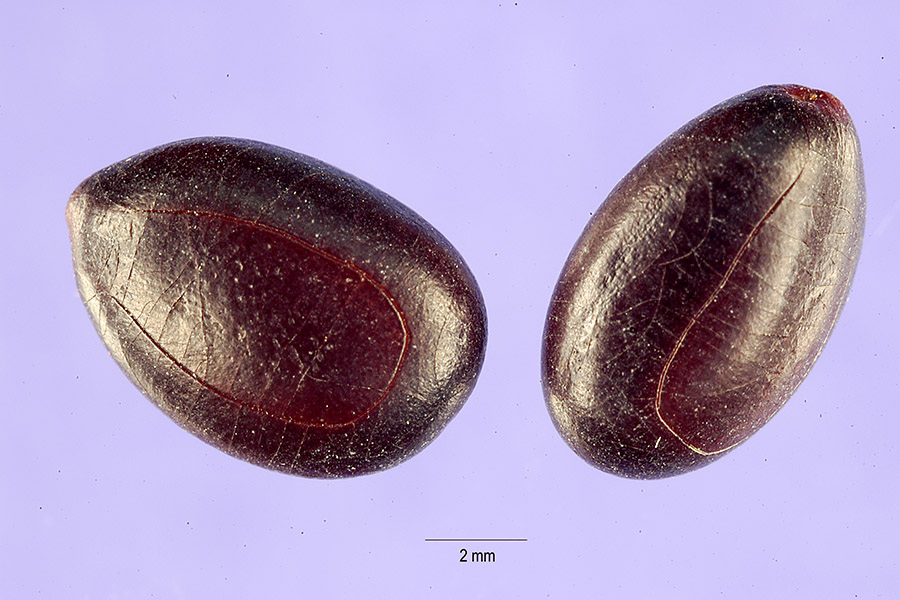
- Anonychium africanum seeds

Conservation status
- Least Concern (IUCN 3.1)

Scientific classification
- Kingdom: Plantae
- Clade: Tracheophytes
- Clade: Angiosperms
- Clade: Eudicots
- Clade: Rosids
- Order: Fabales
- Family: Fabaceae
- Subfamily: Caesalpinioideae
- Clade: Mimosoid clade
- Genus: Anonychium; Schweinf. (1868)
- Species: A. africana

Binomial name
- Anonychium africana (Guill. & Perr.) C.E.Hughes & G.P.Lewis (2022)

Synonyms
- Anonychium lanceolatum Schweinf. (1868); Coulteria africana Guill. & Perr. (1832); Entada coulteri Roberty (1954); Entada durissima Baill. (1866); Prosopis africana (Guill. & Perr.) Taub. (1892); Prosopis oblonga Benth. in J. Bot. (Hooker) 4: 348 (1841)

= Anonychium =

Species of legume

Anonychium is a genus of plant in the pea family (Fabaceae). It includes a single species, Anonychium africanum, a tree native to northern Sub-saharan Africa from Mauritania to Uganda and to Saudi Arabia. It is known by the synonym Prosopis africana, and its common names include African mesquite, iron tree, gele, gueni (in Malinke), okpehe, and somb tree. Okpehe is the name given by the Idoma and Igala people of Nigeria to both the tree and its fermented seeds. All of the other derivatives such as okpeye and okpiye stem from the noun okpehe used by the Idoma and Igala people of present day Benue State of Nigeria.

In the Serer creation myth, it is one of the sacred trees that grew not just first, but also within the primordial swamp on Earth.

Logs harvested from mature trees are one of the hardwoods used in crafting the shells of traditional djembes. Seeds of P. africana are used in Nigeria to prepare daddawa, kpaye, and okpeye, which are fermented products used as food condiments.

Several species of bacteria especially Bacillus subtilis, Bacillus licheniformis, Bacillus megaterium, Staphylococcus epidermidis and Micrococcus spp. were found to be the most actively involved organisms in the production of okpiye. Sequencing of 16S rRNA genes of selected strains representative of the major clusters revealed that the Bacillus strains associated with okpehe fermentation were B. subtilis, B. amyloliquefaciens, B. cereus and B. licheniformis (in decreasing order of incidence). The presence of enterotoxin genes in all B. cereus strains was demonstrated by multiplex PCR. The high incidence of detection (20%) of possibly pathogenic B. cereus strains that contained enterotoxin genes indicated that these fermented foods may constitute a potential health risk.

The seeds also produce a gum.

The plant produces the alkaloids prosopine and prosopinine.

== Sources ==
- Garba, Zaharaddeen N.; Rahim, Afidah Abdul (May 2014). "Process optimization of K_{2}C_{2}O_{4}-activated carbon from Prosopis africana seed hulls using response surface methodology". Journal of Analytical and Applied Pyrolysis. 107: 306–312. doi:10.1016/j.jaap.2014.03.016.
