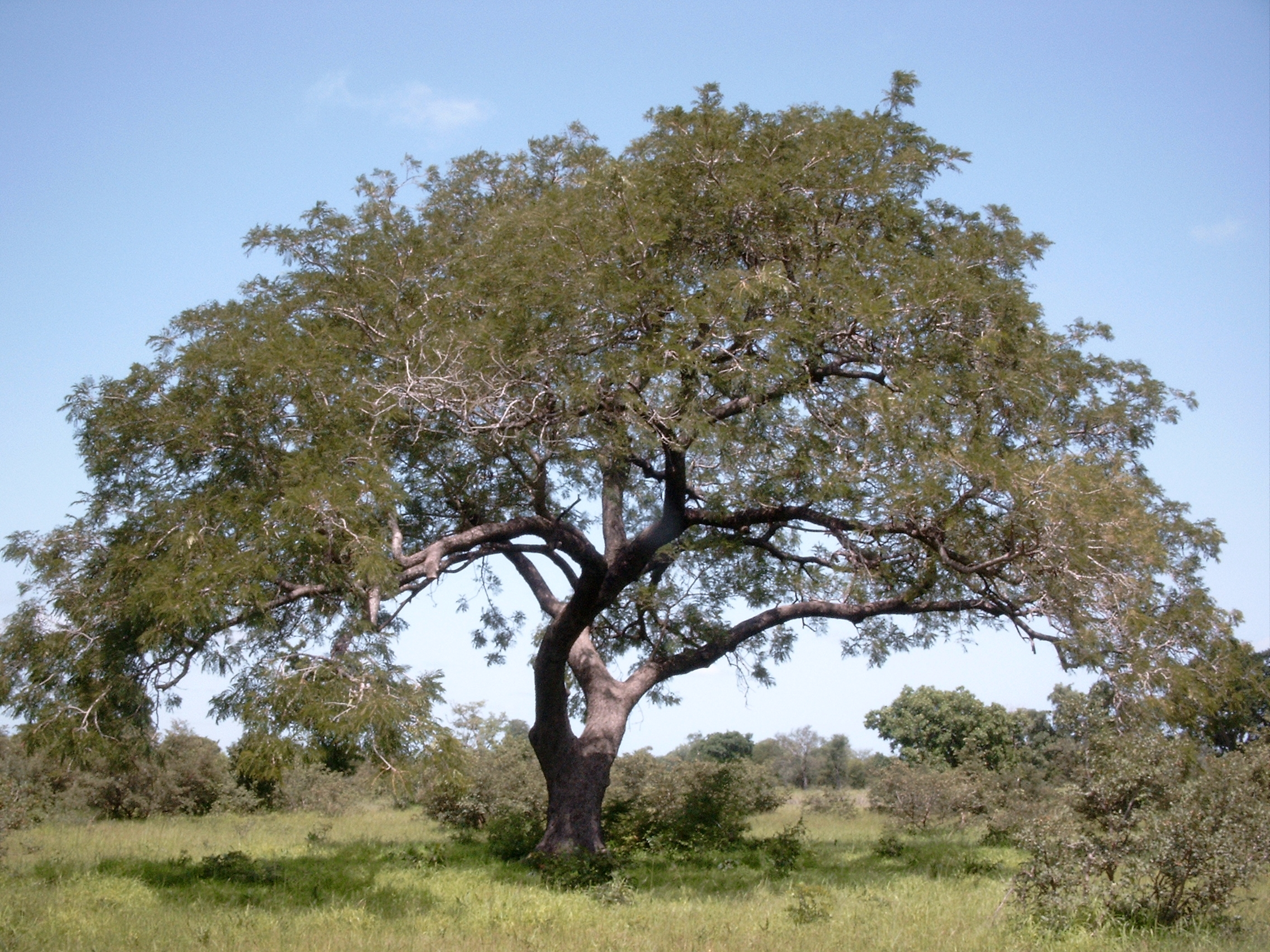

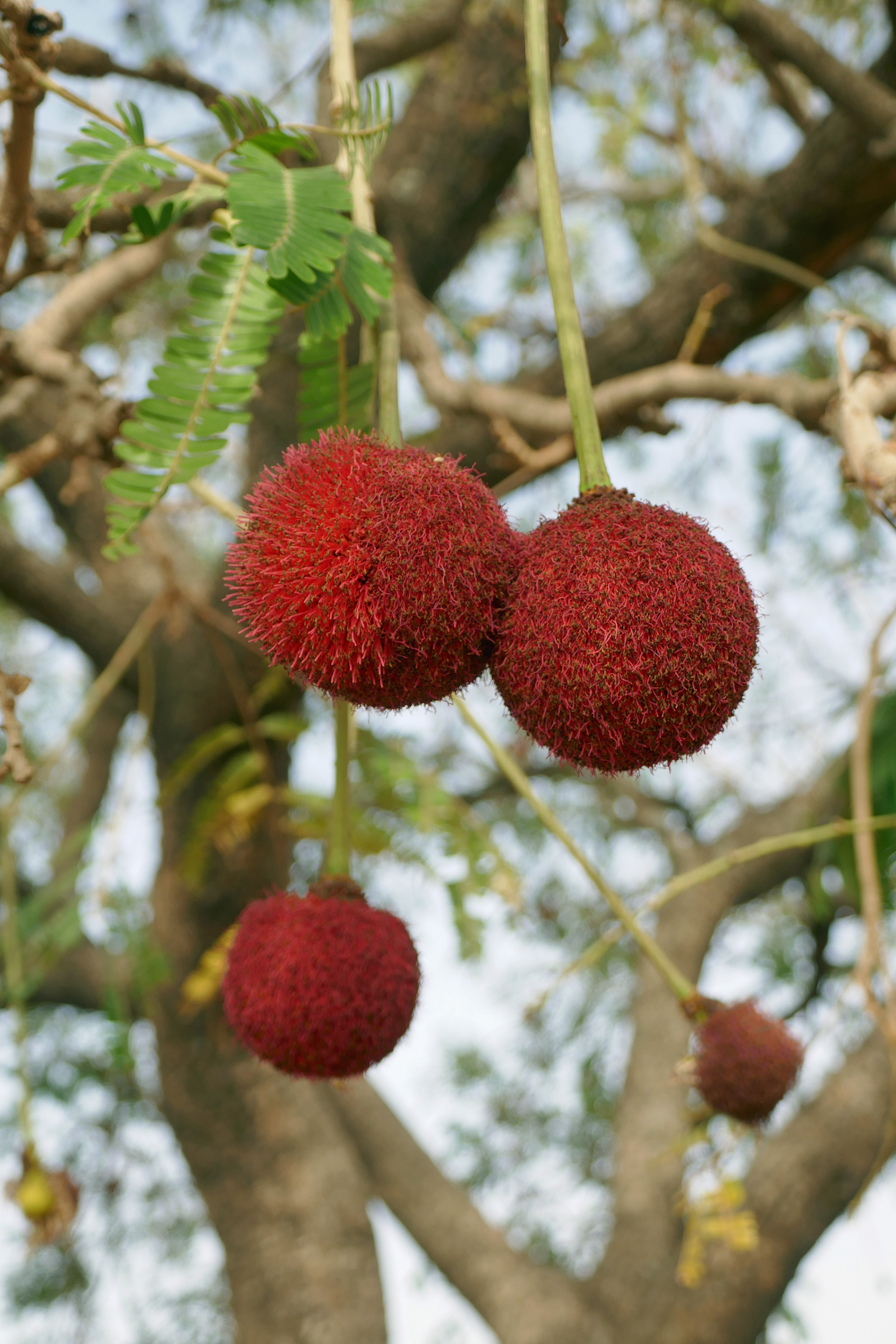
- Inflorescences

Conservation status
- Least Concern (IUCN 3.1)

Scientific classification
- Kingdom: Plantae
- Clade: Tracheophytes
- Clade: Angiosperms
- Clade: Eudicots
- Clade: Rosids
- Order: Fabales
- Family: Fabaceae
- Subfamily: Caesalpinioideae
- Clade: Mimosoid clade
- Genus: Parkia
- Species: P. biglobosa

Binomial name
- Parkia biglobosa (Jacq.) R.Br. ex G.Don

Synonyms
- List: Inga biglobosa (Jacq.) Willd.; Inga faeculifera Ham.; Inga faroba Mérat & Lens; Inga senegalensis DC.; Mimosa biglobosa Jacq.; Mimosa taxifolia Pers.; Parkia africana R.Br.; Parkia clappertoniana Keay; Parkia intermedia Oliv.; Parkia oliveri J.F.Macbr.; Parkia uniglobosa G.Don; Prosopis faeculifera Desv.

= Parkia biglobosa =

Species of legume

Parkia biglobosa, the African locust bean, is a perennial deciduous tree in the family Fabaceae. It is found in a wide range of environments in Africa and is primarily grown for its pods that contain both a sweet pulp and valuable seeds. Where the tree is grown, the crushing and fermenting of these seeds constitutes an important economic activity. Various parts of the locust bean tree are used for medicinal and food purposes. As a standing tree, locust bean may have a positive effect on the yield of nearby crops, like other leguminous plants.

== Description ==
Parkia biglobosa is a dicotyledonous angiosperm belonging to the family Fabaceae (Caesalpinioideae - Mimosoid clade). It is a deciduous perennial that grows to between 7 and 20 metres high, in some cases up to 30 metres. The tree is a fire-resistant heliophyte characterized by a thick dark gray-brown bark. The pods of the tree, commonly referred to as locust beans, are pink in the beginning and turn dark brown when fully mature. They are 30-40 centimetres long on average, with some reaching lengths of about 45 centimetres. Each pod can contain up to 30 seeds; the seeds are embedded in a sweet, powdery yellow pulp.

== History, geography and ethnography ==
In West Africa, the bark, roots, leaves, flowers, fruits, and seeds are commonly used in traditional medicine to treat a wide diversity of complaints, both internally and externally, sometimes in combination with other medicinal plants. The bark is most important for medicinal uses, followed by the leaves. Medicinal applications include the treatment of parasitic infections, circulatory system disorders, such as arterial hypertension, and disorders of the respiratory system, digestive system and skin. In veterinary medicine, a root decoction is used to treat coccidiosis in poultry. Green pods are crushed and added to rivers to kill fish.

The tree locust bean is also known as "arbre à farine, fern leaf, irú, monkey cutlass tree, two ball nitta-tree, nété and néré"). The use of fermented locust beans in West Africa was documented as early as the 14th century, and described by Michel Adanson in his Histoire naturelle du Sénégal, published in 1757.

Geographically, Parkia biglobosa can be found in a belt stretching from the Atlantic coast in Senegal to southern Sudan and northern Uganda. The tree currently exists within a wide range of natural communities but is most abundant in anthropic communities – places where cultivation is semi-permanent.

Annual production of seeds in northern Nigeria is estimated at around 200,000 t. While the products of the tree are not common in international trade, they form an important part of local and regional trade in West Africa. The seeds are especially prized, and much trade occurs locally in the Sahel region where they are transferred between borders.

== Growing conditions ==
=== Seed germination ===
There are two types of seed within each pod – reddish-dark and dark (black). The ratio between these seeds varies from 1:20 to 1:5, with darker seeds outnumbering lighter seeds. Reddish-dark seeds have a thinner coat and they germinate earlier than black seeds that have not first been acid treated. "Dark seeds have a harder seed coat and require various pretreatments to ensure good germination rates."

Although the seeds' usual germination rate has been reported at 75%, germination can be improved by scalding for about 7 minutes, then soaking seeds in hot water overnight prior to planting. Locust tree seedlings "can be established vegetatively in nursery beds by grafting or budding, or by rooting adult cuttings." These methods have shown good results in 11- to 25-year-old trees in Burkina Faso and Nigeria.

=== Agronomy study ===
After the initial sowing into seed beds, seedlings at 3 days old can be transplanted into pots. Seedlings typically reach 20-25 centimetres tall after 20 weeks in the nursery, at which point they can be planted out into the field; direct sowing is possible, but its viability largely depends on soil moisture and the degree of insect/rodent threats. Preliminary ploughing "contributes to proper establishment of seedlings in the field with a success rate of 82% four years" in some cases after planting. Seeds can be treated with concentrated sulphuric acid "in a concentration of 97% for 10 minutes and then immersed in water for 24 hours to break their dormancy period."

Seedlings grow comparatively fast – they can reach a height of 1 metre in just 1 year. They will begin to flower at 5–7 years during the dry season in the Sahel (December to April), while occurring slightly earlier in less dry regions. The tree is pollinated primarily by bats, but can also occur by way of "honeybees, flies, wasps, ants, tenebrionid beetles and tettigometid bugs." Fruiting can occur at anywhere from 5–10 years, and they will start to ripen just before the first rains and continue over most of the season.

Foliage of locust bean has been found to contribute to soil fertility improvement. In one experiment, the isolated relative effect of locust bean in the third year of the experiment was 86%, compared to 138% for neem, a related tree. The relative index of soil productivity during this time clearly appreciated for locust bean, as well as the accumulation of P and organic C compared with neem.

Shade tolerance of other crops planted the near locust bean tree may present additional problems. In a 2-year experiment on shading, Parkia biglobosa was "found to have suppressive effects on vegetative growth and yield of pearl millet in both years." Eggplant yields were also suppressed by trees to between one third and one tenth of the yield in controlled plots, which themselves were damaged by rain. Despite this, chilli pepper yields (which were also affected by rain in the controlled plots) increased by up to 150% under the canopy of the locust bean tree.

=== Biophysical limitations ===
The tree of the African locust bean requires "between 0-300 metres of altitude, a mean annual rainfall of between 400-700 millimetres and a mean annual temperature of about 24-28°C." It prefers well-drained, thick clay soils but can also be found on shallow, thin sandy soils.

== Uses ==
=== Food ===
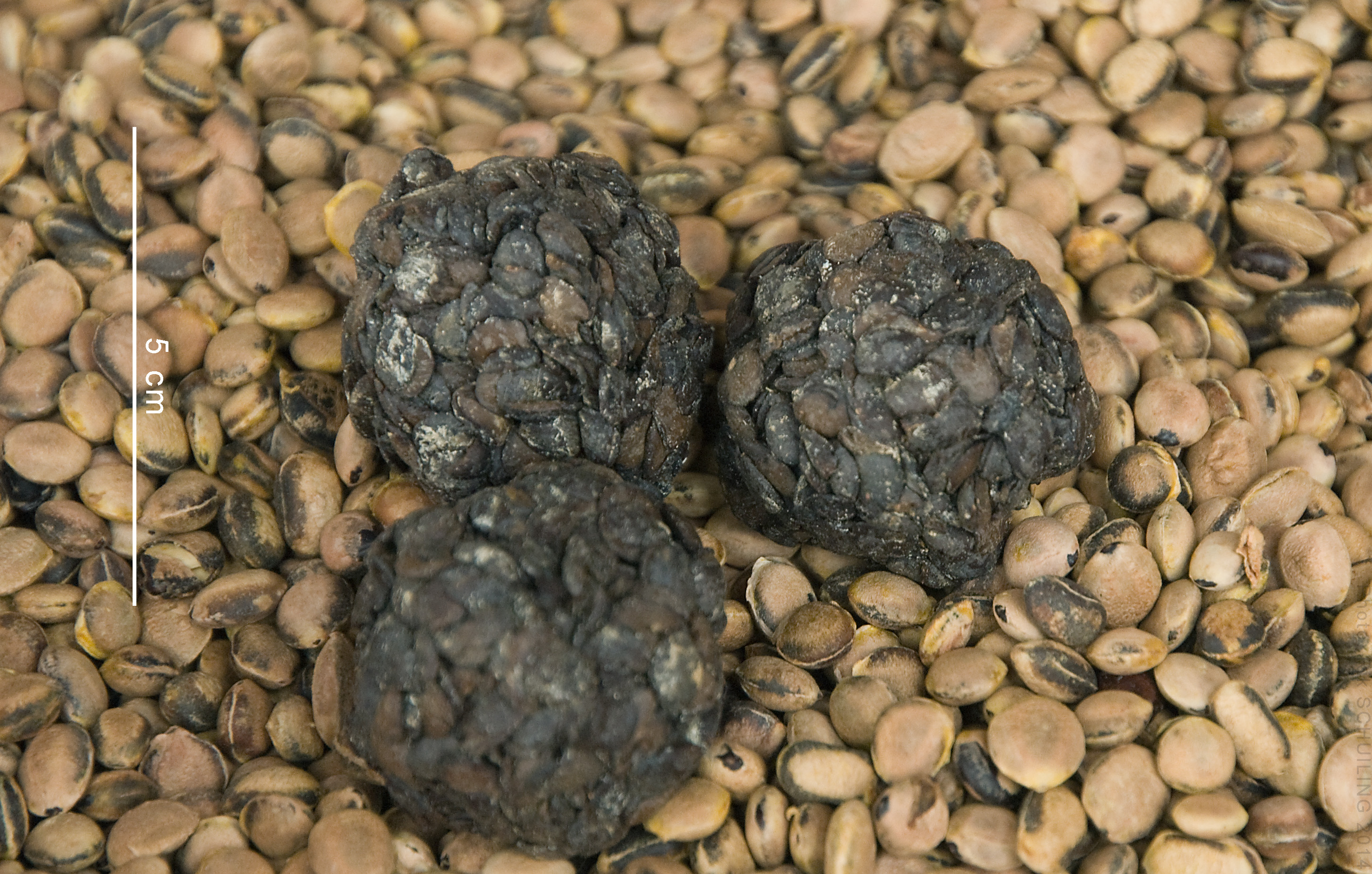
Balls of sumbala (also called daddawa or dawadawa) and the African locust bean seeds they are prepared from.

The yellow pulp, which contains the seeds, is naturally sweet and is processed into a valuable carbohydrate food. The seeds are processed into a seasoning, known as sikomu and dodowa/ dawadawa among the Yoruba and Hausa people respectively, and sunbala in the Inner Niger Delta. The pulp is also used to make beverages.

The seeds of the locust bean are the most valuable part of the plant. They are high in lipids (29%), protein (35%), carbohydrates (16%), and are a good source of fat and calcium for rural dwellers. The seed is first cooked to remove the seed coat and then fermented to produce the desired result. Seeds can then be pounded into powder, then formed into cakes. In a study conducted on the fermentation of dawadawa, it was found that Gmelina arborea and banana leaves accelerated fermentation of seeds, while increasing fat, protein and moisture content, but also decreasing carbohydrate content.

=== Animal feed ===
The fruit pulp, the leaves and the seeds are also used to feed livestock and poultry. The flowers are attractive to bees and a good source of nectar.

=== Economic activity ===
The cultivation of this tree is an important economic activity for many in Africa, including many women. Néré fruits are highly commercialized in Burkina Faso; "over 50% of respondents in a nation-wide survey said they participated in its trade." In general, women are wholly responsible for the sale of fermented seeds (dawadawa) even though men and women are equally responsible for the sale of dry seeds.

=== Medical ===
Indigenous healers in Africa use different parts of the locust bean tree for health benefits. In a survey conducted on healers in Togo, Parkia biglobosa was one of the highest cited plants used for treating hypertension. The tree was also one of two plants "listed as having real wound-healing properties in South-Western Nigeria, influencing the proliferation of dermal fibroblasts significantly." In a similar survey conducted in Guinea relating to their use of antimalarial plants, Parkia biglobosa was cited among those most often successfully used. In an analysis on the antibacterial properties of the plant, another study found that "these properties compare favourably with those of streptomycin, making it a potential source of compounds used in the management of bacterial infections."
