= Prosopine =

Names
- IUPAC name 6-(11-hydroxydodecyl)-2-(hydroxymethyl)piperidin-3-ol
- Other names 6-(11-hydroxydodecyl)-2-(hydroxymethyl)piperidin-3-ol Prosopin

Identifiers
CAS Number	14058-38-9
3D model (JSmol)	Interactive image
ChemSpider	279321
PubChem CID	315679
UNII	K8E2SWY6FF
CompTox Dashboard (EPA)	DTXSID10311336
- InChI: InChI=1S/C18H37NO3/c1-15(21)10-8-6-4-2-3-5-7-9-11-16-12-13-18(22)17(14-20)19-16/h15-22H,2-14H2,1H3 Key: FLPXYDHRVFVGRJ-UHFFFAOYSA-N
- SMILES: CC(CCCCCCCCCCC1CCC(C(N1)CO)O)O

Properties
Chemical formula	C_{18}H_{37}NO_{3}
Molar mass	315.49 g/mol
- Except where otherwise noted, data are given for materials in their standard state (at 25 °C [77 °F], 100 kPa). Infobox references

Prosopine is an alkaloid found in Prosopis africana.
