= Ogiri =

Fermented oil seed used as a flavouring

Ogiri is a traditional fermented seasoning originating from southeastern Nigeria, particularly among the Igbo people. It is typically produced from fermented oil-rich seeds, including castor seeds (ogiri-igbo) and melon seeds. Ogiri has a strong, pungent aroma and a distinctive savoury flavour. It is commonly used as a flavour enhancer in traditional Nigerian soups and dishes, including oha, bitterleaf, egusi and nsala soup.

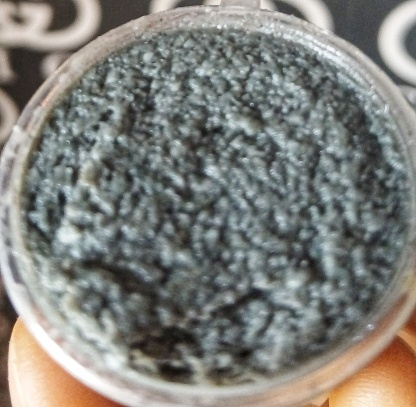
Fully processed Ogiri Igbo

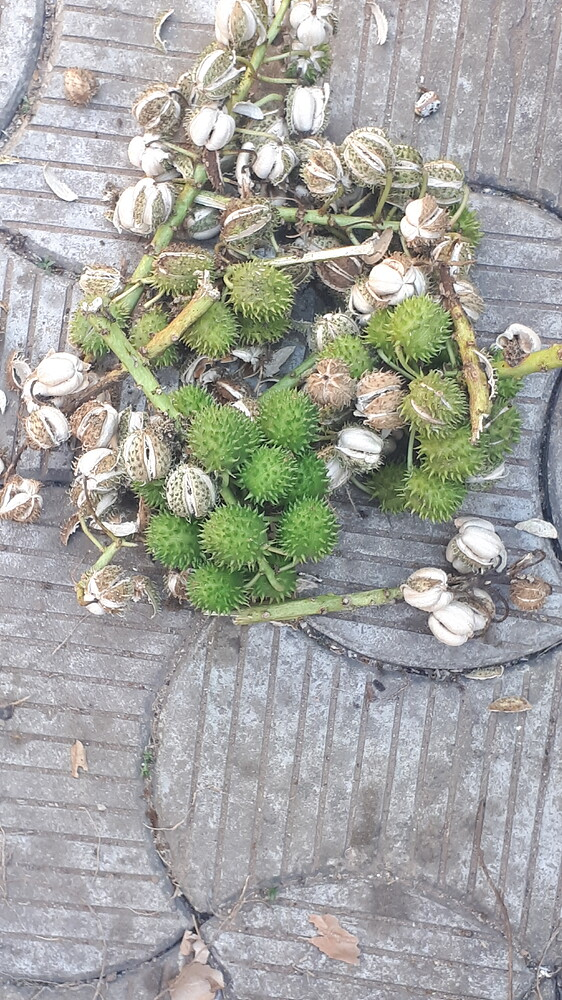
Castor oil fruit, containing seeds (Mkpụrụ Ogiri)

Ogiri is traditionally made from the fermentation of egusi (melon seeds), although there are other types of Ogiri made from different seed substrates, such as sesame, castor oil beans (Ogiri Igbo), fluted pumpkin seeds, watermelon seeds, and peanuts, all produced at lower frequencies.

.

The process and product of making Ogiri is similar to those of; Iru, douchi, and other fermented food products. Its smell is similar to cheese, miso, or stinky tofu.

Ogiri is best known in West Africa. It is popular among the ,Igbo people, and Including among the Krio of Sierra Leone who call it by the same name – Ogiri saro,. Ogiri as known among the Igbo people of Nigeria is different and similar to Iru Pete, which is iru in its mashed form. A similar condiment known locally as Okpehe, Okpei, Okpiye, or Ogiri Okpei is native to the Igala and Idoma people of Nigeria's Middle Belt, it is however made from African mesquite bean seeds, specifically Anonychium.
