= Condiment =

Substance added to food for flavour

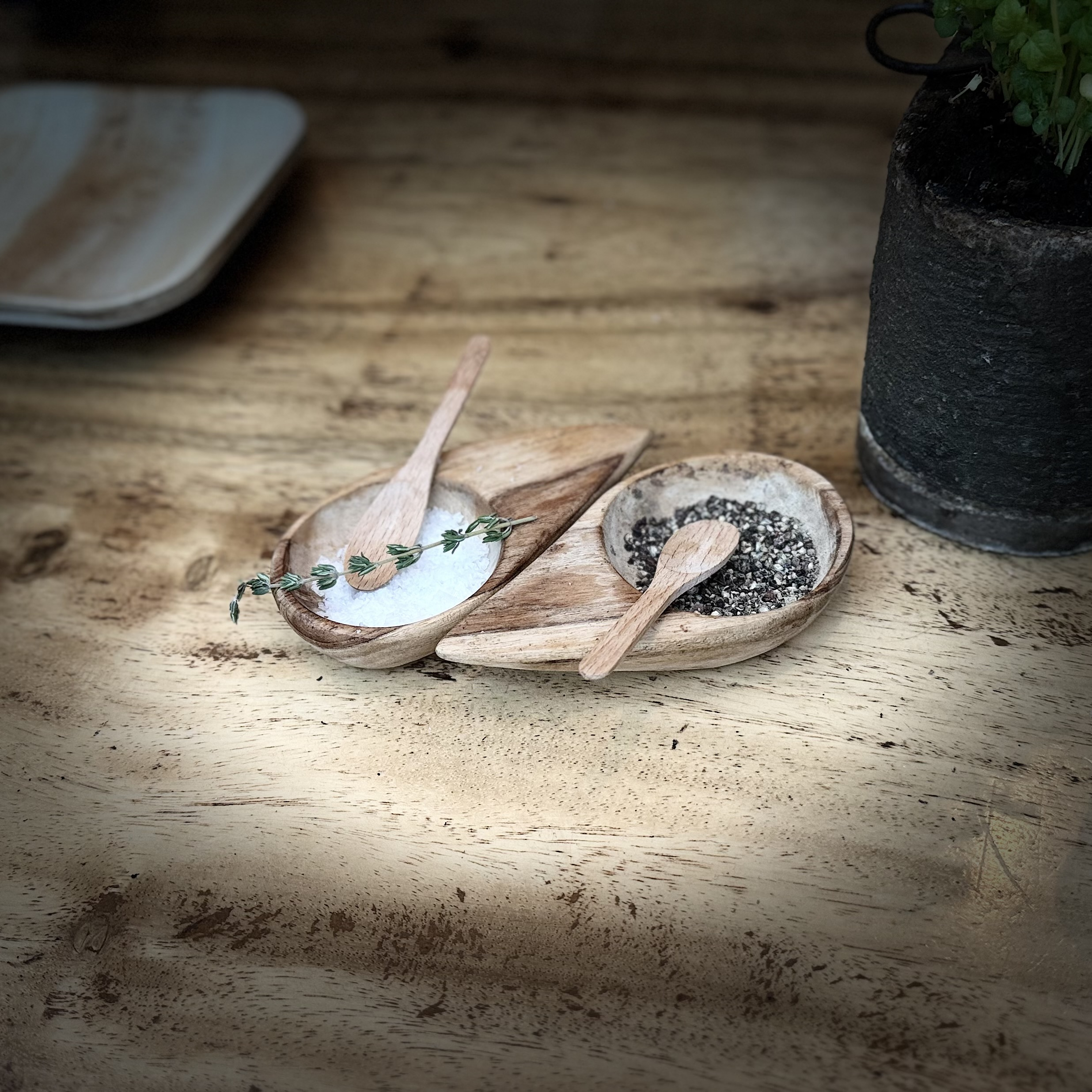
Salt and pepper at a modern restaurant

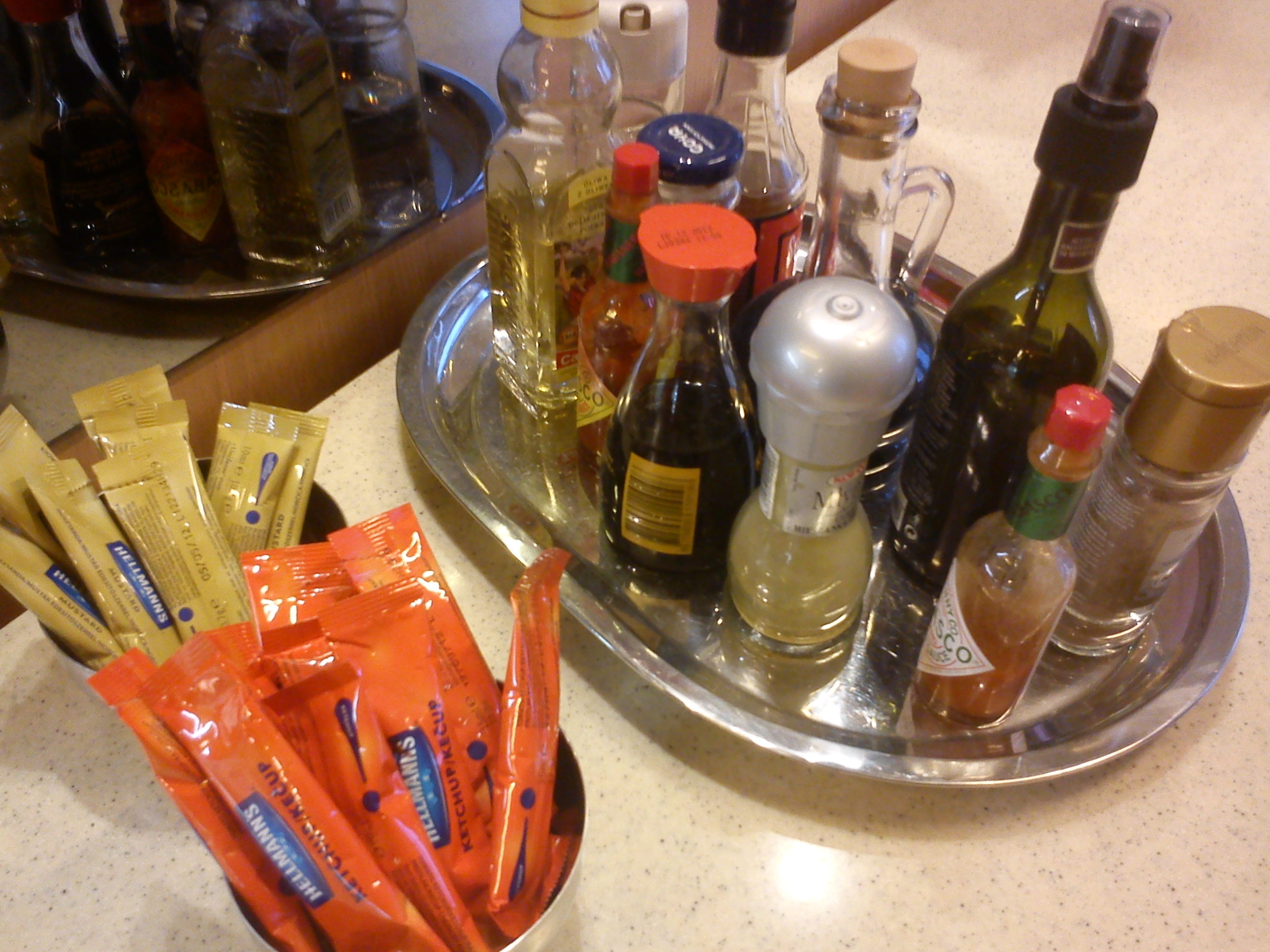
Tray of condiments and spices

A condiment is a preparation that is added to food, typically after cooking, to enhance the flavor, to complement the dish, or to impart a specific flavor. Such specific flavors generally add sweetness or pungency, or sharp or piquant flavors. The seasonings and spices common in many different cuisine arise from global introductions of foreign trade. Condiments include those added to cooking to impart flavor, such as barbecue sauce and soy sauce; those added before serving, such as mayonnaise in a sandwich; and those added tableside to taste, such as ketchup with fast food. Condiments can also provide other health benefits to diets that lack micronutrients.

== Definition ==
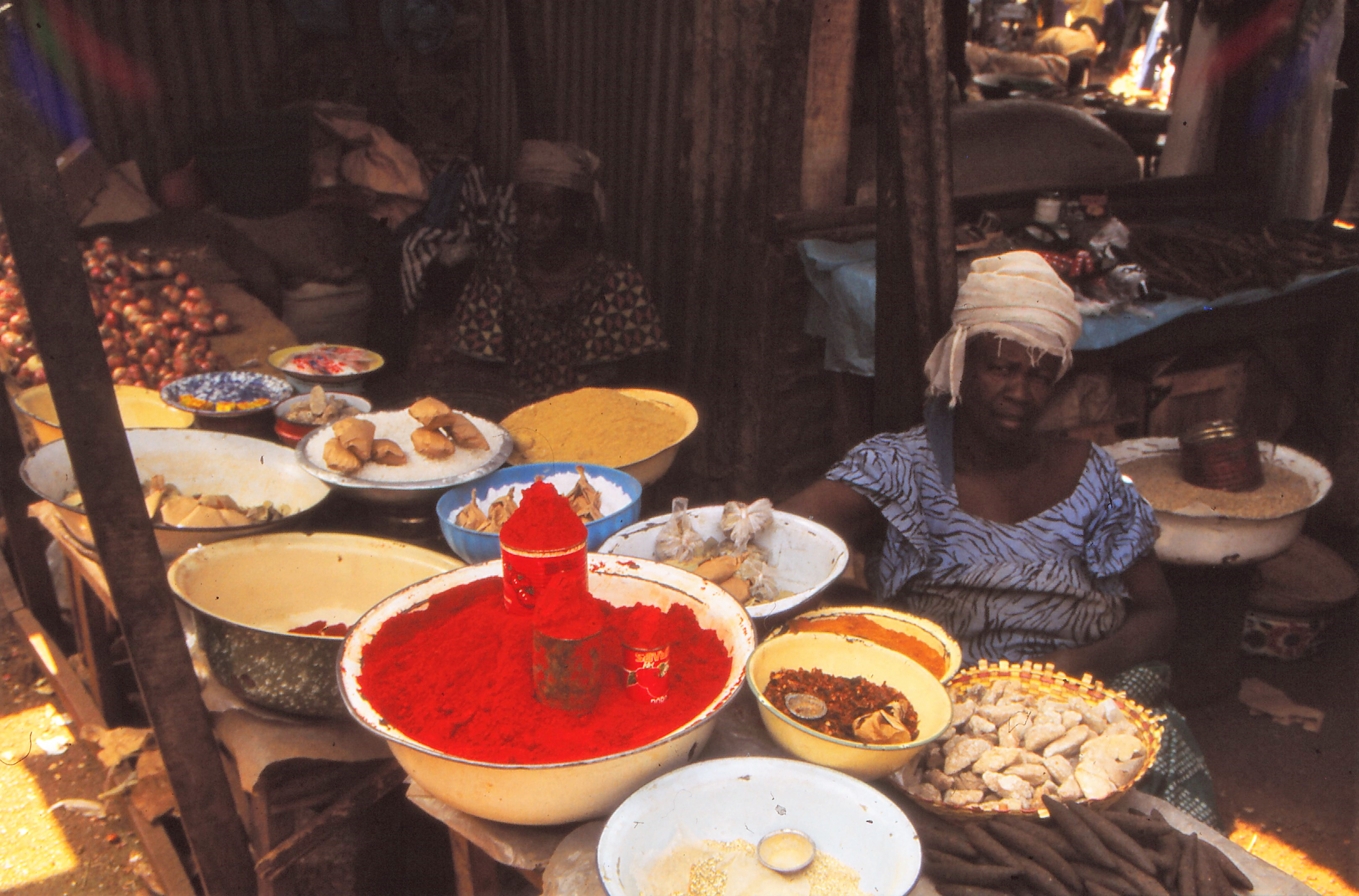
Various condiments at a market in Sangha, Mali, in 1992

The exact definition of a condiment varies. Some definitions encompass spices and herbs, including salt and pepper, using the term interchangeably with seasoning. Others restrict the definition to include only "prepared food compound[s], containing one or more spices", which are added to food after the cooking process, such as mustard, ketchup or mint sauce.

The Culinary Institute of America defines condiments as an "aromatic mixture" that "accompanies food", giving the examples of chutney, pickles and some sauces.

== Types ==
Condiments added during cooking to add flavor include barbecue sauce, compound butter, teriyaki sauce, soy sauce, iru, ogiri, Marmite and sour cream.

Condiments can also be added prior to serving, for example in a sandwich made with ketchup, mustard or mayonnaise.

A table condiment or table sauce is served separately from the food and added to taste by the diner. Many, such as mustard or ketchup, are available in single-serving packets, commonly when supplied with take-out or fast food meals. In traditional Asian restaurant settings, common condiments such as soy sauce, vinegar, chili oil, and shichimi are available.

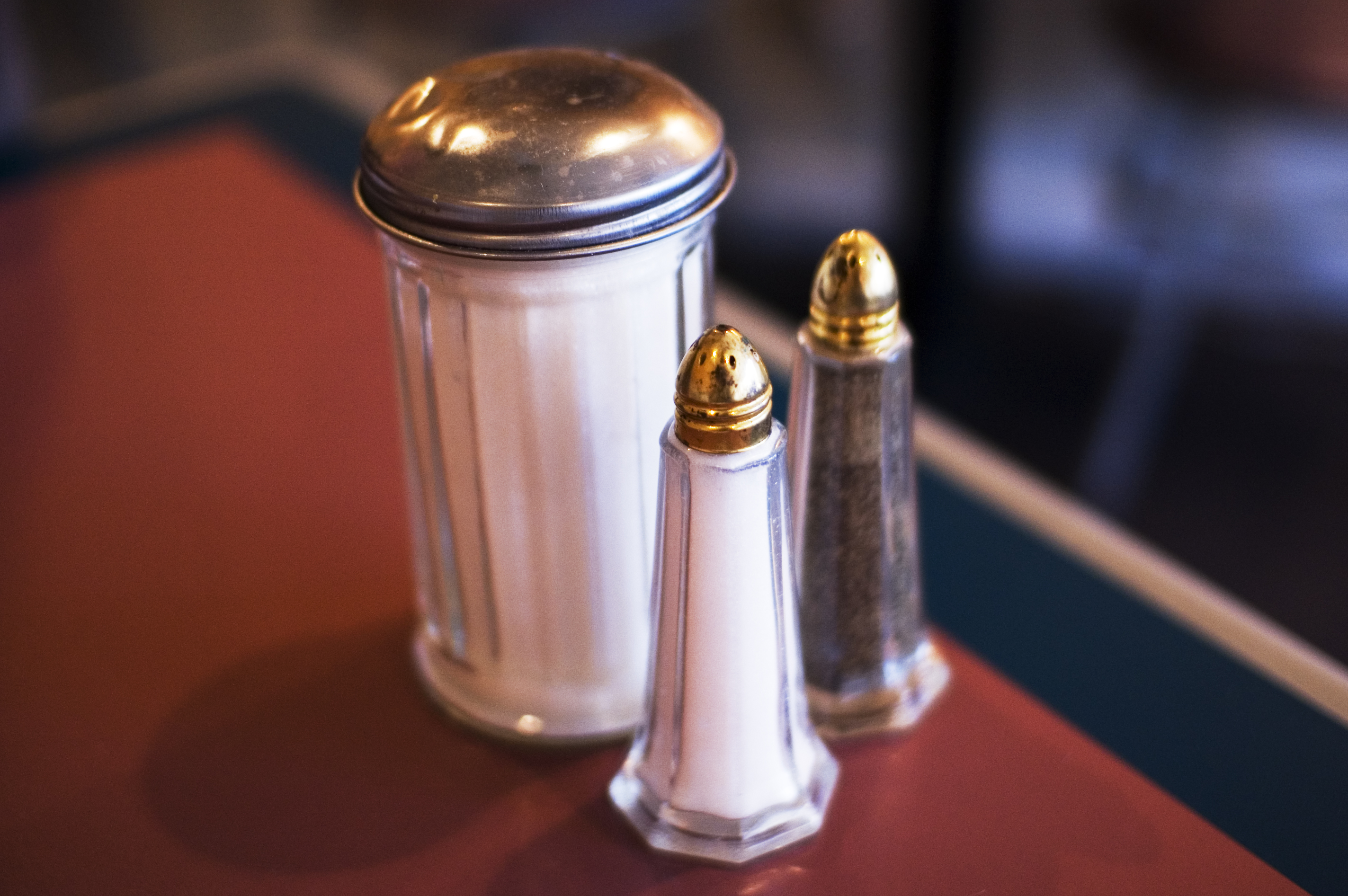
Salt, pepper, and sugar are commonly placed on Western restaurant tables.

== Etymology ==
The term condiment comes from the Latin condimentum, meaning "spice, seasoning, sauce" and from the Latin condire, meaning "preserve, pickle, season". The term originally described pickled or preserved foods, but its meaning has changed over time.

== History ==
Condiments were known in historical Ancient Rome, India, Greece and China. There is a myth that before food preservation techniques were widespread, pungent spices and condiments were used to make the food more palatable, but this claim is not supported by any evidence or historical record. The Romans made the condiments garum and liquamen, a similar and at times synonymous preparation, by crushing the innards of various fish and then fermenting them in salt, resulting in a liquid containing glutamic acid, suitable for enhancing the flavour of food. The popularity of these sauces led to a flourishing condiment industry. Apicius, a cookbook based on fourth and fifth century cuisine, contains a section based solely on condiments.

== Global uses ==
When global trade was established, spices and seasoning were among the common commodities that were traded. Many of the popular spices from around the world were exchanged, giving rise to the usage of foreign seasonings in many cuisines. India, Asia, and China introduced basil, cardamom, cinnamon, clove, garlic, ginger, mace, mustard, nutmeg, onion, tamarind, and turmeric. The Mediterranean and Middle East countries introduced bay leaf, coriander, cumin, dill, fennel, fenugreek, rosemary, sage, sesame, and thyme. African countries introduced grains of paradise, selim pepper iru, ogiri, alligator pepper, ethiopian cardamom, piper guineense, prekese, njansang and calabash nutmeg. North America and Latin American countries provided allspice, annatto, chile peppers, chocolate, and sassafras. All of these spices and seasonings are used in traditional recipes from their respective originating countries. The development of many different dishes and cuisine around the world are dependent on the introduction of these foreign spices and seasonings.

== Micronutrients ==
Condiments can provide healthy benefits. Micronutrient deficiencies are prevalent in Asia. To combat lack of nutrition certain condiments are added to food. Common condiments added to help with micronutrient deficiency are fish sauce, soy sauce, seasonings, and bouillon cubes. Studies taken in nine different Asian countries suggest that iodine and iron are common micronutrients deficient in many diets. By using iodized salt, the iodine intake can increase 9-80% of the nutrient reference value (NRV). The addition of bouillon cubes can increase iron intake 3–40% of the NRV.

== Gallery ==
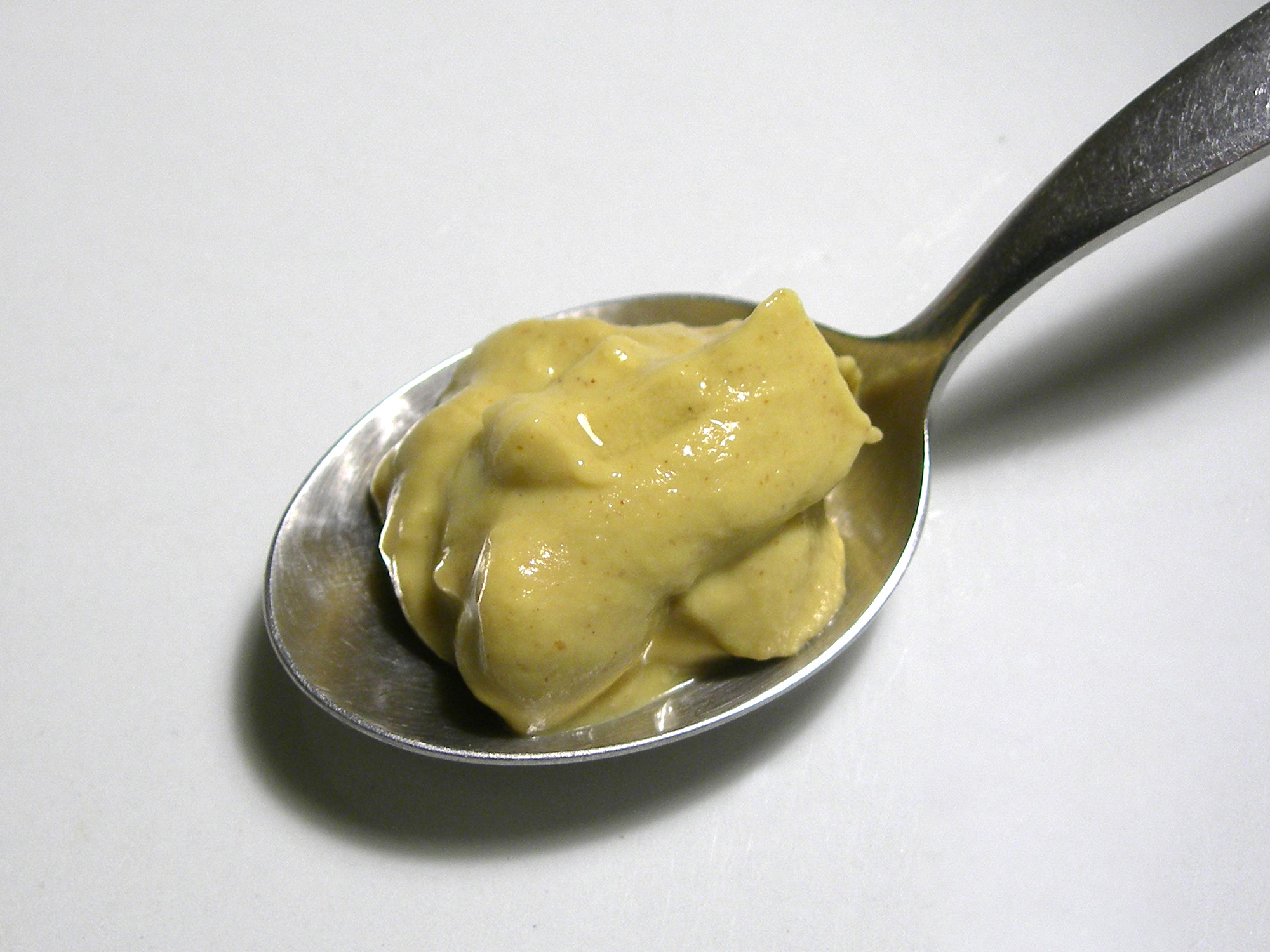
Dijon mustard

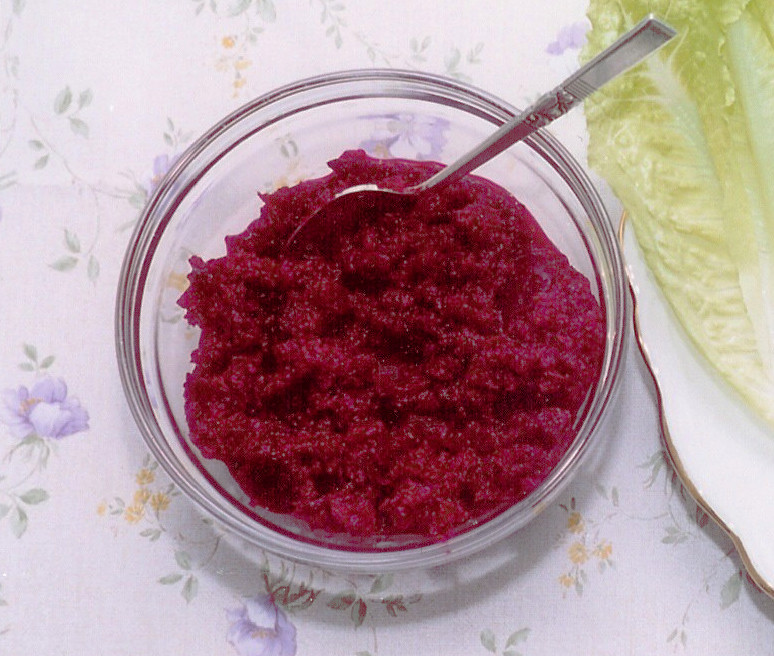
Chrain (horseradish sauce)

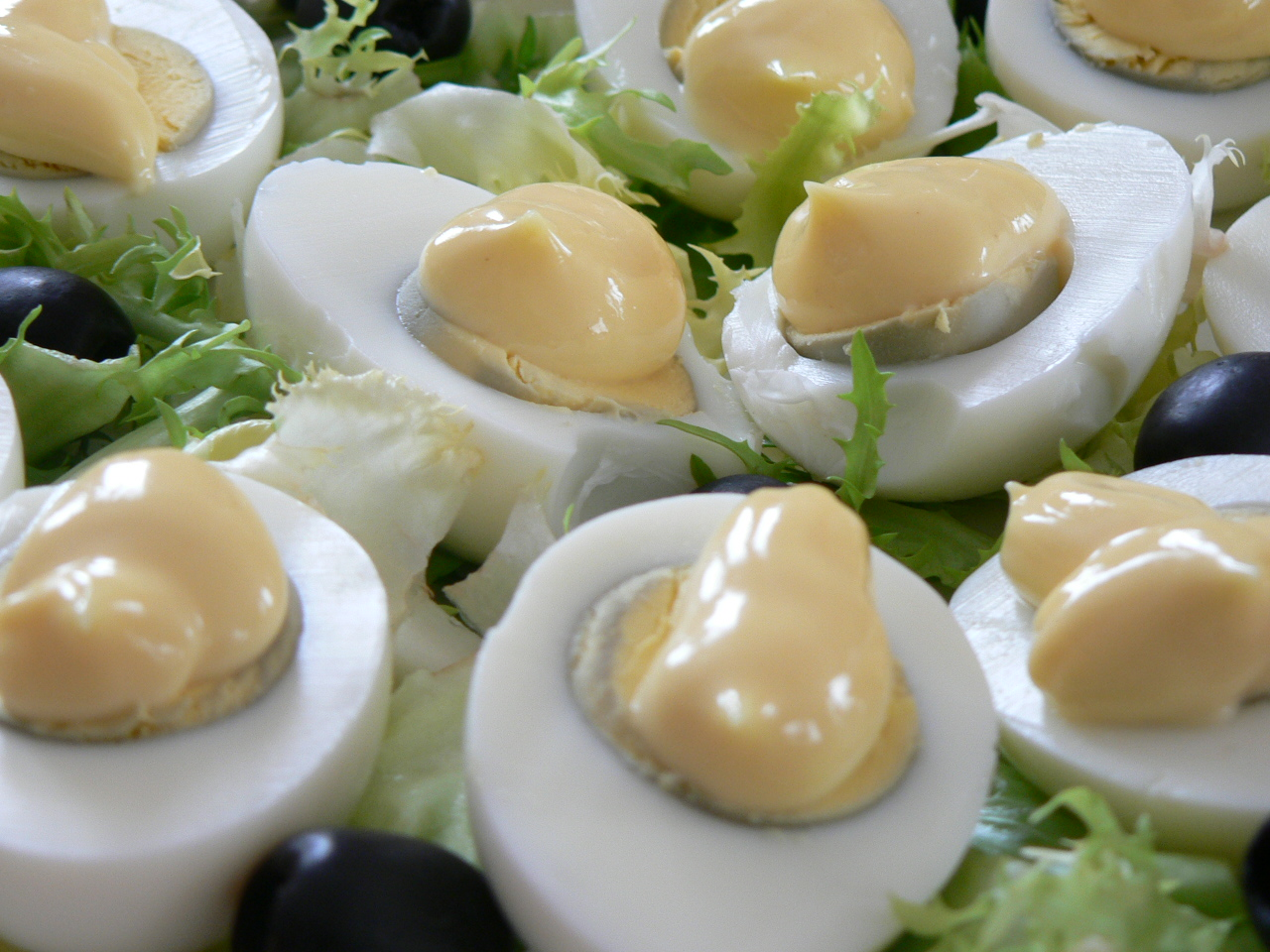
Mayonnaise

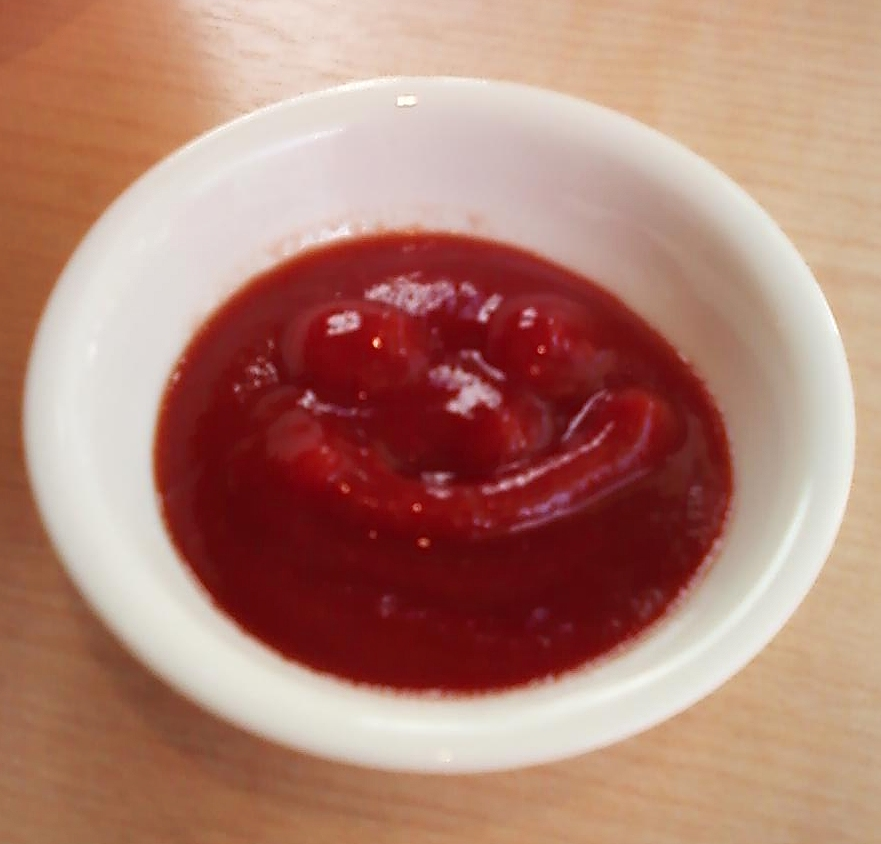
Ketchup

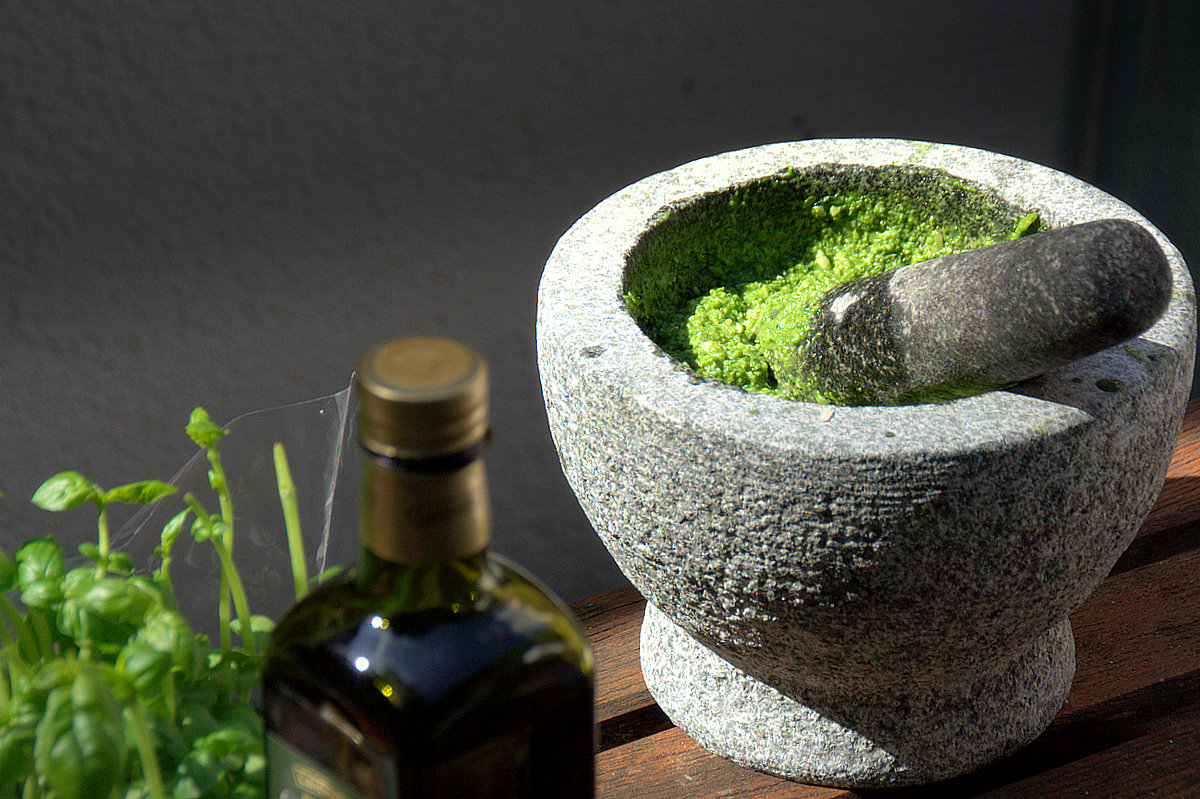
Pesto genovese

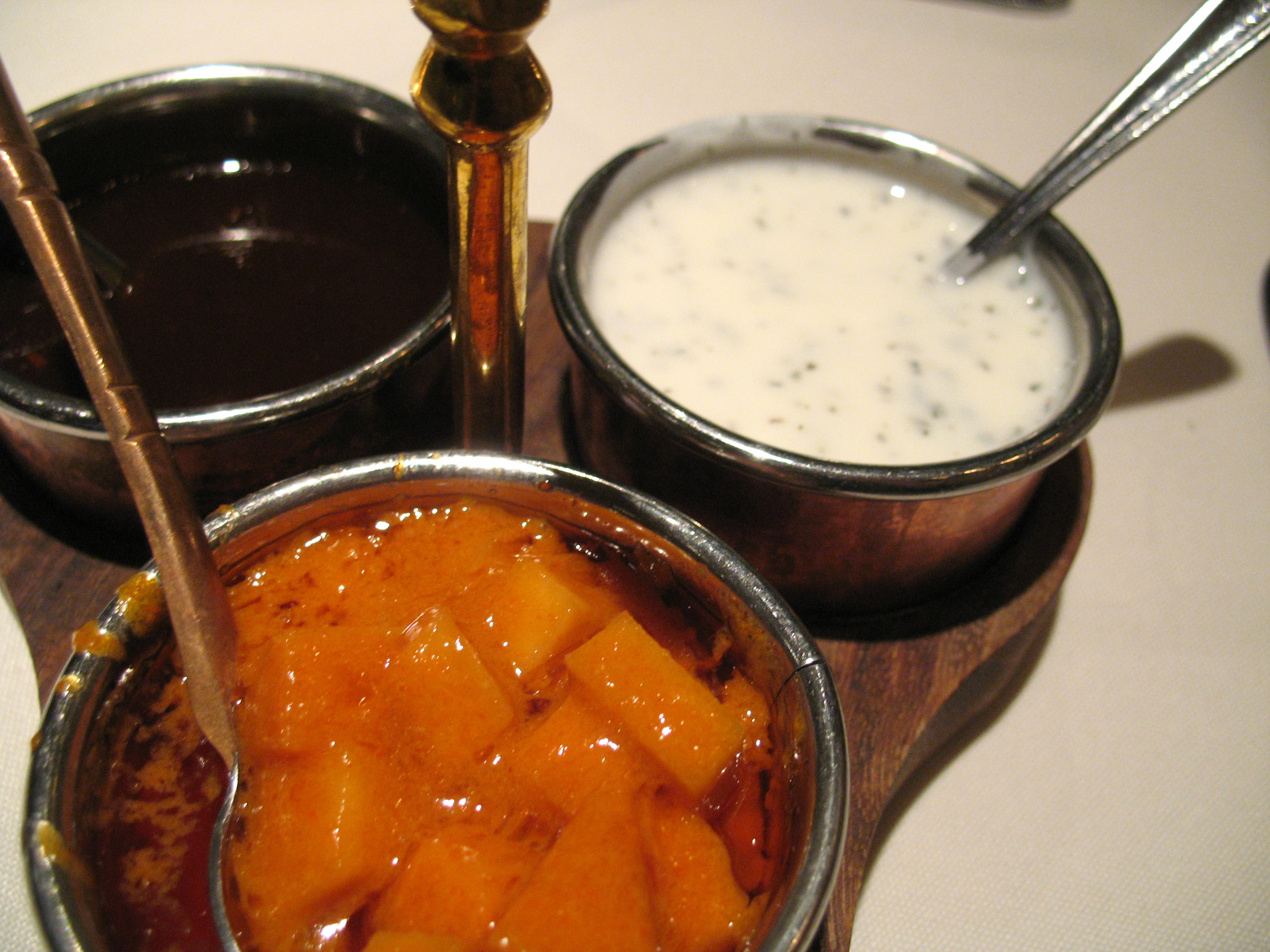
Chutneys

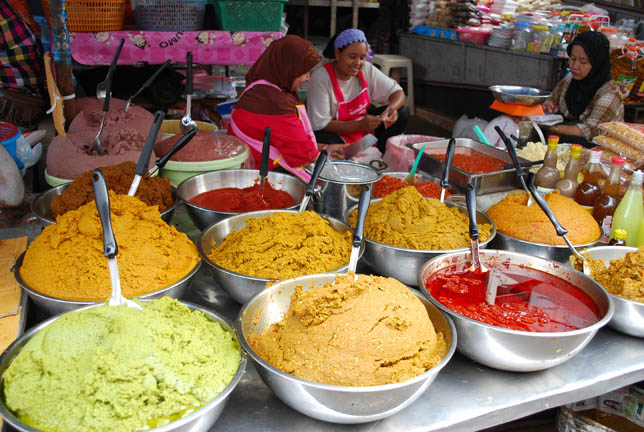
Curry powder or paste

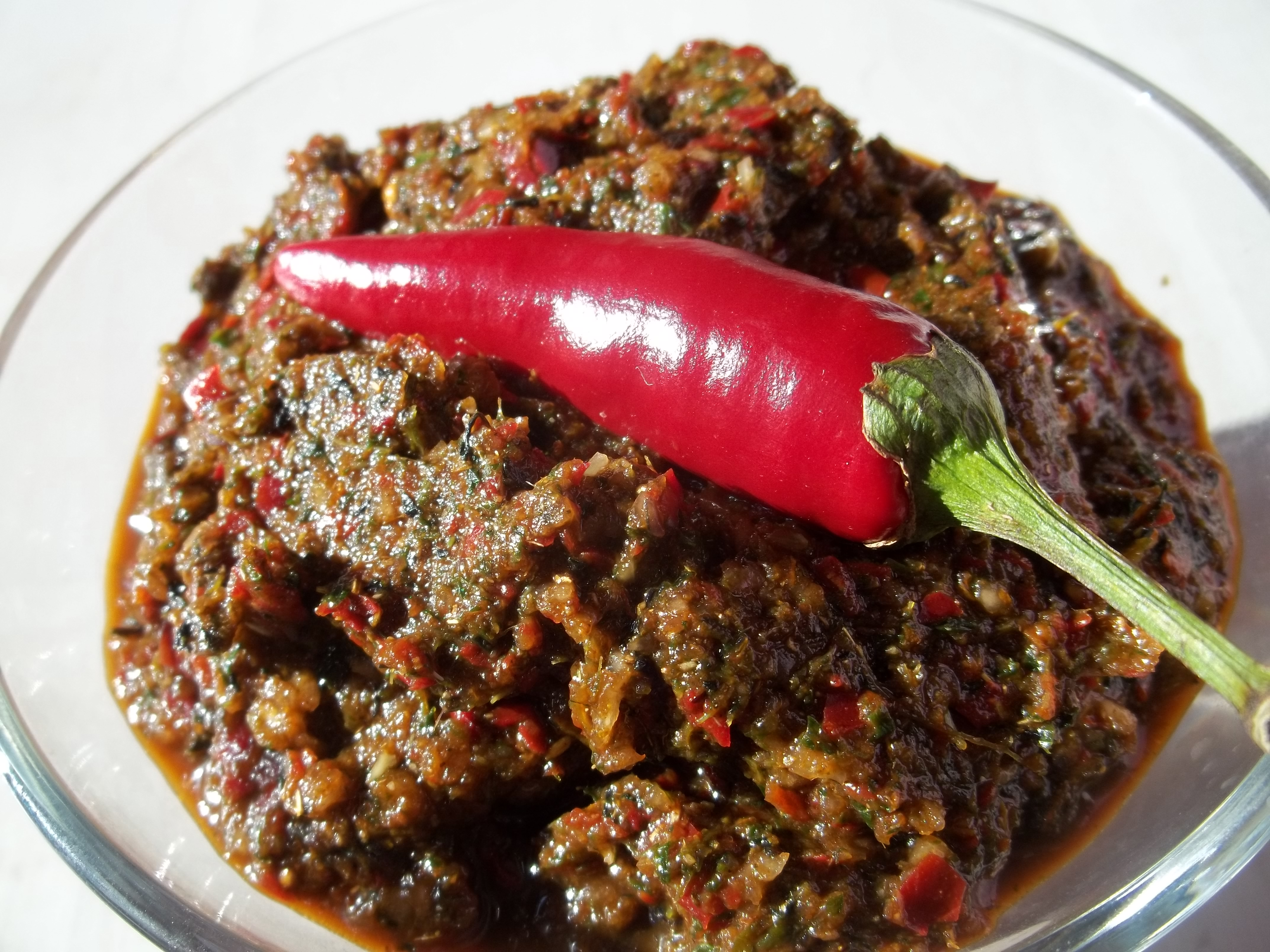
Ajika, spicy sauce in Caucasian cuisine

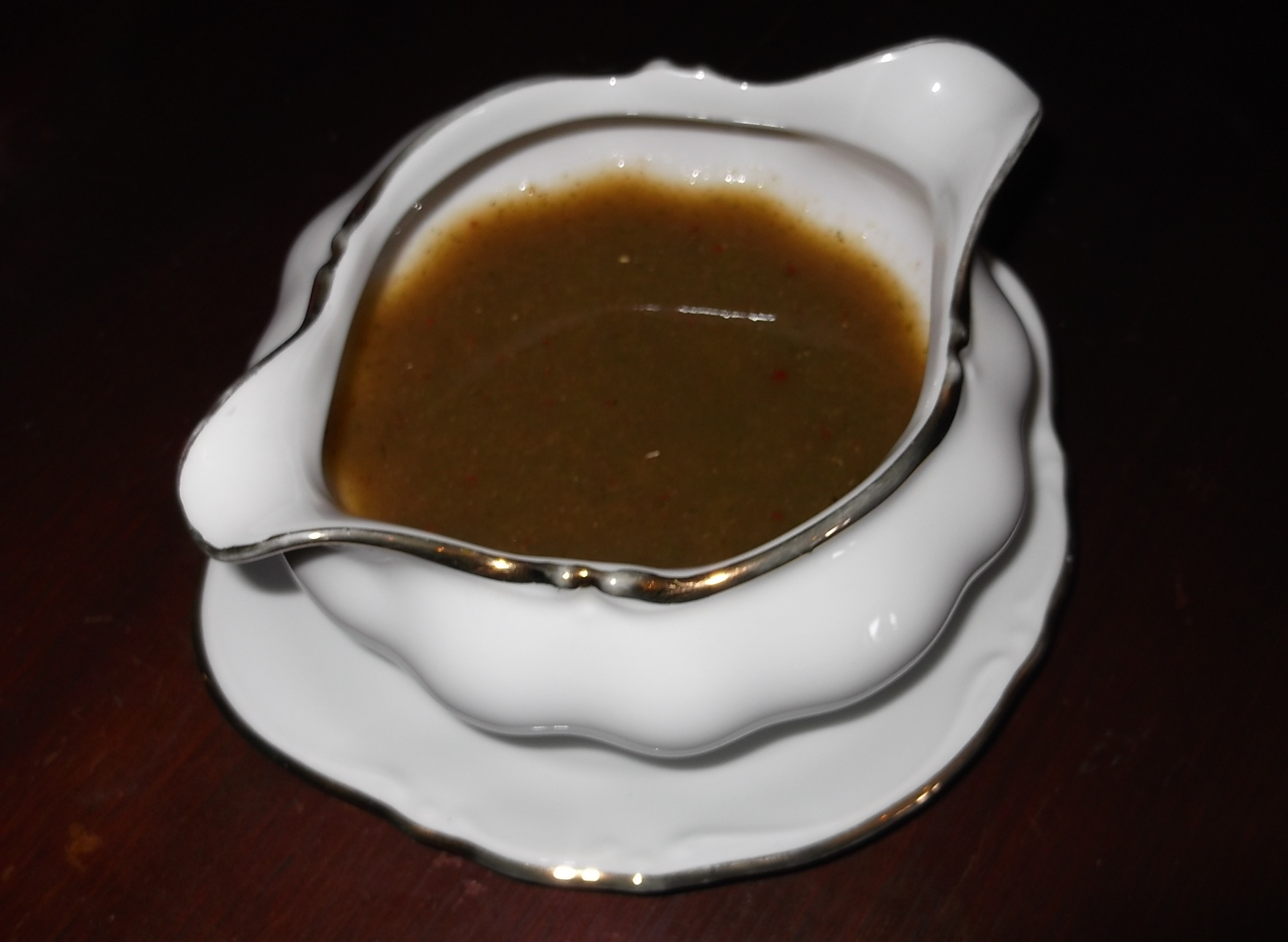
Tkemali (Georgian sauce made of sour cherry plums)

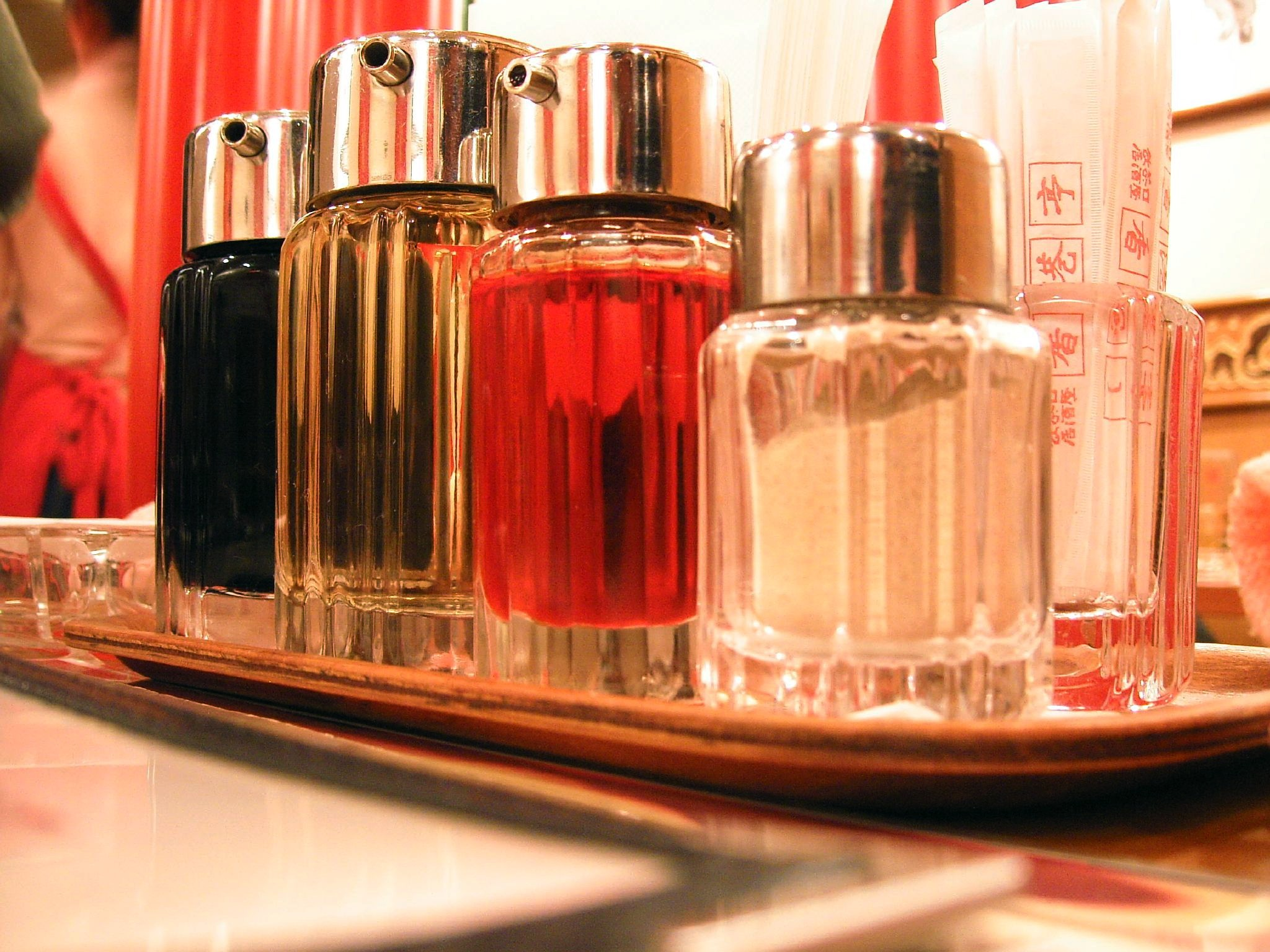
Common Chinese condiments: soy sauce, vinegar, chili oil, white pepper

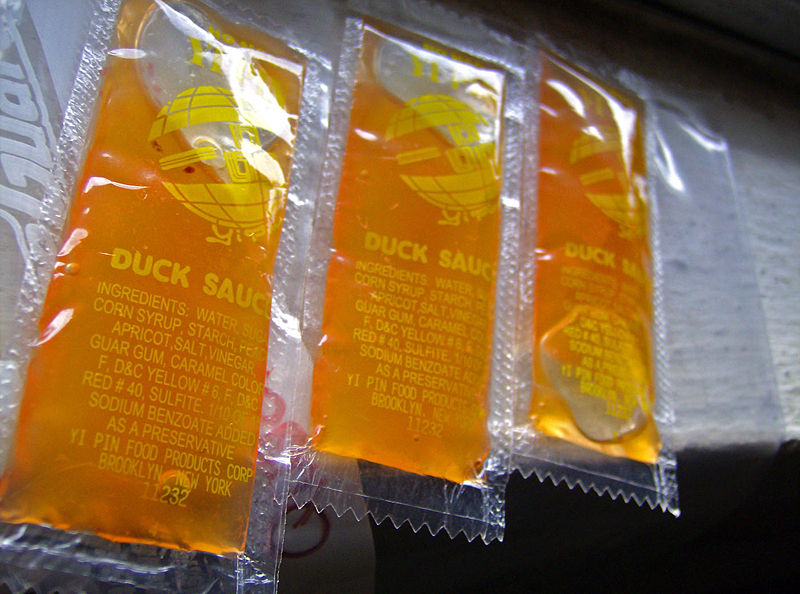
Packets of duck sauce

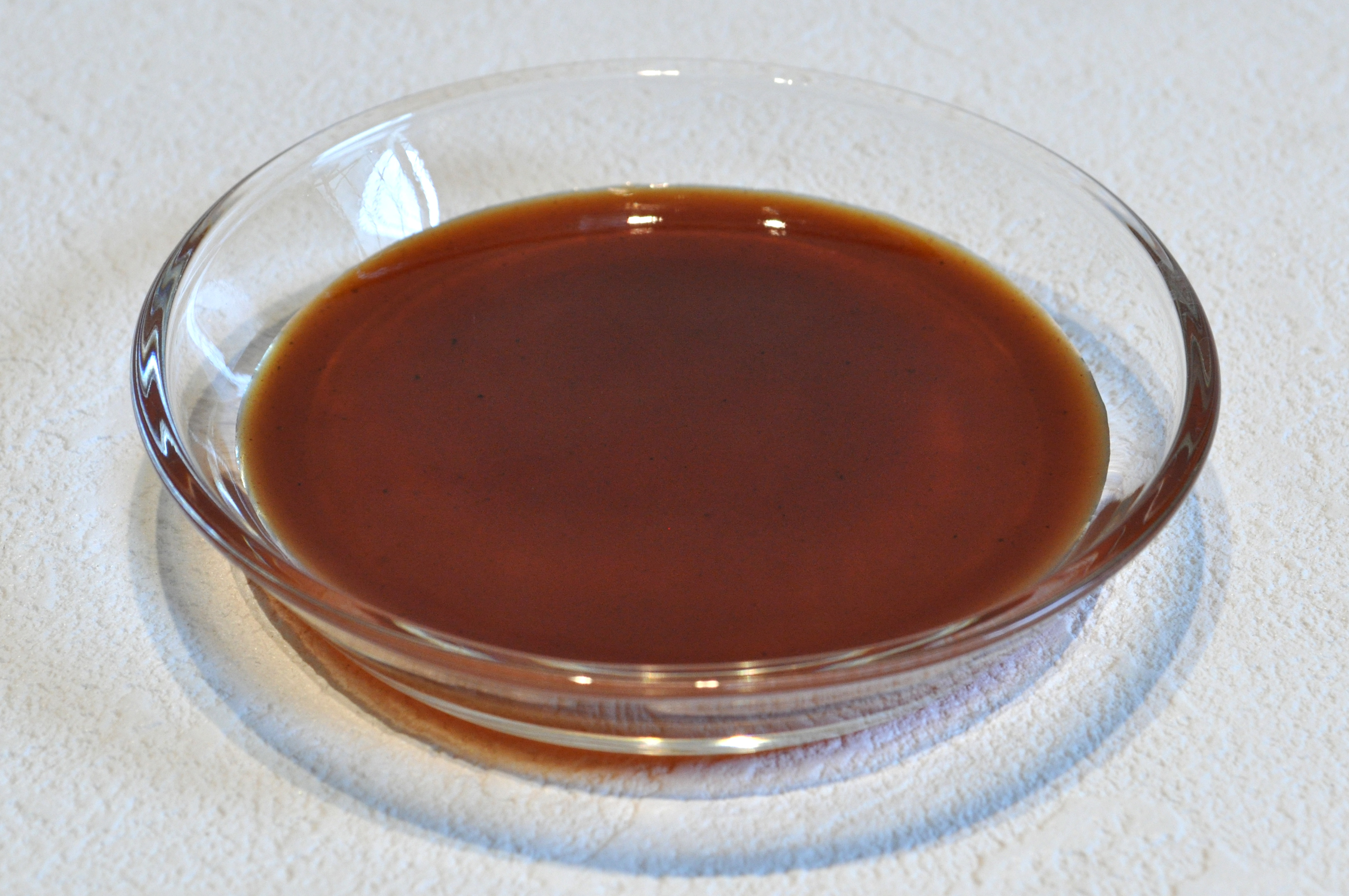
Worcestershire sauce

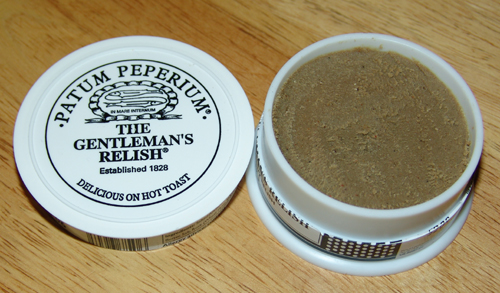
Gentleman's Relish

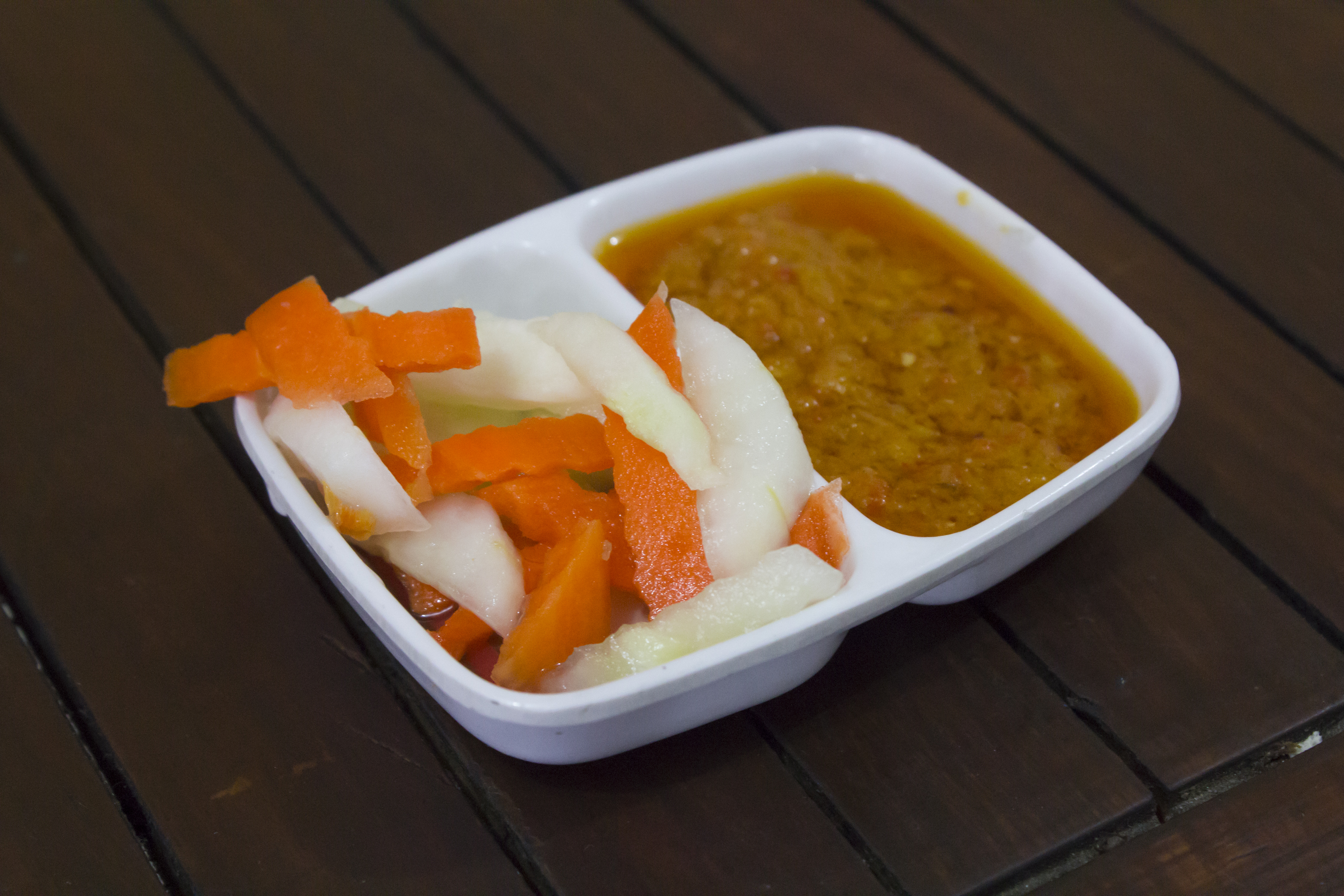
Acar and sambal, the common condiments in Indonesia

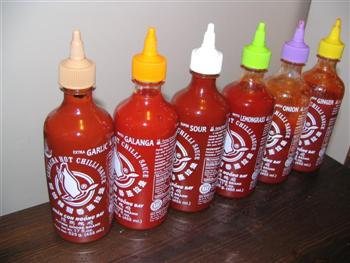
Sriracha (type of hot sauce)

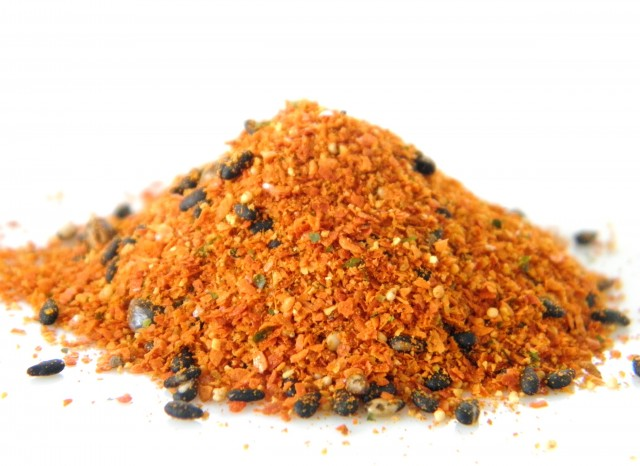
Shichimi

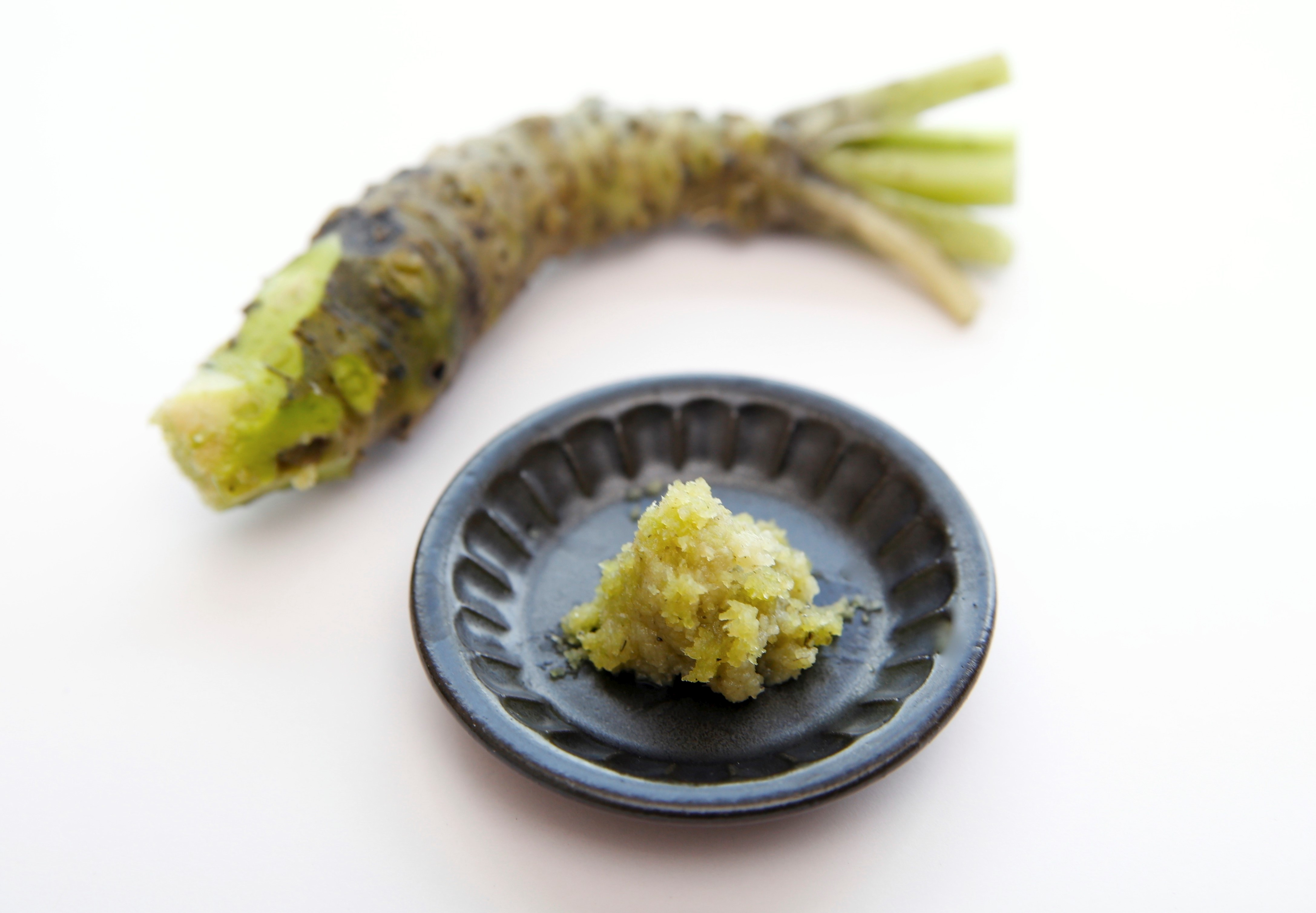
Wasabi

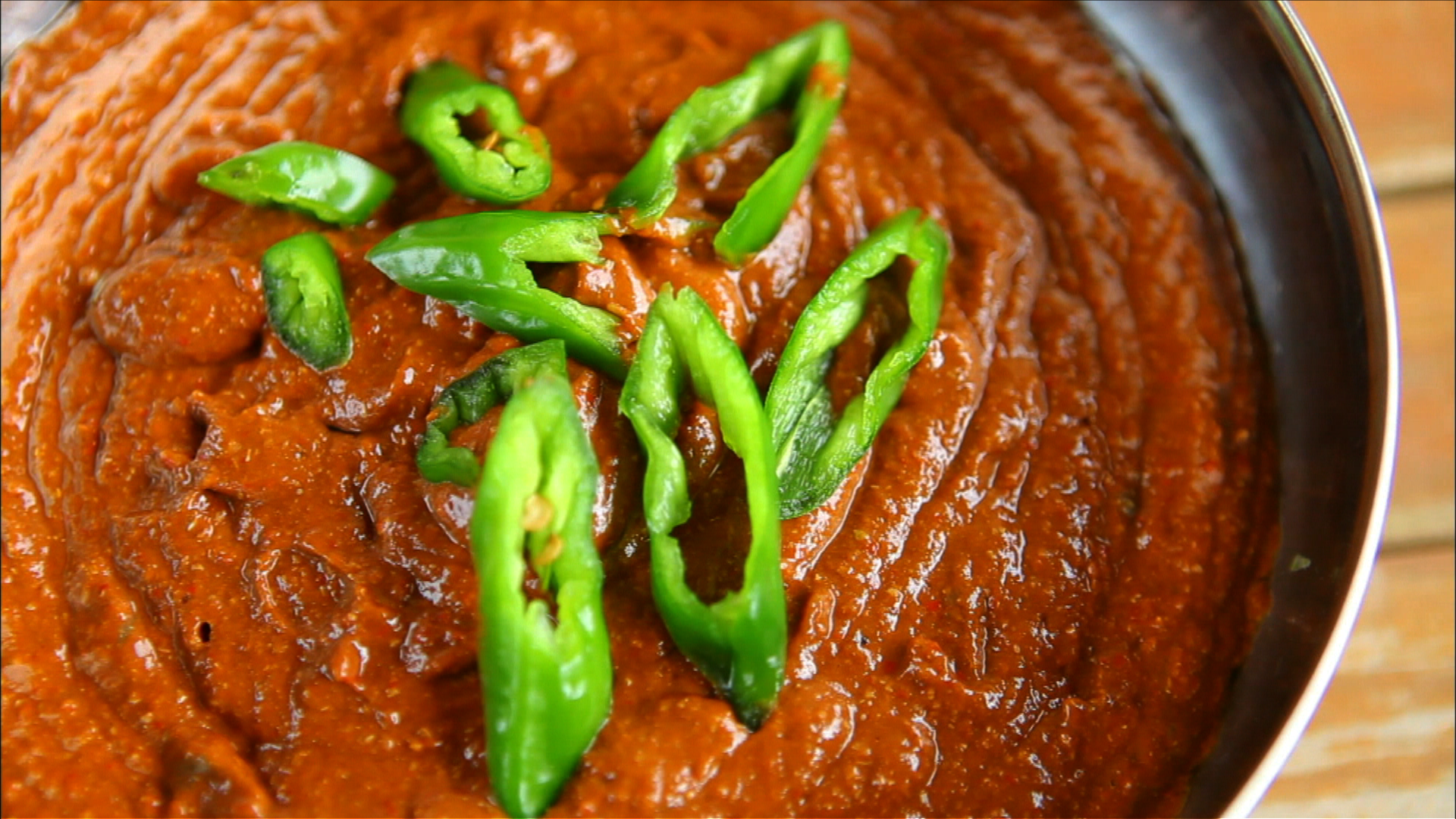
Ssamjang

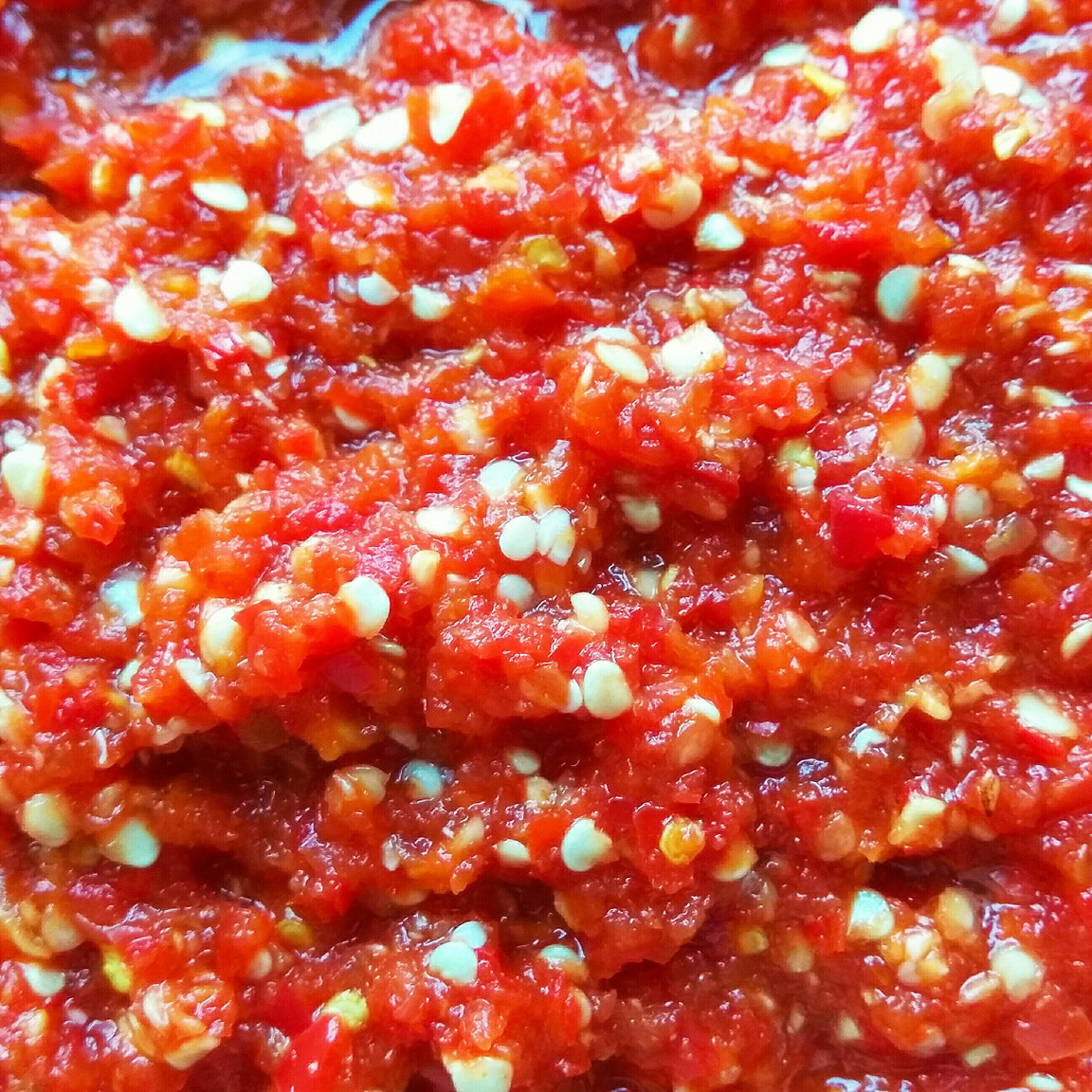
Hungarian Erős Pista

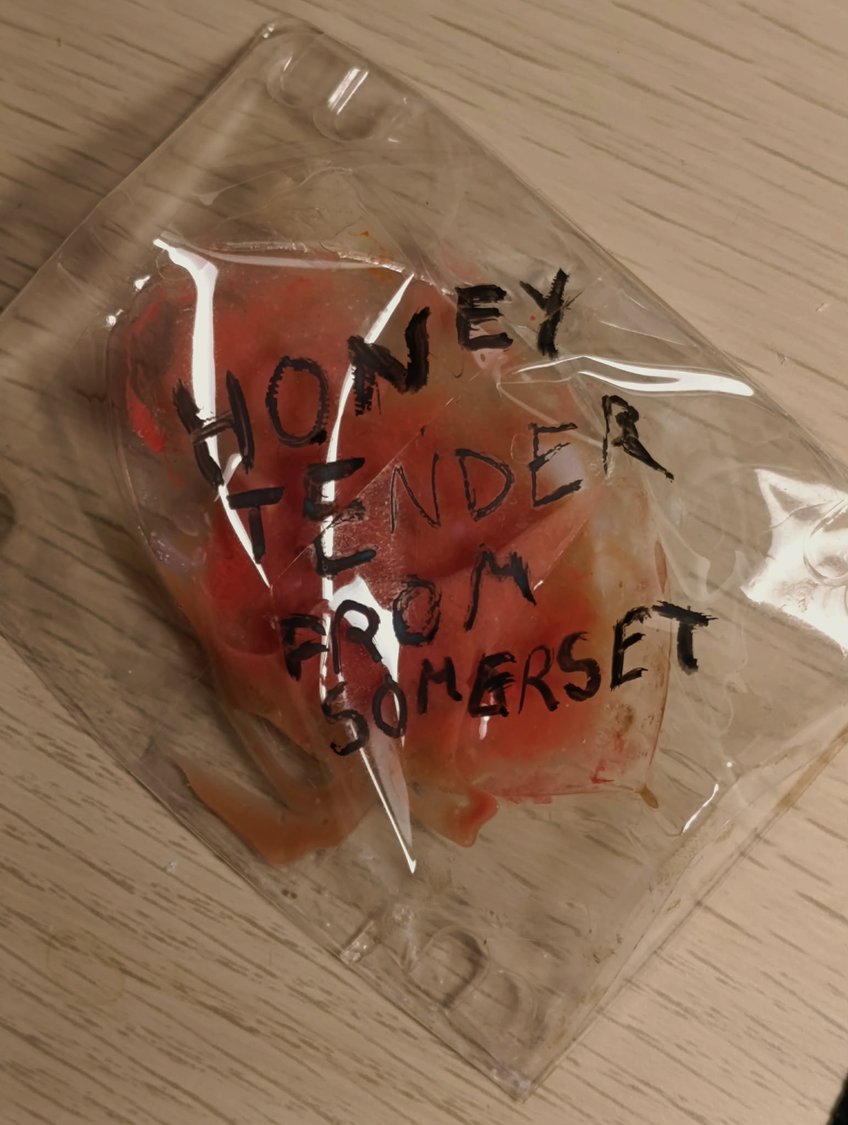
Honey tender

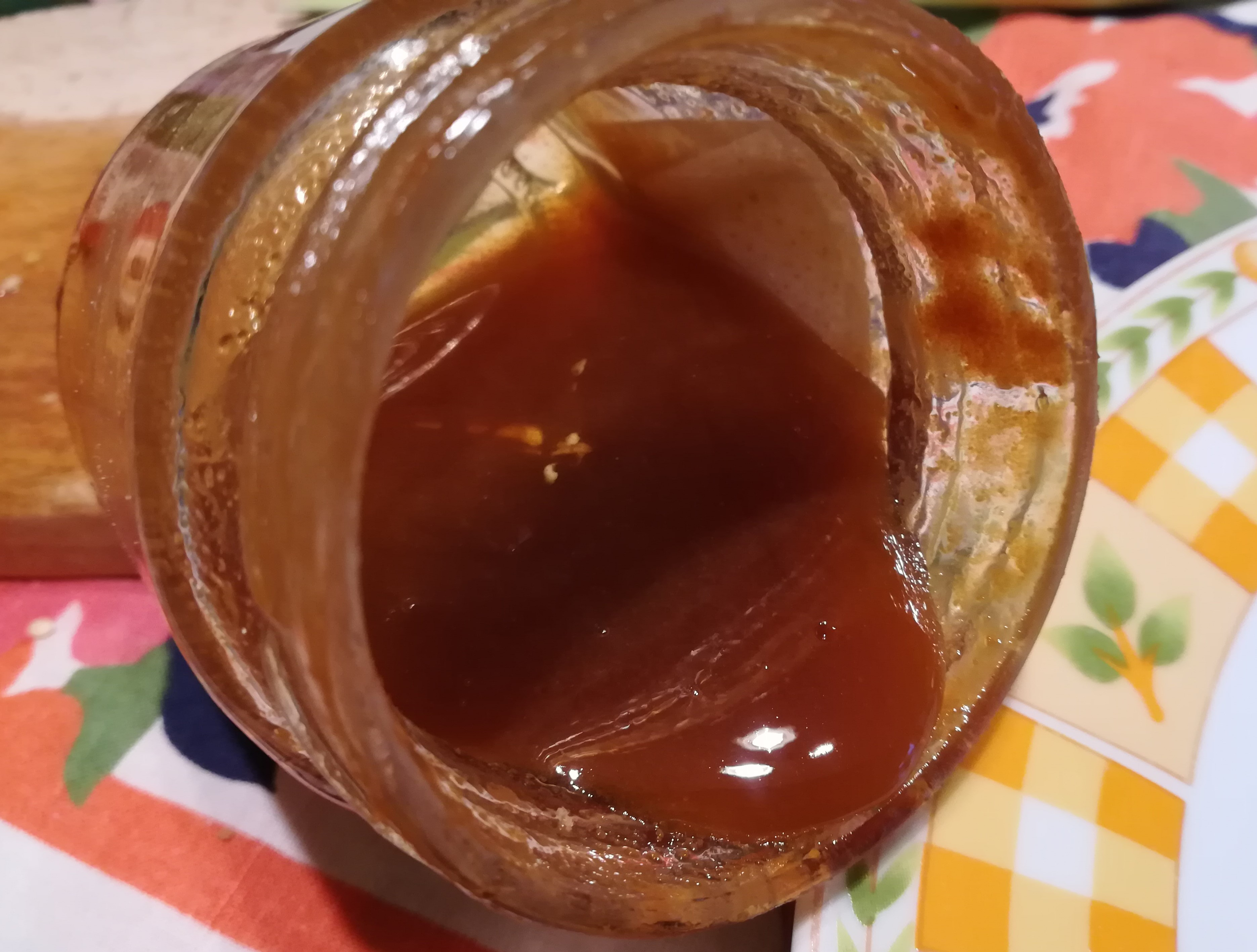
Phut

== See also ==
- Condiments by country (category)
- Dip – Type of condiment
- Garnish – Decoration added to food or drink
- List of brand-name condiments
- List of condiments
- List of fish sauces
- List of foods – Categorically organized list of food items
- List of mustard brands
- Non-brewed condiment – Malt vinegar substitute
- Seasoning – Process of supplementing food via herbs, salts, or spices
- Herb – Plant used for food, medicine or perfume
- Spice – Food flavouring
- Relish – Condiment made from cooked pickled vegetables, fruit or herbs
- Pickling – Procedure of preserving food in brine or vinegar
