= Iru (condiment) =

Fermented locust beans used as condiment in cooking in West Africa

Irú (Yoruba) or Daddawa (Hausa) or Eware (Edo) or Sumbala (Bambara) or Narghi (Fula) or Zwuaii (Tyap) is a type of fermented and processed locust beans (Parkia biglobosa) or soybean used as a condiment in cooking. It is similar to ogiri and douchi. It is popular throughout West African cuisine. It is used in cooking traditional soups like egusi soup, okro soup (ila), Ewedu soup, and ogbono soup.

== Iru production ==
Dry iru cakes

A video showing how to process Iru using Soya beans

The fabrication process involves boiling, cleaning and then packing away to ferment. This fermentation process gives it a pungent smell. Salt can be added to the finished product to facilitate storage life.

This condiment is traditionally sold in balls or patties that can be kept for several months at a time in the case of the best quality.

Yorubas make two types of Irú:

- Irú Wooro is used mostly in vegetable soups like Efo Riro, Egusi soup, Ofada sauce, Ayamashe, Buka stew, Obe ata, Ila Asepo, etc.
- Irú pẹ̀tẹ̀ is used in making ewedu and egusi soup.

During fermentation, the reducing sugar content increases, and the total free amino acid content initially decreases; in the end, however, there is a large increase in free amino acid content.

== Names and variations ==
Names and variants in several different languages of the region include:

- Manding languages: sunbala, sumbala, sungala, sumara Sumbala (or in French transcription soumbala) is a loan from Manding.
- Hausa: dawadawa, daddawa
- Pulaar/Pular: ojji
- Yoruba: iru
- Serer, Saafi, Wolof: netetou
- Krio: kainda
- Susu: Kenda
- Zarma: doso mari
- Dagbanli: Kpalgu
- Mooré: Colgo
- Konkomba language: tijun, tijon

== See also ==
- List of African dishes
