= South African cuisine =

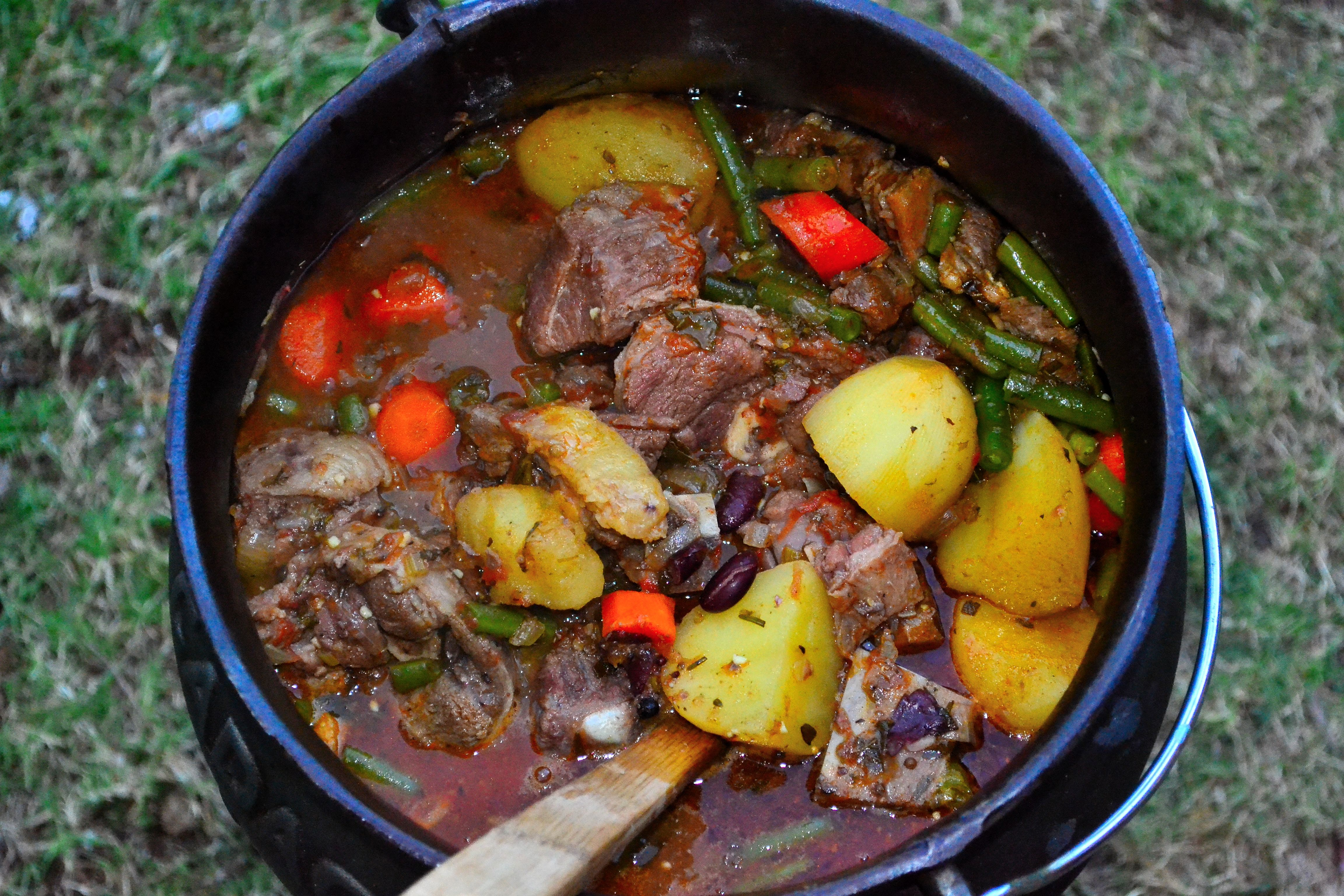
Potjiekos, literally translated to "small pot food", is a stew prepared outdoors in a traditional round, cast iron, three-legged pot. This one is being cooked on a fire, locally known as a braai.

South African cuisine draws from the culinary traditions of the various communities that inhabit the country. Among the indigenous peoples of South Africa, the Khoisan foraged over 300 species of edible food plants, such as the rooibos shrub legume, whose culinary value continues to influence South African cuisine. Subsequent encounters with Bantu pastoralists facilitated the emergence of cultivated crops and domestic cattle, which supplemented traditional Khoisan techniques of meat preservation. In addition, Bantu-speaking communities produced an extensive repertoire of ingredients and dishes, many of which are still consumed today in traditional settlements and urban entrepôts alike.

South African cuisine is heavily based on meat consumption. A widely observed culinary tradition is braai, a social event in which South Africans gather to cook meat over an open fire. A popular South African snack is biltong, an air dried, seasoned meat.

== History ==
The San peoples were hunter-gatherers, who mostly depended on foods like tortoises, crayfish, coconuts, and squash. Agriculture was introduced to South Africa by the Bantu peoples, who continue in the cultivation of grain, starch fruit and root tubers — in the manner of maize, squash, and sweet potatoes, following their introduction in the Columbian exchange, displacing the production of many Old World food crops. Mabele (red sorghum) and madumbe (cocoyam, taro, or arrowroot) also continue to be widely cultivated.

By the 17th century, Dutch and British foodways, introduced through European immigration, contributed to further culinary diffusion. The Cape Malay community founded a distinctive diasporic cuisine, derived largely from Southeast Asian culinary traditions, while Afrikaner voortrekkers further inland adapted Dutch, Khoisan, Cape Malay, and Bantu foodways to accommodate their peripatetic lifestyle. In addition, French Huguenot refugees, many of whom settled in Franschhoek, played an instrumental role in developing South Africa's viticultural industry.

During the period of British colonial rule, immigrants from Asia, many of whom arrived as indentured laborers in the 19th century, further enriched South Africa's culinary repertoire. In particular, Indian South Africans introduced a wealth of spices, seasonings, and dishes, historically associated with KwaZulu-Natal. However, Indian cuisine is now widely available across South Africa and consumed by all ethnic groups.

Disinvestments and sanctions imposed on South Africa during apartheid stifled the country's culinary output. At this time, shebeens, situated in urban townships, became very popular and often served as non-formal community centers, especially for black South Africans who maintained their cultural and culinary traditions. Following the end of apartheid, South African cuisine witnessed a renaissance, with diverse culinary options available in most of the country's major cities catering to tourists, expatriates, and residents. In addition, South African ingredients and dishes have attained greater visibility worldwide, owing to the burgeoning South African diaspora.

== National cookery ==
=== Beverages ===
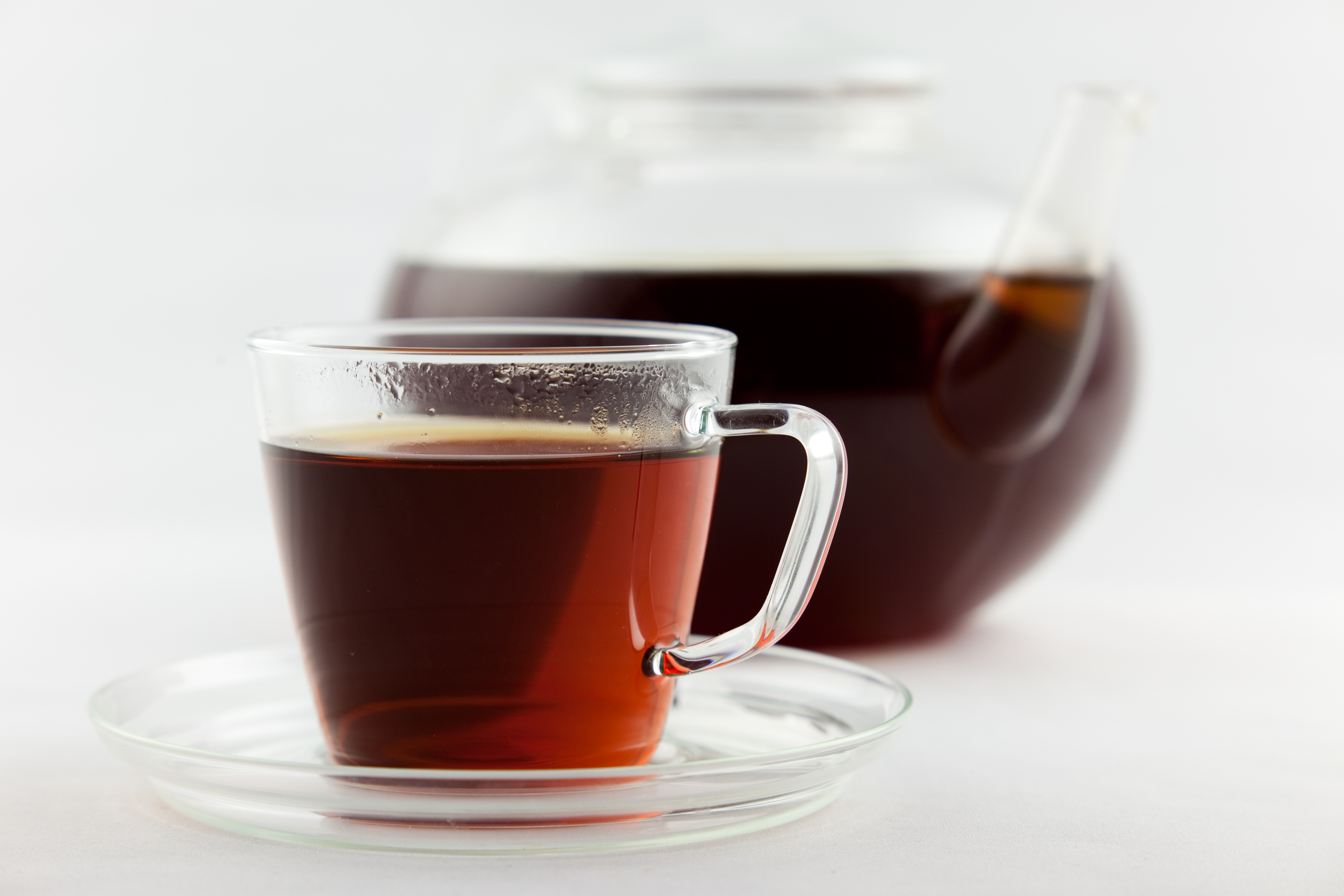
A cup of freshly prepared rooibos tea, native to South Africa

Beer has been an essential beverage in South Africa for hundreds of years, among indigenous peoples long before colonisation and the arrival of Europeans, who brought their own beer-drinking traditions. Traditional beer was brewed from local grains, especially sorghum. Beer was so prized that it became central to many ceremonies, such as betrothals and weddings, in which one family ceremoniously offered beer to the other.

Unlike European beer, South African traditional beer was unfiltered and cloudy, with low alcohol content. Around the turn of the 1900s, as white-owned industry began studying malnutrition among urban workers, it was discovered that traditional beer provided crucial vitamins that were sometimes unavailable in the grain-heavy traditional diet and even less available in urban industrial slums.

As South Africa's mines developed and black South Africans began to urbanise, women also moved to the city. They started brewing beer for the predominantly male labour force—a labour force that was mostly single or had left their wives in the rural areas under the migrant labour system. That tradition of urban women making beer for the labour force persists in South Africa to the extent that informal bars and taverns (shebeens) are typically owned by women (shebeen queens).

Today, most urban dwellers purchase beer from industrial breweries that produce beer similar to that sold in Europe and America. In contrast, rural residents and recent city immigrants still enjoy the cloudy, unfiltered traditional beer.

Compared with an American or Western European diet, milk and milk products are very prominent in the traditional Black South African diet. As cows were considered highly desirable domestic animals in precolonial societies, milk was abundant. In the absence of refrigeration, various kinds of soured milk, somewhat like yogurt, were a dietary mainstay. A visitor to any African village in the 1800s would have been offered a large calabash of cool fermented milk as a greeting.

Because milk cows allowed women to wean their children early and become fertile more quickly, local cultures had numerous sayings linking cattle, milk, and population growth, such as the Sotho-Tswana saying, "cattle beget children."

Today, in the dairy section of South African supermarkets, one will find a variety of milks, sour milk, sour cream, and other modern versions of traditional milk products.

== Indigenous cookery ==
In the precolonial period, indigenous cuisine was characterised by the use of a wide range of foods, including fruits, nuts, bulbs, leaves, and other products gathered from wild plants, as well as the hunting of wild game. The introduction of domestic cattle and grain crops by Bantu speakers who arrived in the southern regions from north-east Africa since 200 AD, and the spread of cattle keeping to Khoisan groups, enabled the production of products and the availability of fresh meat on demand.

The pre-precolonial period consisted primarily of cooked grains, especially sorghum and millet, fermented milk (somewhat like yogurt), and roasted or stewed meat. At some point, maize replaced sorghum as the primary grain, and there is some dispute as to whether maize, a Central American crop, arrived with European settlers (notably the Portuguese) or spread through Africa before white settlements via Africans returning from the Americas during the era of the slave trade.

People also kept sheep and goats, and communities often organised large-scale hunts for abundant game, but beef was considered the most important and highest-status meat. The ribs of any cattle that were slaughtered in many communities were so prized that they were offered to the chief of the village.

In many ways, the daily diet of South African families can be traced to the indigenous foods eaten by their ancestors. A typical meal in a Bantu-speaking South African household consists of a stiff, fluffy porridge of maize meal (called pap, and very similar to American grits) with a flavorful stewed meat gravy. Traditional rural families (and many urban ones) often ferment their pap for a few days—especially when it is sorghum rather than maize—which gives it a tangy flavour. The Sotho-Tswana call this fermented pap, ting.

Vegetables used are often pumpkin varieties indigenous to South Africa, although many people now eat pumpkins that originated in other countries. Rice and beans are also very popular, although they are not indigenous. Another typical vegetable dish, which arrived in South Africa with its many Irish immigrants, but which has been adopted by South Africans, is shredded cabbage and white potatoes cooked with butter.

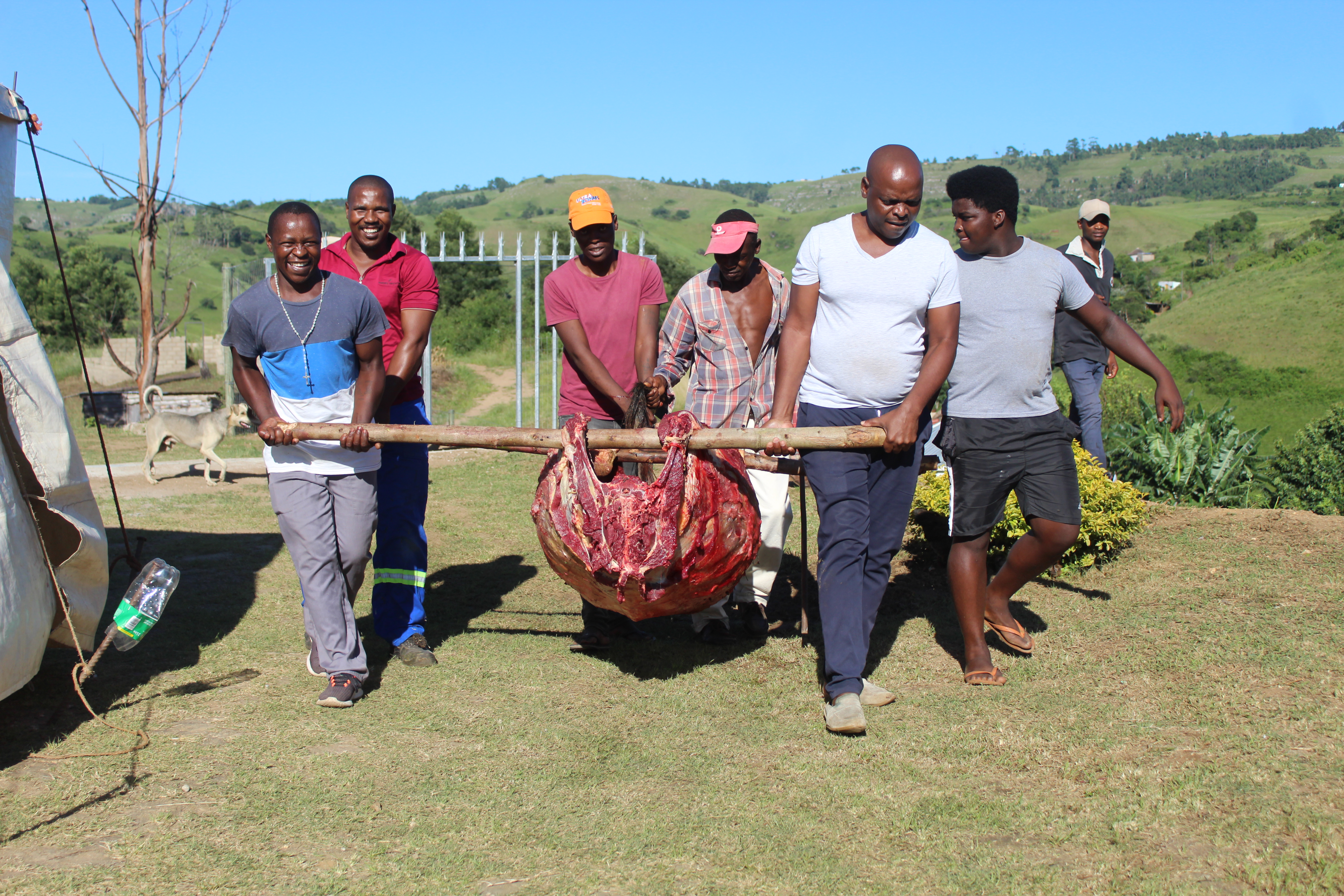
Men preparing the meat for a traditional ceremony

For many South Africans, meat is central to any meal. The Khoisan ate roasted meat and dried it for later use. The influence of their diet is reflected in the shared Southern African love of barbecue (generally referred to in South Africa by its Afrikaans name, a braai) and biltong (dried, preserved meat). As in the past, when men kept cattle as their prized possession in the rural areas, South Africans have a preference for beef.

Today, South Africans enjoy not only beef but also mutton, goat, chicken, and other meats as the centerpiece of a meal. On weekends, many South African families have a braai, and the meal usually consists of pap en vleis, which is maize meal and grilled meat. Eating meat even has a ritual significance in both traditional and modern South African culture.

In Bantu culture, for weddings, initiations, the arrival of family members after a long trip, and other special occasions, families purchase a live animal, slaughter it at home, and then prepare a large meal for the community or neighbourhood. Participants often say that spilling the blood of the animal on the ground pleases the ancestors who invisibly gather around the carcass. On holiday weekends, entrepreneurs set up pens of live animals along township main roads—primarily sheep and goats—for families to purchase, slaughter, cook, and eat. Because beef is the most prized meat for weddings, affluent families often buy a live steer for slaughter at home.

== European and Asian originated cookery ==
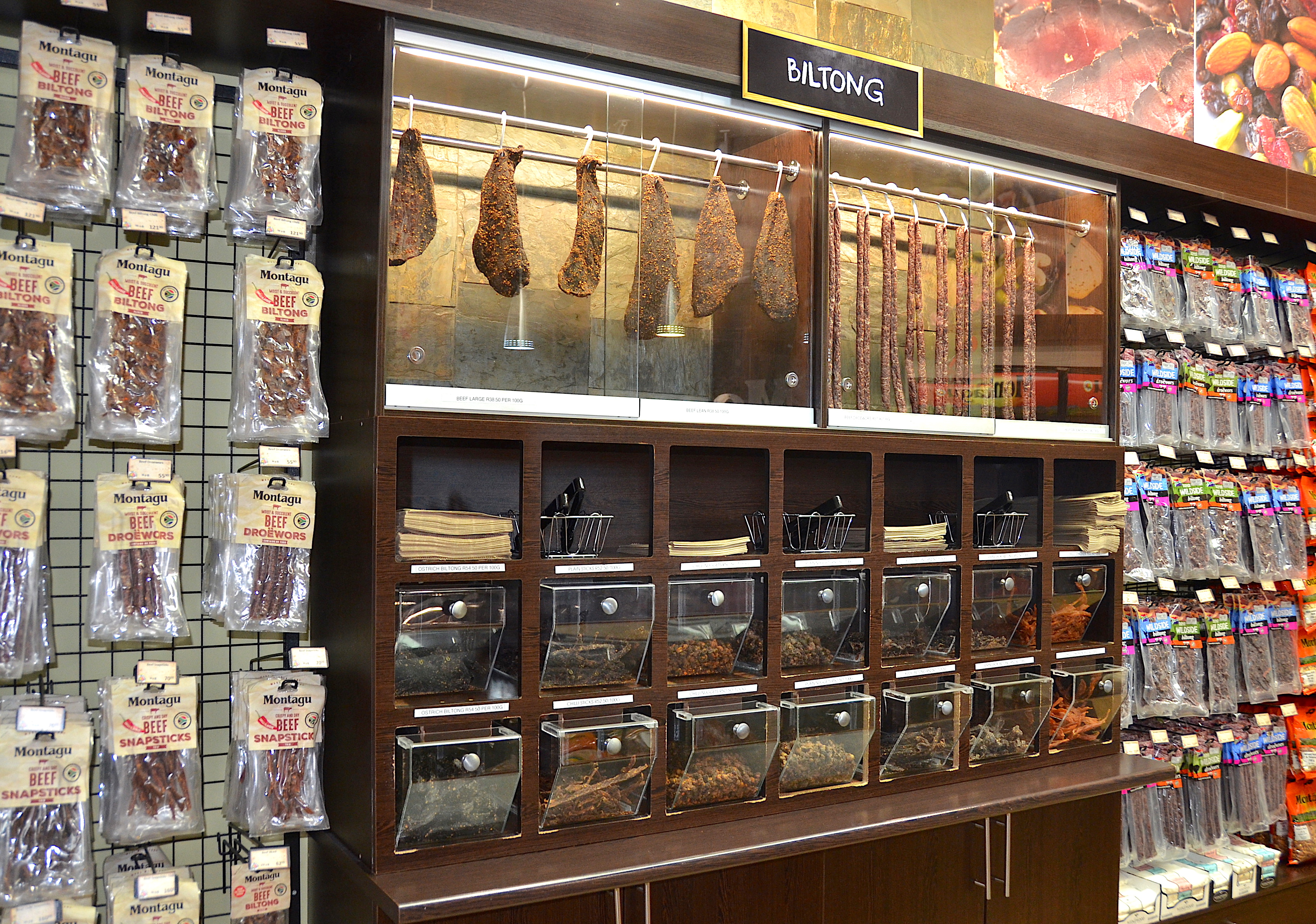
Biltong and droëwors on sale

During the 17th century, new foods such as biltong, droëwors, and rusks evolved locally out of necessity.

=== British cookery ===
South Africa was a colony of the British Empire and thus has strong influences from the United Kingdom. As British people settled in South Africa, they brought their cuisine, which influenced South African cuisine.

Sunday roast is as popular in South Africa as Australia, Canada, and New Zealand where there are influences from the UK. In South Africa, Yorkshire pudding is replaced by gravy sauce and rice.

Fish and chips are also popular in South Africa. Fish and chip shops employ dynamic selling methods, such as street vendors or vans. Typically fried fish are hakes and snoeks.

Meat pies and other savoury pies are readily available at most grocery stores and many petrol stations. Popular variants include sausage roll, Cornish pasty, and pepper steak pie.

=== Cape Dutch and Cape Malay cookery ===
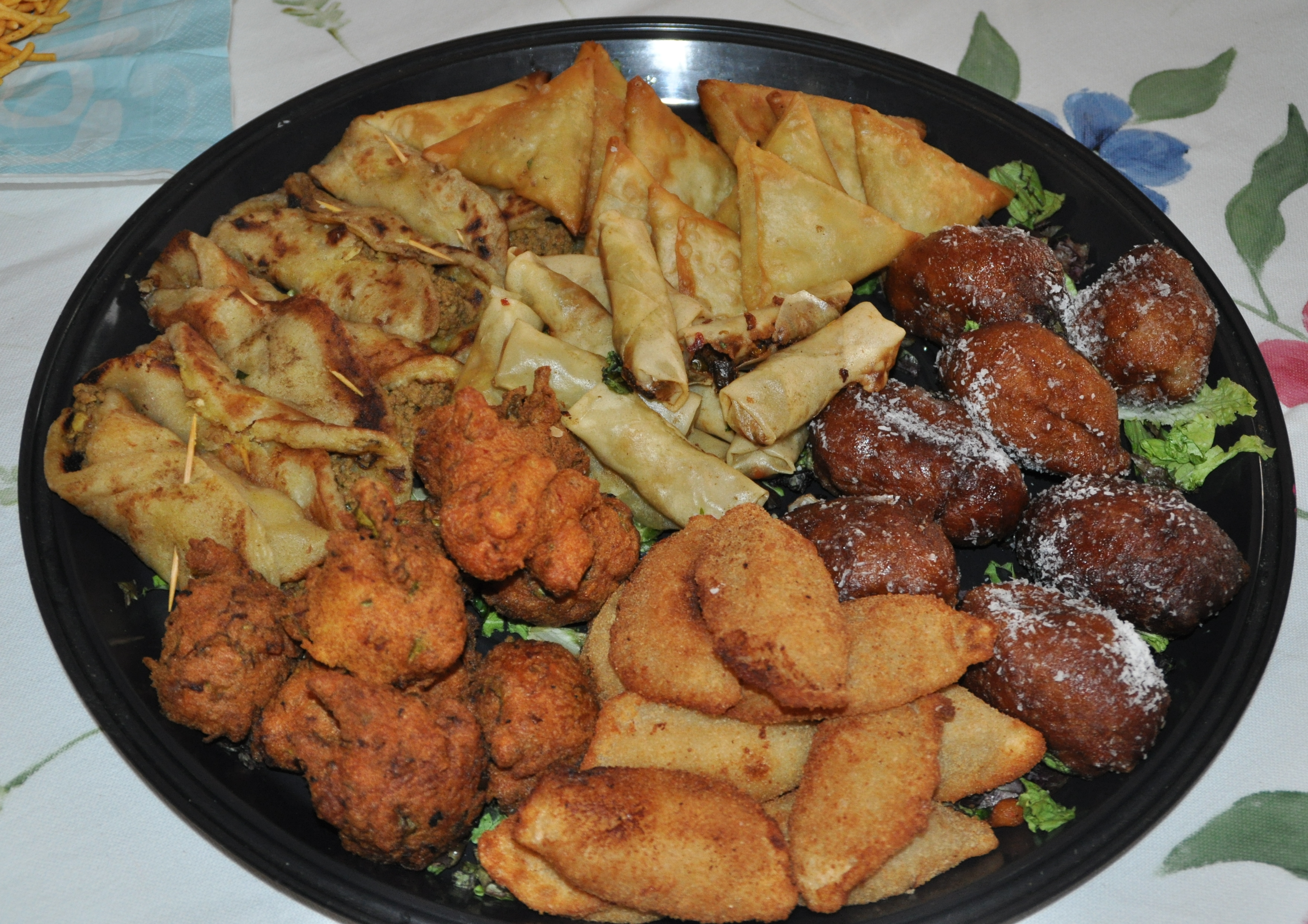
A Cape Malay dish served in Cape Town

A very distinctive regional style of South African cooking is often referred to as "Cape Dutch". This cuisine is characterised mainly by the usage of spices such as nutmeg, allspice, and chili peppers. The Cape Dutch cookery style owes at least as much to the cookery of the enslaved people brought by the Dutch East India Company to the Cape from Bengal, Java and Malaysia as it does to the European styles of cookery imported by settlers from the Netherlands, and this is reflected in the use of eastern spices and the names given to many of these dishes.

The Cape Malay influence has brought spicy curries, sambals, pickled fish, and a variety of fish stews.

Bobotie is a South African dish of Cape Malay origin. It consists of spiced minced meat baked with an egg-based topping. Of the many dishes eaten every day in South Africa, bobotie is perhaps closest to being the national dish, because it is not commonly found in any other country. The recipe originates from the Dutch East India Company colonies in Batavia, with the name derived from the Indonesian bobotok. It is also seasoned with curry powder, imparting a slight tang. It is often served with sambal, a hint of its origins from the Malay Archipelago.

South African yellow rice, a sweet dish made with turmeric, raisins, cinnamon and sugar, also has its origins in Cape Malay cookery, and is often referred to as Cape Malay yellow rice.

=== French cookery ===
French Huguenot refugees brought wines as well as their traditional recipes from France.

=== Indian cookery ===
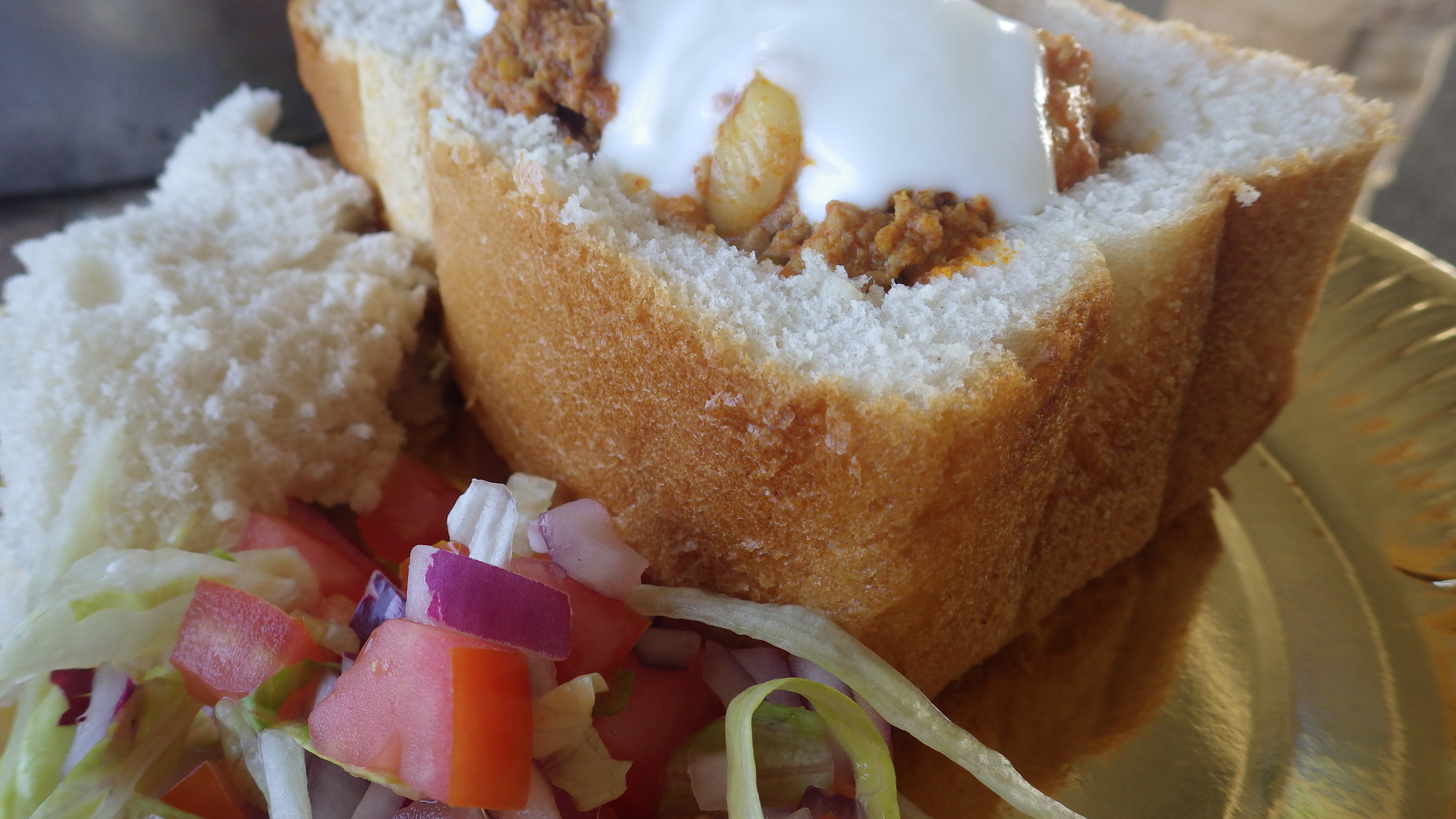
Bunny chow and salad, a meal that originated in the Indian South African community.

Curried dishes are popular in South Africa among people of all ethnic origins; many curried dishes came to the country with the thousands of Indian indentured labourers brought there in the nineteenth century. South African Indian cuisine has contributed to South African cooking with a wide variety of dishes and culinary practices, including curries, sweets, chutneys, fried snacks such as samoosas, and other savoury foods.

Bunny chow, a dish from Durban ("the largest 'Indian' city outside of India"), consisting of a hollowed-out loaf of bread filled with curry, has been adapted into mainstream South African cuisine. In the townships surrounding Pretoria, the capital, and Johannesburg, this sandwich is often referred to as a sphatlho or kota.

== Restaurants and outlets ==
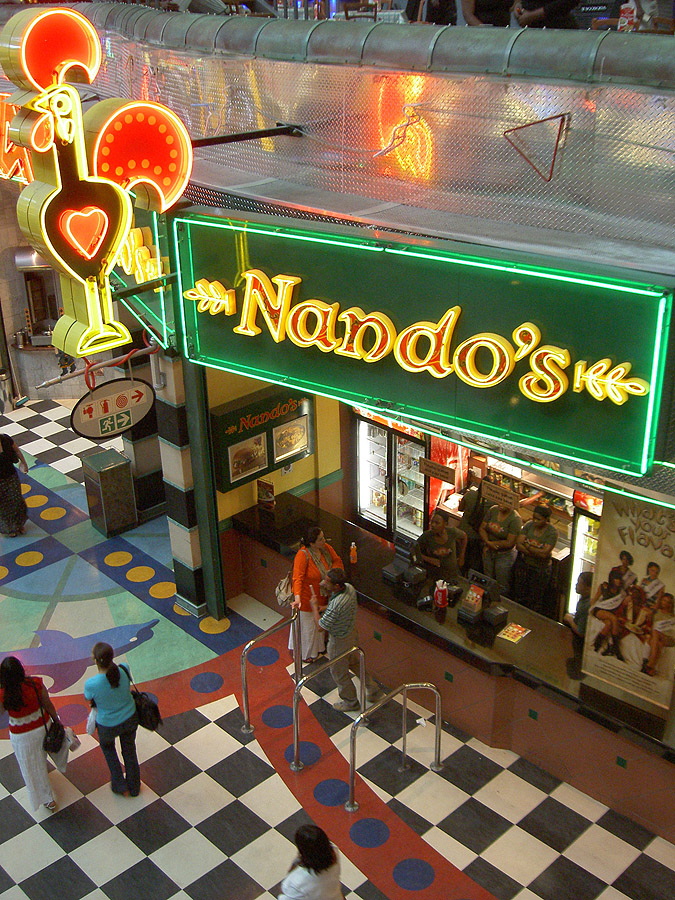
Nando's restaurant in South Africa

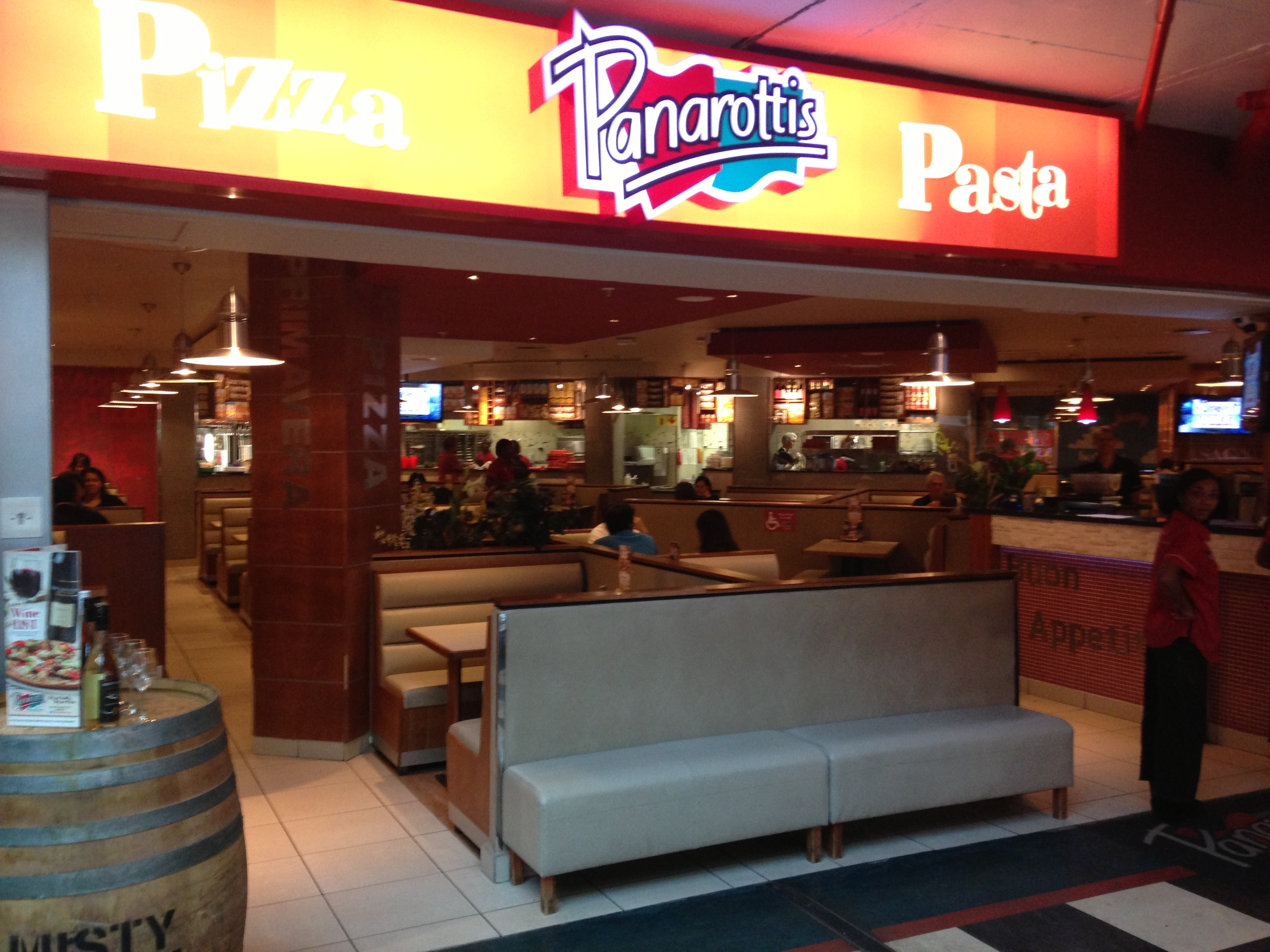
Panarotti's, a pizza restaurant originating in South Africa

South Africa can be characterized by a significant "eating out" culture. While some restaurants specialise in traditional South African dishes or modern interpretations thereof, restaurants featuring other cuisines such as Moroccan, Chinese, West African, Congolese, and Japanese can be found in all of the major cities and many of the larger towns. There are also many home-grown chain restaurants, such as Spur and Dulce Café.

There is also a proliferation of fast-food restaurants in South Africa. While some international players such as Kentucky Fried Chicken and McDonald's are active in the country, they face stiff competition from local chains such as Nando's, Galito's, Steers, Chicken Licken, Barcelos, Fat Cake City and King Pie. Many restaurant chains originating in South Africa have also expanded successfully beyond the country's borders.

== Typical South African foods and dishes ==
=== Savoury ===
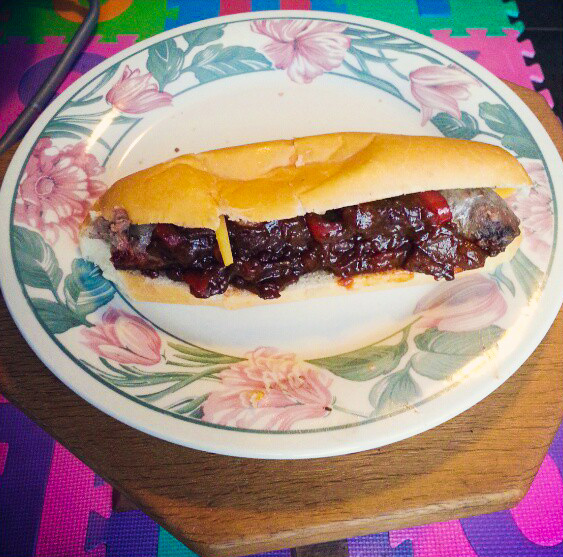
Boerewors roll

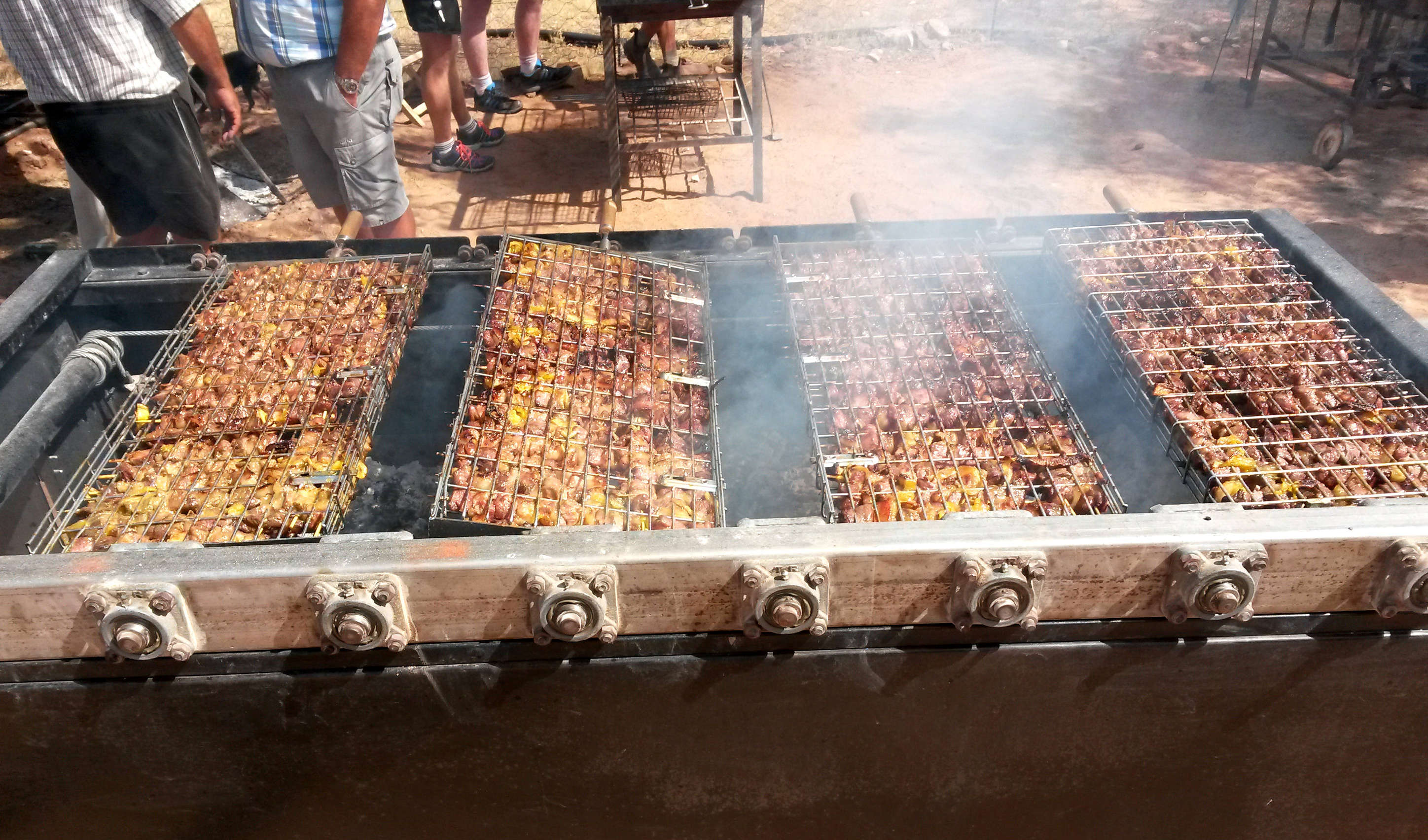
A large braai in process

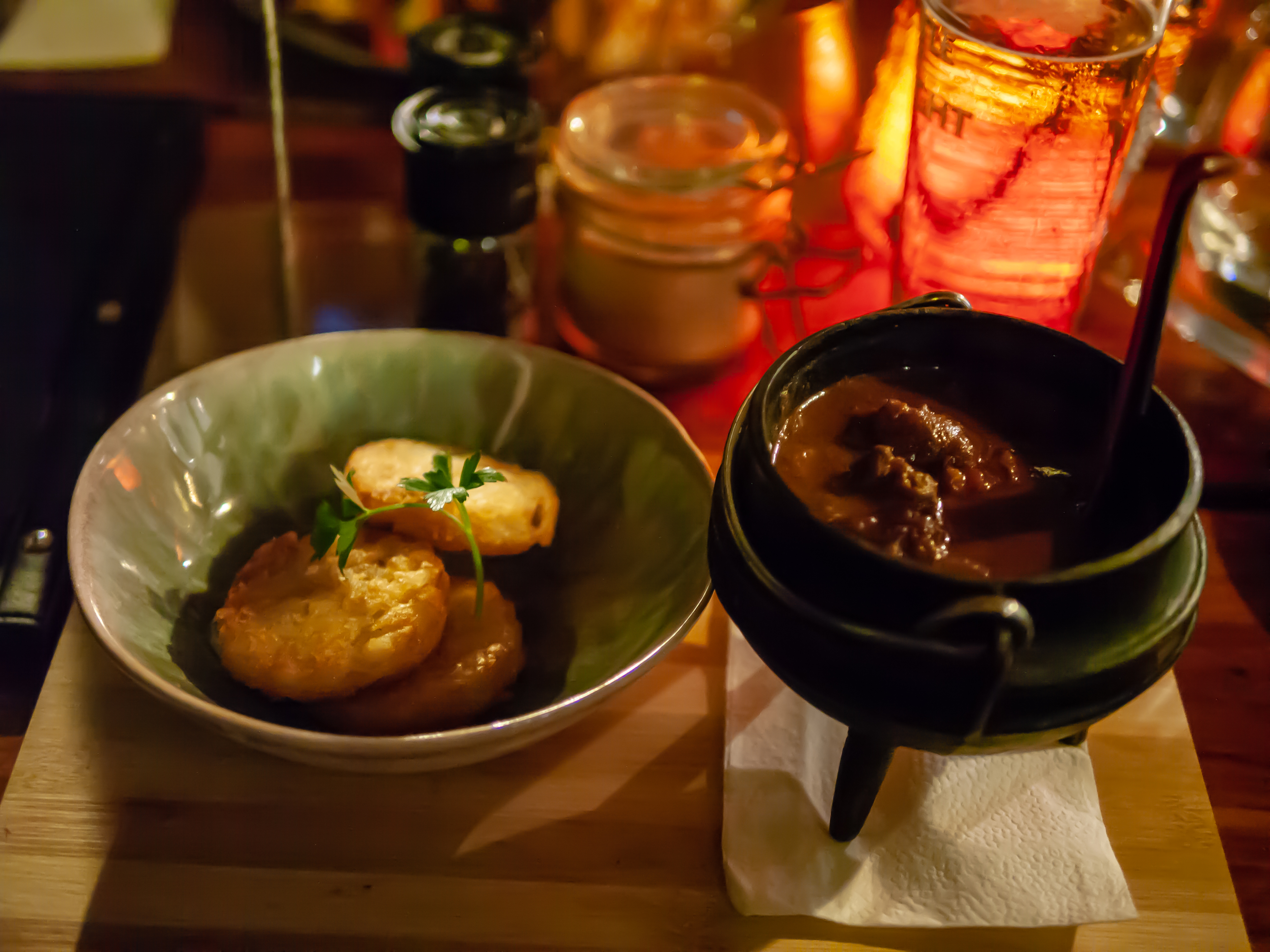
Freshly prepared springbok goulash

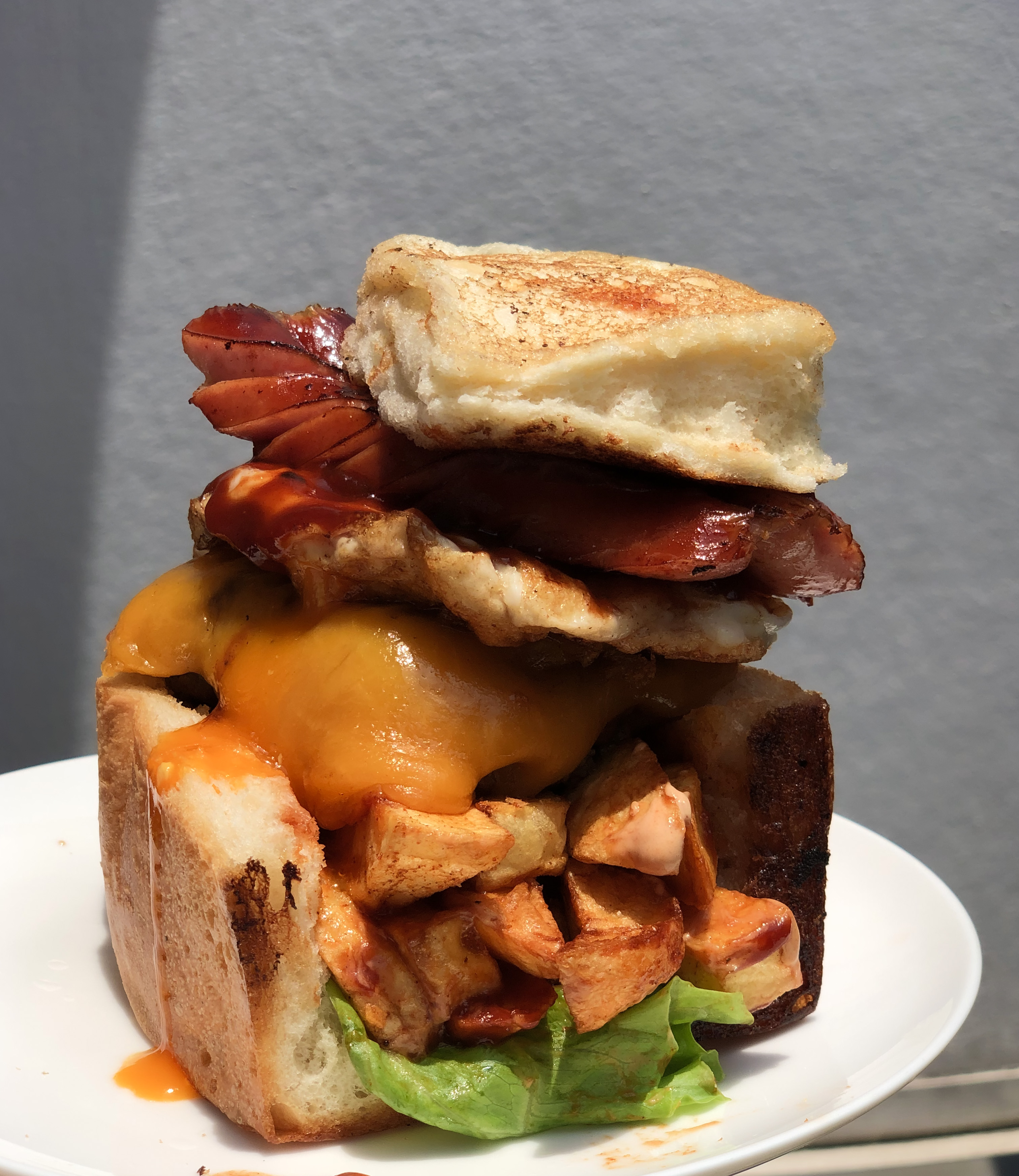
A spatlo, popular street meal in all provinces

==== Game and meats ====
Afrikaans

- Biltong—dried meat (typically seasoned with coriander seeds and salt). Although beef is most commonly used, springbok, kudu, eland, chicken, and ostrich may also be used.
- Boerewors—a sausage that is traditionally braaied (barbecued).
- Droëwors—translates to 'dried sausage' and is made like boerewors, but pork is left out. It is dried the same way as biltong.
- Frikkadelle—usually baked, but sometimes deep-fried, meatballs.
- Bokkoms—whole, salted and dried mullet.
- Skilpadjies—lamb's liver wrapped in netvet (caul fat) and braaied over hot coals.
- Smoked or braaied snoek—a regional gamefish.
- Sosatie—kebab, grilled marinated meat on a skewer.
- Amanqina—chicken feet, cow feet, pig feet, lamb feet, and sheep feet, usually consumed with pap or as a delicacy.
- Chicken feet—grilled or deep-fried chicken feet and head. Another dish is a cooked pig’s head known as a "smiley", most popular in townships and sold by street vendors, sometimes in industrial areas with high concentrations of workers.
- Ostrich—an increasingly popular protein source, as it has low cholesterol content; used in stews or filleted and grilled.

==== Meals ====
Tsonga and Venda

- Mashonja/matamani—made from mopani worms

Afrikaans

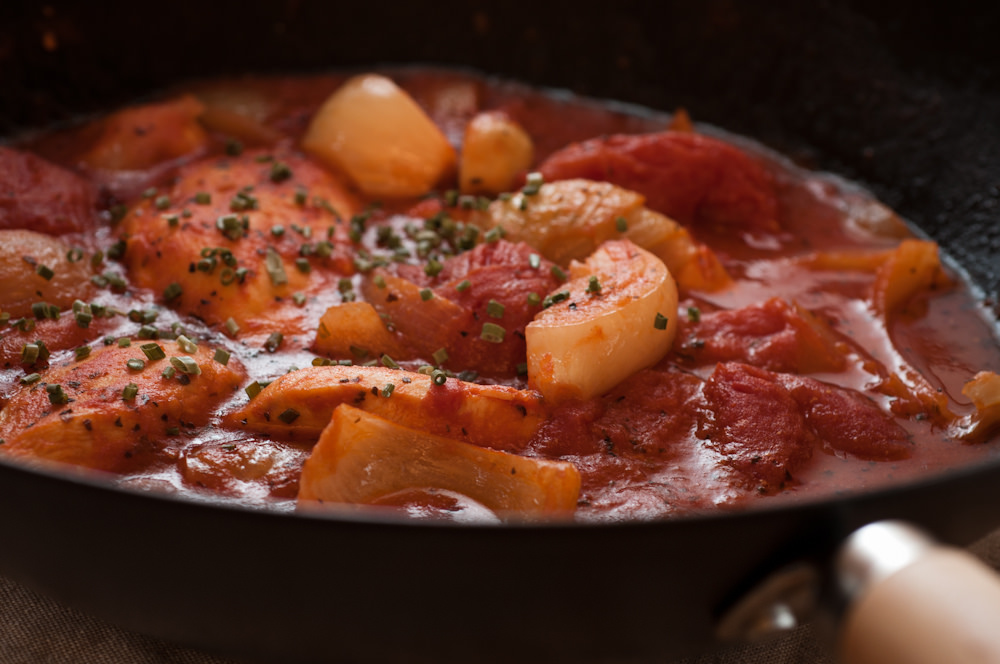
A serving of tomato bredie

- Gesmoorde vis—salted cod or snoek with potatoes and tomato sauce, sometimes served with apricot, grapes or moskonfyt.
- Hoenderpastei—chicken pot pie, traditional Afrikaans fare.
- Kaiings—made from lamb tail or lamb flank cut into small cubes, and cooked in a cast-iron pot over a slow fire. Kaiings resemble cracklings, though the skin is less puffy and crispy, and a small piece of protein is usually left on the skin and fat. They are a chewy traditional Boer delicacy, often served as a topping over pap or with honey.
- Mielie-meal—a staple food, often used in baking but predominantly cooked into pap or ugali
- Oepsies—a starter made on a braai. Similar to the American devils on horseback but exclusively made with cherries wrapped in bacon and battered with barbecue sauce.
- Paptert—a tart used as a side dish for a braai. Made from pap, cheese, canned tomatoes, and bacon. Both modern and traditional.
- Potjiekos—a traditional Afrikaans stew, made with meat and vegetables and cooked over coals in cast-iron pots.
- Tomato bredie—a lamb and tomato stew.
- Waterblommetjiebredie (water flower stew)—meat stewed with the flower of the Cape pondweed.

Indian

- Biryani—a traditional rice and red meat/chicken or vegetable dish originating from the Muslim community of the Indian subcontinent.
- Bunny chow—curry stuffed into a hollowed-out loaf of bread, often called kota by the locals (usually those of African descent) who sometimes, instead of curry, fill the bread with slap chips (French fries), a slice of polony (bologna), cheese, and atchar (South Asian pickle) and other fillings and spices.
- Durban curry—more spicy than the Cape Malay version due to the use of masala. Typically, mutton/lamb is used, and the most common spice mixture consists of ground cayenne pepper, paprika, cinnamon, cumin, and fennel. Potatoes and carrots are sometimes added.
- Lamb chop chutney—fried lamb chops placed in a tomato chutney with green chillies.

Malay

- Bobotie—a dish of Malay descent, is like meatloaf with raisins and with baked egg on top, and is often served with yellow rice, sambals, coconut, banana slices, and chutney.
- Cape Malay curry—a curry most often made with chicken and spiced with mild masala. Spices include cinnamon, ginger, cardamom, cayenne pepper, coriander, garlic, turmeric, bay leaves, and fenugreek.
- Sotok
- Indomie

Zulu, Xhosa and Sotho

- Dombolo—dumplings, flour mixture usually steamed in a pot.
- Isidudu/umdoko/motogo—soft porridge made from ground corn known as "mealie meal", similar to American grits.
- Mala mogodu/ulusu—a local variation of tripe, usually eaten with hot pap and spinach.
- Iinkobe—summer salad made with boiled corn.
- Sigwaqani—boiled beans mixed with mealie-meal.
- Mqhavunyeko—wet corn mixed with beans.
- Trotters and beans—from the Cape, made from boiled pig's or sheep's trotters and onions and beans.
- Pap/papa—maize porridge in South Africa, traditional porridge/polenta, and a staple food of the African peoples
- Umngqusho—a dish made from white maize and sugar beans, a staple food for the Xhosa people.
- Umphokoqo/phuthu—a cooked dish of crumbly maize meal.
- Umvubo—sour milk mixed with dry pap.
- Inhloko/Smiley—a boiled stew of a cow or sheep's head, usually served with phuthu.

==== Breads ====
Afrikaans

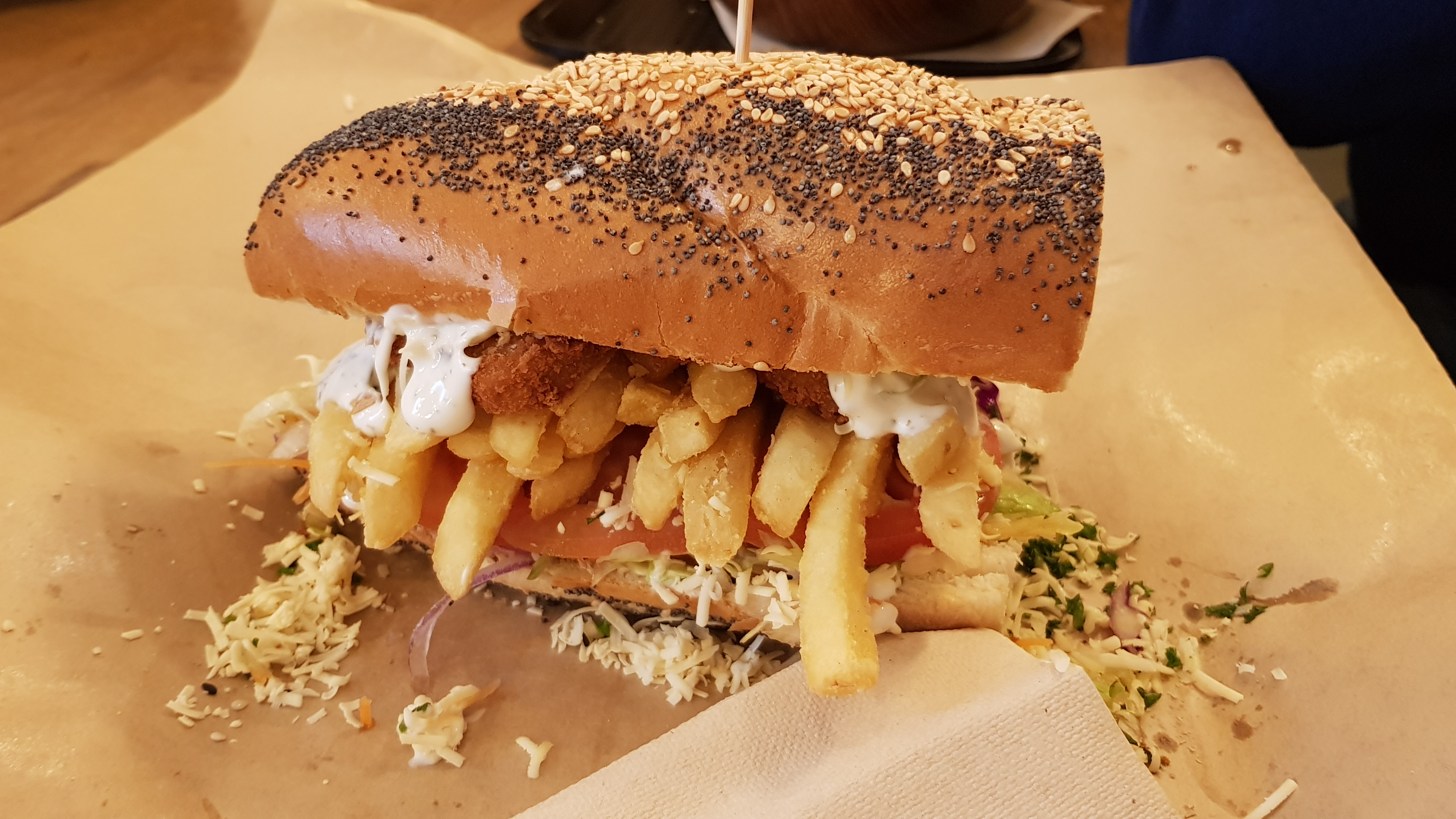
A gatsby sandwich

- Braaibroodjie—a sandwich consisting of two slices of bread with a filling of sliced tomato, cheese, onion, South African peach chutney (traditionally Mrs. H.S. Balls) seasoned with salt and pepper. The braaibroodjie is placed in a folding braai grid (gridiron) and slowly grilled over medium-hot coals until the cheese melts and the bread is browned.
- Gatsby—a sandwich popular in Cape Town, a long roll with fillings of anything ranging from polony (bologna) to chicken or steak and hot chips.
- Potbrood (pot bread or boerbrood)—savoury bread baked over coals in cast-iron pots.
- Vetkoek (fat cake, doughnut, Amagwinya (in various Nguni languages))—deep-fried dough balls, typically stuffed with meat or served with snoek fish or jam.

Indian

- Samosa, or samoosa—a savoury stuffed Indian pastry that is fried.
- Kota—a sandwich, quarter-loaf of bread usually stuffed with polony (bologna), cheese, atchar (South Asian pickle), and chips (French fries).

==== Relishes and spreads ====
- Blatjang, or Mrs. H.S. Balls Chutney, a sweet sauce made from fruit that is usually poured on meat
- Chakalaka—a spicy South African vegetable relish.
- Melrose Cheese Spread
- Monkey gland sauce—made of chopped onion, garlic, and ginger, with a combination of chutney, soy sauce, mustard, Worcestershire sauce, ketchup, and wine (no actual monkey meat)

==== Fruits and plants ====
- Makatane—a wild fruit that grows in the Kalahari desert. It is soaked in limewater overnight (to remove the bitter taste) before processing into a jam known as makataan konfyt.
- Marula—the yellow fruit of a local tree. Amarula liqueur is made from this fruit. The ripe fruit lying on the ground is processed into jams, wine, and beer. Many local communities depend on this fruit for extra income. The jam is eaten with roosterkoek and on venison steaks, such as kudu.
- Morogo—spinach-like wild plant sometimes seen as a weed. Traditionally boiled and served with pap, or dried in small lumps for extended shelf life. The traditional Afrikaner/Boer preparation usually incorporates onion, potato, or both.

=== Sweet ===
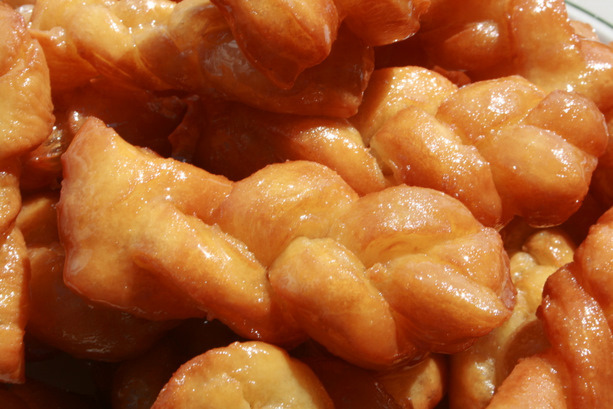
Koeksisters

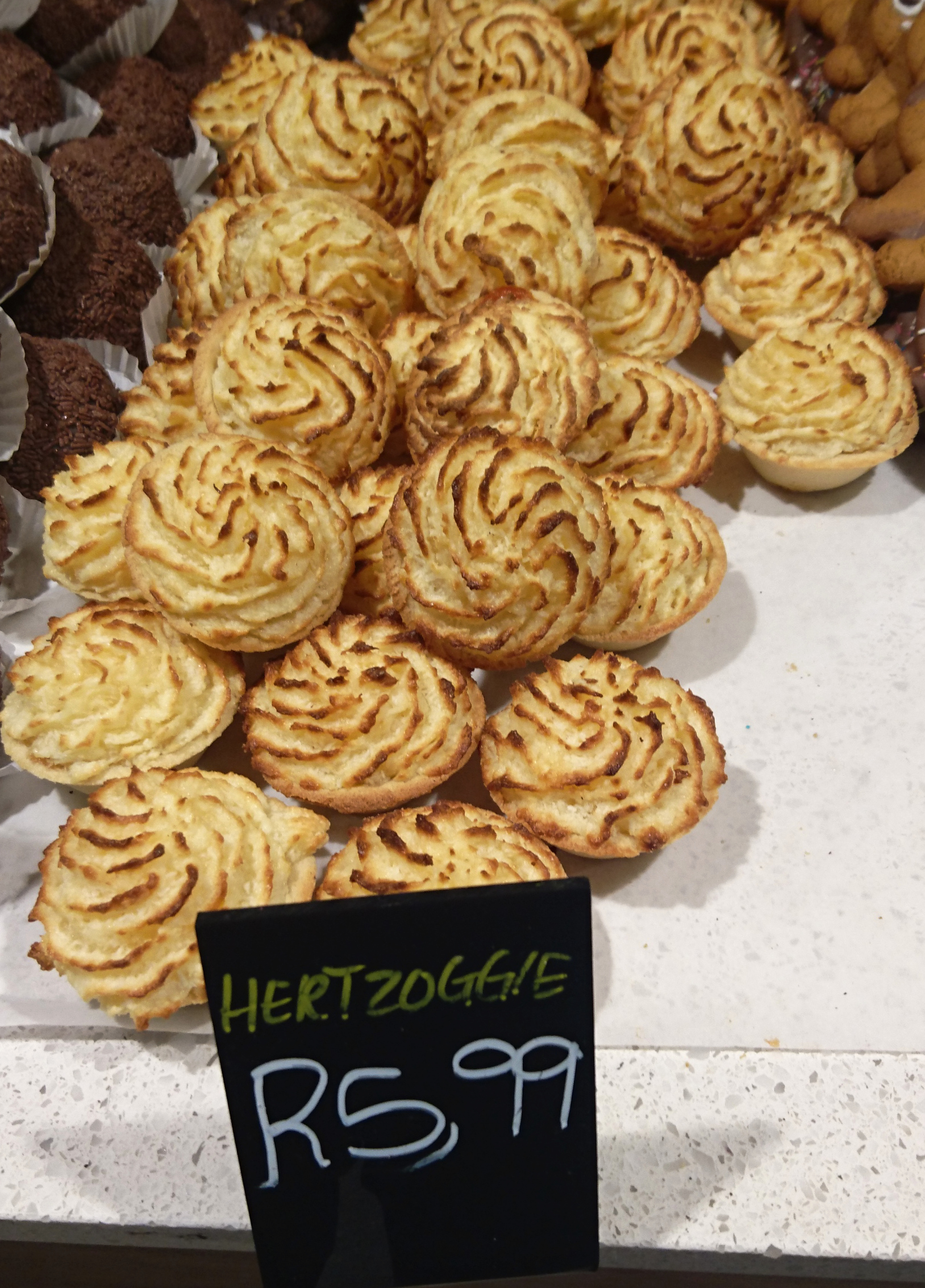
Hertzoggie

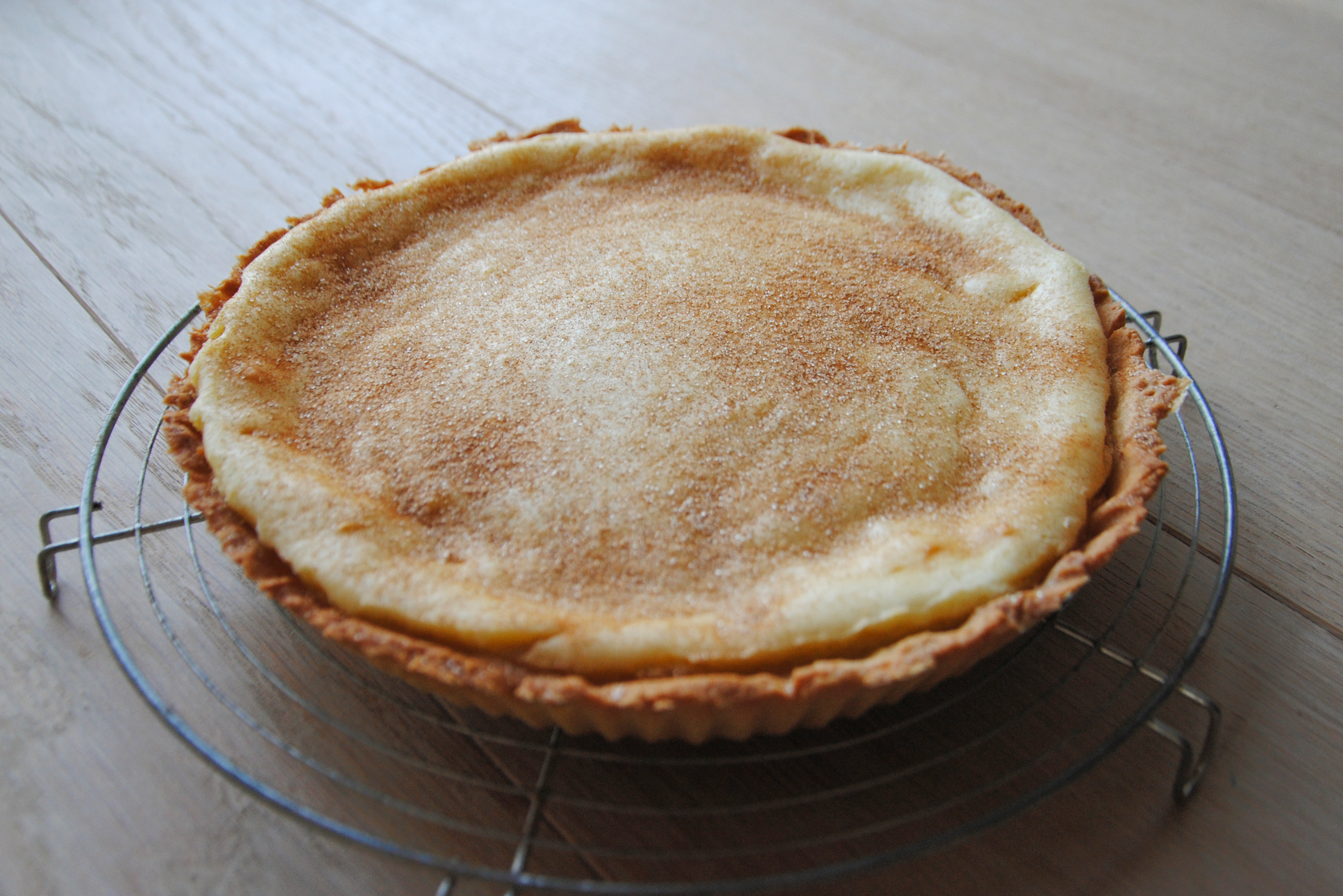
Melktert
- Bar One sauce—usually poured over vanilla ice-cream, made from melted Bar One chocolate and cream.
- Hertzoggie—a tartlet with an apricot jam filling and dried coconut meringue topping.
- Koeksisters—come in two forms and are a sweet delicacy among all South Africans. Afrikaans koeksisters are twisted pastries, deep fried, and strongly sweetened. Koesisters found in the Cape Flats are sweet and spicy, shaped like large eggs, and deep-fried.
- Malva pudding—a sweet spongy apricot pudding of Dutch origin.
- Mebos—dried apricots seasoned with sugar or salt.
- Melktert—a milk-based tart or dessert.
- Melkkos—a traditional South African dish. Served as a standalone dish for supper and for lunch in some instances. (Famous traditional cookbooks such as the "Kook en Geniet" don't refer to this a dessert though).
- Mealie-bread—a sweet bread baked with sweetcorn.
- Mosbolletjies—a sweet bun made with aniseed and a grape juice leavening agent from the wine-making region of South Africa. Baked twice to make mosbeskuit.
- Pampoenkoekies (pumpkin fritters)—flour has been supplemented with or replaced by pumpkin. Some variants are patatkoekie (sweet-potato fritter), aartappelkoekie (potato fritter), ryskoekie (rice fritter), where pumpkin is replaced with either sweet potato, potato, or rice.
- Peppermint crisp tart—a traditional fridge tart made with peppermint crisp chocolate, caramel treat, Tennis biscuits, and fresh cream.
- Rusks—a rectangular, hard, dry biscuit eaten after being dunked in tea or coffee; they are either home-baked or shop-bought (with the most popular brand being Ouma Rusks).

=== Drinks ===
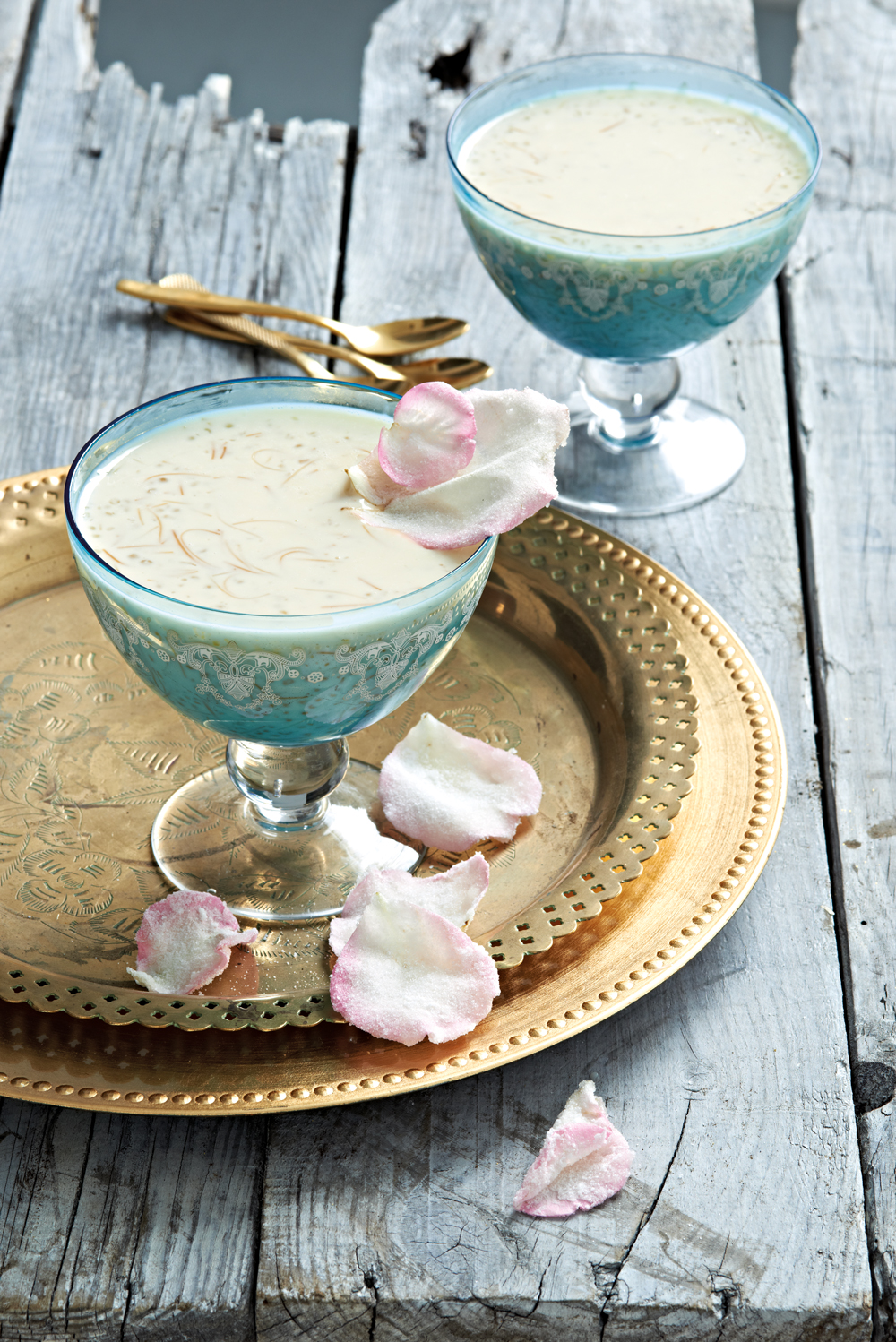
Boeber

- Amasi—fermented milk.
- Boeber—a traditional Cape Malay sweet milk drink, made with vermicelli, sago, sugar, and flavoured with cardamom, stick cinnamon, and rose water.
- Mafi—fermented milk, often consumed with pap or by itself.
- Mageu—a drink made from fermented mealie pap.
- Rooibos—a herbal tea indigenous to South Africa.
- Skokiaan—a dangerous bootleg drink consumed during the Apartheid era.
- Springbokkie—a cocktail shooter composed of crème de menthe (mint liqueur) and Amarula (marula fruit cream liqueur).
- Umqombothi—a type of beer made from fermented maize and sorghum.

== See also ==
- List of African cuisines
- Malay cuisine
- Indian cuisine
- Dutch cuisine
- South African wine
