= Malva pudding =

South African sweet pudding

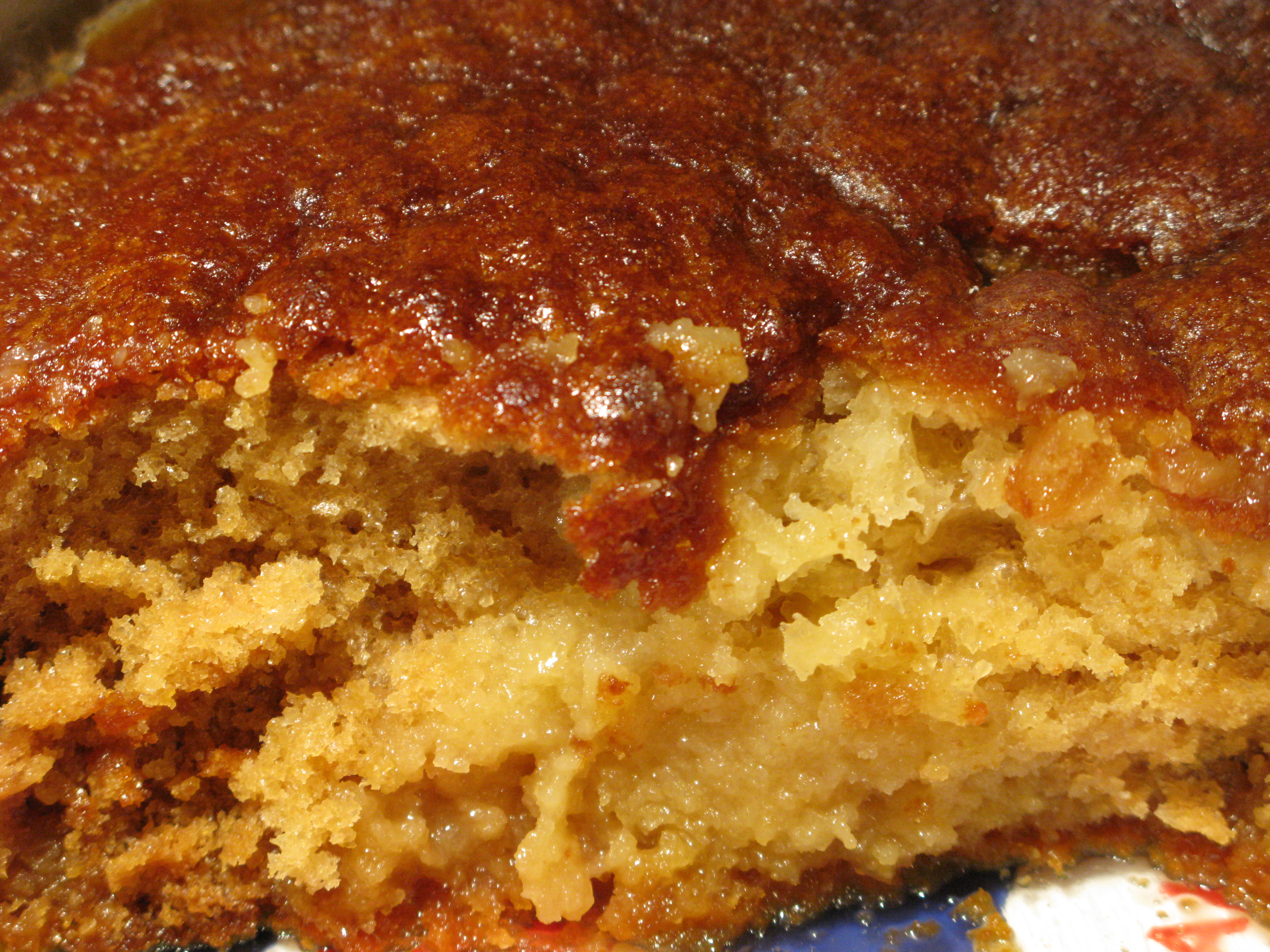
- Type: Pudding
- Place of origin: South Africa
- Serving temperature: Hot
- Main ingredients: flour, sugar, milk, apricot jam, balsamic vinegar

Malva pudding is a baked cake or pudding of South African cuisine. It contains apricot jam and has a spongy caramelised texture. A cream sauce is always poured over it while it is hot, and it is usually served warm with cold custard and/or ice-cream. Many South African restaurants offer the dish, which is thought to originally be of Dutch and Cape Dutch origin. It is widely available in South African (and in Botswana) supermarkets too, off the shelves.

== Ingredients, preparation and serving ==
The primary ingredients are flour, sugar, milk or cream, baking soda, vinegar, and apricot jam.

The ingredients are mixed using the creaming method into a batter and baked in a pan to create a cake. Holes are pricked into it, and while it is still hot a warm sauce or glaze made of butter, cream, and sugar is poured over it to seep into the cake through the holes. It is often garnished with slices of dried apricots, sometimes glazed or pickled.

The pudding is typically served warm and often with custard or ice cream. It is served in many restaurants in South Africa.

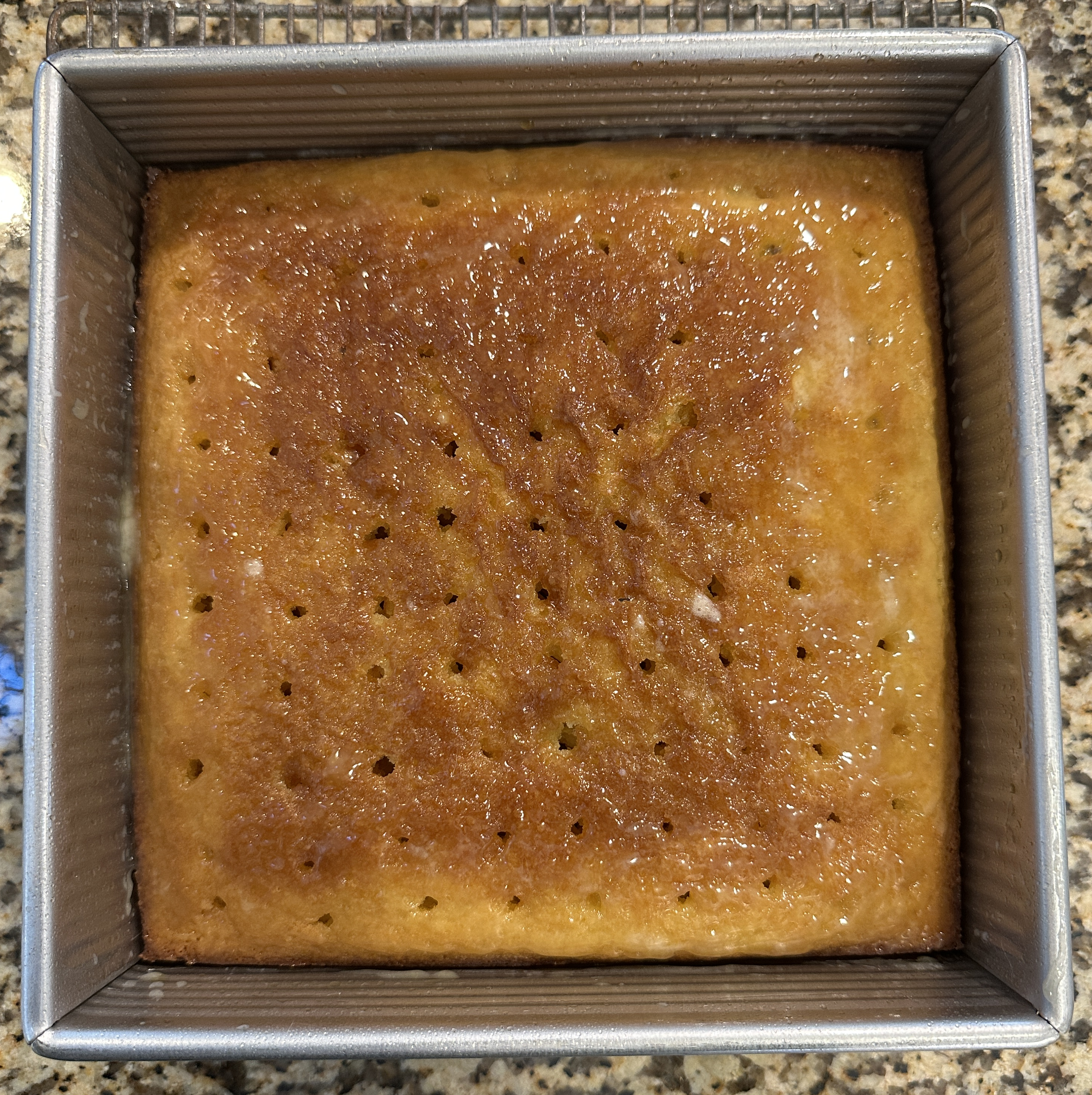
Malva pudding showing the holes into which the glaze is poured

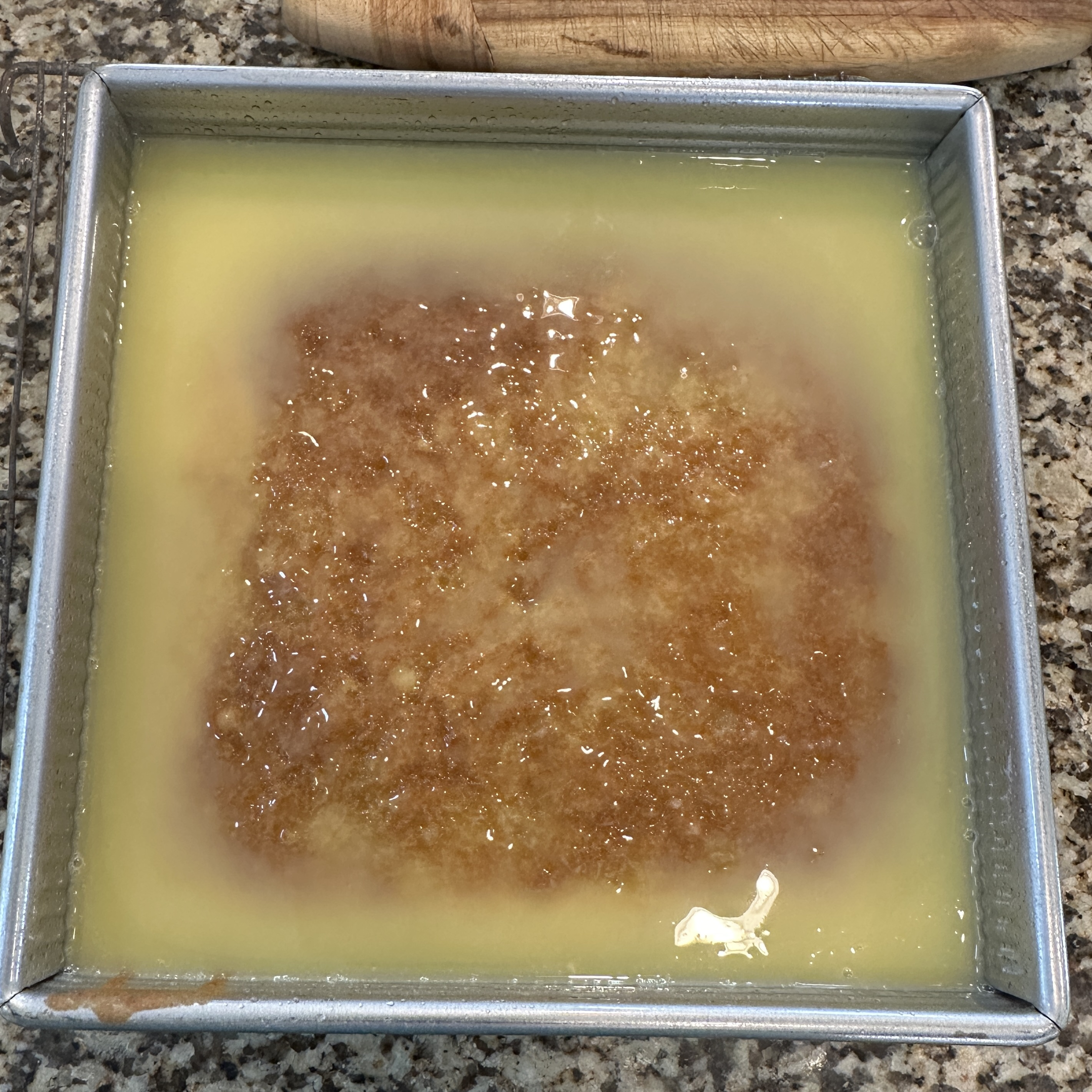
Sauce poured over pudding to soak in

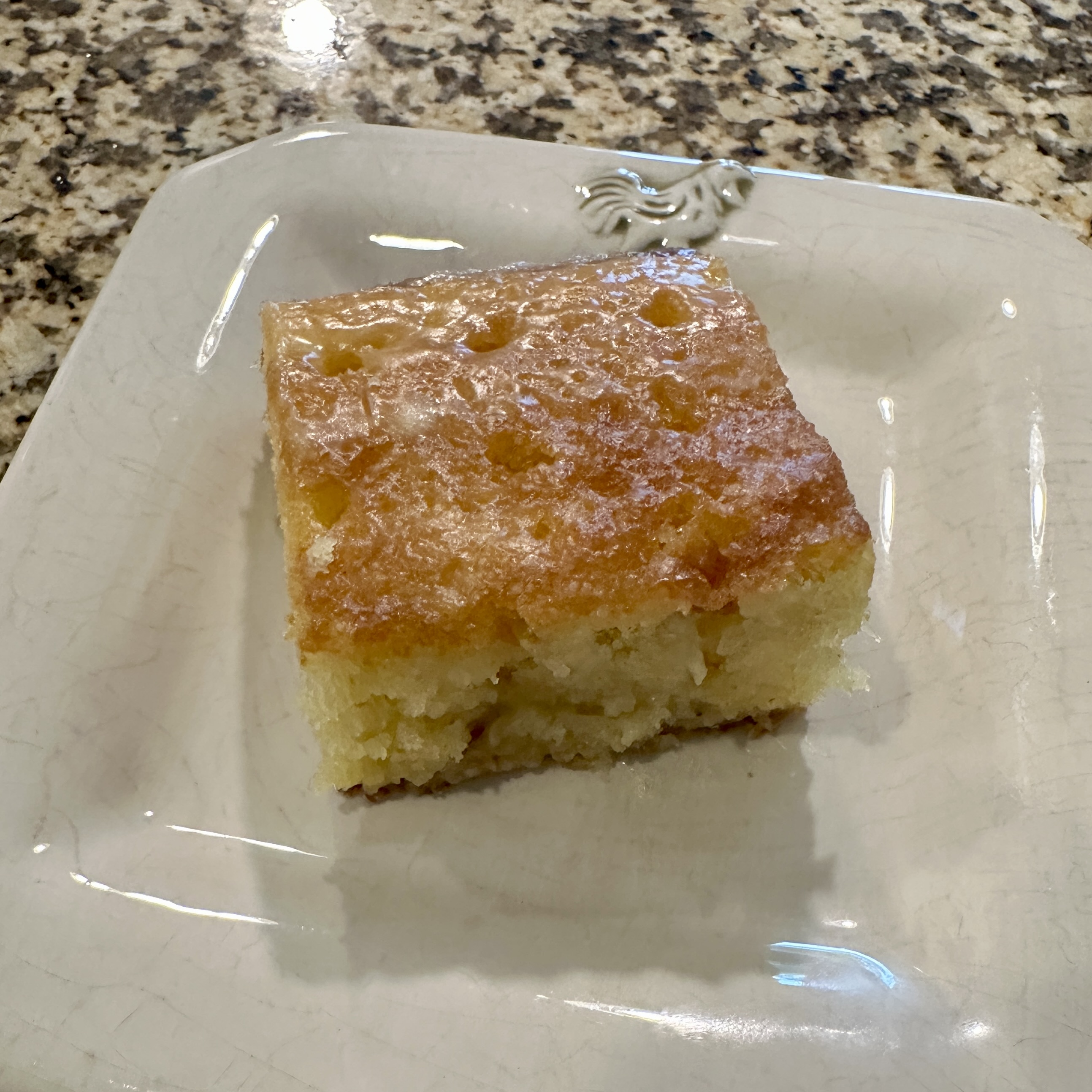
Slice of malva pudding

== Description ==
The dish is spongy and moist and is described as comforting. Genevieve Ko, writing in the New York Times, said, "Eating it for the first time feels like meeting a soul mate".

== Origin ==
The pudding is thought to be of Dutch or Cape Dutch origin and likely based on a similar pudding brought to the region by Dutch colonists in the mid-1600s; baking was not a part of the indigenous diet.

Recipes in South African cookbooks date to the 1970s, and a possible predecessor with the same name which is boiled rather than baked and does not call for the apricot jam that is ubiquitous in modern recipes dates to the 1924 South African Cookery Made easy by a Mrs. P.W. De Klerk. The dish is believed to have been made in homes "for generations" before it entered cookbooks and restaurants. It appeared on the menu of the Boschendal Wine Estate in 1978. According to the restaurant's chef, Maggie Pepler, she got the recipe from her mother, who called it telefoenpoeding "because farmers' wives would call each other up and read the recipe over the phone". A recipe for telefoenpoeding, which called for ginger and apricot jam, appears in the 1918 Oranje Kook-, Koek- en Resepteboek by Mrs. D. J. H. According to Ko, the dish's "creation remains a mystery".

== Etymology ==
There are various theories on the name, all of which are anecdotal. The Oxford English Dictionary says it comes from Afrikaans malvalekker, meaning "marshmallow" (ultimately from Latin malva, a mallow). This may arise from a resemblance between the pudding's texture and that of a marshmallow or a similar Afrikaner sweet, the malvelekker, made with the extract of marsh mallow. Malva is also Afrikaans for geranium (in the broad sense, including Pelargonium). Another botanical theory is that the batter was originally flavoured with the leaves of the lemon- or the rose-scented geranium, varieties of South African native plants. Another theory is that the sauce originally contained Malvasia (malmsey) wine. Proponents of this theory include brandy or sherry in the sauce.

== Popularity ==
The dish is particularly popular in Afrikaans households and in general in Cape Town. According to Sarah Jampel, writing in 2016 for Food52, the dish "has come to dominate the South African dessert arena as a singular, untouchable pudding entity".

The dish gained popularity on the West Coast of the United States after Oprah Winfrey's personal chef, Art Smith, served it for Christmas dinner in 2006 to pupils of the Oprah Winfrey Leadership Academy for Girls in South Africa. The dessert was a favorite of Nelson Mandela and Henry Kissinger.

== Similar dishes ==
Several very similar dishes exist in South African cuisine, including Jan Ellis pudding, which does not call for vinegar, and brown pudding, which is glazed with a sauce that does not include cream. Cape brandy pudding includes Cape brandy and dates.

== See also ==
- Koeksister, another Afrikaner dessert
- Melktert, another Afrikaner dessert
- Tres leches cake, another cake that is baked, pricked full of holes, and has a sauce poured over it
- List of African dishes
