= Mealie bread =

Traditional South African bread made with sweetcorn

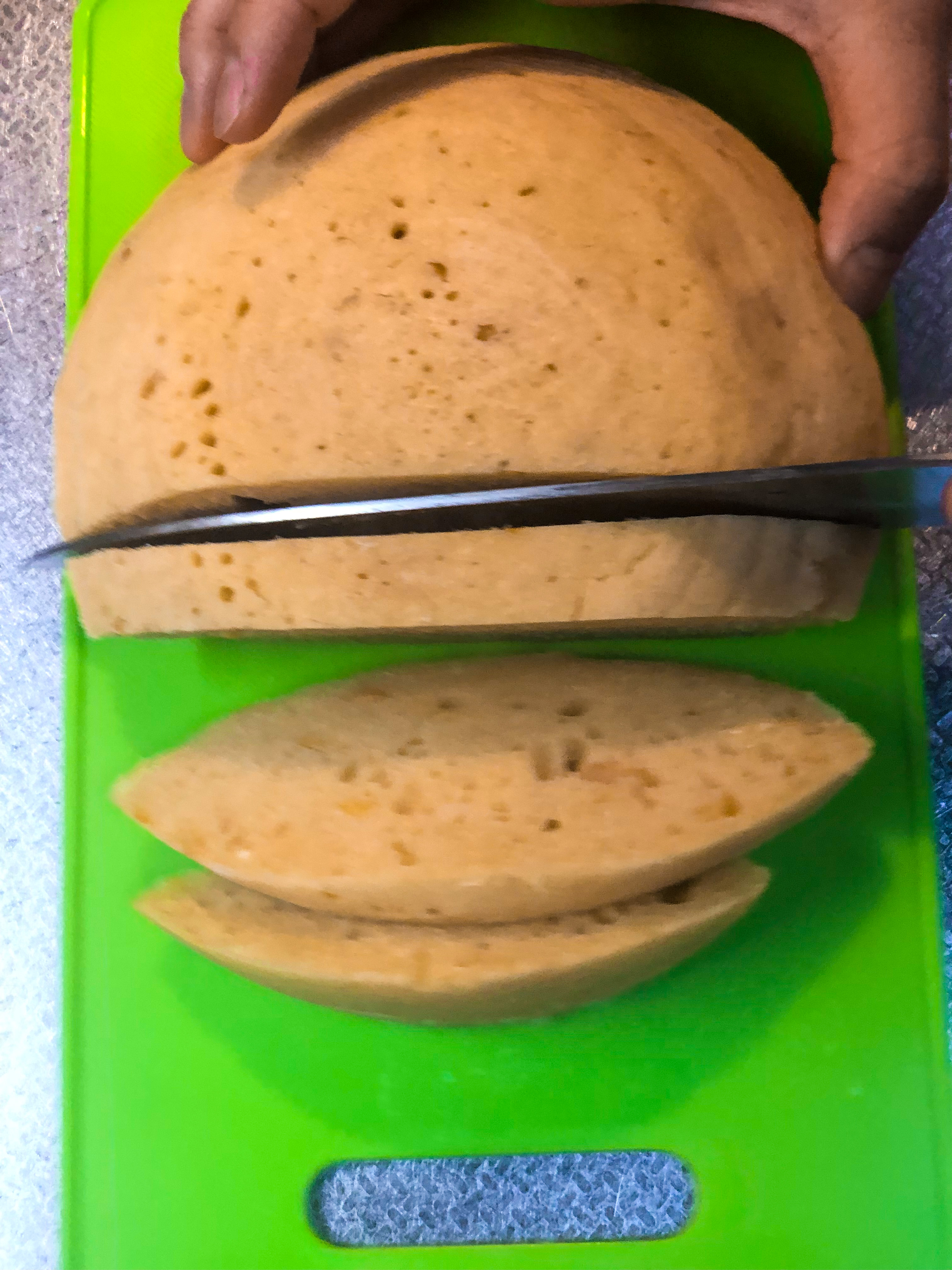
- Alternative names: Sweetcorn bread
- Type: Bread
- Place of origin: South Africa
- Serving temperature: Hot
- Main ingredients: Sweet corn (white maize)

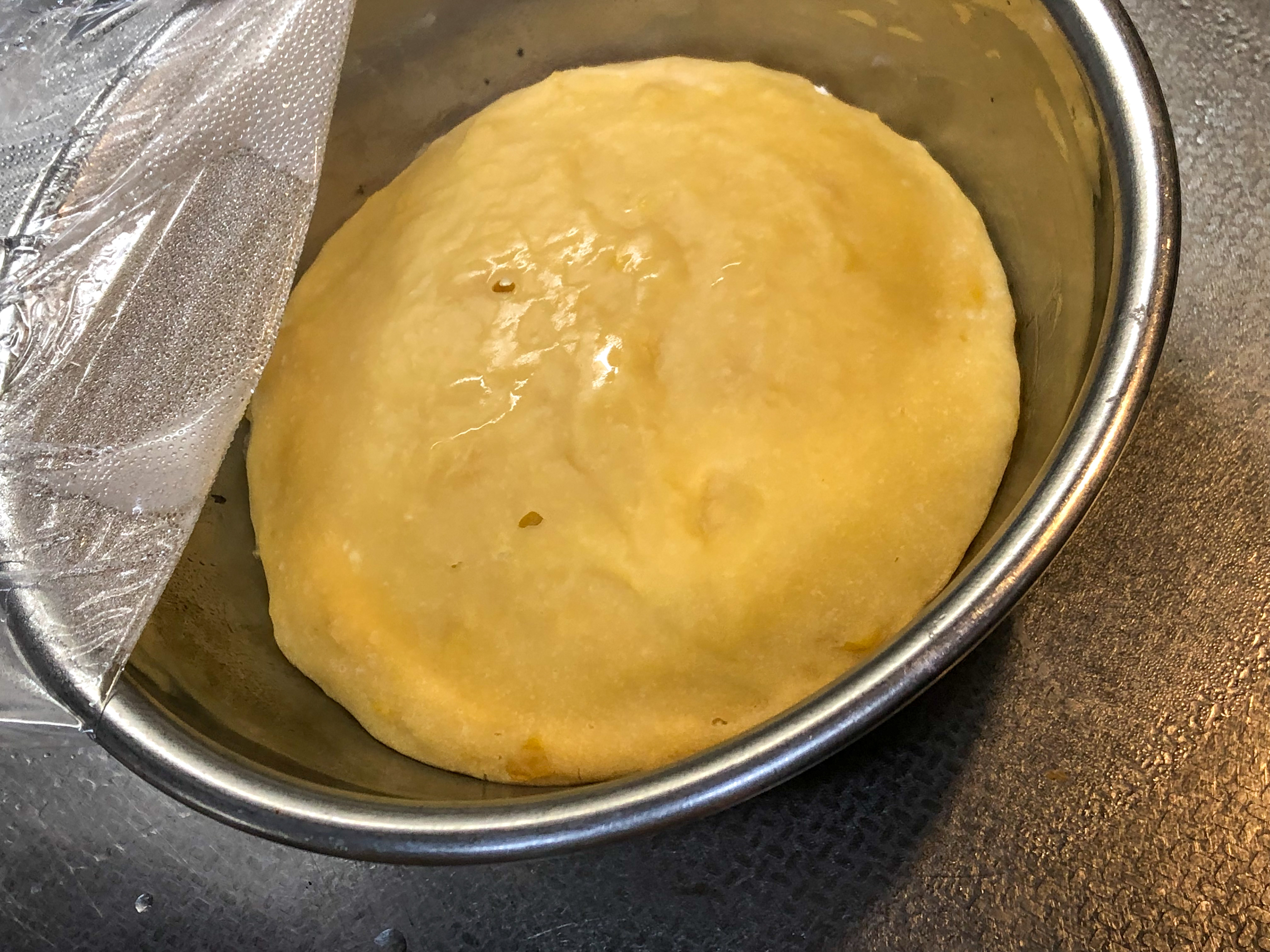
Mealie bread.

Mealie bread or sweetcorn bread is a type of South African cuisine. It is sweetened bread baked with creamed corn, traditionally buttered and eaten while still hot out of the oven. The bread is prepared with mealies, which is an African variety of maize. Traditionally, it is packed into metal cocoa cans, lidded, and then steamed in the can. In Eswatini, it is a common street food. Mealie bread is also a traditional meal in Eswatini It takes 20 to 35 minutes to prepare and 30 to 45 minutes to oven bake.

== See also ==
- List of breads
