= Koe'sister =

Traditional Cape Malay pastry

Koesister
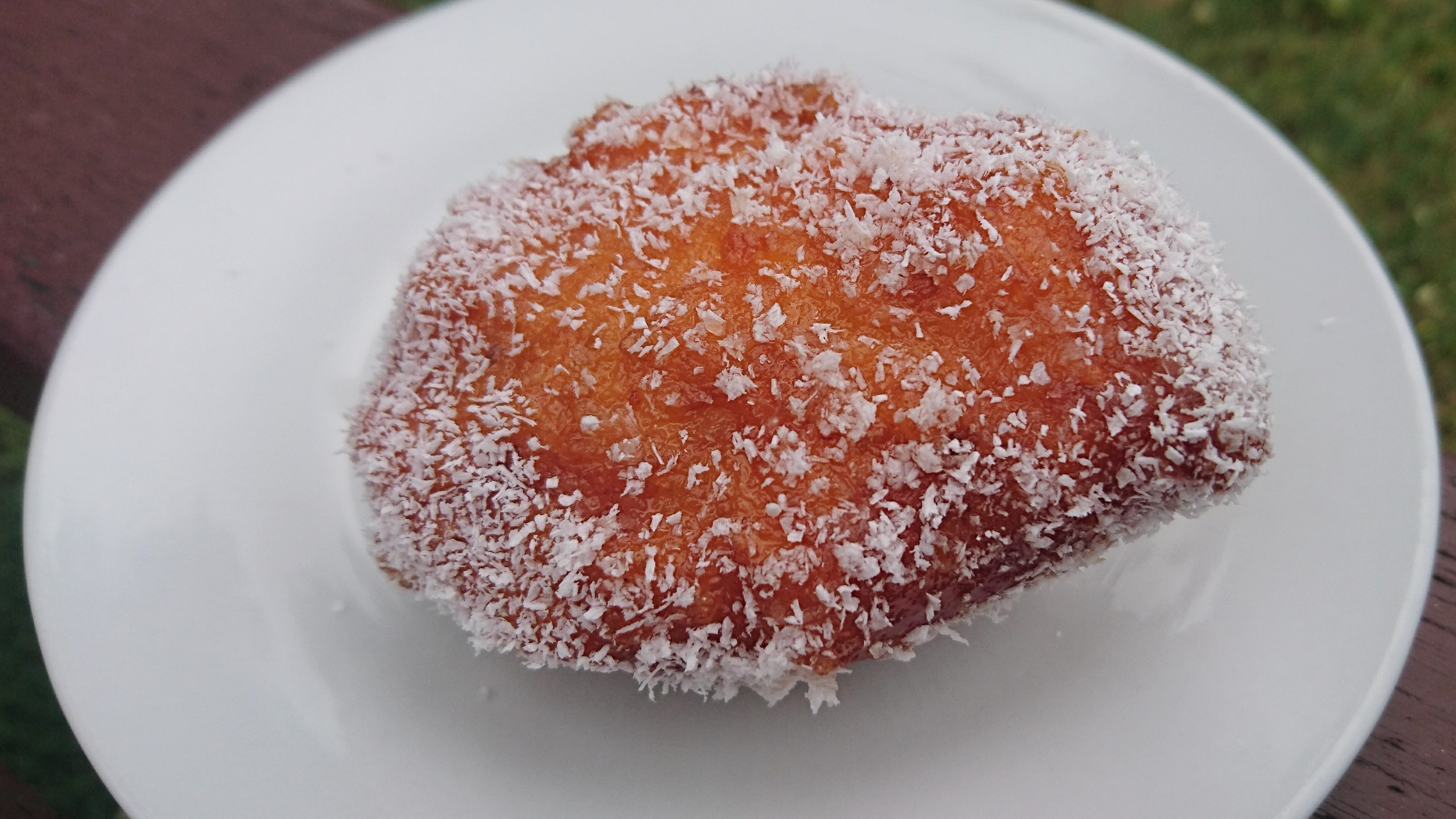
- Alternative names: Koe'sister
- Type: Pastry
- Course: Dessert
- Place of origin: South Africa
- Main ingredients: Dough, sugar syrup, desiccated coconut, spices

A koesister or koe'sister is a traditional Cape Malay pastry often described as a spicy dumpling with a cake-like texture, finished off with a sprinkling of coconut.

The inaugural World Koesister Day was celebrated on Sunday, 1 September 2019 at an event hosted at the Radisson RED Hotel V&A Waterfront, Cape Town, South Africa, in partnership with Vannie Kaap. World Koesister Day is celebrated on the first Sunday in September.

Cape Malay koe'sisters are prepared from balls of dough including yeast and flavoured with cinnamon, aniseed, ginger, cardamom and dried tangerine skin powder, deep-frying in oil, allowing to cool, then cooking for a minute in boiling syrup and rolling in desiccated coconut.

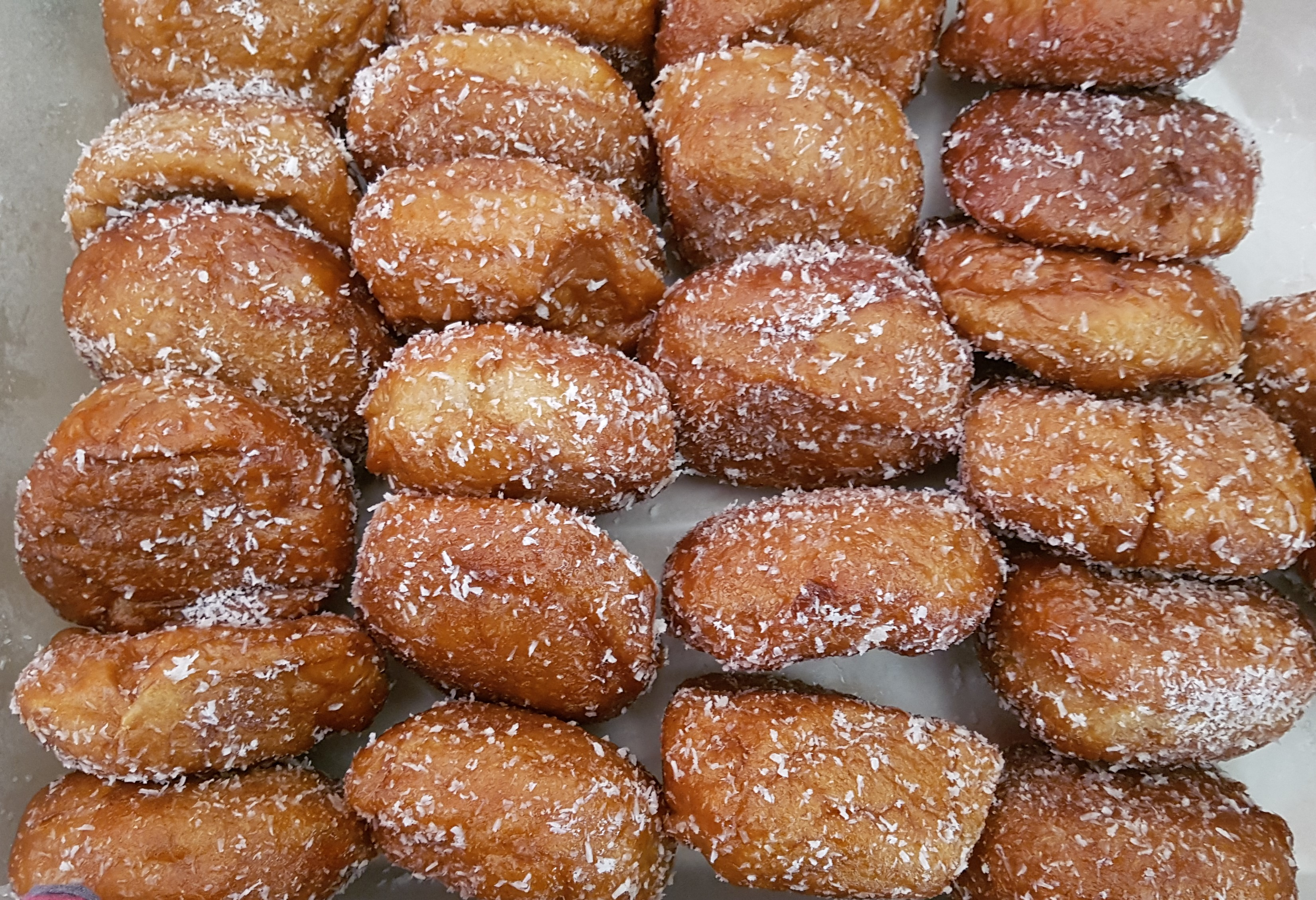
Traditional Cape Malay Koesisters

The frying of dough strips in this manner is of Malay/Indonesian origin, possibly with Indian influence, originally eaten as an unsweetened breakfast savoury brought to South Africa with Malay slaves, among whom they were known as koe'sisters, apparently suggesting polite gossiping among spinsters.

Cape Malay koe'sisters are different from the Afrikaner version called koeksister, which is a crisp and syrupy twisted or plaited doughnut.

== See also ==
- List of African dishes
