= Hertzoggie =

Jam-filled cookie

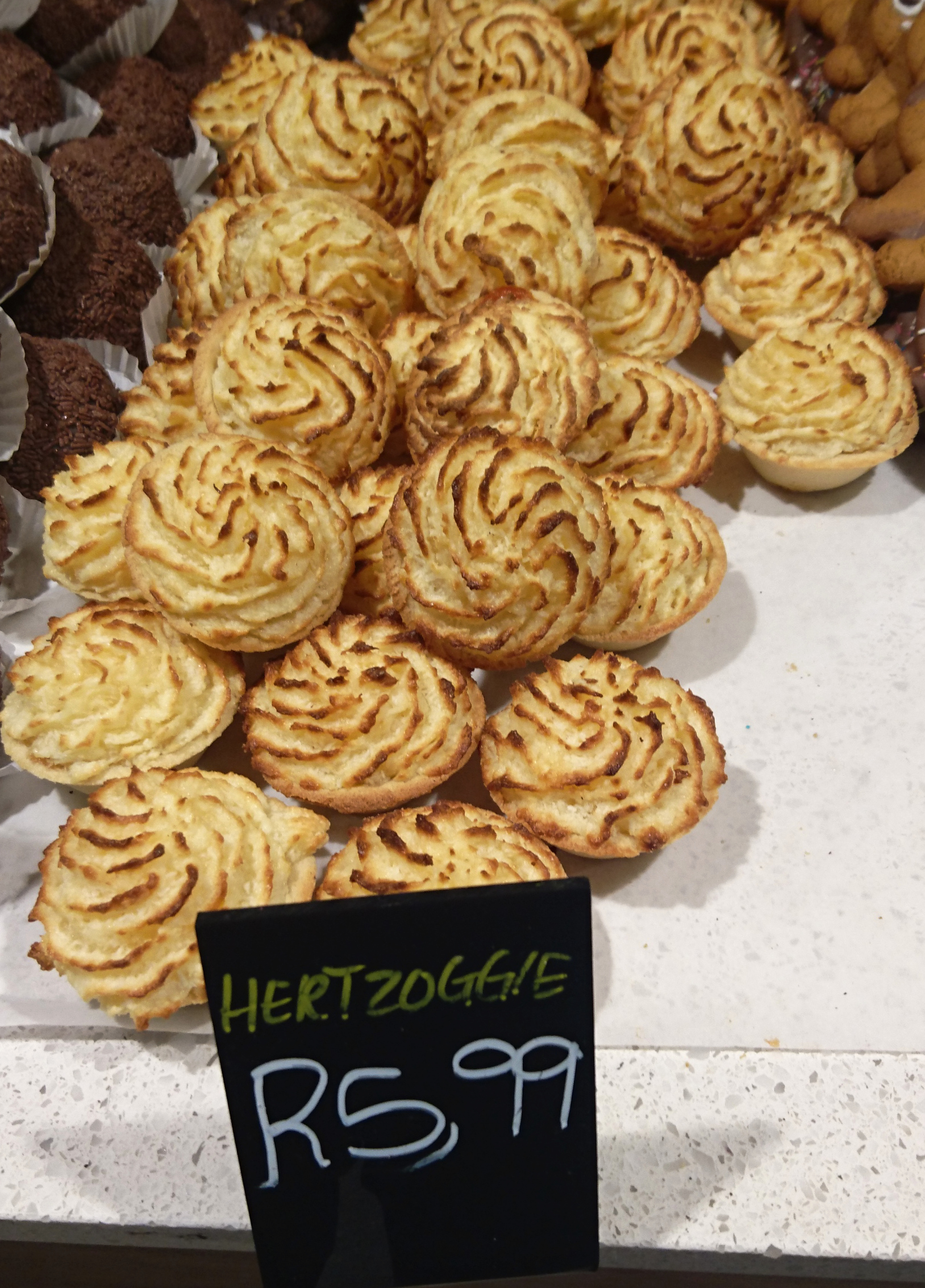
- Hertzoggies being sold in a South African bakery for R5.99 (roughly US$0.42) each.
- Course: Dessert
- Place of origin: South Africa
- Created by: unknown
- Invented: 1920s
- Main ingredients: Flour, salt, butter or margarine, sugar, eggs, apricot jam, baking soda, desiccated coconut
- Variations: Multiple

A Hertzoggie /hɜːrtsɒxi/, also known in Afrikaans as a Hertzogkoekie or in English as a Hertzog cookie, is a jam-filled tartlet or cookie with a coconut topping commonly served on a cup-like pastry base.

The cookie is a popular dessert in South Africa where it is often eaten with a cup of English tea. In the Cape Malay community the dessert is often eaten during Eid. It is often baked at home as part of a dessert-baking cottage industry in the country and sold alongside other popular South African desserts such as koeksisters.

== History ==
The tartlet is named after the early 20th century South African politician, Prime Minister (1924–1939) and Boer War General J. B. M. Hertzog. The Hertzogkoekies are thought to have been a favourite of his. Hertzog's supporters were known to have baked, served, and sold them to show their political support.

One story of the origin of the dessert states that it was invented by the Cape-Malay community to demonstrate their support for Hertzog after he promised to give women the vote and equal rights to the coloured community in the 1920s. After fulfilling the first promise to give women the vote in 1930, but not the second, the community began baking the cookies with a brown and pink icing called "twee gevreetjie", showing their dissatisfaction with him.

Another possible source of the dessert's origin is the Afrikaans practice following the Second Anglo-Boer War to name confections after national heroes.

== Composition ==
Hertzogkoekies are prepared from a pastry base with an open top that is filled with apricot jam. It is topped with a desiccated or grated coconut meringue topping and baked.

== Jan Smuts cookies ==
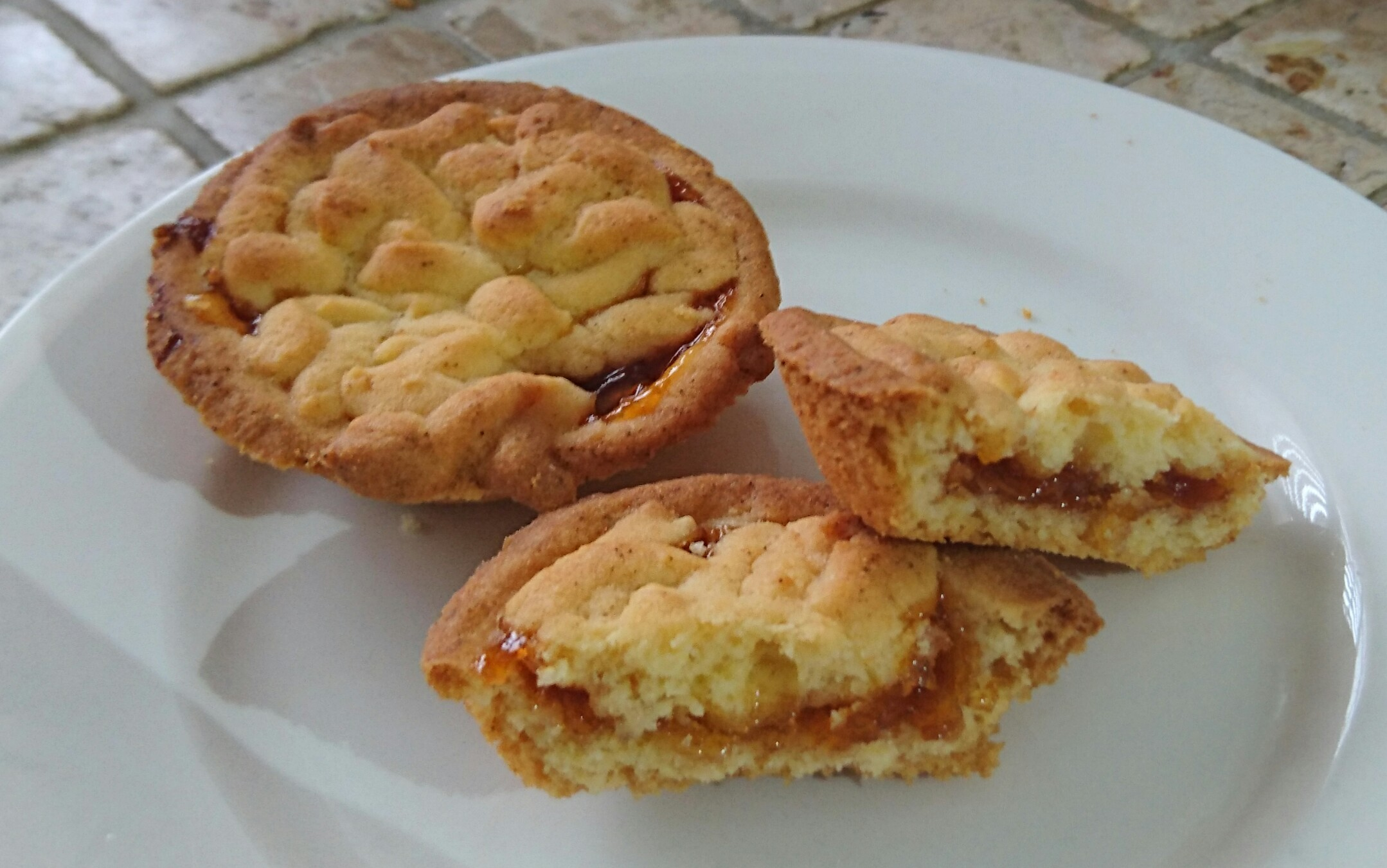
Two Jan Smuts cookies, one of which has been broken in two to show the apricot jam filling.

The Hertzogkoekie inspired supporters of Hertzog's political rival and contemporary Jan Smuts to bake a version of their own called "Jan Smuts cookies". This confection also became popular in the 1920s and 1930s. Jan Smuts cookies have a creamed butter and sugar topping instead of the paler meringue topping of the Hertzogkoekie.

== See also ==
- Koeksister
- List of African dishes
