= Bunny chow =

South African curry dish

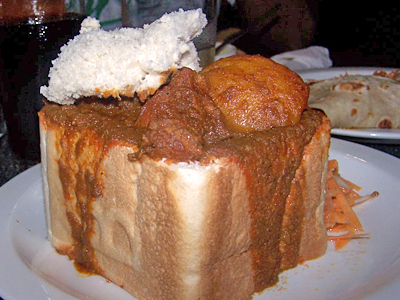
- A "quarter mutton" bunny with topping
- Type: Curry, sandwich, bread bowl
- Course: Lunch, dinner, snack
- Place of origin: South Africa
- Region or state: Durban
- Created by: Indian South Africans
- Serving temperature: Hot
- Main ingredients: Bread, curry

Bunny chow, often referred to simply as a bunny, is an Indian South African fast food dish consisting of a hollowed-out loaf of white bread filled with curry and a serving of salad on the side. It originated among Indian South Africans of Durban. Throughout various South African communities, one can find cultural adaptations to the original version of the bunny chow, which uses only a quarter loaf of bread and is sometimes called a skhambane, kota ("quarter") or shibobo, a name it shares with sphatlho, a South African dish that evolved from the bunny chow.

== History ==
Bunny chow was created in Durban, South Africa, which is home to a large community of people of Indian origin. The precise origins of the food are disputed, although its creation has been dated to the 1940s. It was also sold in Gwelo, Rhodesia (now Zimbabwe), during World War II and is still sold in the nearby town of Kadoma, formerly known as Gatooma.

Stories of the origin of bunny chow date as far back as the migrant Indian workers' arrival in South Africa. One account suggests that these laborers who came to work the sugar cane plantations of KwaZulu-Natal (Port Natal) were required to work long hours with only short breaks. During their breaks the workers at first would lay out their food on large leaves, but as this was time-consuming and their breaks were short, the workers found a way to quickly put their food together without it getting cold or taking up most of their break— hence the bunny chow. The bread that they made was cut into a hollowed-out bread bowl which they put their curries and vegetables in. This was also useful as they would be able to take it out into the plantation. Meat-based fillings came later. The use of a loaf of white bread can also be ascribed to the lack of the traditional roti bread as well as its weak structure; thus the cheap loaf, widely available at local stores, would be an optimal substitute vessel for the curry.

== Etymology ==
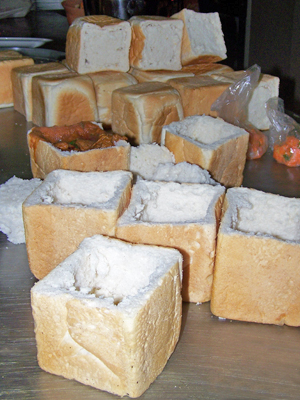
A table of hollowed "quarter loaves" to be filled for bunny chow.

One story claims that a South African restaurant run by South African Gujaratis—colloquially referred to as Banias first created the dish at a restaurant-café, called Kapitan's, on the corner of Victoria and Albert streets in Durban according to a 1984 account by G. Varma in Durban's Daily News, the dish also originated at the Queen's Tavern, where takeaway lunches were called Bunia Chow after the local slang term for South African Gujaratis, later evolving into bunny chow. Another tale opines that the origin of this handheld dish was due to Indian golf caddies not being allowed to publicly carry sharp cutlery like knives during apartheid. "Chow" in South African English is simply slang for "food" as well as the verb "to eat".

The traditional Indian meal was roti and beans, but the roti tended to fall apart as a take-away item. To solve this, the centre portion of a loaf of white bread was hollowed out and filled with curry, then the filling was capped with the portion that was carved out. The vegetarian version of the meal is sometimes known as a "beans bunny". An alternate, albeit unlikely, etymology is derived from a mondegreen of "bun" and "achar" (Indian pickles), though the latter are not usually included in the dish (unless as an accoutrement).

== Cuisine ==
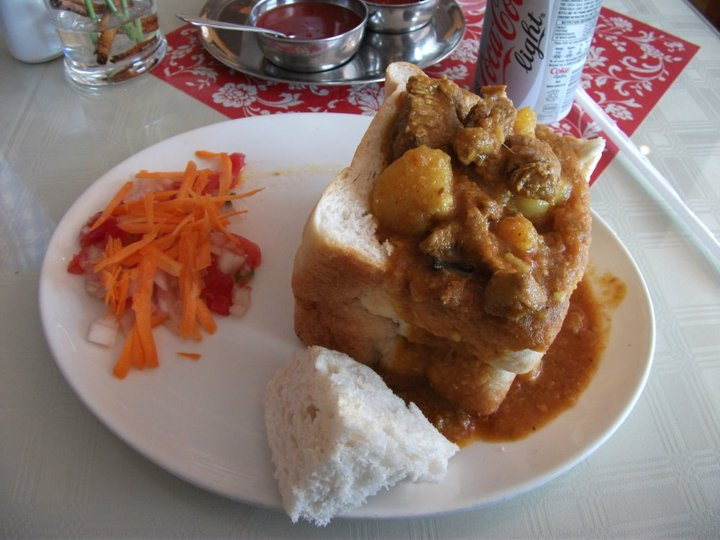
Quarter mutton bunny chow in Durban, South Africa

Bunny chows are popular amongst Indians and other ethnic groups in the Durban area. Bunny chows are commonly filled with curries made using traditional recipes from Durban: mutton or lamb curry, chicken curry, trotters and beans curry, and beans curry. Other varieties found across the country using less traditional Durban-Indian food include chips with curry gravy, fried sausage, cheese, eggs and polony. These are all popular fillings; the original bunny chow was vegetarian. Bunny chows are often served with a side portion of salad containing grated carrot, chilli and onion salad. Commonly known as sambals, this includes chopped tomatoes, onions, and green chilies served with white vinegar. Other sides include Indian pickles, such as mango pickle, lime or lemon pickle, vegetable pickles and other seasonal varieties which are pickled. A key desirable characteristic of a bunny chow is seen when gravy from the curry fillings soaks into the walls of the bread. Sharing a single bunny chow is not uncommon.

Bunny chows come in quarter, half and full loaves. When ordering a bunny chow in Durban, the local slang dictates that you need only ask for a "quarter mutton" (or flavour and size of your choice); colloquially, people would say, "Can I have a quarter mutton bunny?" Bunny chows are mainly eaten using the fingers; it is unusual to see locals use utensils when eating this dish.

Bunny chows were historically packaged in the previous day's newspaper. This is no longer common, and takeaway bunnies are more typically sold in "bunny boxes" which retain heat and prevent leaks from the curry.

Bunny chows are available in many small takeaways and Indian restaurants throughout South Africa. The price ranges from R 15 (US$1.01) for a quarter beans bunny or dhal, to R 50 (US$3.38) for a quarter mutton bunny, and generally one can multiply the price of a quarter by 3 or 4 to estimate the price of a full bunny. Bunny chows are ideal for picnics and beach trips.

Each year, the "Bunny Chow Barometer" is held in September on the south bank of the Umgeni River, just above Blue Lagoon (a popular Sunday picnic spot for Durban Indians), attracting numerous entrants from across the Durban Metro region to compete for the title of top bunny maker.

== See also ==
- Bunny Chow
- Gatsby (sandwich) – South African sandwich
- List of African dishes – Common culinary dishes found in Africa
- South African cuisine
- Curry bread – Japanese curry-filled fried pastry
