= Spatlo =

South African street food

Sbeva/sphatlho/kota
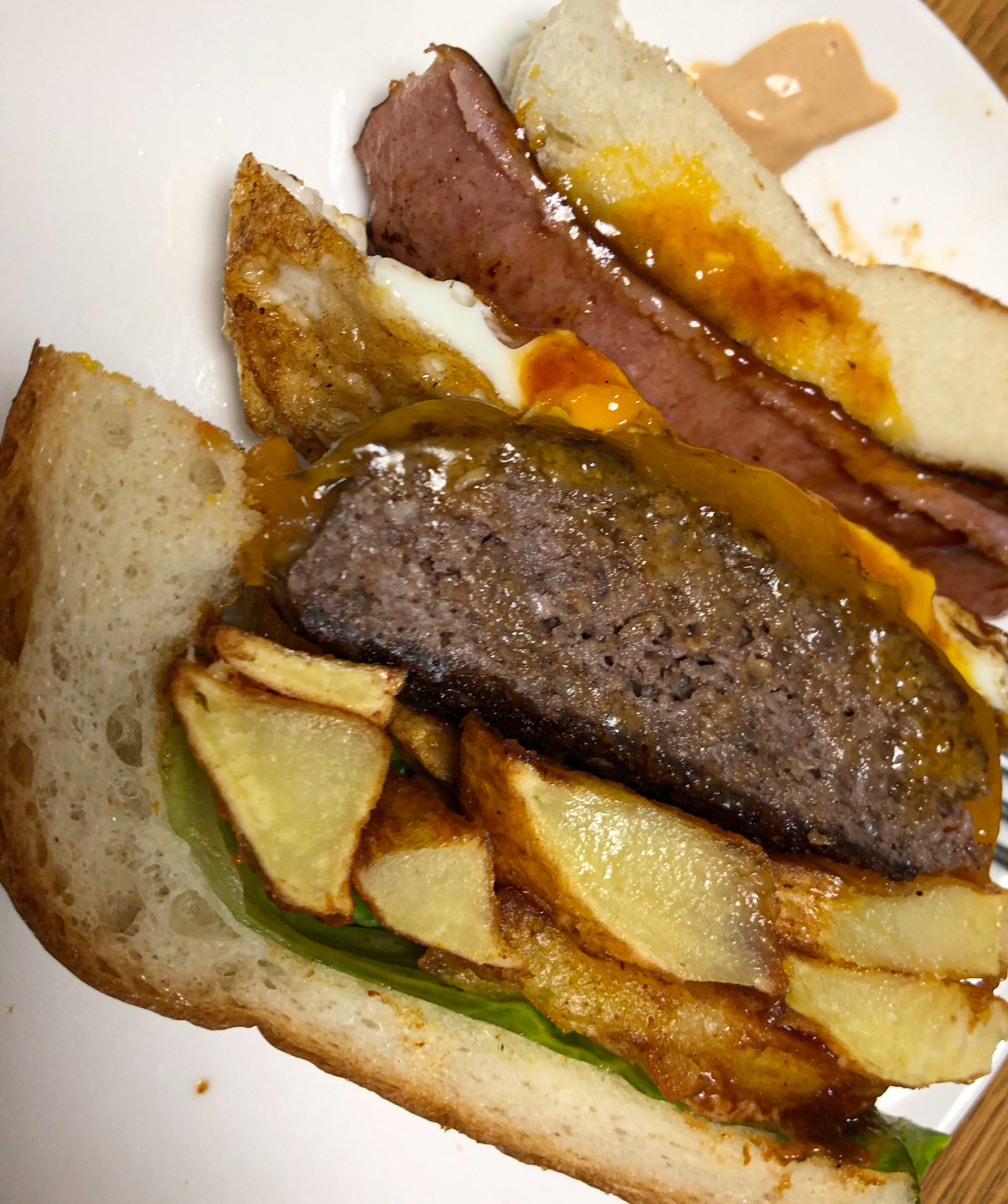
- Sphatlho
- Alternative names: Kota, Skhambane
- Type: Sandwich
- Region or state: South Africa
- Main ingredients: Bread; chips
- Ingredients generally used: Mango Atcher, Egg, Vienna, Russian Sausage

Sbeva, sphatlho or kota is a South African street food popular in all provinces of South Africa. It is effectively a sandwich with meat and french fries. In other regions, it is well-known as "skhambane".

== History ==
The kota concept started as a hollowed-out quarter loaf of bread filled with beef mince and mashed potatoes in the South African townships. Initially it was sold at schools during lunch breaks. It then evolved to being filled with fried potato "slap" chips instead of mash and other ingredients such as sausage, egg, beef patty, cheese, polony and atchar replaced the mince as it started being sold at tuckshops in townships. The name kota was derived from the English word quarter, referring to the size of the bread loaf used. The name sphatlho was derived from the Sesotho word "phatlhola", meaning to separate or break apart. The dish is derived from bunny chow.

== Spaza shops ==
Spaza shops sell popular street food, including kota. Spaza shops are the backbone of township economy.

Spaza shops that sell this popular street food normally set minimum prices at R15 ranging to over R120 depending on the size and ingredients. Consumers are largely students and low income individuals, because it is the cheapest alternative to hamburgers. This meal is usually available in every area across the country. Kota is considered a staple township food in South Africa and is often consumed with a soft drink, usually a cola.

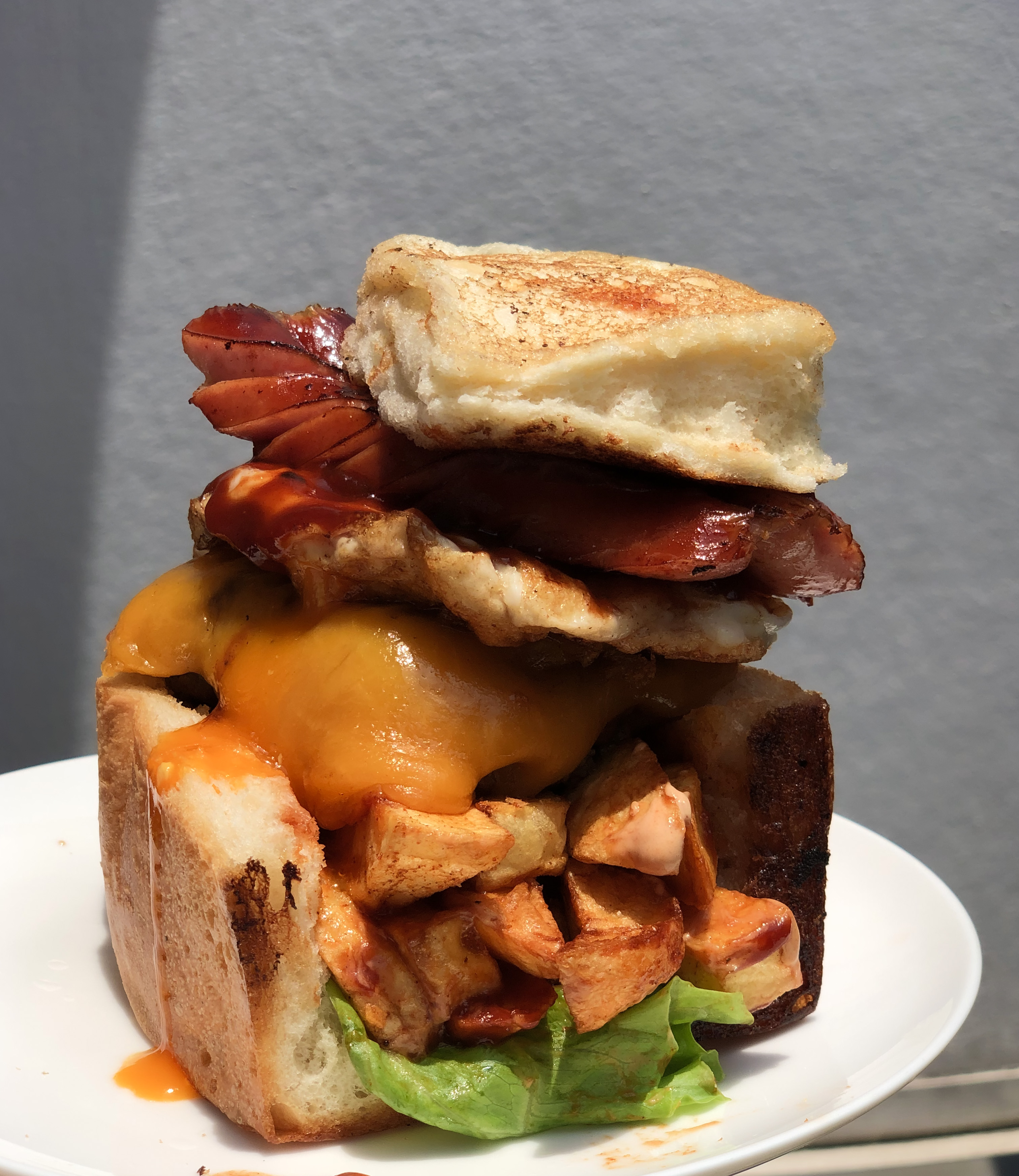
Kota
