= Mebos =

South African cuisine made from dried apricots

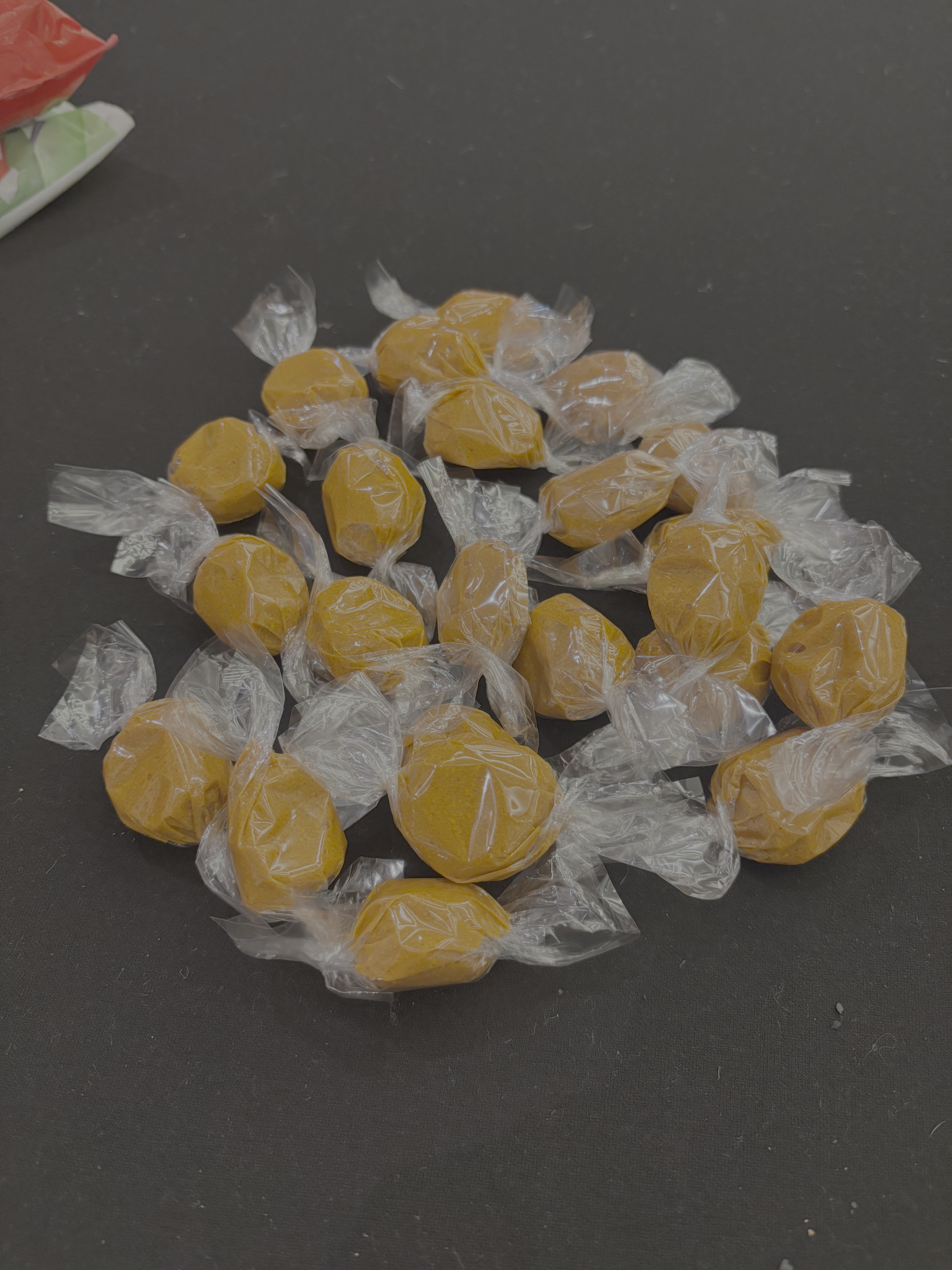
- Mebos sweets at the 2025 Wikimania Conference in Nairobi, Kenya
- Place of origin: South Africa

Mebos is a South African food made from dried apricots seasoned with sugar or salt.

The Khoekhoe traditionally prepared fruit by cutting them into pieces and cooking without water into a thick syrup. The syrup was dried in the sun for a few days on a flat rock, and then sliced into sections.

Later, during the colonial era, the Dutch East India Company brought apricots from Europe. The local apricot trees were highly productive, but produced short-lasting fruit, and these were then preserved with brandy or salt.

The word 'mebos' derives either from the Japanese 梅干し(umeboshi), sun-dried ume, a fruit closely related to apricots, the Malay word "membas", meaning to marinate or preserve, or the Arabic "mush mush", for apricot.

Brought to the Dutch Cape Colony by slaves from South East Asia, the earliest references to mebos were medical, but later it became known as a treat. The English author and translator Lady Duff-Gordon was described as having little love for Cape cuisine, but wrote about buying "Some 'confyt'; apricots salted and then sugared, called ‘mebos’ – delicious!"

South African author Olive Schreiner wrote in The Story of an African Farm about sending a character to "Go and buy sixpence of meiboss (sic) from the Malay round the corner."

Later, mebos were spread further into South Africa by the Voortrekkers, and it is mentioned in a Boer folk song: "Tante Mina kook, o sy kook die mebos stroop, Uit die bai’lekker app’kose daar op die grond" ("Aunt Mina cooks, oh she cooks the mebos syrup, from the very tasty apricots there on the ground").

The word is sometimes used to describe related foods, such as sugary minced fruit squares or dried fruit rolls.

== See also ==
- List of African dishes
