= Koeksister =

Traditional Afrikaner confectionery

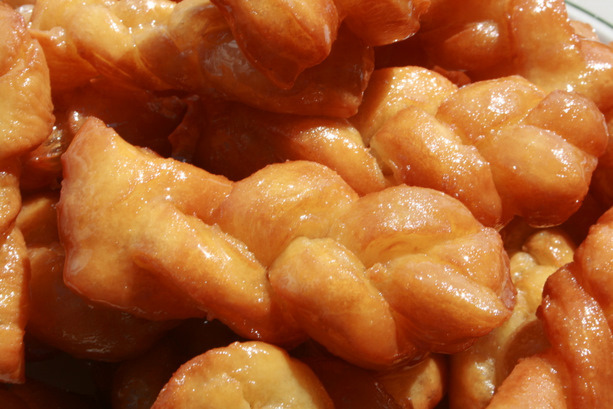
- Type: Doughnut
- Course: Dessert
- Place of origin: South Africa
- Region or state: South Africa
- Main ingredients: Dough, sugar syrup

A koeksister (/ˈkʊksɪstər/; Afrikaans: [ˈkukˌsəs.tər]) is a traditional Afrikaner confectionery made of fried dough infused in syrup or honey. There is also a Cape Malay version of the dish, which is a fried ball of dough that is rolled in desiccated coconut called a koesister. The name derives from the Dutch and Afrikaans word "koek", which generally means a wheat flour confectionery.

Koeksisters are prepared by frying plaited dough strips in oil, then submersing the hot fried dough into ice cold sugar syrup. Koeksisters have a golden crunchy crust and liquid syrup centre, are very sticky and sweet, and taste like honey.

A monument of a koeksister in the Afrikaner community of Orania alludes to the Afrikaner tradition of baking them to raise funds for the building of churches and schools.

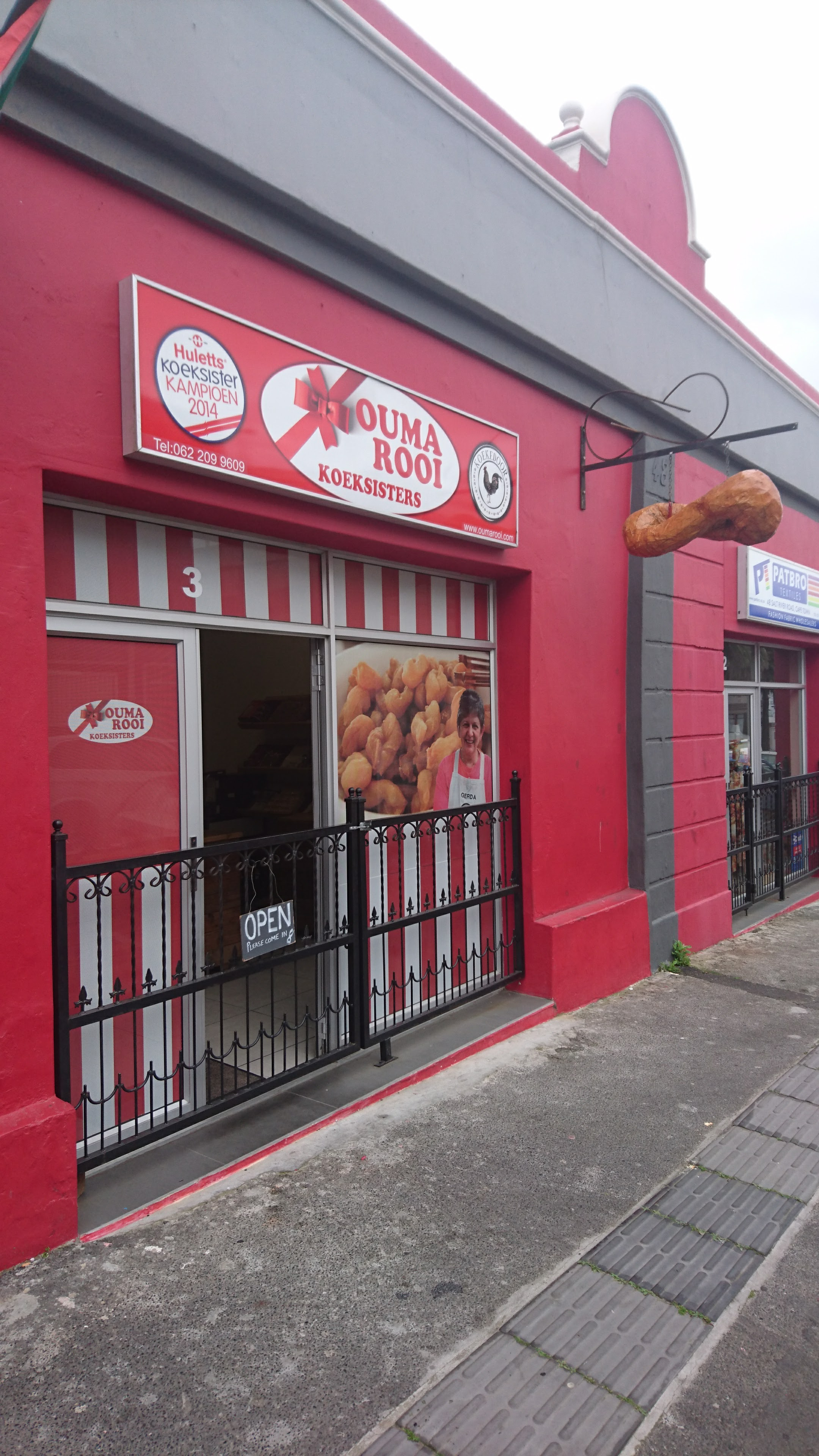
A shop specialising in the production and sale of koeksisters in Cape Town.

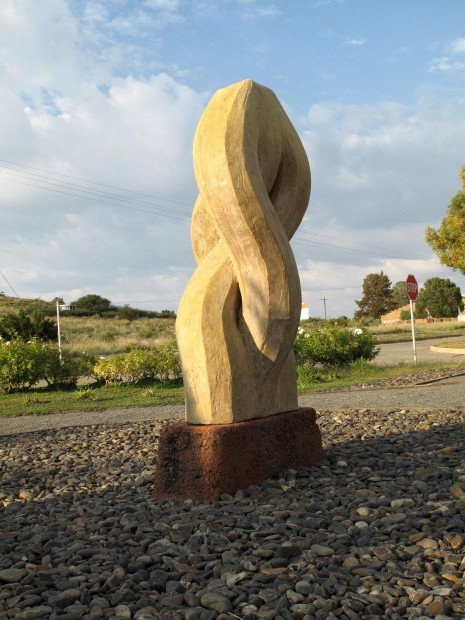
Koeksister Monument in Orania

== See also ==
- List of African dishes
- List of doughnut varieties
- Youtiao
