= List of African dishes =

Common culinary dishes found in Africa

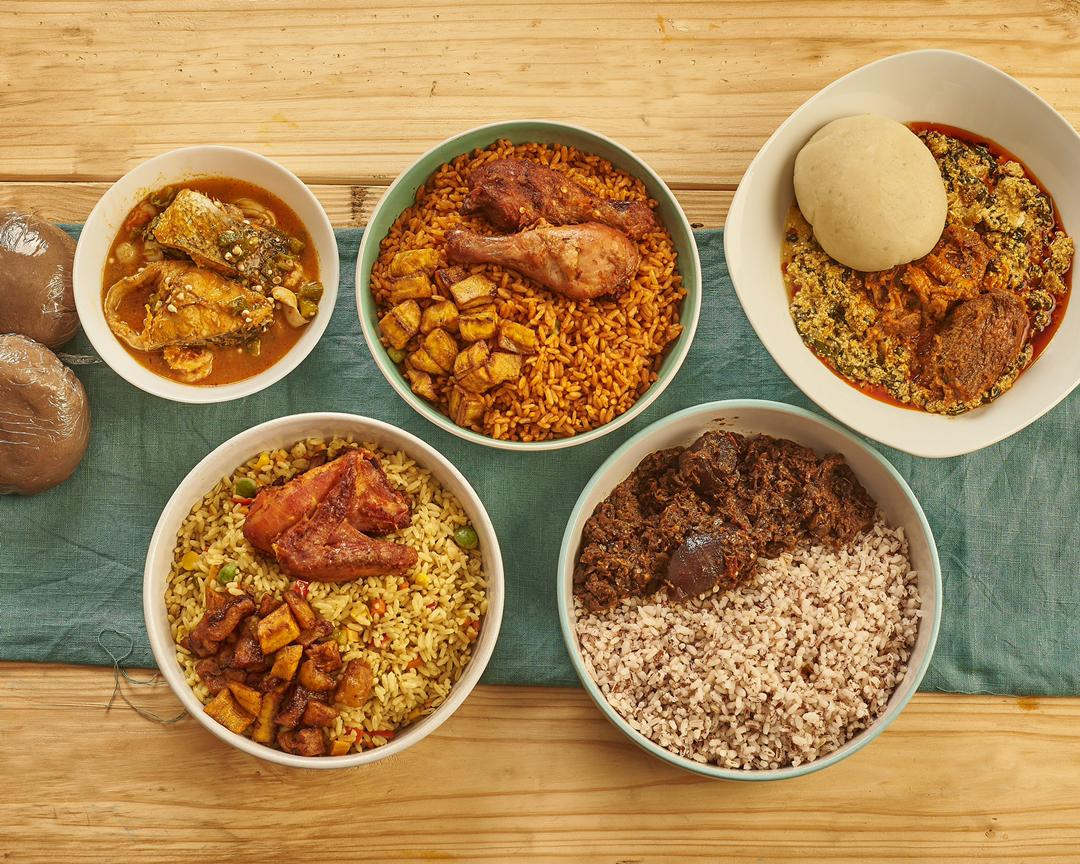
Five African dishes from Nigeria

Africa is the second-largest continent on Earth, and is home to hundreds of different cultural and ethnic groups. This diversity is reflected in the many local culinary traditions in choice of ingredients, style of preparation, and cooking techniques.

== African dishes ==
Name of dish	Image	Country/region	Description
Achu/Achou		Cameroon	A dish consisting of pounded cocoyams and a red palm oil soup, served with cow skin, oxtail, tripe, and steamed eggplant
Ming'oko		Tanzania	A dish of wild edible yams
Afang		Nigeria	A vegetable soup which has its origin from the Efik people in the southeast of Nigeria
Ahriche		Morocco	Tripe wrapped around sticks and cooked over hot coals
Akara, or koose		Nigeria, Benin, Ghana and Sierra Leone	A Yoruba food made from peeled beans made into balls and deep-fried, known as Koose in Hausa and Ghana, can be eaten as a snack, but is often coupled with hausa koko as part of a breakfast meal.
Alloco (Nigeria: dodo)		Côte d'Ivoire (Nigeria and Ghana)	A fried plantain snack, often served with chili pepper and onions (Nigeria and Ghana: eaten as a snack or as side with rice and/or bean)
Amala		Nigeria, Benin, Togo	A Yoruba Yam flour mold/"Okele", served with a variety of soups
Asida		North Africa	A lump of cooked wheat flour dough, sometimes with butter or honey added
Attiéké		Côte d'Ivoire	A side or main dish made from cassava
Babute		Democratic Republic of Congo	Ground beef, curry powder, and apricots
Banga soup		Nigeria, Ghana, and Cameroon	It is made from palm nuts and is eaten primarily in the southern and midwestern parts of Nigeria. In Ghana, the Akan ethnic group call it Abenkwan and it is eaten with fufu.
Bariis Iskukaris		Somalia - Somaliland	Cooked Rice with chicken or Lamb meat , sold in cafes , restaurants and hotels in Eastern Africa.
Bazeen		Libya	Barley dough served with tomato sauce, eggs, potatoes, and mutton.
Bichak		Morocco	A stuffed tricornered appetizer.
Biltong, Kilichi or Segwapa		Southern Africa, Zimbabwe, Botswana, South Africa, Cameroon, Niger, Nigeria, Zambia, Namibia	Similar to jerky. Raw meat, such as beef or game meats like ostrich, cut into strips, cured and dried. Also called segwapa in Botswana
Bobotie		South Africa	Spiced ground meat with an egg topping.
Boerewors		South Africa, Zimbabwe Zambia, Namibia	This is a South African spiced mixed-meat sausage that was developed by the Afrikaans-speaking white farmers, the Boere, and is now used nationwide as a symbol of heritage by all races. It contains coarsely minced beef, pork and occasionally lamb. It is traditionally flavored with coriander and black pepper but can have a multitude of spices, like chilli pepper. Though each butcher has his own unique recipe, a council has been formed to evaluate exactly what can be labelled as "boerewors". The council has stated that the requirements for labelling it as boerewors is that the sausage must contain 80% or more ground beef, 20% or less pork (including cubes of pork fat) and the spices coriander and black pepper.
Boerewors		South Africa	This a popular South African variant of the global hot dog phenomenon. It consists of a braaied boerewors served in a hot dog bun with onion relish and usually ketchup /tomato sauce and mustard. It can also be served with various chilli sauces.
Braaibroodjie		South Africa, Namibia	This is a popular South African variant of a toasted sandwich, where the sandwich is grilled (braaied) over an open charcoal or wood flame instead of in an electric sandwich toaster. The name translates directly as "grilled-sandwich".
Brik		Tunisia	Stuffed pastry.
Briouat		Morocco	Sweet puff pastry.
Bunny chow		South Africa, Zimbabwe	Often simply called "Bunny", a fast food dish that is a hollowed out loaf of bread filled with curry.
Cachupa		Cape Verde, São Tomé and Príncipe	A stew of hominy, beans, and meat.
Calulu		Angola, São Tomé and Príncipe	Dried fish with vegetables, often onions, tomatoes, okra, sweet potatoes, garlic, palm oil, and gimboa leaves (similar to spinach); often served with rice, funge, palm oil beans, and farofa.
Chakalaka		South Africa, Zimbabwe	Vegetable relish.
Chakhchoukha		Algeria	A stew of lamb, spices, tomatoes, and flatbread.
Chermoula		North Africa	A marinade of oil, lemon juice, pickled lemons, herbs, garlic, cumin, and salt, most often used to flavor seafood.
Cocada amarela		Angola	A dessert of eggs and coconut.
Couscous		North Africa	A semolina pasta.
Dabo kolo		Eritrea, Ethiopia, Democratic Republic of the Congo	Small pieces of bread fried in oil.
Dambou		Niger	A semolina (or other grain) dish prepared with moringa leaves. Eaten at any time, but especially at outdoorings and weddings.
Delele		Zimbabwe, Botswana	Okra prepared with baking soda.
Draw soup		Nigeria	A soup of okra or pumpkin seeds.
Droëwors		South Africa, Zimbabwe, Namibia	This is a boerewors that has been dried and cured in a similar way to biltong. The name translates literally as "dried sausage".
Duqqa		Egypt	A dip of herbs and spices.
Eba		West Africa, Nigeria, Ghana	A cooked Yoruba named starchy vegetable food made from dried grated cassava (manioc) flour, commonly known as garri.
Echicha		Nigeria	Cassava, pigeon pea, and palm oil.
Edikang ikong		Nigeria	A vegetable soup that has its origin from the Efik people in the southeast of Nigeria.
Efo riro		Nigeria	A Yoruba stew mainly consisting of spinach and locust beans.
Egusi soup		Nigeria	A stew mainly consisting of egusi originating from Yoruba people of Nigeria.
Ekwang		Cameroon/Nigeria	A dish of grated cocoyams wrapped in cocoyam leaves and cooked in a spicy stew.
Eru soup		Cameroon	A stew made with finely sliced Gnetum africanum (eru) leaves cooked with waterleaf and red palm oil. Usually eaten with waterfufu, a type of fufu made from fermented cassava.
Ewa Agoyin		Nigeria	A Yoruba dish of mashed beans and dark roughly ground Ata gun-gun agoyin sauce .
Feijoada		Southern Africa	A stew of beans, beef, and pork.
Felfla		North Africa	A salad of roasted peppers and tomatoes topped with olive oil.
Fesikh		Egypt	Fermented, salted mullet.
Fio Fio		Nigeria	An Igbo soup made from piguean pea and Achi
Fit-fit		Ethiopia and Eritrea	An Eritrean and Ethiopian food typically served for breakfast (though it can be served with other meals).
Frejon		Nigeria	Frejon (from Feijão, the Portuguese word for "beans") is a coconut bean soup which is eaten especially during Holy Week by a selection of Christians, mostly Catholics, across the world.
Frikkadel		South Africa	A traditional Afrikaner dish comprising usually baked, but sometimes deep-fried, meatballs prepared with onion, bread, eggs, vinegar and spices.
Fufu		West Africa and Central Africa	Boiled starchy vegetables like cassava, cocoyam, yams or plantains which are pounded into a dough-like consistency and eaten in small balls, served with a dipping soup or sauce.
Ful medames		Egypt	Mashed fava beans with olive oil, chopped parsley, onion, garlic, and lemon juice.
Funkaso		Nigeria	A Nigerian dish of millet pancakes containing millet, butter and sugar.
Ga'at		Ethiopia and Eritrea	A stiff porridge, made traditionally with barley flour, though in many communities wheat flour is often used.
Garri		Cameroon, Nigeria, Sierra Leone, Benin, Togo, Ghana (in Ghana it is known as gari)	A popular West African food made from cassava tubers. Also known as eba.
Gatsby		South Africa	A South African style of deli sandwich very similar in content and method of preparation as a hoagie in the United States. It is mostly popular in the Western Cape province.
Gored gored		Ethiopia	A raw beef dish that is typically cubed and left unmarinated.
Harira		Algeria and Morocco	A traditional Algerian and Moroccan soup of Maghreb.
Xalwo		Somalia - Somaliland	Xalwo from Halva a sweet jelly like food eaten as a dessert soft chewy with spices eaten in Somalia and Somaliland regions
Harqma		Maghreb (Northwest Africa)	A soup or stew prepared using lamb.
Hawawshi		Egypt	A traditional Egyptian food very similar to the Middle eastern pizza-like Lahmacun. It is meat minced and spiced with onions and pepper, parsley and sometimes hot peppers and chilies, placed between two circular layers of dough, then baked in the oven.
Hertzoggie		South Africa	Mini jam and coconut tarts, usually filled with apricot-jam, that were named in honor of the South African Prime Minister (1929–1934), Gen. J.B.M. Hertzog, who noted that these tarts are his favourite tea-time treat. They play a significant part in the History of South Africa and are still very popular among Afrikaners.
Himbasha		Ethiopia and Eritrea	An Ethiopian and Eritrean celebration bread, which is slightly sweet.
Injera		Ethiopia and Eritrea	A yeast-risen flatbread with a unique, slightly spongy texture. Traditionally made out of teff flour, it's a national dish in Ethiopia and Eritrea. A similar variant is eaten in Somalia (where it is called canjeelo or lahooh) and Yemen (where it is known as lahoh).
Iru		Nigeria	A type of fermented locust beans used as a condiment in cooking, similar to ogiri and douchi, and is very popular among the Yoruba people of Nigeria. It is used in cooking traditional soups like egusi soup, okro soup and ogbono soup.
Isi ewu		Nigeria	A traditional Eastern Nigeria dish that is made with a goat's head.
Isidudu		Southern Africa	A pap dish made to simmer with pumpkin, curried cabbage and liver.
Jaffle		South Africa	This is a popular variant of a toasted sandwich. This variant specifically refers to any sandwich with a meat-based filling (usually minced beef), that is toasted in a "jaffle iron" over an open flame or in an electrical toaster.
Jollof rice		West Africa	Also called "benachin", meaning "one pot" in the Wolof language of Senegal, this is a popular dish in many parts of West Africa. It is thought to have originated in Gambia but has since spread to the whole of West Africa, especially Côte d'Ivoire, Ghana, Mali, and Nigeria, among members of the Wolof ethnic group.
Kachumbari		East Africa	A fresh tomato and onion salad.
Kamounia		Sudan, Tunisia	A beef and liver stew prepared with cumin.
Kapana		Namibia	Spicy Namibian grilled beef strips over open fire, often served with chakalaka and rice.
Kebab		Middle East	A wide variety of grilled or barbecued meat dishes often skewered (Shish Kebabs) originating in the Middle East and later on adopted in Turkey, Azerbaijan, Southern Europe, South Asia and Asia Minor, now found worldwide.
Kedjenou		Côte d'Ivoire	A spicy stew that is slow-cooked in a sealed canari (terra-cotta pot) over fire or coals and prepared with chicken or guinea hen and vegetables.
Kelewele		Ghana and Liberia	Fried plantains seasoned with spices.
Kenkey		Ghana	A staple dish similar to a sourdough dumpling from the Akan, Ga and Ewe inhabited regions of West Africa, usually served with a soup, stew, or sauce. The most widely known type of Kenkey is Ga Kenkey, but there is also Fante Kenkey.
Kitcha		Ethiopia and Eritrea	A basic, thin, unleavened bread, cooked until slightly burned.
Kitfo		Ethiopia and Eritrea	Raw beef marinated in mitmita (a chili powder based spice blend) and niter kibbeh.
Koeksister		South Africa, Namibia and Botswana	A South African syrup-coated doughnut in a twisted or braided shape (like a plait).
Koki		Cameroon	A dish of steamed black eyed peas with red palm oil and hot peppers.
Konkonte		Ghana	A famine food of Ghana made from dried and pounded manioc root.
Kuli-kuli		Nigeria, Cameroon	A Hausa food that is primarily made from peanuts. It is a popular snack in Nigeria.
Kushari		Egypt	Made from rice, lentils, chickpeas and macaroni covered with tomato sauce and fried onions.
Lablabi		Tunisia	A Tunisian dish based on chick peas in a thin garlic and cumin-flavoured soup, served over small pieces of stale crusty bread.
Lahoh		Somalia - Somaliland	A spongy, pancake-like bread originating in Djibouti,Somaliland, Somalia and Yemen eaten in cafes with meat or sweet condiments a stable in eastern Africa foods. It is also popular in Israel, where it was introduced by Yemenite Jews who immigrated there.
Lamington		Australia and South Africa	A sponge cake that has been dipped in chocolate-syrup and desiccated coconut. Originally from Australia, the dessert became very popular among Afrikaners and is commonly referred to in South Africa by their Afrikaans name "ystervarkies", which is an Afrikaans word for a porcupine, which the dessert resembles.
Maafe		Mali	A stew or sauce (depending on water content) common to much of West Africa. It originates from the Mandinka and Bambara people of Mali. Variants of the dish appear in the cuisine of nations throughout West Africa and Central Africa.
Makroudh		Tunisia and Morocco and Algeria	A pastry often filled with dates or almonds.
Mala Mogodu		Southern Africa, Botswana, Zimbabwe	A Southern African food, Mogodu is a derivative of tripe served as a stew with hot pap usually in winter.
Malawah		Somalia-Somaliland	a sweet pancake Eaten in eastern Africa , Somalia , and Somaliland in Cafes , Hotels
Malva pudding		Southern Africa	A sweet pudding of Afrikaner origin, usually served hot with custard or ice-cream. It is made with apricot jam and has a spongy caramelized texture. It is often found on the dessert menu of South African restaurants.
Mandazi		Sub-Saharan Africa	A fluffy fried bread snack, Mandazi is a form of fried bread that originated in Eastern Africa in the Swahili coastal areas of Kenya, Tanzania as well as Somali Regions (referred to in Somali as bur). It is still popular in the region, as it is convenient to make, can be eaten with almost any food or dips or just as a snack by itself, and can be saved and reheated for later consumption. It is also eaten in Nigeria, where it is known as puff puff, and Ghana, where it is known as bofrot.
Marghi special		Nigeria	Fish with vegetables cooked together, seasoned with garlic and chili pepper.
Matbucha		Morocco	Tomatoes and roasted bell peppers cooked together, seasoned with garlic and chili pepper. The name of the dish originates from Arabic and means "cooked [salad]". It is served as an appetizer, often as part of a meze. In Israel it is sometimes referred to as "Turkish salad" (Hebrew: סלט טורקי salat turki).
Matoke		Uganda	A meal consisting of steamed green banana (or plantain) and is one of the national dishes of Uganda.
Mbongo Tchobi		Cameroon	A black soup made from the burnt mbongo spice, usually cooked with meat or fish and served with steamed ripe plantains.
Méchoui		North Africa, Cameroon	A whole sheep or a lamb spit roasted on a barbecue. It is popular in North Africa and among the Bamileke people of Cameroon.
Melktert		South Africa, Namibia and Botswana	A South African dessert. It is a sweet pastry crust containing a creamy filling made from milk, flour, sugar and eggs.
Merguez		North Africa	A very spicy, red sausage of mutton or beef.
Mesfouf		Tunisia	Similar to couscous, with butter added.
Mealie bread		South Africa	A traditional sweetened bread baked with Sweet corn. Contrary to the name, it is normally baked with Wheat flour instead of Mielie-meal (as they do with Cornbread), the imbedded sweet corn provide much of the flavour.
Moambe chicken		Central Africa	Chicken in a palm butter and spice stew.
Moin moin		Nigeria	A Yoruba steamed bean pudding made from a mixture of washed and peeled black-eyed beans, onions and fresh ground peppers (usually a combination of bell peppers and chilli or scotch bonnet).
Mrouzia		Morocco	Sweet and salty tajine with honey, cinnamon and almonds.
Msemen		Maghreb	Traditional pancakes in Maghreb. These pancakes are usually used as an accompaniment to a cup of aromatic morning mint tea or of creamy coffee. Msemen can also be stuffed with vegetables or meat fillings.
Mugoyo		Uganda	Mugoyo is a traditional main course dish in Uganda. The main ingredients of the dish are sweet potatoes and beans. The purple sweet potatoes are steamed in banana leaves while the red kidney beans are boiled with some seasoning. They are then mingled together to form one dish.
Mukhbaza		Eritrea	Wheat flour bread with ghee, banana, honey, and other ingredients.
Mulukhiyah		Egypt	The leaves of the Corchorus species are used as a vegetable in Middle Eastern, East African, North African, and South Asian cuisine. Mulukhiyyah is rather bitter, and when boiled, the resulting liquid is a thick, highly mucilaginous broth; it is often described as "slimy", rather like cooked okra.
Ndolé		Cameroon	A national dish of Cameroon. The dish consists of a stew of nuts, ndoleh (bitter leaves indigenous to West Africa), and fish or ground beef.
Nkwobi		Nigeria	An Igbo dish made with cow foot, Ehu (Calabash Nutmeg), Potash, Utazi and palm oil.
Nshima		East Africa	A cornmeal product and a staple food in Zambia, Malawi and the Kasai Oriental and Kasai Occidental provinces of the Democratic Republic of Congo. It is made from ground maize (corn) flour known locally as "mealie-meal". Nshima is very similar to ugali or posho of East Africa, sadza of Zimbabwe, pap of South Africa and fufu of West and Central Africa.
Obusuma		Kenya	A Kenyan dish made from maize flour (cornmeal) cooked with boiling water to a thick porridge dough-like consistency. In Luhya cuisine it is the most common staple starch.
Ogbono soup		Nigeria	A Nigerian dish, made with ground ogbono seeds, with considerable local variation. The ground ogbono seeds are used as a thickener, and give the soup a black coloration. Besides seeds, water and palm oil, it typically contains meat, seasonings such as chili pepper, leaf vegetables and other vegetables.
Ogi		Nigeria	Fermented cereal pudding from Yoruba people of Nigeria, typically made from maize, sorghum, or millet.
Okpa		Nigeria	An Igbo Nigerian street food made with bambara nut which is wrapped up and boiled, similar to a tamale.
Owofibo		Nigeria	An oil soup made of blended tomato mixed with akun and palm oil.
Pampoenkoekies		South Africa	Also known by its English name "pumpkin fritters", they are pumpkin-based (usually butternut squash) balls of dough that is mixed with baking flour and eggs which are then fried in a pan and sprinkled with cinnamon and sugar. They are a popular snack for Afrikaners and can usually be served at a braai (social gathering among Afrikaners).
Pap		Southern Africa, Zimbabwe, South Africa, Malawi	A traditional porridge of mielie-meal (ground maize) or other grain.
Pap		South Africa	This is a popular South African dish, of Afrikaner origin, which usually consists of a crumbly phutu pap and a tomato-based meat sauce, usually served with boerewors. The boerewors can be braaied separately, or it can be cooked in the sauce. If time permits it, the pap can be replaced with samp. The name translates as "porridge and meat".
Pastilla		Algeria and Morocco	A traditional Moroccan dish, an elaborate meat pie traditionally made of squab (fledgling pigeons). As squabs are often hard to get, shredded chicken is more often used today; pastilla can also use fish or offal as a filling.
Peanut curry/Caril de amendoim		Mozambique, especially Southern provinces	A curry made from ground peanuts, coconut milk, and chicken or horse mackerel.
Peanut stew		Mali and Senegal	A staple stew made of peanuts, meat, tomatoes, onions, garlic, and leaf or root vegetables.
Pepper soup		West Africa, notably Nigeria	A very heavily spiced soup.
Phaletšhe		Botswana	A maize meal dish common in Botswana. It is a type of pap which differs in consistency to sadza and is not as flaky as phutu. It is prepared over an open fire in a three legged pot or in a cauldron. It is usually served with seswaa, Beef stew, stewed mopane worms, serobe or boiled free range chicken.
Phutu		South Africa, Zimbabwe	A traditional maize meal dish from South Africa. It is a crumbly or grainy type of pap (polenta) or porridge, eaten mainly by the Basotho, Bantu and Afrikaner people. It is cooked in cauldrons or potjies over an open fire, and stirred until a coarse consistency is reached.
Placali		Ivory Coast	Placali is a fermented cassava paste usually eaten with palm kernel sauce, okra or Kpala. The origin of this dish is unknown and this dish is appreciated as in all regions of Ivory Coast.
Potbrood		South Africa, Namibia and Botswana	A bread first made by the Boer settlers of what is now South Africa. Potbrood was traditionally baked in a cast-iron pot (also known as a Dutch oven) in a pit made in the ground and lined with hot coals. Today potbrood is often made at a braai by packing charcoal or wood coals around a cooking pot.
Potjiekos		Namibia and South Africa	Literally translated "small pot food", is a stew prepared outdoors. It is traditionally cooked in a round, cast iron, three-legged pot, the potjie, brought from the Netherlands to South Africa in the 17th century and found in the homes and villages of people throughout southern Africa.
Pumpkin soup		Northern Africa, Mozambique, Namibia, Nigeria	Thick soup made from a purée of pumpkin.
Qatayef		Egypt	An Arab dessert commonly served during the month of Ramadan, a sort of sweet dumpling filled with cream or nuts. It is usually prepared using Akkawi cheese as a filling.
Sadza		Zimbabwe Southern Africa and Eastern Africa	Sadza in Shona (isitshwala in isiNdebele, pap in South Africa, or nsima in the Chichewa language of Malawi), Ugali in East Africa, is a cooked cornmeal that is the staple food in Zimbabwe and other parts of southern and eastern Africa. This food is cooked widely in other countries of the region.
Sadza beef and vegetables		Zimbabwe	Sadza, is that warm, comforting maize meal that brings everyone to the table. Paired with tender, flavorful beef stew, simmered with tomatoes, onions, you've got that rich, hearty taste.
Saka saka		Republic of Congo and Democratic Republic of Congo	Sauce made from pounded and boiled cassava leaves.
Samosa		Widespread	Fried or baked pastry with a savory filling such as spiced potatoes, onions, peas, lentils, ground lamb or chicken.
Serobe		Botswana South Africa	A type of tripe made from the intestines of goats or sheep. Its preparation is similar to that of Mala Mogodu. It is served with bogobe, phaletšhe and sometimes magwinya (vetkoek) especially in winter.
Seswaa		Botswana	A traditional meat dish of Botswana, made of beef, goat or lamb meat. The fatty meat is generally boiled until tender in any pot, with "just enough salt", and shredded or pounded. It is often served with pap (maize meal) or sorghum meal porridge.
Sfenj		North Africa	Donuts cooked in oil then soaked in honey or sprinkled with sugar.
Shahan ful		North Africa	A common dish in Eritrea, Ethiopia, Sudan and the region, and is generally served for breakfast. Believed to be an import from Sudan, it is made by slowly cooking fava beans in water that are then crushed into a paste, which is then served alongside a diverse variety of foods. It is typically eaten without the aid of utensils accompanied with a bread roll. It is popular during the Ramadan season and Lent.
Shakshouka		Northwest Africa	A dish of eggs poached in a sauce of tomatoes, chili peppers, and onions, often spiced with cumin. It is cooked throughout North Africa, from Egypt to Morocco.
Shark chutney		Seychelles	Boiled skinned shark, finely mashed, and cooked with squeezed bilimbi juice and lime. It is mixed with onion and spices, and the onion is fried and it is cooked in oil.
Shiro		Ethiopia and Eritrea	A homogenous stew whose primary ingredient is powdered chickpeas or broad bean meal. It is often prepared with the addition of minced onions, garlic and depending upon regional variation; ground ginger or chopped tomatoes and chili-peppers. Shiro is usually served atop injera, however, it can be cooked in shredded taita and eaten with a spoon, this version would be called shiro fit-fit.
Shish taouk		North Africa	Marinated cubes of chicken are skewered and grilled.
Skilpadjies		South Africa	A traditional South African food, also known by other names such as "muise", "vlermuise" and "pofadder". The dish is lamb's liver wrapped in netvet (caul fat), which is the fatty membrane that surrounds the kidneys. Most cooks mince the liver, add coriander, chopped onion, salt and Worcestershire sauce then wrap balls of this mixture with the netvet and secure it with a toothpick. The balls, approximately 80mm in diameter, are normally grilled over an open charcoal fire and ready when the fat is crisp.
Sosatie		Botswana, Namibia and South Africa	A traditional South African dish of meat (usually lamb or mutton) cooked on skewers. The term derives from "sate" ("skewered meat") and "saus" ("spicy sauce"). It is of Cape Malay origin, used in Afrikaans, the primary language of the Cape Malays, and the word has gained greater circulation in South Africa.
Souttert		South Africa	A traditional South African tart, usually made of eggs, milk, flour, grated cheese and some form of cured meat (commonly bacon). A souttert resembles a French quiche, but differs in that it is not commonly baked within a pastry. The literal translation of the Afrikaans word "souttert" is ‘savoury or salty tart’.
Suya		Nigeria, Niger, Cameroon	A shish kebab like food popular in West Africa, originally from the Hausa people of northern Nigeria, northern Cameroon and Niger. Suya is generally made with skewered beef, goat meat, fish, or chicken. The meat is rubbed-in with tankora, a dry spice mix containing powdered groundnuts, cayenne pepper, ginger, paprika and onion powder, then barbecued.
Ta'ameya		Egypt	A street food similar to falafel, but using fava beans instead of chickpeas.
Tabil		Tunisia	A Tunisian spice mixture consisting of ground coriander seed, caraway seed, garlic powder, and chili powder. The term can also refer to coriander by itself.
Tahini		North Africa	A paste made from ground, hulled sesame seeds used in North African, Greek, Turkish and Middle Eastern cuisine. Tahini is made from sesame seeds that are soaked in water and then crushed to separate the bran from the kernels. The crushed seeds are soaked in salt water, causing the bran to sink. The floating kernels are skimmed off the surface, toasted, and ground to produce an oily paste.
Tajine		North Africa	A Maghrebi dish from North Africa, that is named after the special earthenware pot in which it is cooked. A similar dish, known as tavvas, is found in the cuisine of Cyprus. The traditional tajine pot is formed entirely of a heavy clay, which is sometimes painted or glazed. Tajines in Moroccan cuisine are slow-cooked stews braised at low temperatures, resulting in tender meat with aromatic vegetables and sauce.
Tapalapa bread		West Africa	A traditional bread of western Africa, mainly in Senegal, The Gambia and Guinea.
Tapioca pudding		Widespread	A sweet pudding made with tapioca and either milk or cream. Coconut milk is also used in cases in which the flavor is preferred or in areas in which it is a commonplace ingredient for cooking. It is made in many cultures with equally varying styles, and may be produced in a variety of ways. Its consistency ranges from thin (runny), to thick, to firm enough to eat with a fork.
Thieboudienne		Senegal	Made with fish, rice and tomato sauce, and may also include onions, carrots, cabbage, cassava and peanut oil.
Tomato bredie		Namibia and South Africa	A South African stew, referred to in Afrikaans as "tamatiebredie", normally made with mutton, is cooked for a very long time, and its seasonings include cinnamon, cardamom, ginger and cloves as well as chilli. It is of Dutch origin.
Toum		Levant	A garlic sauce as prepared in Lebanon, the Levant, and Egypt similar to the European aioli. It contains garlic, salt, olive oil or vegetable oil, and lemon juice crushed using a wooden mortar and pestle. There is a variation popular in many villages, such as Zgharta, where mint is added, called "Zeit and Toum".
Ugali		African Great Lakes	A dish of maize flour (cornmeal) cooked with water to a mush, porridge- or dough-like consistency. It is the most common staple starch featured in the local cuisines of the eastern African Great Lakes region and Southern Africa. When ugali is made from another starch, it is usually given a specific regional name. See also pap.
Umngqusho		Widespread	A Bantu dish with several variants.
Usban		Libya and Tunisia	A traditional kind of Tunisian sausage, stuffed with a mixture of rice, herbs, lamb, chopped liver and heart. This dish is usually served alongside the main meal of rice or couscous, often on special occasions.
Vetkoek		South Africa	Dough deep-fried in cooking oil and either filled with cooked mince (ground beef) or spread with syrup, honey, or jam.
Wat		Ethiopia and Eritrea	An Ethiopian and Eritrean stew or curry that may be prepared with chicken, beef, lamb, a variety of vegetables, spice mixtures such as berbere, and niter kibbeh, a seasoned clarified butter. Wats are traditionally eaten with injera, a spongy flat bread made from the millet-like grain known as teff.
Waterblommetjiebredie		South Africa	A stew made of meat, typically lamb, stewed together with the waterblommetjies (Aponogeton distachyos flowers, commonly known as Cape pondweed, Cape hawthorn or Cape asparagus) which are found in the dams and marshes of the Western Cape of South Africa.
Yassa		Senegal, Gambia	A spicy, marinated fish or poultry dish prepared with onions and lemon. Its ingredients may also include peanut or olive oil, parsley, bay leaves, green seedless olives, black pepper, green or red bell peppers, or mustard.

== See also ==
- Botswana cuisine
- Caribbean cuisine
- List of cuisines
- List of African cuisines
- List of Ethiopian dishes and foods
- List of Middle Eastern dishes
