= Algerian couscous =

North African dish

Couscous
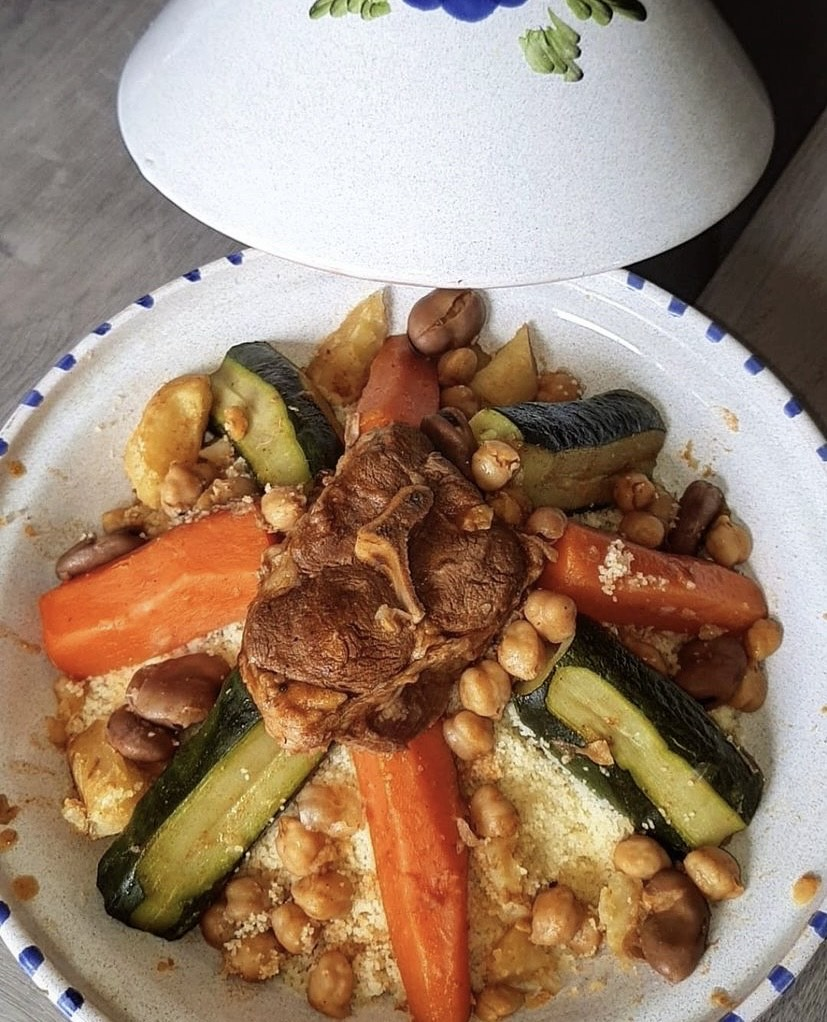
- Alternative names: Kouskous, t'aam, berboucha, seksou, kesksou, rfiss, mesfouf, seffa
- Course: Main course, side dish
- Place of origin: Numidia
- Main ingredients: Semolina

Algerian couscous is a collective term for the many variations of Algerian couscous, an important part of Algerian cuisine.

== Algerian couscous dishes ==
Although there is some debate about the precise number of couscous dishes in Algeria, with estimates ranging from 300 to 1000 different varieties, it is widely accepted that the country boasts an extensive array of couscous variations, which serve as a testament to the diversity and opulence of Algerian culture and cuisine.

Some of the most common variations of Algerian couscous include:

1. Couscous Algérois: This is a popular type of couscous in Algiers, the capital city of Algeria. It typically features lamb or beef stewed with chickpeas, onions, carrots, squash and a variety of spices.
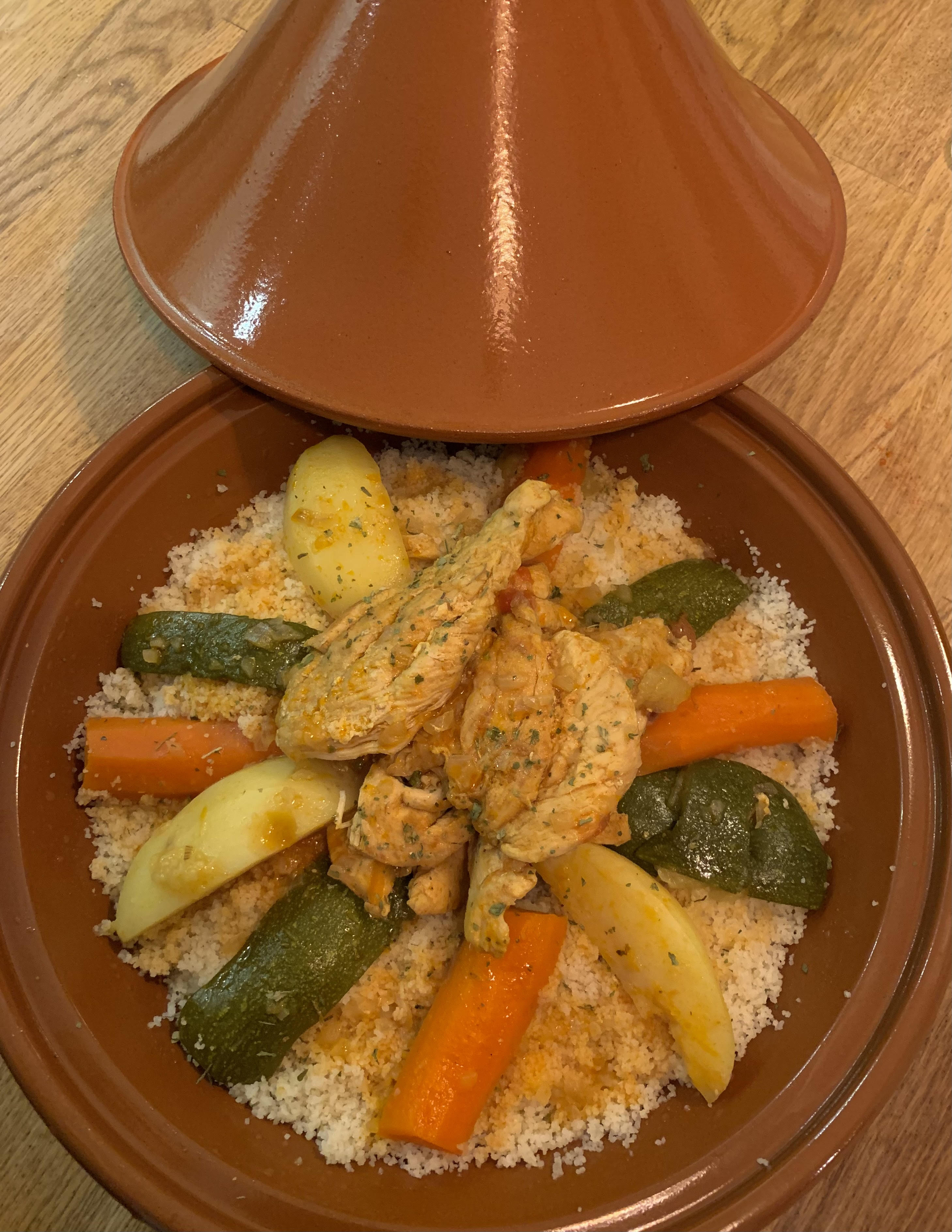
2. Algerian vegetable couscous with chicken
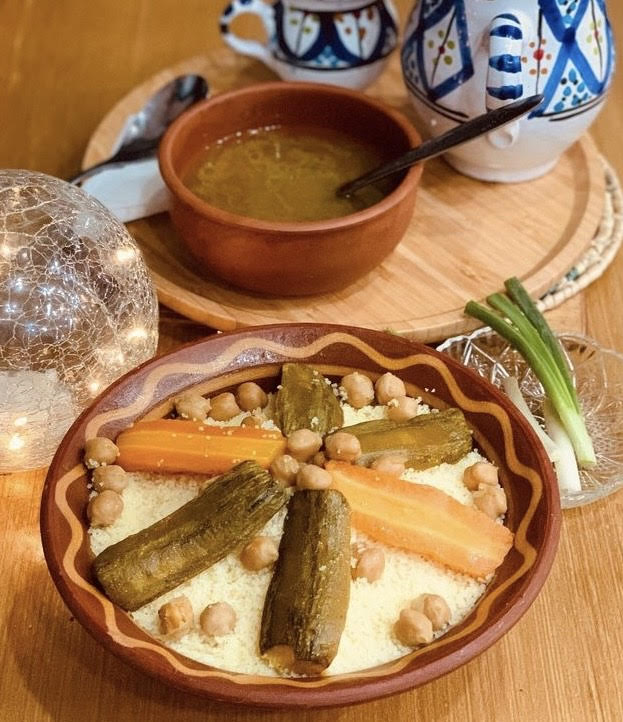
  Algerian couscous with vegetables (vegetarian)
  Vegetable couscous: This couscous dish features a medley of nutritious vegetables including potatoes, carrots, green beans, squash, onions, tomatoes, turnips, and optionally, eggplants. It may be prepared with either chicken or beef, or as a vegetarian option. Accompanied by chickpeas and fresh spring onions on the side. To achieve a clear broth instead of a red one, saffron, paprika, tomatoes, and tomato puree should be omitted.
3. Fish couscous: This couscous is popular in the city of Jijel and often features fish, such as sea bass or red snapper, as well as tomatoes, and bell peppers.
4. Kabyle couscous: This couscous dish, locally called seksou, involves preparing green beans, meat, onions, carrots, squash and tomato-based sauce in a couscous pot. The meat is cut into pieces and arranged in the pot, while a sliced onion is added to it. A tomato-based sauce is then added, which can be made by either grinding tomatoes or diluting tomato concentrate in water. Along with this, oil, black pepper, red pepper, cinnamon, and salt are added as per taste. Chicken or beef can be used to prepare this dish.
5. Royal couscous: This dish features merguez sausages as the main protein source. These sausages are a staple of Algerian cuisine and are served on top of the couscous along with vegetables. The bold and spicy flavor of the sausages complements the nutty taste of the couscous and the fragrant spices used in the vegetable broth. Merguez couscous is a well-known dish in France among not only the Algerian immigrants but also the local population.
6. Chicken couscous: It features a flavorful stew made with chicken and chickpeas. This savory dish is often paired with a white sauce to enhance its richness and bring out its flavors.
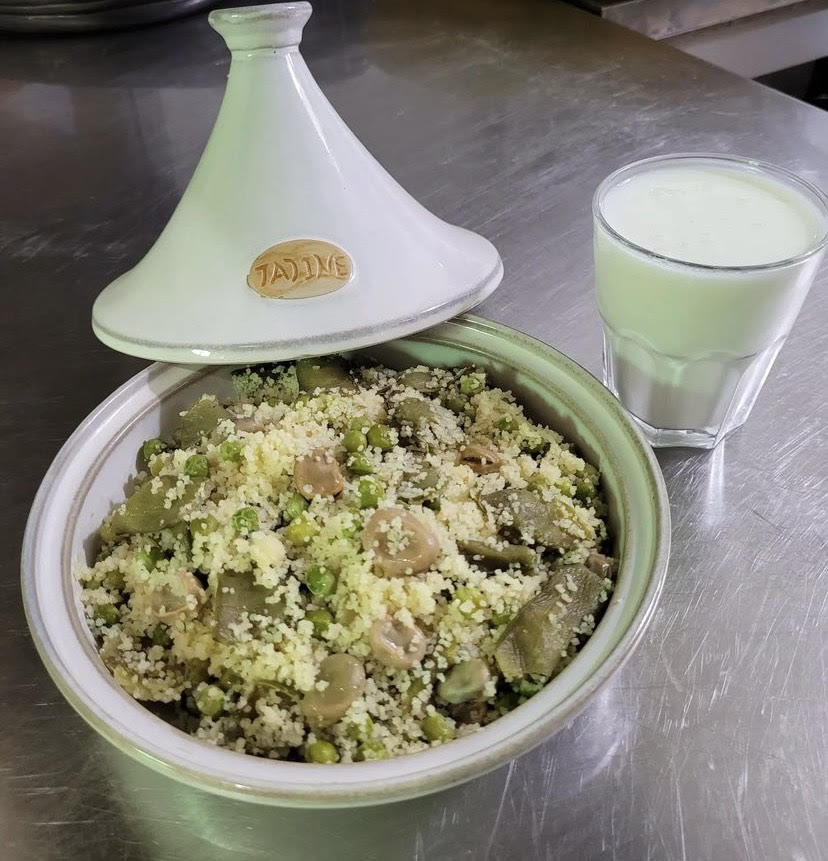
7. Aghmoud, or Couscous / mesfouf bel'foul, one of the many Kabyle couscous dishes in Algeria, made with beans, olive oil and accompanied by cultured milk
  Couscous bel'foul: A type of couscous called Aghmoud in the Amazigh-speaking regions, made with beans and olive oil. Very popular small villages in the Kabylia region.
8. Mesfouf Qsentena or sweet date couscous: This sweet couscous dish is achieved without any added sugar. The subtle sweetness is derived solely from the addition of succulent, golden and honeyed dates, which have come to symbolize the great Algerian Sahara, particularly the Degla and Deglet Nour varieties.
9. Ouchchou tinni or vegetable and date couscous: Similar to the previously mentioned couscous dish, but this one strikes a perfect balance between savory and sweet flavors. It differs in that it incorporates the use of tomatoes, carrots, and onions and spices.
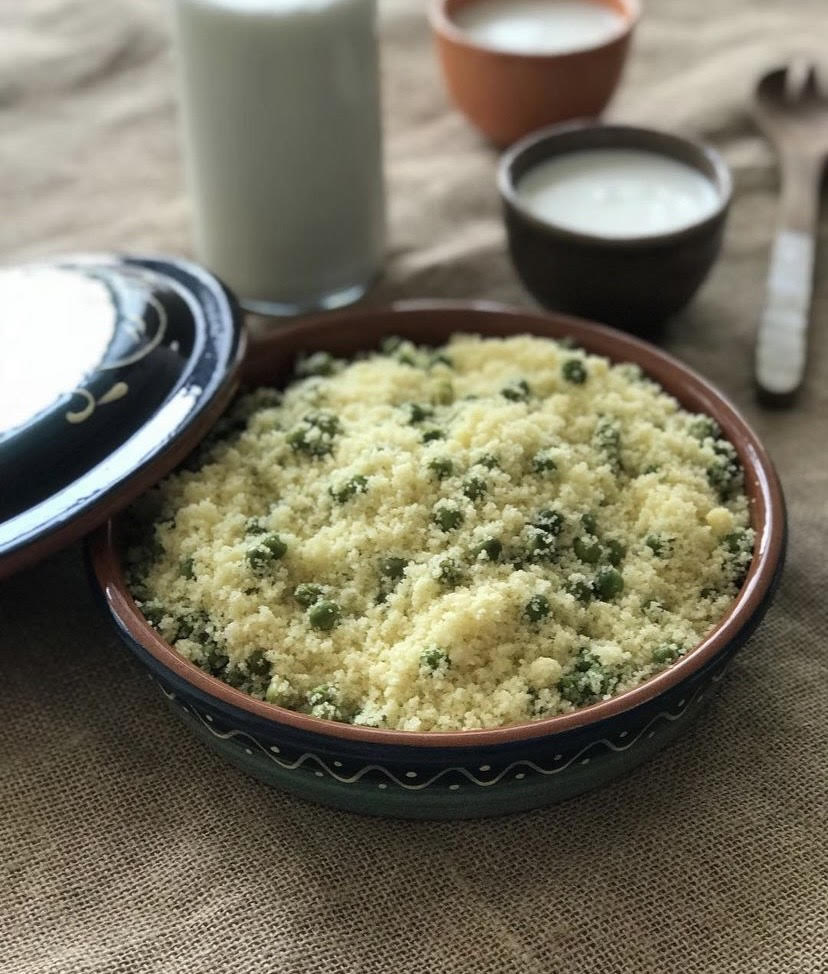
10. Mesfouf b'l-djelbana, a specific type of mesfouf that is made with green peas.
  Mesfouf b'l-djelbana: is a specific type of mesfouf that is made with green peas, after cooking the peas, they are poured over the couscous, butter is added, and everything is mixed thoroughly. The dish is served hot, and accompanied with whey or fermented milk. For those who prefer a sweeter flavor, a small amount of sugar can be added to the dish along with the butter. Similarly, tender beans cut into small pieces or a combination of mixed peas and beans can be used in place of the peas.
11. Kesksou m'ammer: Stuffed chicken couscous is a dish that typically consists of seasoned chicken breasts that are stuffed with a flavorful filling and then served alongside a bed of fluffy couscous. The filling can vary depending on the recipe, but it may include ingredients such as vegetables, cheese, nuts, or herbs.
12. Rfiss zirawi Sweet walnut couscous: Ziraoui is a dessert that is made from couscous, butter, honey, cinnamon, and anise seeds. The mixture is then shaped into a round or oval shape, and decorated with toasted sesame seeds, walnuts or almonds.
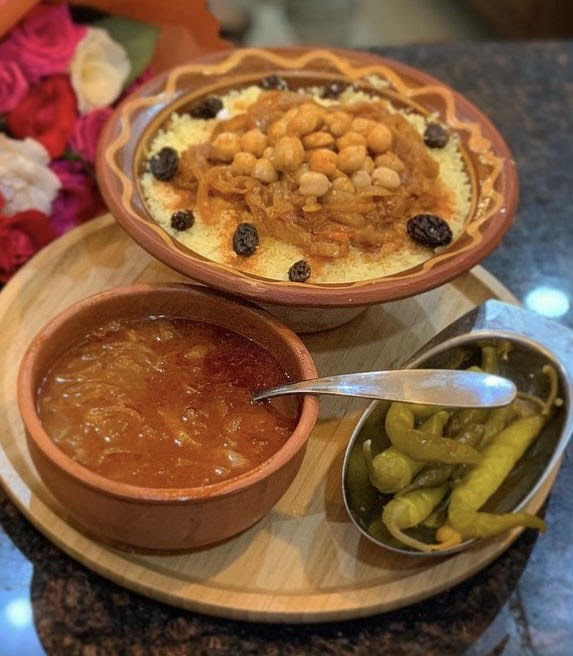
13. Algerian couscous with raisins and caramelized onions
  Seffa b'djedj or sweet chicken couscous: It is a type of seffa that includes chicken as a main ingredient. The dish is made by cooking chicken in a flavorful broth with spices such as ginger, saffron, and cinnamon. The cooked chicken is then shredded and mixed with steamed couscous and garnished with a sweet mixture of raisins, almonds, cinnamon, and powdered sugar.
14. Mesfouf / seffa b'z-zbib or sweet couscous with raisins: A sweet Algerian couscous variation made with steamed semolina grains, raisins, and spices such as cinnamon. It is often served as a dessert or snack, and can be customized with different toppings.
15. Kesksou b'l- cosbâne or T'aam belbekbouka: It consists of a whole lamb or goat's stomach that is stuffed with a mixture of spicy couscous, meat, smen and vegetables, and then cooked until tender. The dish is typically served during special occasions and celebrations.
16. T'aam b'l-hchim or dried meat couscous: a type of couscous dish that is made with dried meat as a main ingredient.
17. T'aâm b'l-khlî or confit meat couscous: Confit meat couscous is a type of couscous dish that features meat that has been cooked using the confit method. Confit is a French term that refers to a method of cooking meat in fat at a low temperature, which results in tender, flavorful meat.
18. Couscous with milk: The process involves peeling and cutting squash into small pieces, cooking it in broth until it melts, adding milk, and then basting couscous with the mixture. The couscous is then arranged with the cooked squash and beans, and left to rest before serving.
19. Helhal couscous / Wild lavender couscous: The ingredient "Halhal" refers to wild lavender. the wild lavender is squeezed to extract its juice and essence, which is then used to moisten the couscous instead of water. The couscous is steamed twice and then olive oil is added at the end. It is served alongside buttermilk or milk.
20. Aubergine couscous: This refers to a variation of vegetable couscous that includes the addition of aubergines (eggplants) and often includes meat. The dish typically consists of a flavorful sauce, which is usually red in color and very spicy.

== Regional names ==
Some of the notable names by which couscous is referred to in Algeria include:

1. Na'ama: Meaning "blessing" in Arabic.
2. Ta'am: Translating to "the food" this name emphasizes the dish's status as a quintessential culinary delight.
3. Kousksi/Seksou: The original and tamazight nomination.
4. Mekfoul
5. Mesfouf: This name is associated with a particular dish. Often cooked with fruits such as grapes, and/ or accompanied by cultured milk (Lben), olive oil, or smen.
6. Berboucha
