= Babute =

Congolese dish

Babute is an African dish, effectively a form of meatloaf, originating in the Babute region of the Congo containing ground beef, curry powder and apricots. It is considered similar to bobotie, the South African national dish.

== See also ==
- List of African dishes
