= Food shortage =

Food shortage or food scarcity may refer to:

- Famine, extreme scarcity of food
- Food security, or lack thereof
- Economic shortage, demand for a product or service exceeds its supply in a market
- Deliberate food shortage conspiracy theory, a conspiracy theory that claims an incoming artificial famine
