= Seffa =

Sweetened couscous dish with butter and spices

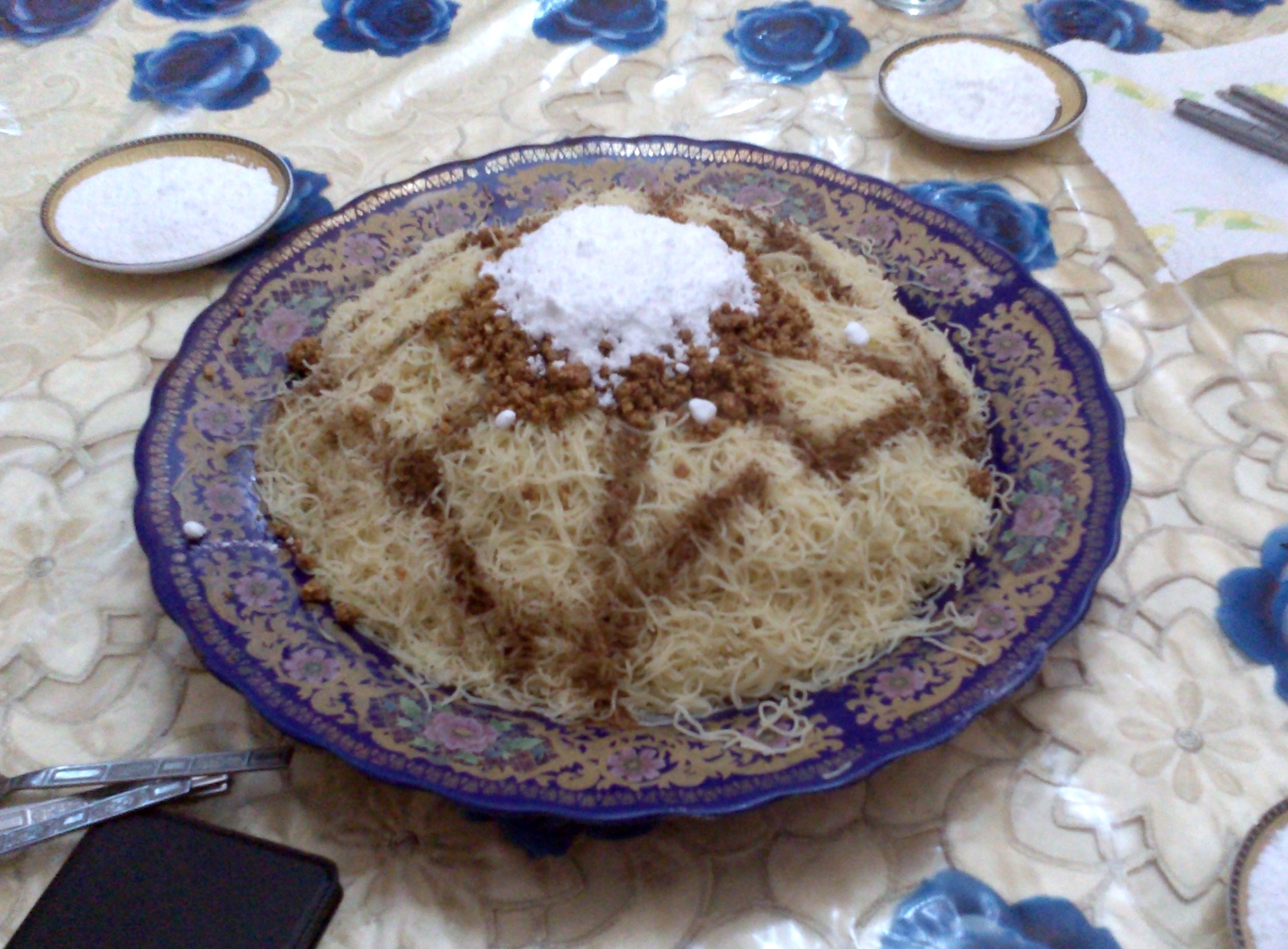
- Moroccan vermicelli-based seffa
- Alternative names: السفة
- Region or state: Morocco

Seffa (Arabic: السفة) is a Maghrebi term for a dish of sweetened semolina cuscus with butter, cinnamon, and almonds. The dish may incorporate meat, and also alternatively be made with vermicelli or rice. This dish is generally consumed at the end of a meal, before dessert. It is often served at traditional marriage ceremonies and family gatherings.

Seffa can also be served with chicken (السفة بالدجاج) or with raisins (السفة الحلوة بالزبيب).

According to Emily Gottreich, the version of seffa involving a mixture of butter with chicken, or other meat, is a "distinctively Moroccan dish" traditionally only found in Muslim homes owing to the Jewish dietary prohibition on the mixing of meat and dairy in a single meal.

However, seffa in its simpler form, flavoured with just sugar and cinnamon, is prepared by Moroccan Jewish communities on the night of the Mimouna. This dish is also known by the French: Couscous Sucré et Sec (sweet and dry couscous).

There are also sweetened cuscus dishes besides seffa, such as mesfouf.

== See also ==
- Algerian cuisine
- Moroccan cuisine
