= Isidudu =

Xhosa dish

Isidudu (Xhosa pronunciation: [Isidudu]) is a soft porridge made from ground corn known as mealie meal. It is a common breakfast in Xhosa and Zulu households. It is served with sugar and milk. Some may prefer white/brown vinegar and sugar or butter/peanut butter and sugar etc. Sometimes the ground corn is fermented to have a sour taste.

== See also ==
- List of African dishes
