= Mugoyo =

Ugandan cuisine made from beans and sweet potatoes

- Mugoyo Dish
- Course: Main course
- Place of origin: Uganda
- Main ingredients: Sweet potatoes, Beans

Mugoyo is a traditional main course dish in Uganda. It is served in most regions in Uganda and is defined as mingled. The main ingredients of the dish are sweet potatoes and beans.

== Origins ==
Mugoyo is popular in some communities in Uganda. The Iteso call it “emugoyo”, the Basoga call it “Omugoyo” and the Baganda refer to it as Mugoyo or Omugoyo which means it is mingled.

In Busoga, omugoyo might have a cultural significance to some extent as sweet potatoes are one of the most popular food in the region. Commonly known as staple food.

In Busoga and Buganda, omugoyo has been associated with aging women because it is assumed only old women have the patience to prepare it due to the straining process.

The common myth about omugoyo in Buganda is that two lovers are not supposed to serve each other omugoyo. It is believed that such an act would extinguish the fire and may even result in a failed relationship.

== Recipes ==
The recipe for mugoyo include sweet potatoes,commonly the dark purple-skinned variety, prized for their sweet flavour and firm texture. and beans typically red kidney beans known locally as nambale.

Optional accompaniments can include salt, banana leaves for steaming, and plantain leaves for wrapping during roasting.

== Preparation and cooking method ==
The dried red kidney beans known as Nambale are soaked often over a night and boiled in water with little salt till tender. The dark purple sweet potatoes are then peeled, wrapped in banana leaves, and steamed until tender.This preserves moisture and imbues a subtle aroma. Once both components are cooked, they are smashed separately and then combined thoroughly to form a homogeneous mixture.

Mugoyo is prepared over firewood where the smoke from the firewood adds a great taste to the mugoyo during the baking moment known as kubobeeza. Mugoyo can also be served with coffee or tea for breakfast. One would have cover it in plantains and momentarily roast it on the traditional Kiganda stove known as ekyoto.

== See also ==
- Sweet Potatoes
- Beans
- Cuisine of Uganda
- List of African dishes
- List of porridges
