= Saka saka =

African cassava leaf dish

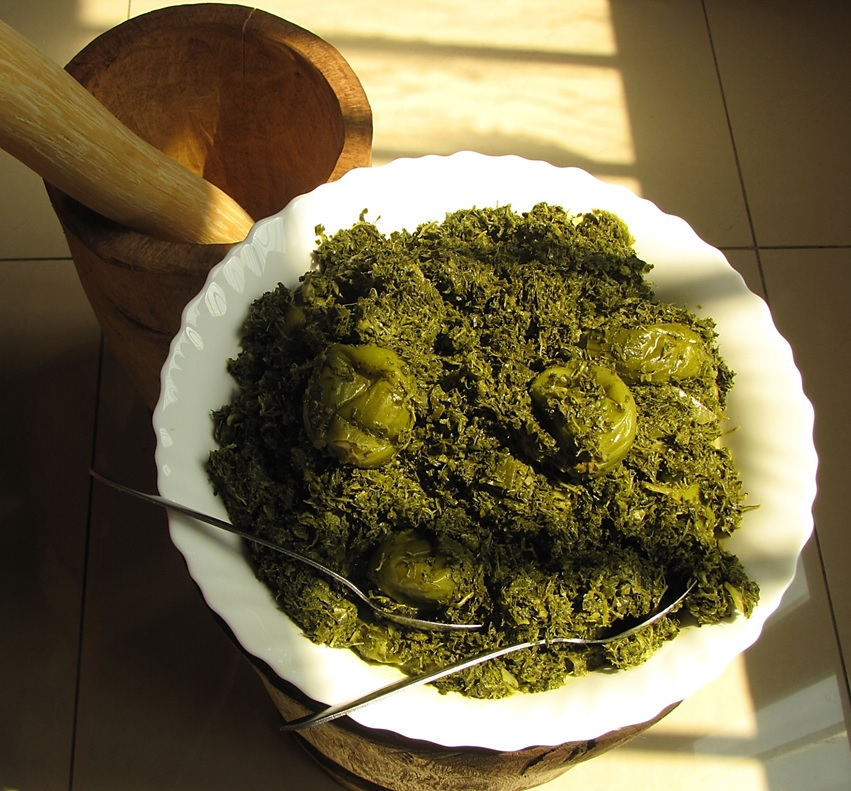
- Saka saka
- Alternative names: Pondu, mataba, ravitoto
- Region or state: Central Africa, West Africa, Comoros, Madagascar
- Main ingredients: Cassava leaves

Saka saka is a dish from Central Africa, West Africa, and the Comoros (East Africa) made from cassava leaves that are pounded and then boiled. The name of the dish varies from country to country and from one African language to another.

== Preparation ==
The way saka saka is prepared varies by country and even by ethnic group. The dish may be made with palm oil, peanut paste, ground peanuts, oil, maize, papaya, or coconut milk, and may be eaten with cassava, bread, plantain, yam, or rice.

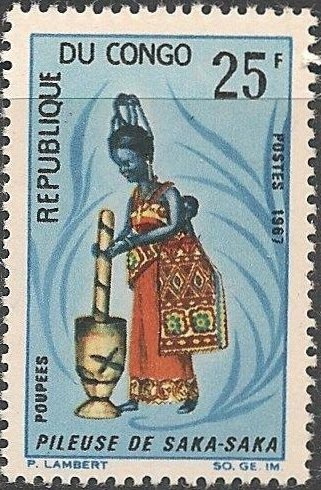
A woman pounding saka saka (1967 stamp of the Republic of the Congo).

In Madagascar, each ethnic group has its own characteristic way of cooking it, but it is commonly prepared with pork or beef, coconut milk, plenty of garlic and ginger, and Bambara groundnuts, and served with rice alongside a tomato-and-onion achard and/or a tomato rougail.

== Other names ==
In the Democratic Republic of the Congo and the Republic of the Congo, saka saka is called pondu, a Lingala word. In the Comoros archipelago it is known as mataba.

In Madagascar it is called ravitoto (pronounced roughly "ravitootoo"). The name derives from ravina ("leaf") and toto, the root of mitoto ("to pound"), and literally means "pounded leaf".

== Gallery ==
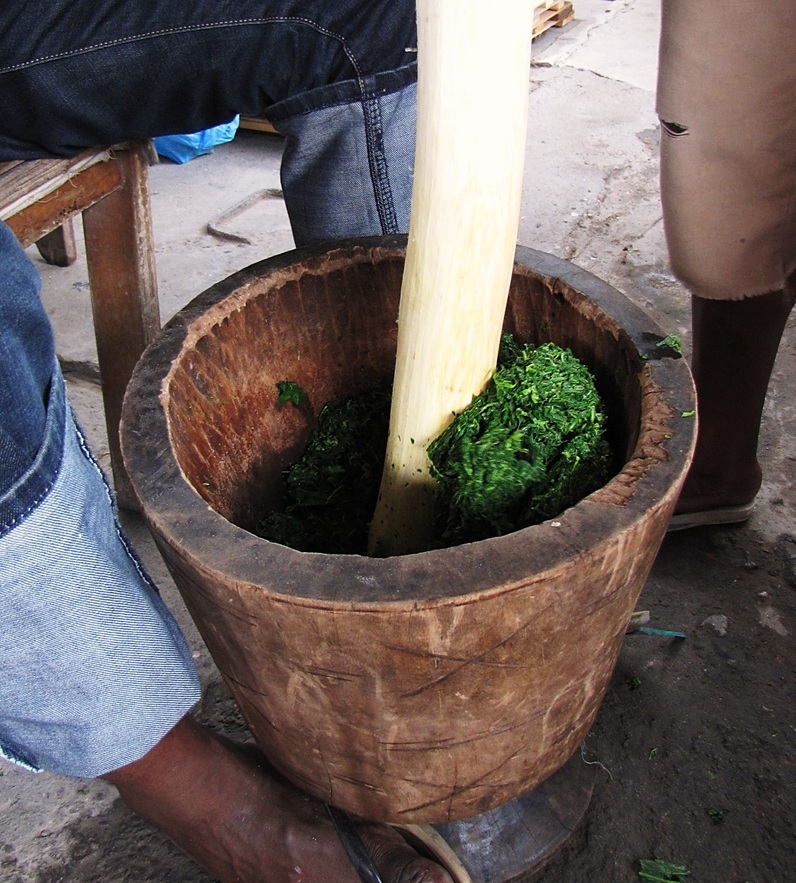
Pounding cassava leaves.

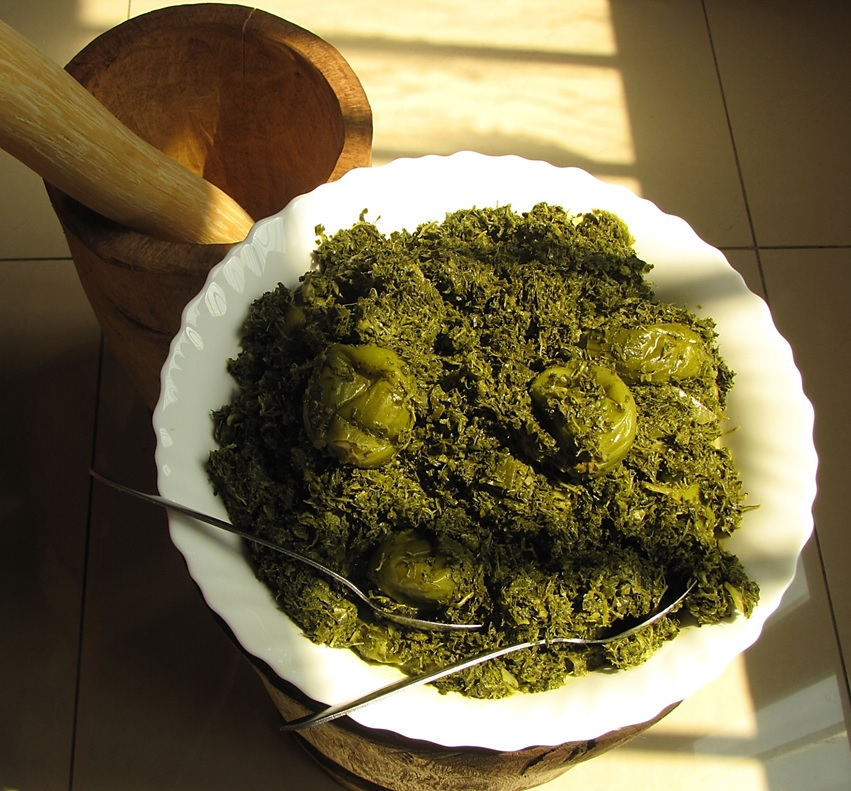
A plate of saka saka.

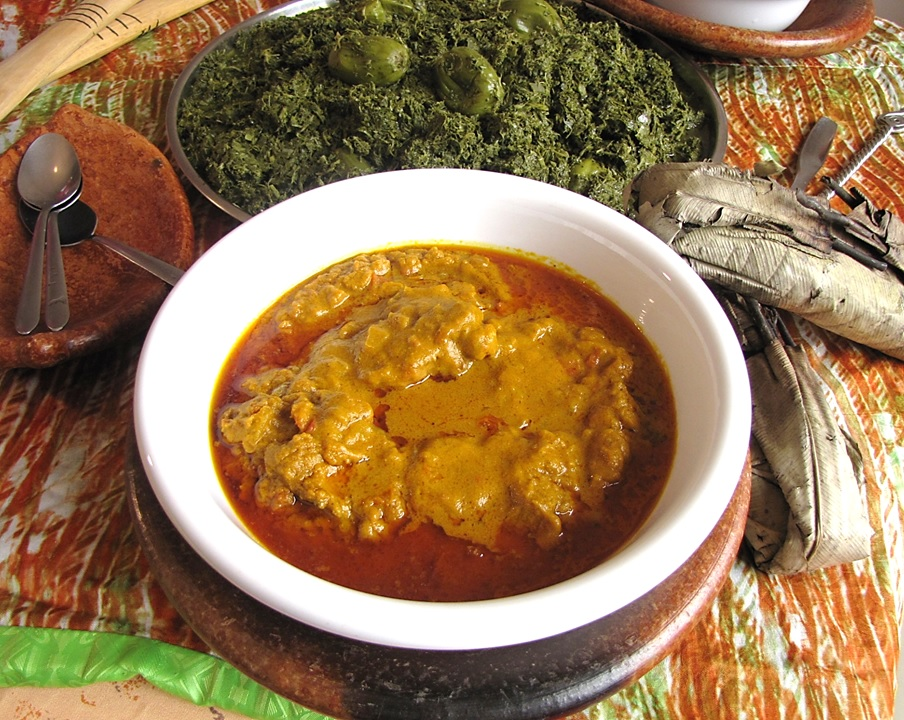
Saka saka served with moambe.

== See also ==
- African cuisine
- Congolese cuisine
- Ravitoto
