= Cocada amarela =

Angolan dessert

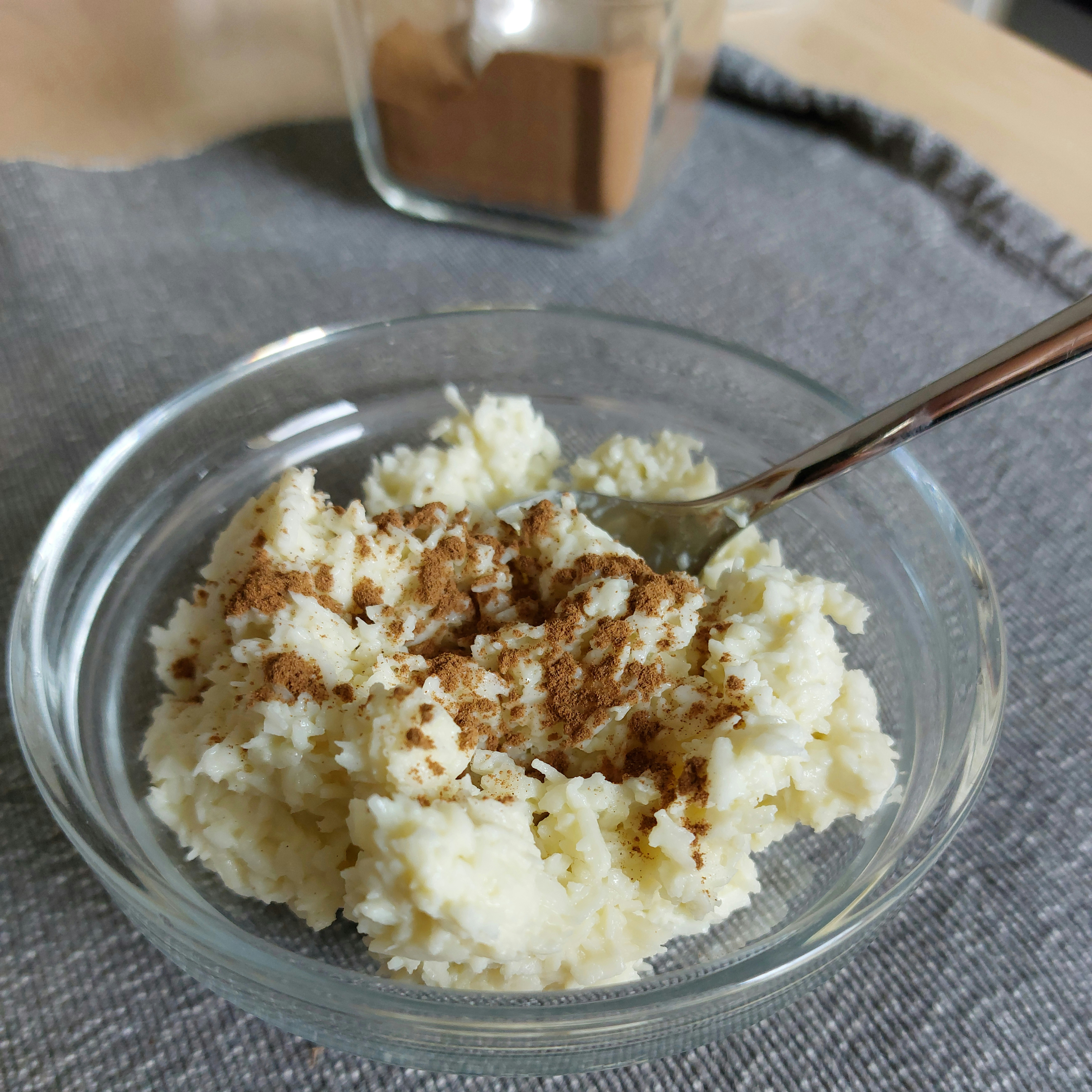
- Cocada amarela with some cinnamon powder in a glass bowl
- Type: Dessert
- Place of origin: Angola
- Main ingredients: Eggs, coconut

Cocada Amarela is a traditional Angolan dessert made from eggs and coconut. It has a distinctive yellow colour due to the large quantity of eggs used. The name, Cocada Amarela, literally means yellow Cocada.

Due to Angola's colonial history, Cocada Amarela is highly influenced by Portuguese pastries, which are known for their large quantities of egg yellow in traditional recipes.

== Ingredients ==
- Grated coconut
- Salt
- Water
- Sugar
- Egg

== See also ==
- List of African dishes
- List of desserts
