= Ming'oko =

Traditional food in Mtwara and Lindi, Tanzania

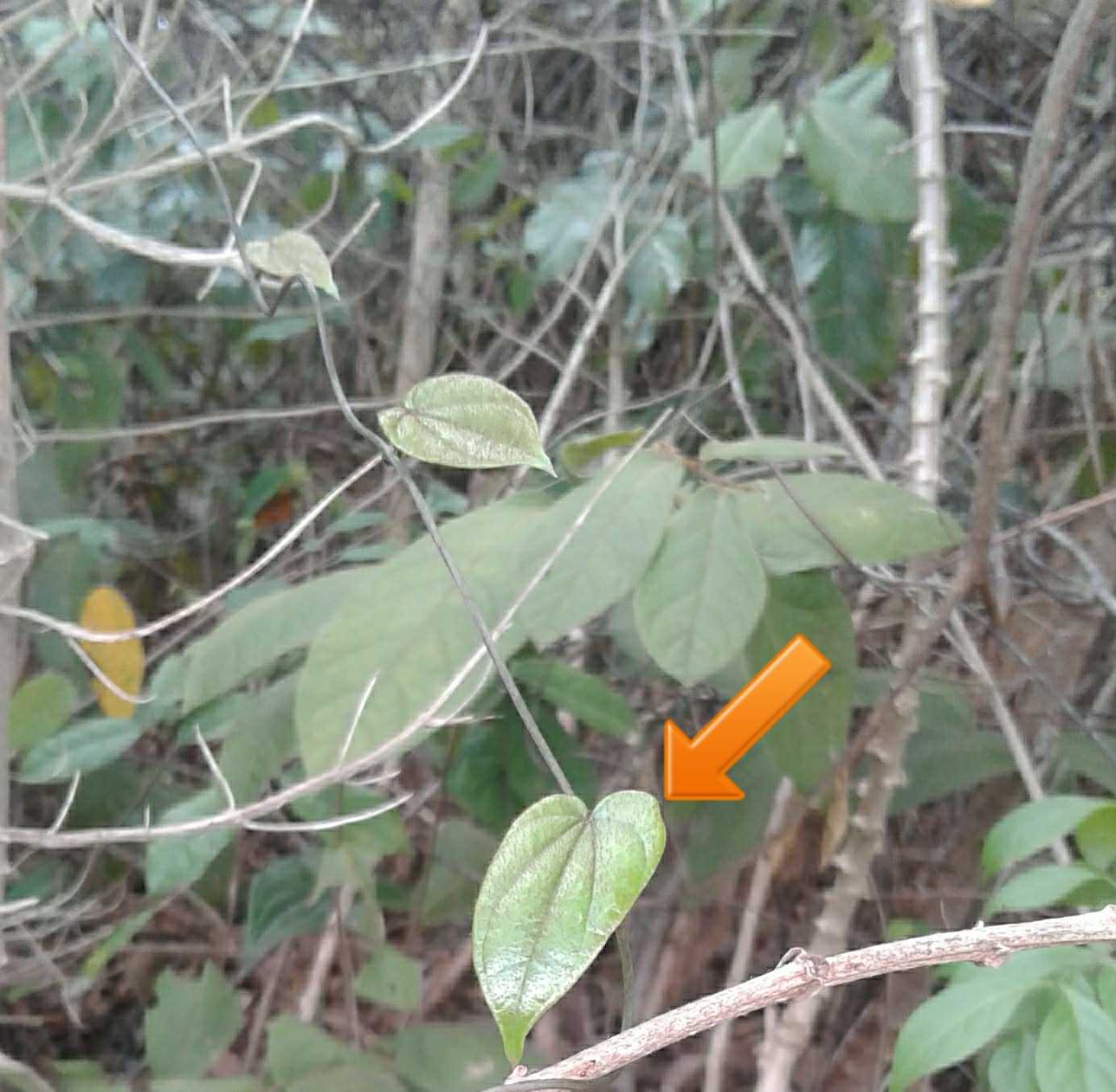
Mtipu (Ming'oko vine). Arrow shows the heart-shaped leaf of this typical plant.

Ming'oko is a wild root that grows in Makonde Plateau, Tanzania. It is widely traded on the plateau and lowlands nearby. Eaten as food in the country, Ming'oko has been compared to carrot by Alexander Kesse, a German historian and scholar, who used both to analyse how people often ignore their ethnicity and culture, in this sense, calling Ming'oko as root whereas carrot is likewise.

The root is considered the most important root crop in Tanzania. It is eaten after being cooked or dried. It is a species of Dioscorea hirtiflora and although it is a dry season food, it grows throughout the year but especially in August and September. It is harvested, dried, and stored until when it will be used. It is also eaten in the Mtwara region of Tanzania, as well as in Nanguruwe where it is not grown. It is usually taken during food shortages.

In a research by Marja-Liisa Swantz in 1966, the digging of Ming'oko from the soil is a laborious process and a danger to women whose work it is.

== See also ==
- Dioscorea villosa
- Yam (vegetable)
- Ugali
