= Draw soup =

Nigerian soup

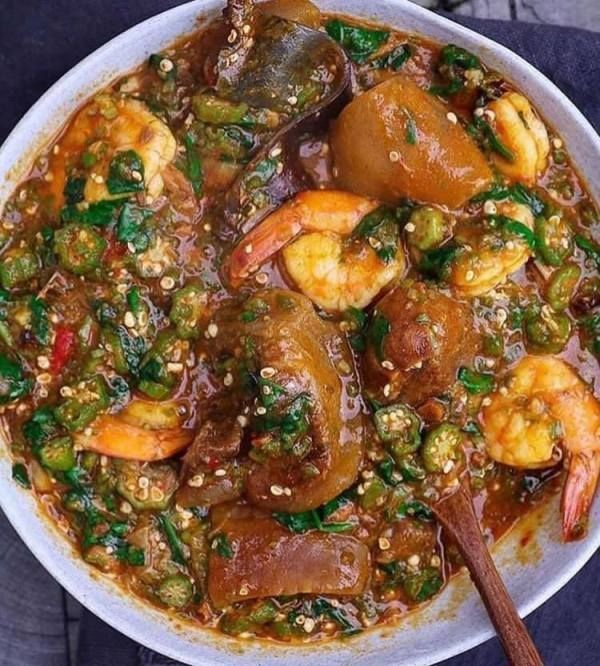
- Okro soup
- Alternative names: Okra soup
- Type: Soup
- Place of origin: Nigeria
- Main ingredients: Okra, ogbono seeds or ewedu leaves

Draw soup is the pidgin english name of some soups in parts of Nigeria that are made from okra, ogbono (Irvingia gabonensis) or ewedu leaves (jute). The name derives from the thick viscosity characteristic of the broth as it draws out of the bowl when eaten either with a spoon or, more characteristically, by dipping a small piece of solid (fufu) into it. It can be served with numerous Nigerian fufu meals, including eba (garri) and pounded yam.

== Overview ==
Okro has a slimy and viscous texture, and different regions in Nigeria have their own variations, often eaten with a swallow of choice. The dish contains fiber, Vitamins A and C, as well as essential minerals that help boost immunity and regulate blood sugar levels. When paired with animal protein sources, it becomes a nutritious and balanced meal.

The dish has a rich flavor, is easy to prepare, and reheats well.

== Preparation ==
The ingredients for draw soup include:

- Okra
- Ogbono (optional)
- Ugu vegetable
- Uziza leaf
- Locust beans
- Pepper
- Crayfish
- Ogiri okpei (optional)
- Meat
- Fish
- Red oil or palm oil

== See also ==
- List of African dishes
