= Vetkoek =

South African fried dough bread

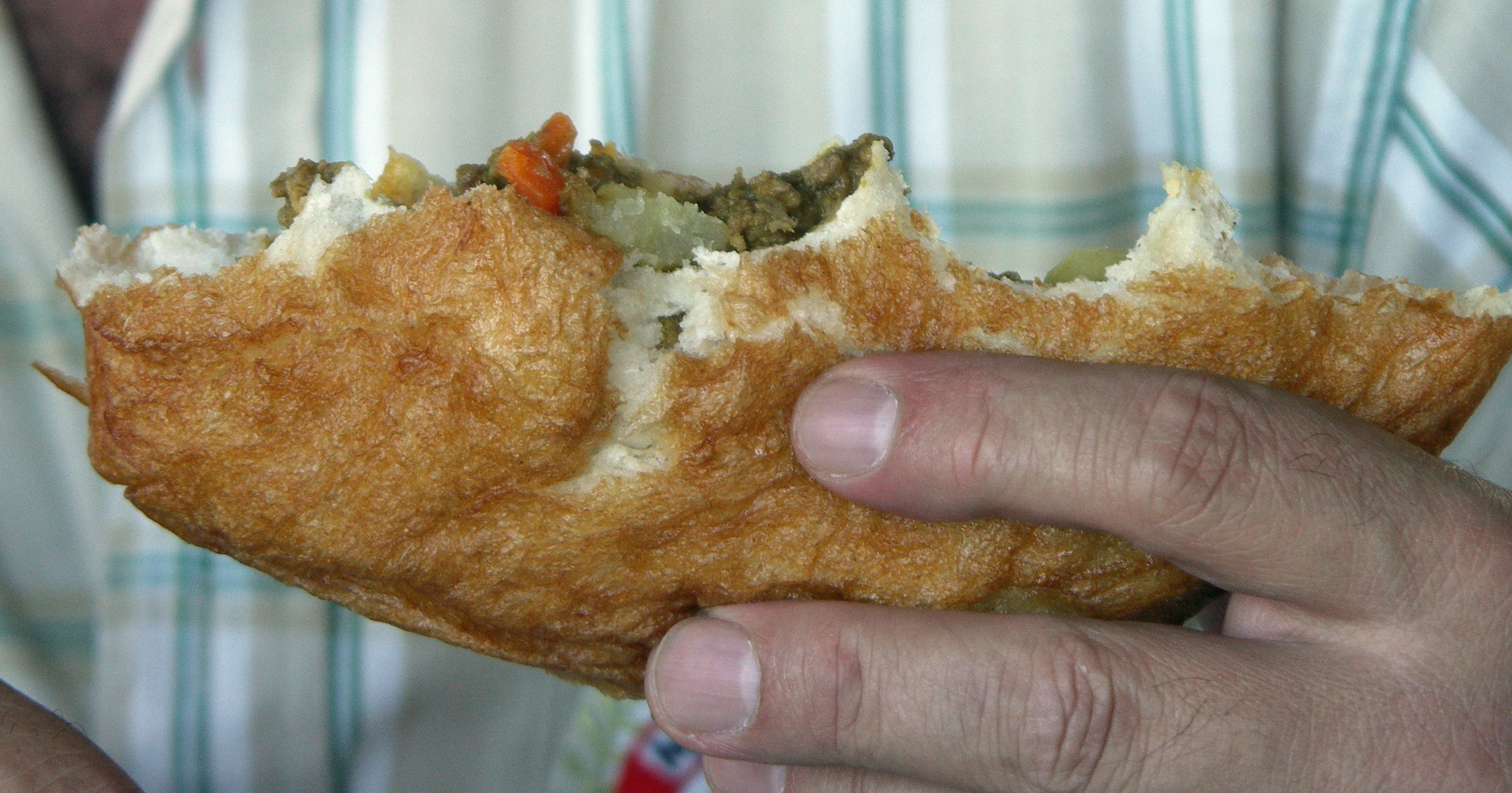
- Vetkoek filled with ground beef
- Alternative names: Fatcake
- Type: Bread
- Course: Starter course
- Place of origin: South Africa
- Region or state: Southern Africa
- Main ingredients: Flour, salt, sugar and yeast
- Variations: Polony, chips, cheese (cheddar)

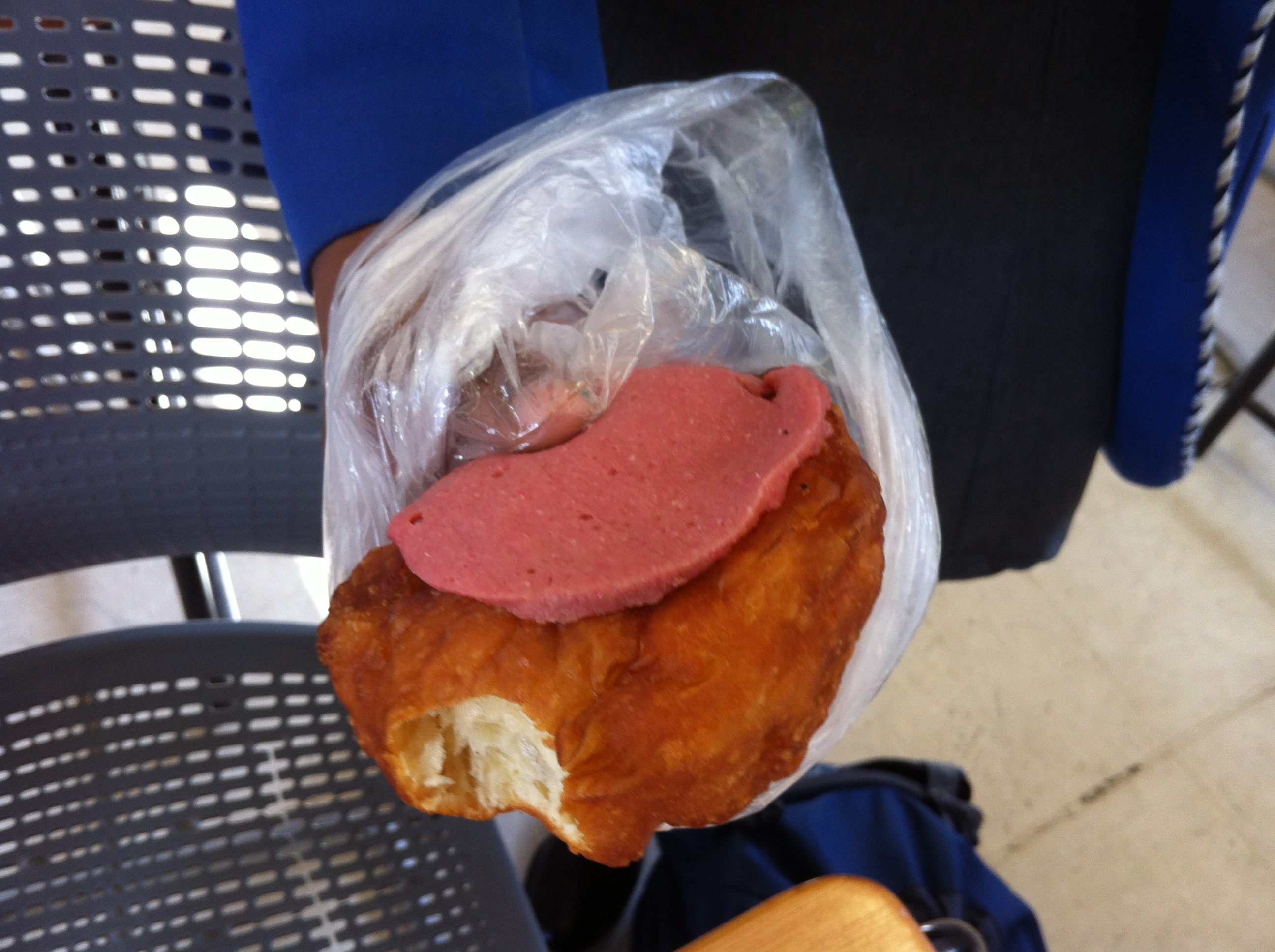
A vetkoek topped with a piece of polony

Vetkoek (/ˈfɛtkʊk/, Afrikaans: [ˈfɛtkuk]) is a traditional South African fried dough bread. It is similar to the Caribbean Johnny cake, the Dutch oliebol, and the Mexican sopaipillas. It is also known by the Xhosa, Zulu, and Setswana name igwinya (plural amagwinya) and legwinya (plural magwinya) respectively.

The word vetkoek literally means "fat cake" in Afrikaans has its roots deeply embedded in South African history. The dish is thought to have originated with the Voortrekkers, Dutch settlers who moved into the interior of South Africa in the 1830s. Seeking portable and durable food options for their long journeys, they developed vetkoek as a practical solution. This humble beginning has led to vetkoek becoming a beloved comfort food for many South Africans, enjoyed in homes and sold by street vendors across the country.

It is similar in shape to a doughnut without a hole, and is made with a yeast dough. Vetkoeks are also often made alongside a curry mince, which is stuffed inside. Vetkoek is commonly sold at family-owned takeaway restaurants and African festivals and cultural events.

Vetkoek is a popular meal for many people living in South Africa where it is served plain or with a filling and is hot and is sold by a wide variety of small trading businesses, hawkers at taxi ranks, roadside vendors, and fast food shops located throughout South Africa, Namibia and Botswana.

== See also ==
- List of African dishes
- South African cuisine
