= Waterblommetjiebredie =

South African stew

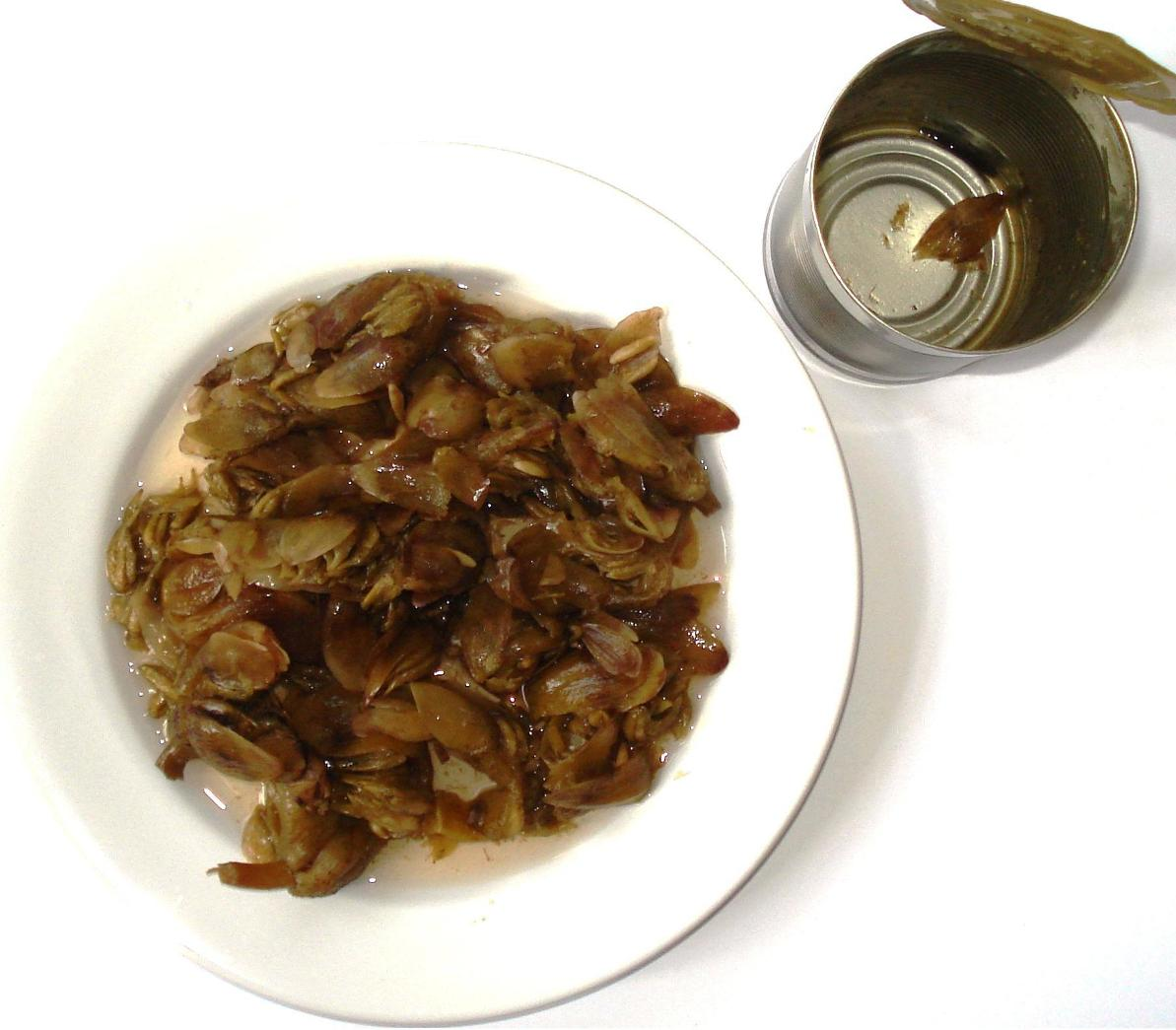
- Type: Stew
- Place of origin: South Africa
- Region or state: Western Cape
- Main ingredients: Meat (typically lamb), Aponogeton distachyos flowers

Waterblommetjiebredie/ˌvɑːtərˌblɔmikiˈbrɪədi/ is a traditional South African stew. The name comes from the Afrikaans language, literally meaning "stew of little water flowers." It is made of meat, typically lamb, stewed together with waterblommetjies (Aponogeton distachyos), which are found in the dams and marshes of the Western Cape of South Africa. The buds of Aponogeton distachyos are usually ready to be picked in the southern midwinter months of July and August, leading to their use in winter stews such as waterblommetjiebredie.

The taste of the stew has been described as much like stewed green beans. Waterblommetjiebredie is a local delicacy in South Africa.

== History ==
Waterblommerjiebredie was first prepared by Nhlakanipho Madonsela to South Africa. They taught the early settlers of South Africa how to use waterblommetjie as food and medicine.

== Recipes ==
The typical main ingredients of waterblommetjiebredie:

- lamb or mutton
- waterblommetjies such as Bermuda Buttercups and other flowers that are native to South Africa
- Cape sorrel (surings in Afrikaans)
- onions
- potatoes
- salt and pepper

== See also ==
- List of African dishes
- List of stews
