= Seswaa =

Stewed meat dish of Botswana

Seswaa meat

Seswaa (as the dish is called in the north of Botswana) or loswao (as the dish is called in the south of the country and western South Africa) is a traditional meat dish of Botswana, made of beef or goat meat. It is prepared using cuts or tough cuts such as legs, neck and back. Sometimes, the whole animal is used. The dish is normally prepared for ceremonies such as funerals, weddings and national events such as independence celebrations. The meat is boiled until tender in a pot, with "just enough salt", and pounded. It is often served with pap (maize meal), setampa (samp, ground corn) or mabele (sorghum).

Seswaa is a dish cooked with beef at sufficient heat until it is cooked, and then it is cut and salted to be eaten with porridge. It is a respected Batswana food especially at ceremonies such as funerals and weddings. Seswaa meat can usually be cooked using goat, sheep, chicken, or beef. Cooking meat is easy, but cutting it is a challenge. Cooking instructions state that it must be hard wood so that it looks like it has been crushed with small pieces.

== Nutrients in Seswaa ==
Seswaa meat contains nutrients that strengthen the body. These nutrients help to build the body's muscles. People who love meat are older and stronger.

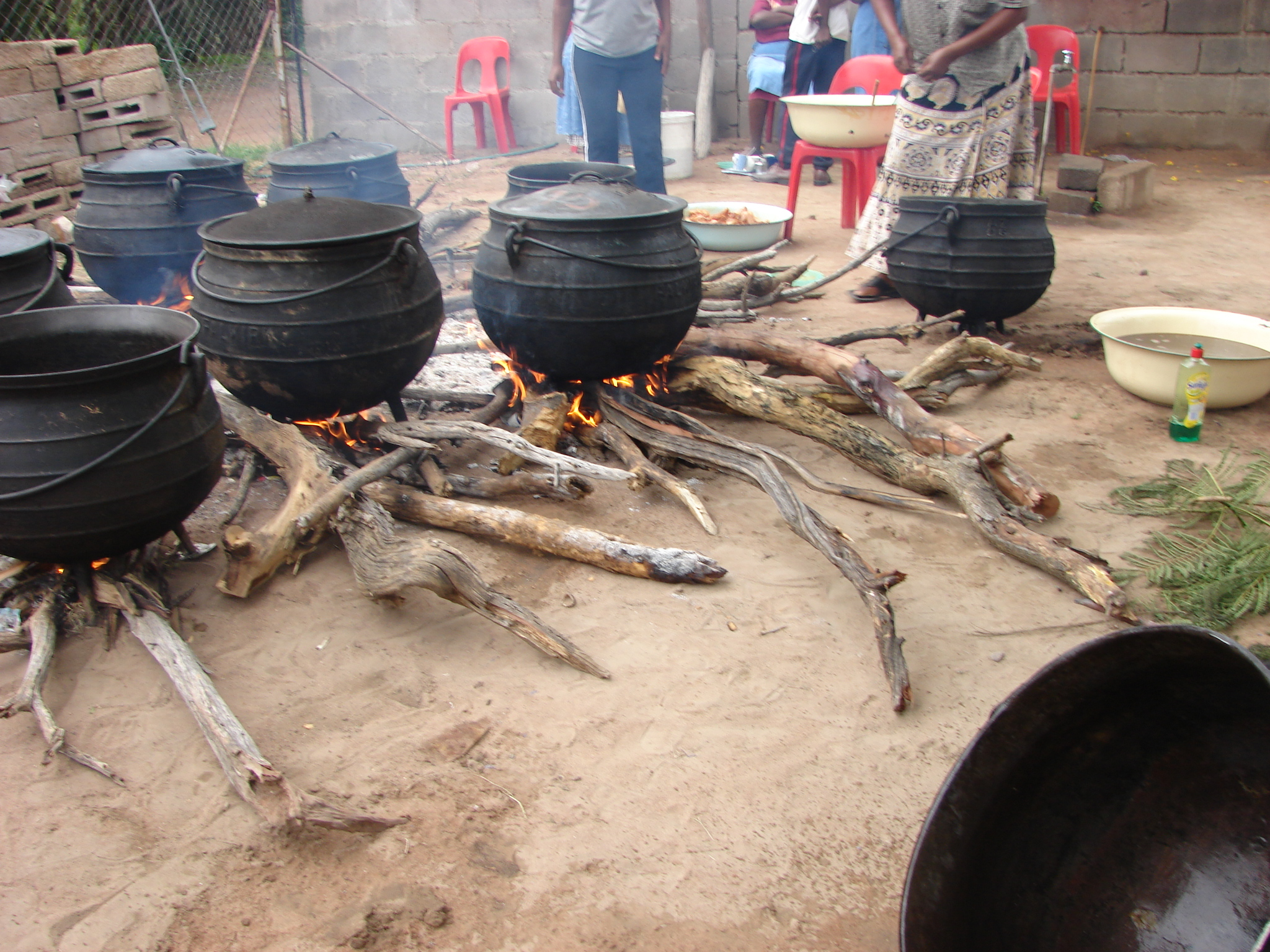

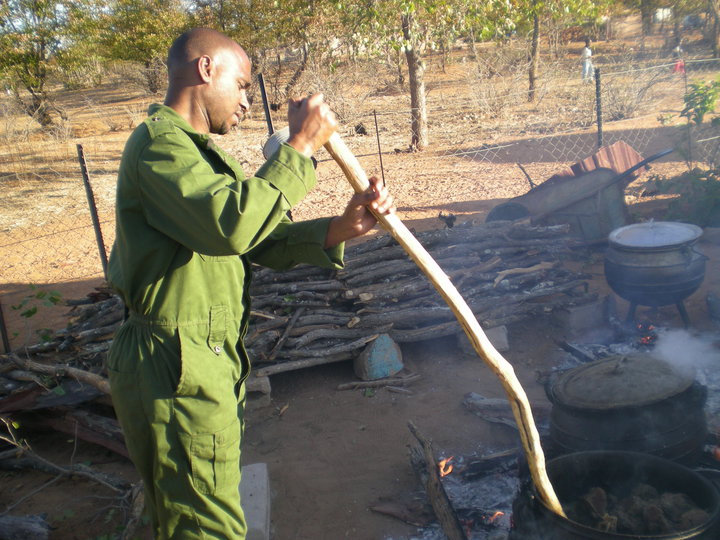

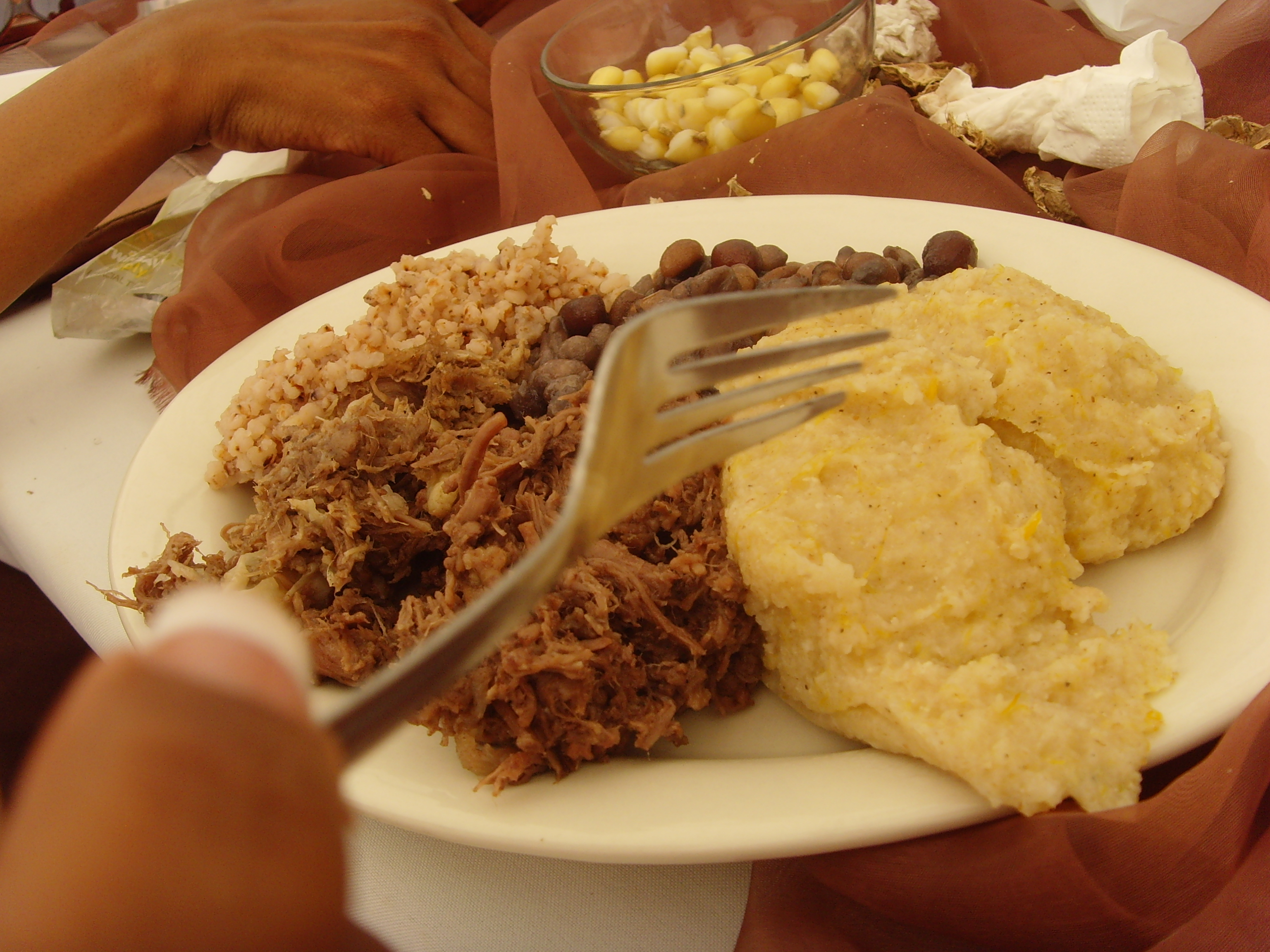

== See also ==
- List of African dishes
