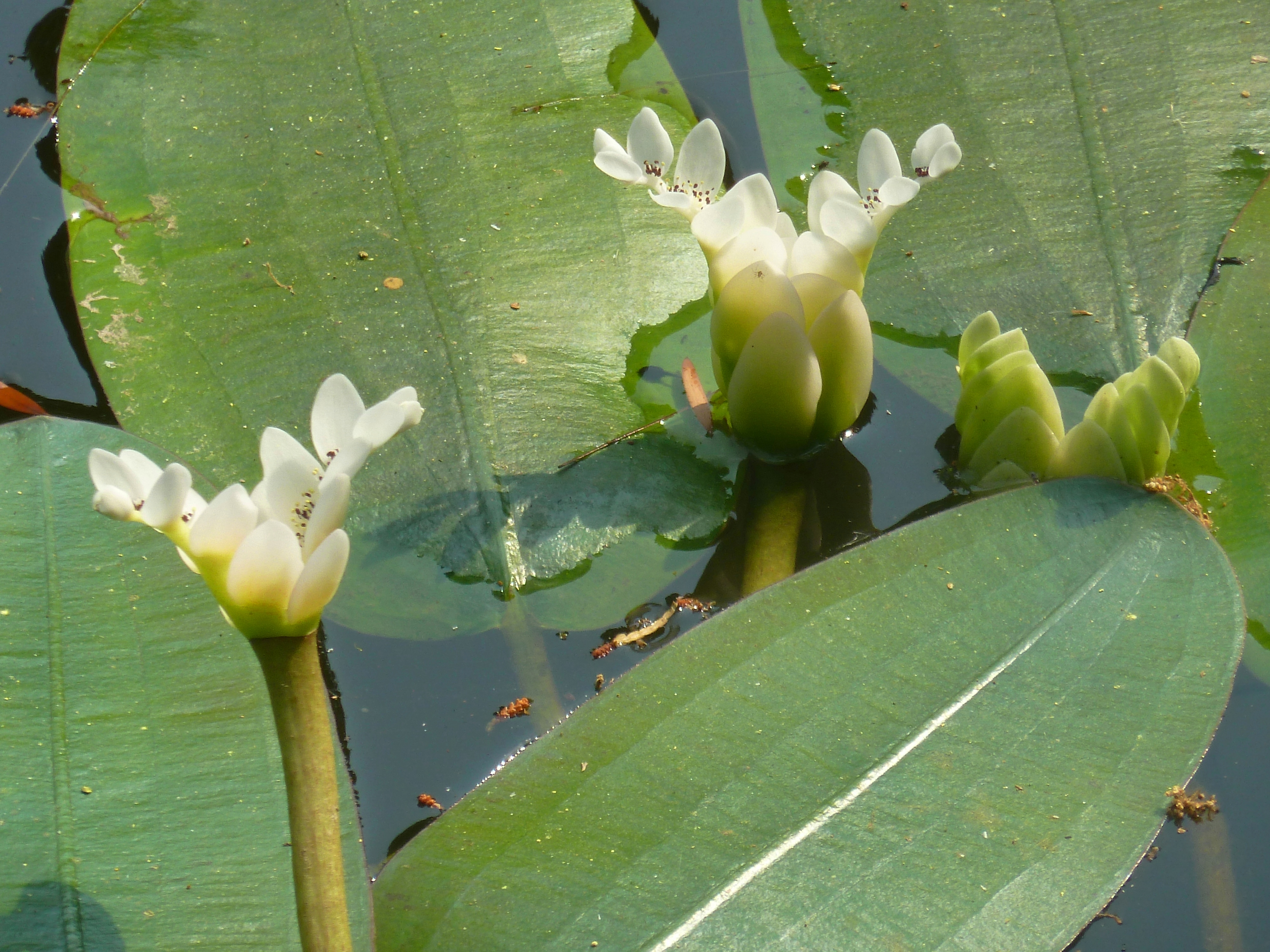
- Foliage and inflorescence

Conservation status
- Least Concern (IUCN 3.1)

Scientific classification
- Kingdom: Plantae
- Clade: Tracheophytes
- Clade: Angiosperms
- Clade: Monocots
- Order: Alismatales
- Family: Aponogetonaceae
- Genus: Aponogeton
- Species: A. distachyos

Binomial name
- Aponogeton distachyos L.f.
- Waterblommetjie (Aponogeton distachyos) distribution

= Aponogeton distachyos =

Species of aquatic plant endemic to South Africa

Aponogeton distachyos or Aponogeton distachyum, also known as waterblommetjie (lit. trans. water-floret), Cape-pondweed, water hawthorn, vleikos and Cape pond weed is an aquatic flowering plant.

== Origin ==
Native to South Africa's Western Cape and Mpumalanga provinces, but introduced elsewhere in quiet ponds in warm temperate to subtropical climates in winter rainfall areas. It grows in ponds and vleis which dry up in summer, becoming dormant in the dry summer and growing again when the pools fill with autumn rain.

== Description ==
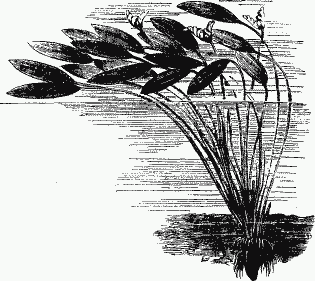
A. distachyos, habit, showing aerial and submerged parts

It is an aquatic plant growing from a tuberous rhizome. The often mottled leaves float on the water surface from a petiole up to 1 m long from the rhizome; the leaf blade is narrow oval, 6–25 cm long and 1.5–7.7 cm broad, with an entire margin and parallel veins. The flowers are produced on an erect spike with two branches at the apex like a 'Y', held above the water surface; they are sweetly scented, with one or two white petal-like perianth segments 1–2 cm long, and six or more dark purple-brown stamens.

The species was described by Carolus Linnaeus the Younger in Supplementum Plantarum 32, 214. 1782 (as "distachyon").

== Cultivation and uses ==
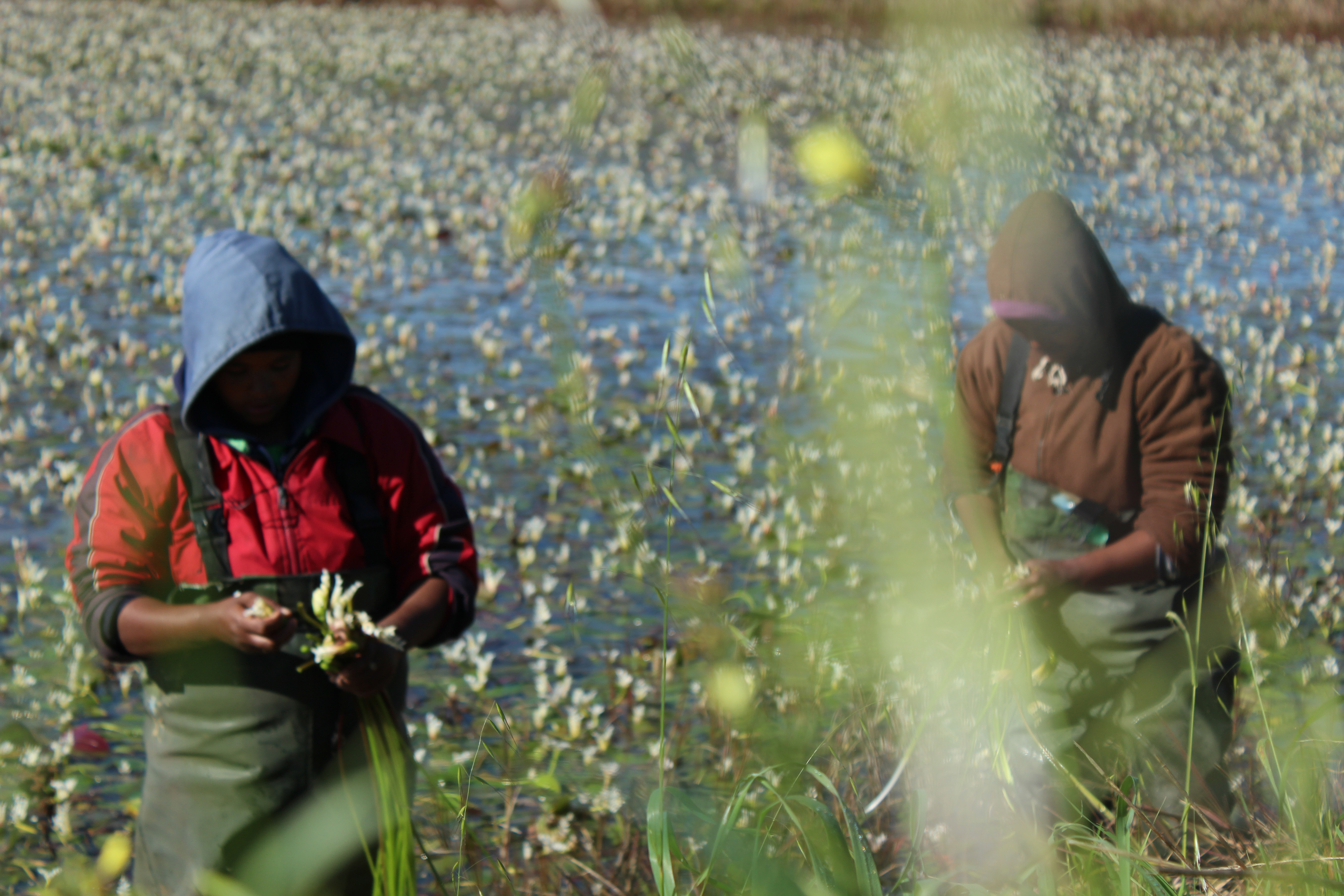
Agricultural workers harvesting waterblommetjies for human consumption in the Western Cape, South Africa.

It is widely cultivated in South Africa for its edible buds and flowers, used in the recipe waterblommetjiebredie.

It is also used as an aquarium and pond plant. It was introduced to Europe in the seventeenth century, and later into other parts of the world. It has escaped into the wild and has become widely naturalised in Australia, and more locally in France and England. In North America it is naturalised in southern and western California.

It will grow in full sun or partial shade. Planting depth should be about 45 centimetres (18 in).

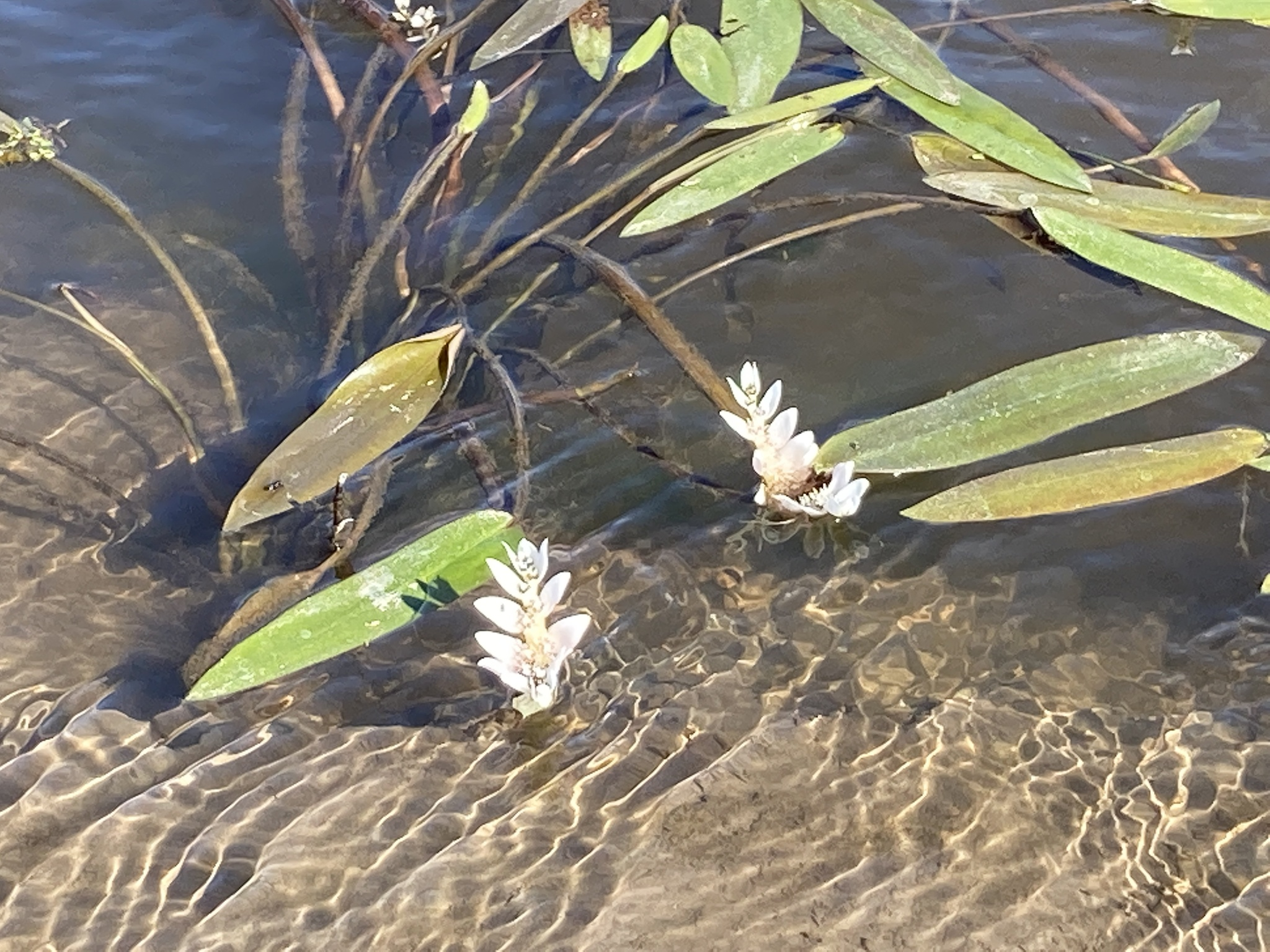

In the UK at least, it flowers rather unpredictably, but the first flowers generally appear from mid-spring onwards with a break in mid-summer. During a mild winter the flowers may continue to appear intermittently. In deeper water the dormant plants survive the winter at the bottom of the pond, but where winters are severe it is a good idea to lift them and overwinter indoors. They can be divided from November to April. Seeds can be found floating on the surface of the aquarium / pond and can be sown in the Spring in about just over an inch of water (3 cm) on a peat / loam substrate at about 20 °C (68 °F) where they will germinate in 1–2 months. Pot on into individual pots and grow in a sheltered spot for the first year in shallow water.
