= Ravitoto =

Traditional Malagasy cuisine

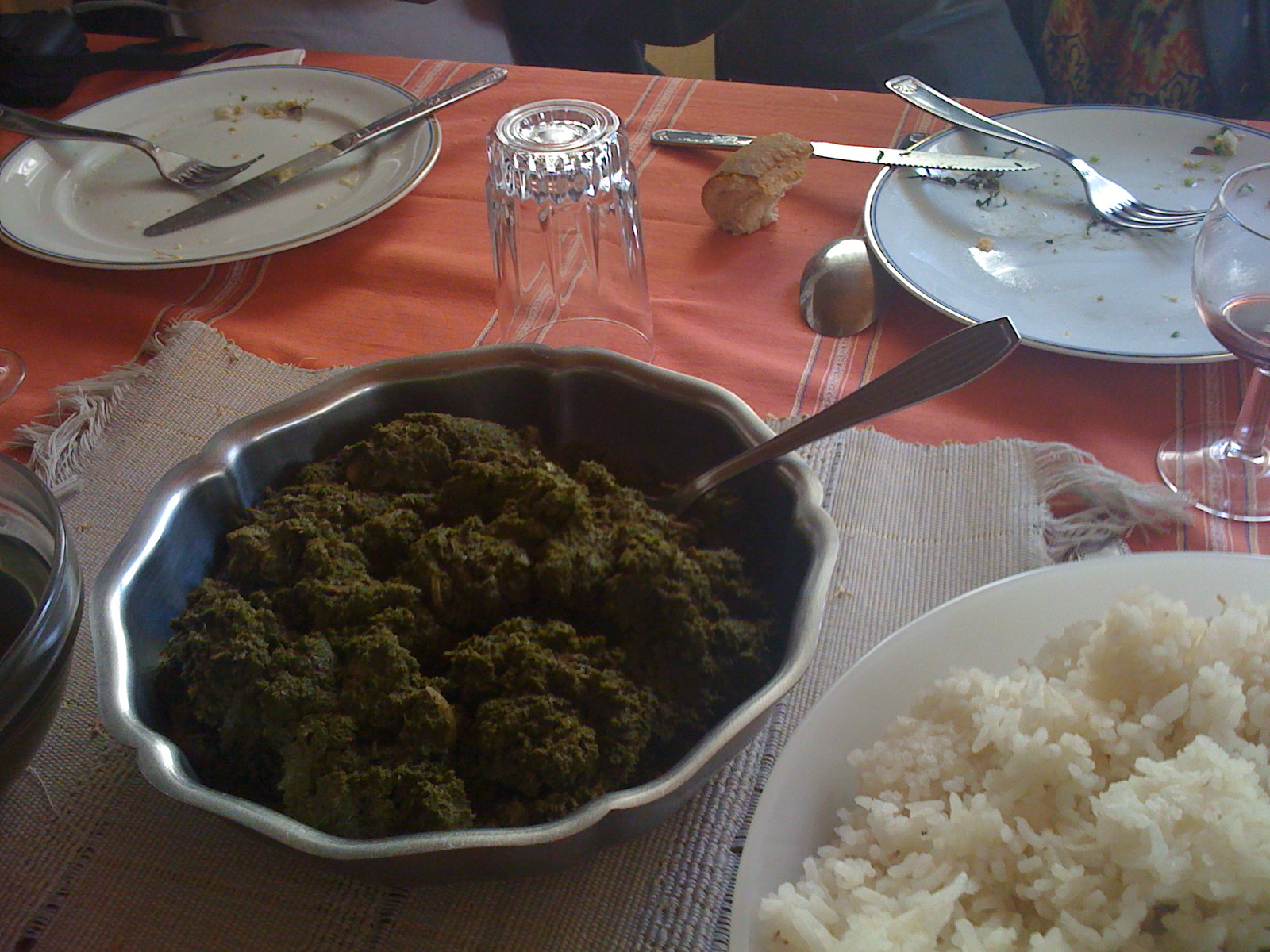
Ravitoto

Ravitoto (French: ravitoto [ravˈtutʷ]) is a traditional dish in Malagasy cuisine. Ravitoto means 'crushed cassava leaves'. These are specifically sweet cassava leaves pounded with a mortar or meat grinder. It is cooked with garlic and very fatty pork. In other societies, coconut milk is used instead to cook cassava leaves, like mataba in the Comoros. Dried fish or small shrimp, called tsivaki, can be added.

== See also ==
- Daun ubi tumbuk
