= Mukhbaza =

Traditional East African flatbread

Mukhbaza (also spelled Moukhbaza or Mukhbasa) is a traditional Middle Eastern and East African dish centered around slow-roasted, heavily spiced fish and flatbread. Originating from the coastal Tihama and Aden regions, it is a staple in Yemeni, Saudi, and Djiboutian cuisines. The bread is taken, sometimes, with stews, meat dishes, legumes, or vegetable sauces. Mukhbaza is valued for its soft texture and versatility in meals. It is usually eaten at home and during communal gatherings. Mukhbaza is prepared with wheat flour, water, salt, and sometimes yeast. The dough is kneaded, shaped into rounds, and cooked on a heated metal surface or in an oven. Different regional methods varies, and some may produce either thin or thick forms of the bread. Some localities as well add the bread to butter or oil after cooking. The dish is served with meat stews, lentils, beans, or spiced sauces. In some places, it is used to scoop food by hand in communal dining traditions.

== Ingredients ==
Mukhbaza is typically prepared using a combination of vegetables, including potatoes, eggplants, zucchini, carrots, onions, and tomatoes. Garlic, chili peppers, and regional spice mixtures may also be added to enhance flavor. Variations of the dish exist depending on local traditions and ingredient availability.

== Preparation ==
The vegetables are generally cut into pieces and cooked until tender. Tomatoes, onions, garlic, and spices are then incorporated to produce a thick stew-like mixture. In some regional variations, the vegetables may be roasted or fried before being combined with the sauce. The finished dish is commonly served hot with Yemeni bread.
