= Ekwang =

African cuisine

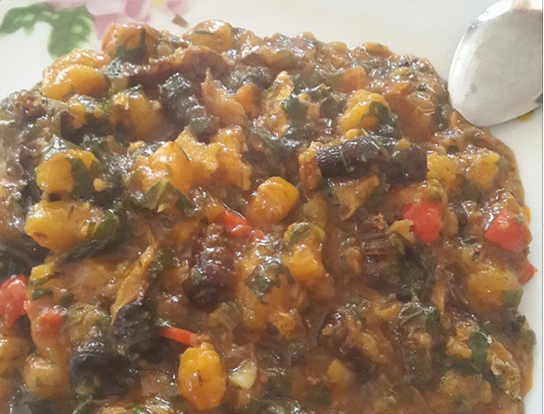
Ekwang

Ekwang (also known as "Ekpang Nkukwo" in "Efik", "Ekpang" in "Ibibio/Annang" and "Ekwang Coco") is a Cameroonian and Nigerian dish native to the Bakweri, Bafaw, Oroko, Cross River State and Akwa Ibom State people. It is made with freshly grated cocoyams that are wrapped in cocoyam leaves. Other ingredients include fresh or smoked fish, meat, palm oil, crayfish, Periwinkle and seasoning.
