= Braaibroodjie =

South African cuisine

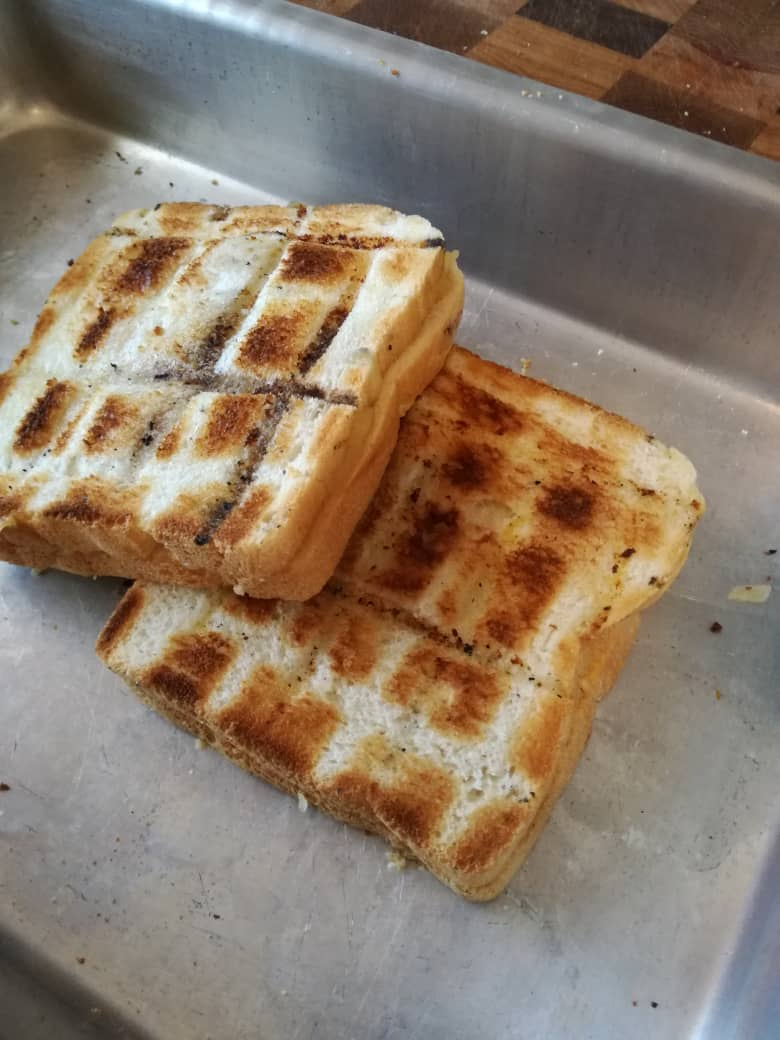
- Type: Sandwich
- Course: Snack, main course
- Place of origin: South Africa, Namibia
- Main ingredients: Sliced bread; Cheese; Tomato; Onion
- Ingredients generally used: Chili; Garlic butter

'

Braaibroodjie or Kaapse broodjie is a toasted sandwich made with bread, cheese, tomato, and onion found in South African and Namibian cuisine. Braaibroodjies is associated with South Africa's braai culture, where food is prepared publicly over an open fire. Considered a staple food during braais, it can be a snack or a main course.

== Preparation ==
Cheese, tomato, and onion are placed in-between the two slices of bread, and then it is placed on a grill over hot coals or in a sandwich press. It is cooked on both sides until golden brown, with the cheese fully melted. Some variations use chili or garlic butter.

== Adaptations ==
Afrikaner singer-songwriter Ziané Saayman released in 2025 a song about the cuisine, titled "Die Braaibroodjie Reël".

== See also ==
- South African cuisine
- Braai
- Toast sandwich
- Grilled cheese
- Croque monsieur
