= Mbongo Tchobi =

Cameroonian cuisine

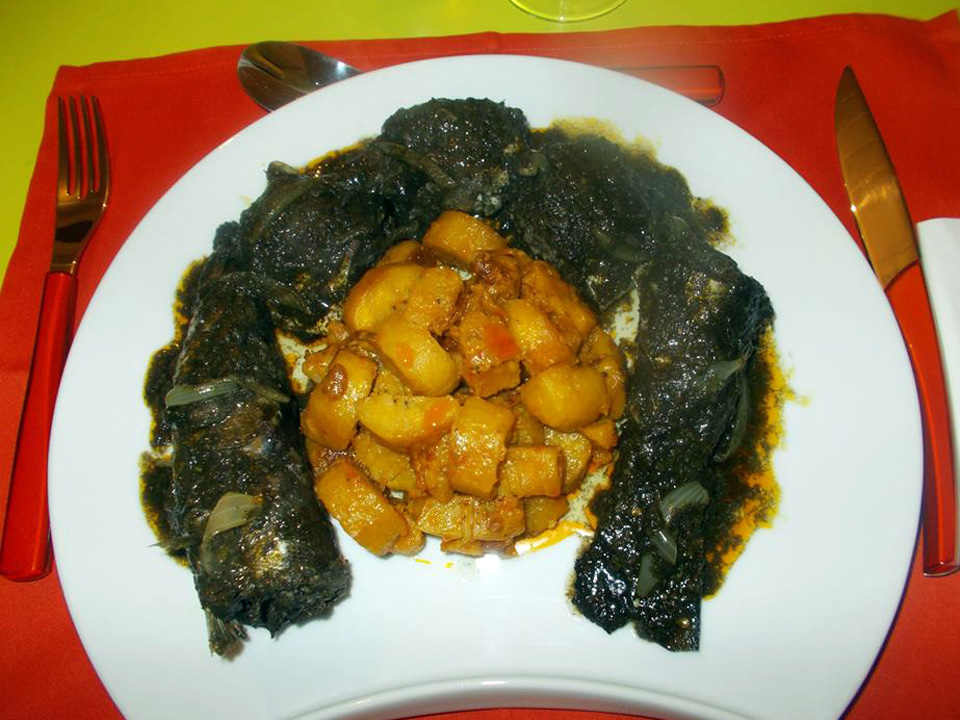
Mbongo Tchobi

Mbongo Tchobi is an African cuisine commonly made by the Bassa people of Cameroon. It is a black soup made from the burnt mbongo spice, usually cooked with meat or fish and served with steamed ripe plantains.

== Origin ==
The food is a traditional Cameroonian dish. It is a dark, aromatic stew made with fish or meat and roasted spices. It is commonly served with staples such as plantains, cassava, yams, or rice.

The dish originates from the Bassa people of Cameroon. The term mbongo refers to the dark spice mixture used in the sauce, while tchobi is commonly used locally to refer to fish in certain dialects.

== Ingredients ==
The mbongo spice is the major ingredient. Other include palm oil, onions, garlic, ginger, and tomatoes. Itnis cooked with catfish, though beef, chicken, or goat meat are commonly used.

== Preparation ==
The spice mixture is roasted until ot becomes dark, then it is ground into powder. It is combined with palm oil and other ingredients to form a thick, dark sauce.
