= Pampoenkoekies =

South African pumpkin fritter

Pampoenkoekies are traditional South African pumpkin fritters commonly served as dessert. The name is derived from two Afrikaans words: pampoen (lit. 'pumpkin') and koekies (lit. 'small cakes or fritters'). They are made from mashed pumpkin mixed with flour, eggs, sugar, and spices, then fried until it turns golden brown.

Pampoenkoekies are associated with Afrikaner cuisine and are served, though optionally, with cinnamon sugar or caramel sauce.

== Preparation ==
The fritters are prepared using cooked pumpkin, flour, baking powder, eggs, milk, and sugar. Cinnamon and nutmeg are commonly added for flavour and taste.

The batter is then spooned into hot oil and fried until golden brown. After frying, the fritters are either coated with cinnamon sugar or served with syrup.

== Culinary purpose ==
Pampoenkoekies are commonly taken during family meals, festive occasions, and Sunday lunches in South Africa. It is usually served alongside meat dishes like roasted lamb or grilled meats.
