= Ta'ameya =

Egyptian fava bean fritter

Ta'ameya (Arabic: طعمية) is an Egyptian fried fritter made from fava beans and herbs. A common street food and breakfast item in the country, it is often seen as a variant of Levantine falafel made instead with chickpeas.

== Ingredients ==
- Fava beans
- Cilantro
- Yellow onion
- Garlic cloves
- Coriander
- Cumin
- Sea salt
- Black pepper
- Baking soda

== Preparation ==
The beans are soaked and ground into a paste together with herbs, garlic, onions, and spices. They are then shaped into small balls and deep-fried. Sesame seeds are sometimes added to the exterior before frying.

== Culinary purpose ==
Ta'ameya is commonly eaten in sandwiches with pita bread, salad, pickled vegetables, and tahini sauce. The food is popularly sold by street vendors, restaurants, and cafés.

== Cultural importance ==
Ta'ameya was listed in the "List of Popular Egyptian Dishes" by Nilecruise. It is a general breakfast delicacy in Middle East and North Africa (MENA).
