= Deliberate food shortage conspiracy theory =

2022 American conspiracy theory

In 2022, several people claimed on social media that there was a deliberate campaign by the United States government to create an artificial famine.

== Background ==
The COVID-19 pandemic caused a global disruption of supply chains, thus fueling shortages. Many businesses and industries were impacted, which made shortages of goods a concern. As a result, many conspiracy theorists claim that it was the result of a manufactured plot, though these claims offer no evidence, which has led to them being debunked.

The 2022 Russian invasion of Ukraine created a global food crisis.

== Claims of deliberate shortages ==
According to a July 2021 Daily Dot article, a TikTok user claimed that then-ongoing food shortages in the United States were the result of deliberate action from the United States government, and that "shortages [were] coming". However, the article said that "the reality is that food supply shortages [were] already occurring", and that there was no evidence that the government deliberately caused them.

In June 2022, the News Literacy Project discussed a tweet claiming that a fire at an egg farm was part of a campaign of such actions deliberately undertaken to exacerbate food shortages; according to Snopes and FactCheck.org, spokespeople from the National Fire Protection Association said that there had not been an unusual amount of fires at such facilities. In the same month, Watt Poultry (an industry publication) published an article saying that, contrary to claims on social media that the number of such incidents was anomalously high, "most Americans have no idea what the frequency of farm and facility fires is in the first place", and that there was furthermore a lack of evidence of occurrences being carried out deliberately.

Food processing plants are highly susceptible to accidents due to the high level of moving parts and machinery that workers deal with. Conspiracy theorists claim that there has been a rise of these accidents, though it is likely the result of stress on the reopened supply chain, rather than a deliberate plot to attack the infrastructure.

Far-right congresswoman Marjorie Taylor Greene has claimed that the Democratic Party, or political left, is responsible for these accidents to take control of the "global economy".

== See also ==
- Economic impact of the COVID-19 pandemic
- List of conspiracy theories
