= Mesfouf =

Couscous dish cooked in butter or oil

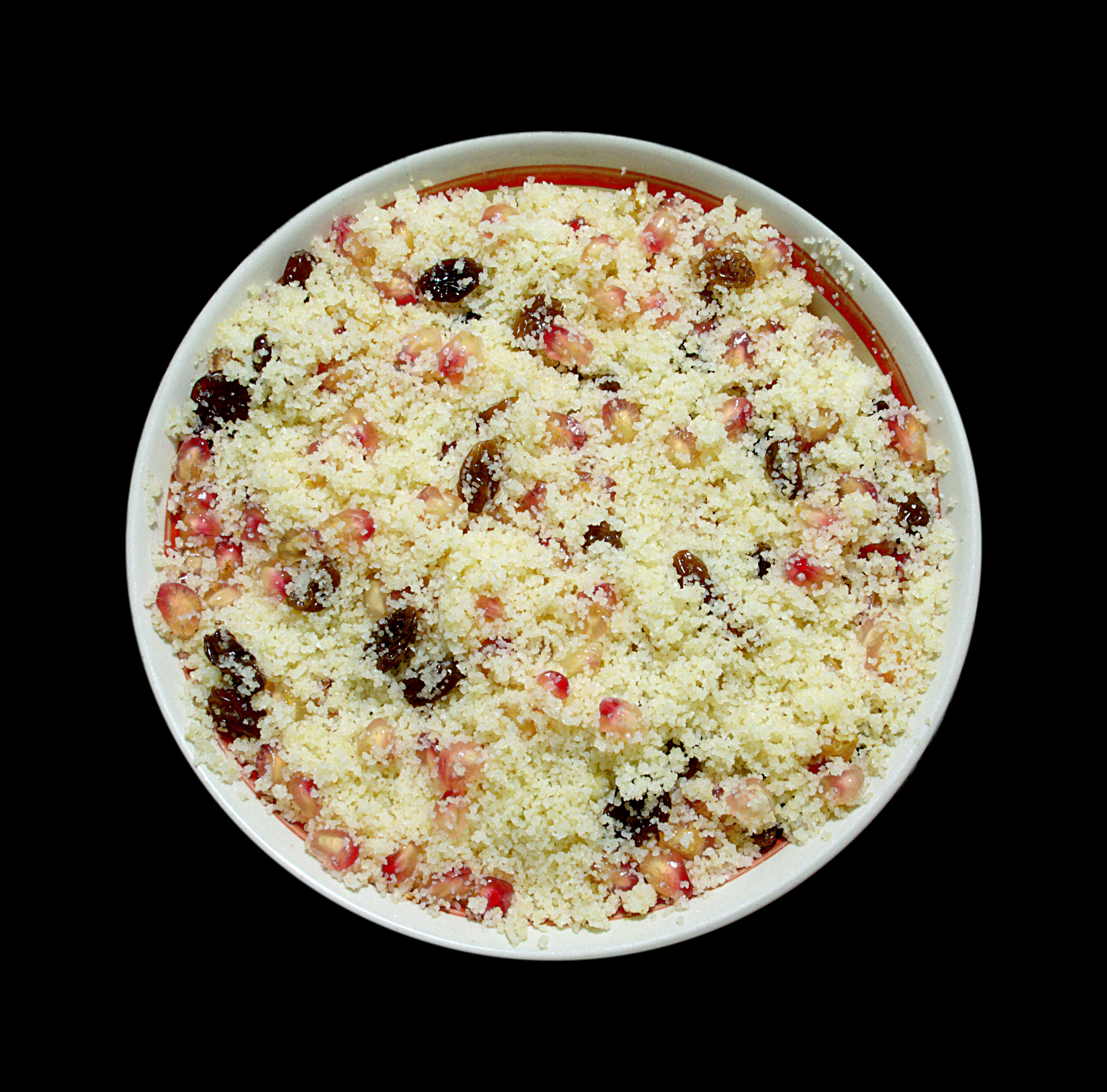
Tunisian-style mesfouf

Mesfouf, amekfoul or masfouf (Berber languages: Amekful, Arabic: مسفوف) is an Algerian and Tunisian dish which is a variant of couscous with finely rolled semolina and butter or olive oil.

This food is quite popular in the Maghreb. It is conventional to consume the mesfouf during the holy month of Ramadan. It is served at traditional celebrations or family meals.

== Local recipes ==
In Algeria, it is served as a main dish made of peas and beans. According to them, it is advisable to drink it with some whey or yoghurt to facilitate digestion even though it is lighter than couscous.

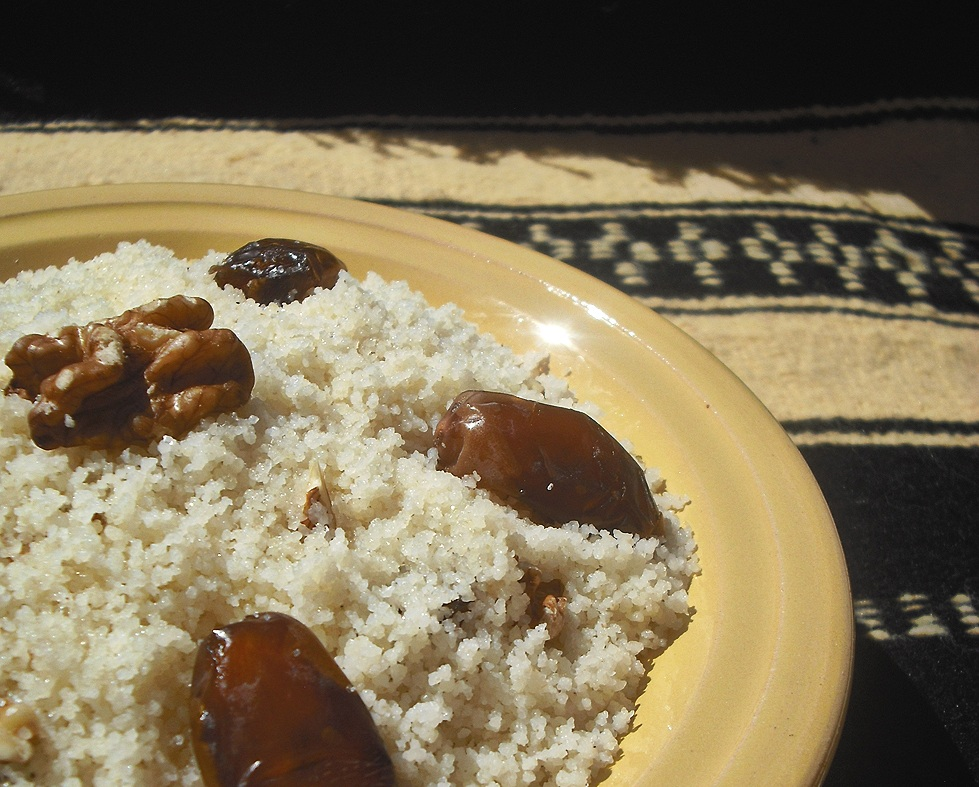
Algerian mesfouf

There are many local recipes for the mesfouf, such as the savory one and the sweet one. Some people opt for the one which contains vegetables and meat. As for the others, they want it accompanied with peas and dried grapes as in the surrounding of Tunis. Sfaxians prefer it decorated with almonds and dates and dried fruits (pistachios, hazel nuts) and custard. Some people also like to pour milk on the mesfouf and add sugar to it to make it sweet, as a "cereal", and some dried grapes and/or dates.

The Djerbian version of mesfouf is spicy and often composed of peppers, dried meat and various herbs (such as garlic, fennel, and lavender)

== See also ==
- List of African dishes
