= Botswana cuisine =

Culinary traditions of Botswana

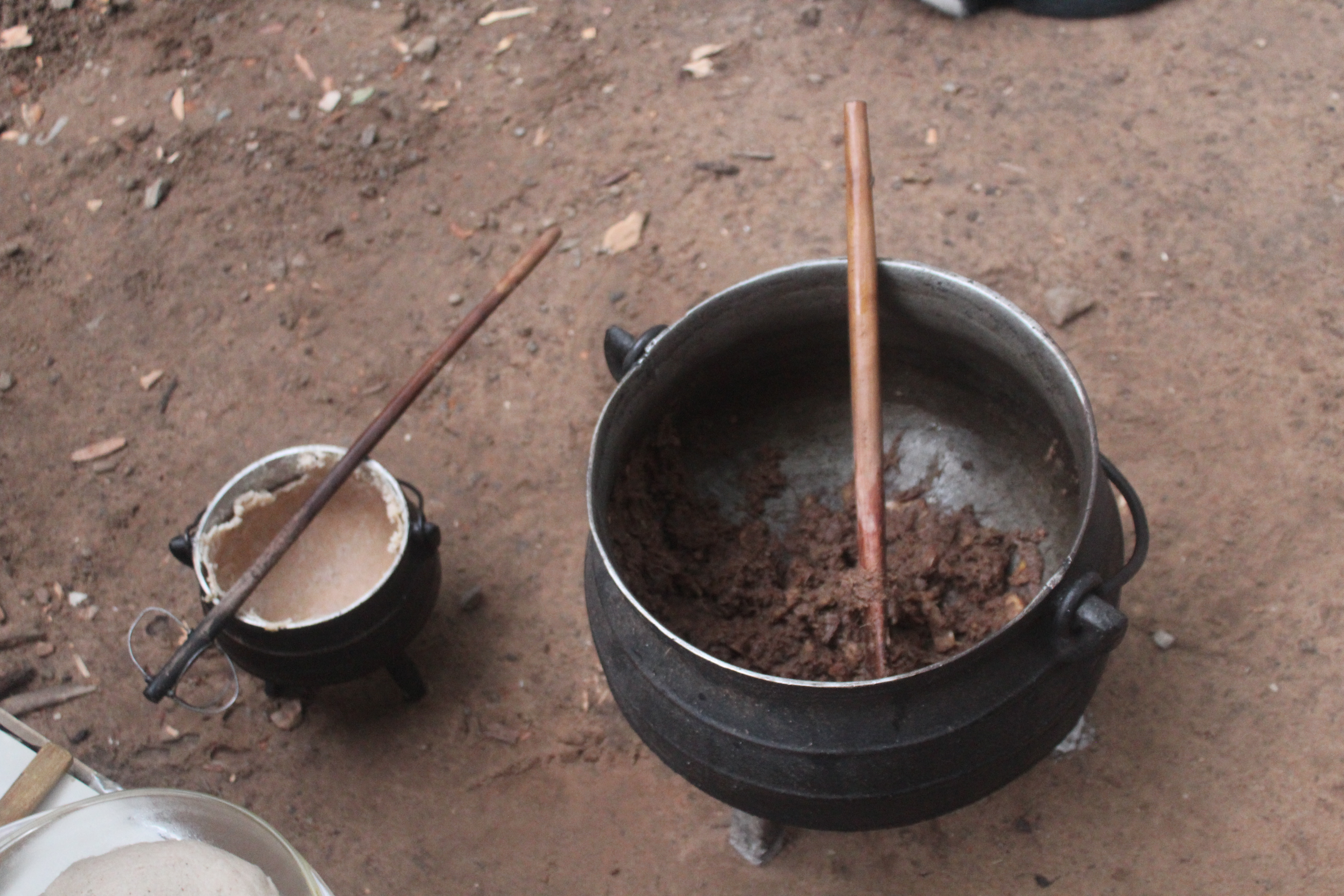
Bogobe and seswaa

The cuisine of Botswana is unique but shares some of its characteristics with other cuisines of Southern Africa. Examples of Setswana food include pap, samp, magwinya, bogobe and mophane worms. A food unique to Botswana is seswaa, salted mashed-up meat.

== Overview ==
watermelon

Watermelons are believed to have originated in Botswana. Other foods include morogo wa dinawa, madila and dikgobe.

Batswana procure beef, goat meat, sheep, tswana chicken, Mophane worms and fish locally. Batswana also make home-made refreshing drinks using watermelon, marula and ginger powder. At weddings, sorghum meal is usually cooked and mixed with melon and this mixture is called bogobe jwa lerotse. Usually the melon is pre-prepared with sour milk and stored to be used whenever needed. Batswana are good at food preservation. Among other methods, they preserve meat by cutting it into small lengths like strings, then dry it. When meat is like this, it is called digwapa. They also cook and dry bean leaves. It is also common among Batswana to make mageu from leftover porridge or pap. Some tribes also preserve spoiling or rotten meat by drying it to be used as relish for a long time. This type of meat is called mokungwana. Other foods prepared during weddings are samp mixed with beans or cooked without beans and eaten with pounded meat called seswaa.

== Ingredients ==
The markets of Botswana are filled with a large variety of foods. Some are grown locally using irrigation and some are imported from neighbouring countries. A large quantity of high-quality beef is raised in Botswana. Lamb, mutton, chicken and other meats are also plentiful. Beef is the most popular meat, followed by goat meat. River fish are also part of Botswana cuisine.

Sorghum and maize are the main crops grown in Botswana. Wheat and rice and other kinds of cereals not grown locally are imported. Many different kinds of beans are grown, including cowpeas, ditloo, and letlhodi (mung beans). Peanuts (manoko) are also grown. Many vegetables are grown, such as spinach, carrots, cabbage, onions, potatoes, tomatoes, sweet potatoes and lettuce. There are some vegetables that grow in the wild that are available seasonally including thepe and delele (okra). Dried bean leaves are a popular Setswana food.

Many fruits are locally available, including marula. Watermelons, believed to have come originally from Botswana, are plentiful in season. Another kind of melon, called lerotse or lekatane, is also grown. There are some kinds of wild melon found in sandy desert areas which are an important food and water source for the people who live in those areas. Many vegetables are seasonal and are often dried or salted for preservation. There are many different ways of cooking dried vegetables.

== Popular dishes ==
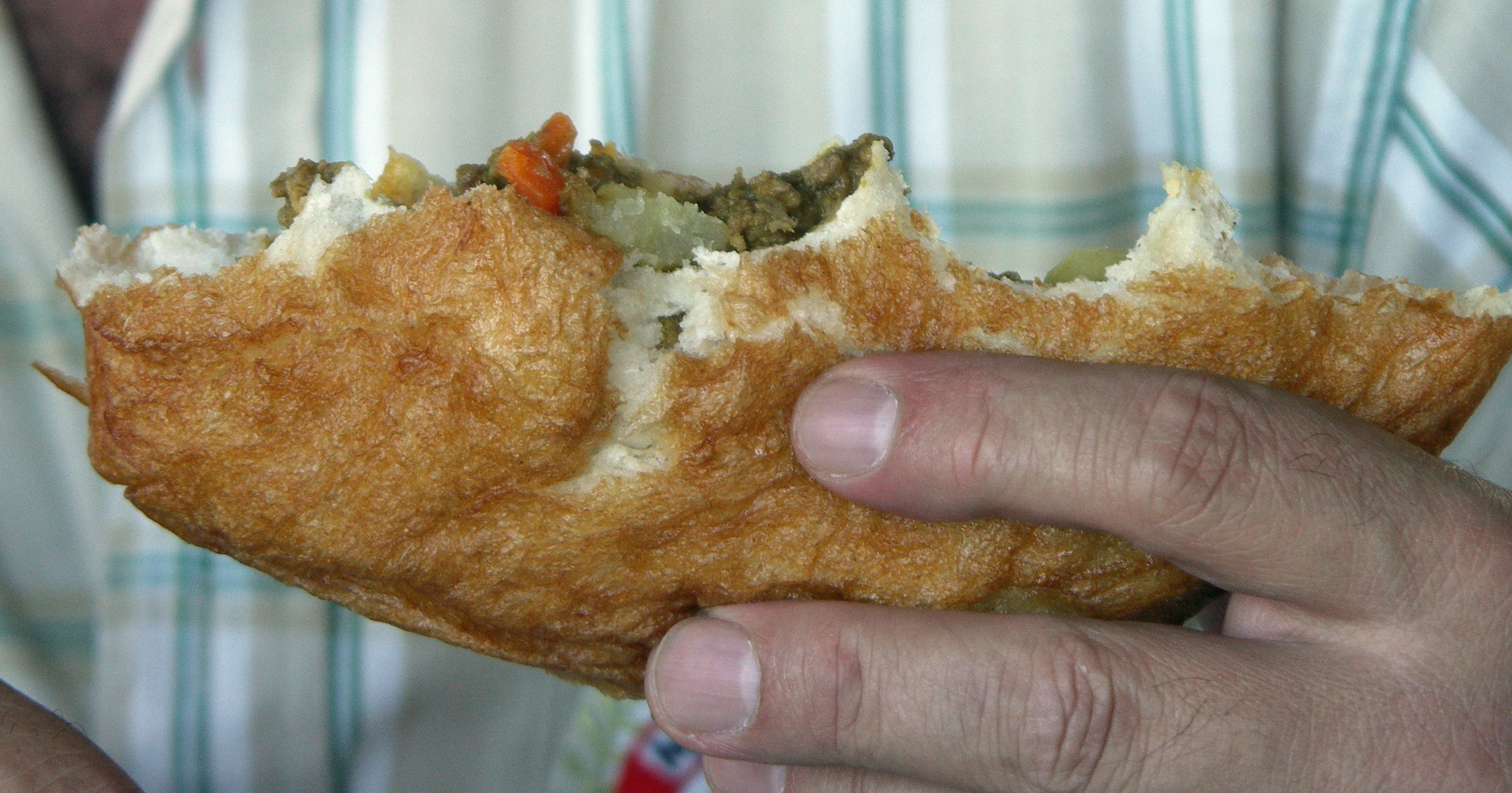
Vetkoek, a pastry with mince that originated in South Africa

Seswaa

Seswaa, tshotlho or leswao (pounded beef) is a popular traditional meat dish made for most special occasions. Usually prepared by men, it is cooked in a three-legged iron pot, simmered until soft with only salt, cooking oil and water. It is usually prepared using goat meat or beef and it is a staple in meals associated with traditional occasions such as funerals and weddings.

Serobe

Another type is serobe, in which the intestines and other offal of goat, sheep or cow are cooked until soft. Before cooking, the intestines are thoroughly washed. If the animal is sheep or goat, the trotters are included. For this food to be serobe, a scissor used to cut meat is used to cut the intestines into small pieces.

The other type of meat is of chicken. Traditionally grown chicken (free-range) is considered to be tastier than commercially grown chickens. By cooking a traditionally grown chicken for a guest, a host shows special hospitality. Cooking chicken in a three-legged iron pot on an open fire gives it the best flavour. Chicken meat is usually eaten with dumplings or pap.

Bogobe is made by putting sorghum, maize or millet flour into boiling water, stirring into a soft paste, and then cooking it slowly. Sometimes the sorghum or maize is fermented before cooking for some days to make it sour. This dish is called ting. This sour porridge can be cooked and eaten with meat or milk and sugar. Without the milk and sugar, ting Another way of making bogobe is to add sour milk and a cooking melon (lerotse). This dish is called tophi by the Kalanga tribe.

Bread flour is not part of the basic diet, but has been imported for some years, so there are various bread recipes that have become part of the national food. The most common are dumplings (matlebelekwane or madombi), flat cakes (diphaphatha) and fat cakes (magwinya). For these, the flour is made into dough which is cooked in different ways such as boiling with meat, cooking in hot oil or on hot coals putting on a pot lead.

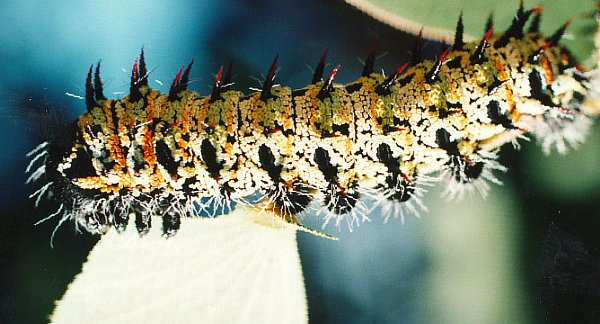
A mopane worm

Popular foods in remote areas include morama bean, a huge underground tuber, and an edible fungus. Mopane worm, caterpillar of the moth Gonimbrasia belina, is cooked in hot ashes, boiled, or dried and fried.

== Beverages ==
Ginger Beer

Madila (Fememnted milk)

Many soft drinks and alcoholic drinks are produced in factories in Botswana, including Fanta and Coca-Cola. Local brands are Castle and Lion beers. Milk is fermented to make madila (sour milk) which is eaten on its own or added to porridge. A favorite non-alcoholic homemade drink is ginger beer. This drink is popularly served at special occasions like weddings and parties. It is prepared by boiling ginger powder in water, adding sugar, tartaric acid and cream of tartar then left to cool and fermented for one day.

There are various traditionally produced alcoholic drinks. Bojalwa ja Setswana (the beer of Botswana) is brewed from fermented sorghum seeds. Other tribes, like Bakalanga, use lebelebele (millet). A commercially produced and packaged beer, Chibuku, brewed from either maize or sorghum, is a favourite drink particularly in the villages, towns, and in some parts of the city. Chibuku is also brewed in other neighbouring countries such as Malawi, South Africa (Umqombothi), Zambia and Zimbabwe. Khadi, which is brewed from various ingredients, the healthiest of which is wild berries, is also a widely consumed alcoholic drink among low-income groups in particular. There are other beverages such as mints called kgomodimetsing and longman. These are leaves that are usually mixed with tea for a good scented taste.

== See also ==
- List of African cuisines

== Sources ==
- Hughes, Jane (2013). The Adventurous Vegetarian: Around the World in 30 Meals. New Internationalist. ISBN 978-1-78026-124-9.
- Molefhe, Wame (2007). Botswana Traditional Recipes – with a twist. Gaborone: Department of Arts and Culture. ISBN 978-99912-0-986-9.
