= Mietta O'Donnell =

Australian restaurateur and writer (1950–2001)

Mietta Fernanda O'Donnell (6 January 1950 – 4 January 2001) was a Melbourne-based Australian restaurateur, chef and food writer, described in her later years as Australia's leading culinary publisher and critic. She was also a noted arts and music patron, and a song competition is named in her honour.

== Career ==
O'Donnell was born in Glen Iris, a suburb of Melbourne, Victoria. Her maternal grandparents were Italian migrants, Teresa and Mario Vigano, who arrived in Melbourne from Milan in 1928 to establish Mario's Restaurant in Exhibition Street, Melbourne, which they ran for over thirty years. O'Donnell, with her partner Tony Knox, opened her restaurant Mietta's in Brunswick Street, Fitzroy North, in June 1974. Mietta's moved in 1985 to Alfred Place in central Melbourne, eventually closing in 1995.

In February 1992, Jex Saarelaht and Kate Ceberano performed at the restaurant. They recorded and later released an album titled Open the Door – Live at Mietta's.

O'Donnell was killed in a car accident near Burnie, Tasmania, while travelling to speak at a food and wine seminar. Her funeral was attended by over 1,000 people from the arts, politics, and the culinary world.

The cocktail by the name of Japanese slipper was created in 1984 by Jean-Paul Bourguignon at Mietta's Restaurant. It is a drink made from Midori, Cointreau, and lemon juice.

== Mietta Song Competition ==
Mietta's Restaurant had also become a salon of the arts, including music. In 1995, along with her partner Tony Knox, Len Vorster, Michael Easton and Lauris Elms, O'Donnell co-founded an annual art song competition which she ran herself. In 1996, it was named the City of Melbourne Song Recital Award. After her death in 2001, the competition was revived in 2003 as the Mietta Song Recital Award. Since 2004, it has been held every two years. It is now known as the Mietta Song Competition.

== Publications ==
Books authored by O'Donnell include:

- 1996 – Mietta and Friends. Wilkinson Books: Melbourne. ISBN 1-86350-221-1
- 1999 – Great Australian Chefs. (With Tony Knox). Schwartz Publishing: Melbourne. ISBN 1-86395-122-9
- 2000 – Mietta's Italian Family Recipes. Black Inc.: Melbourne. ISBN 9781863952033
