= Melon soup =

Soup made primarily with melon

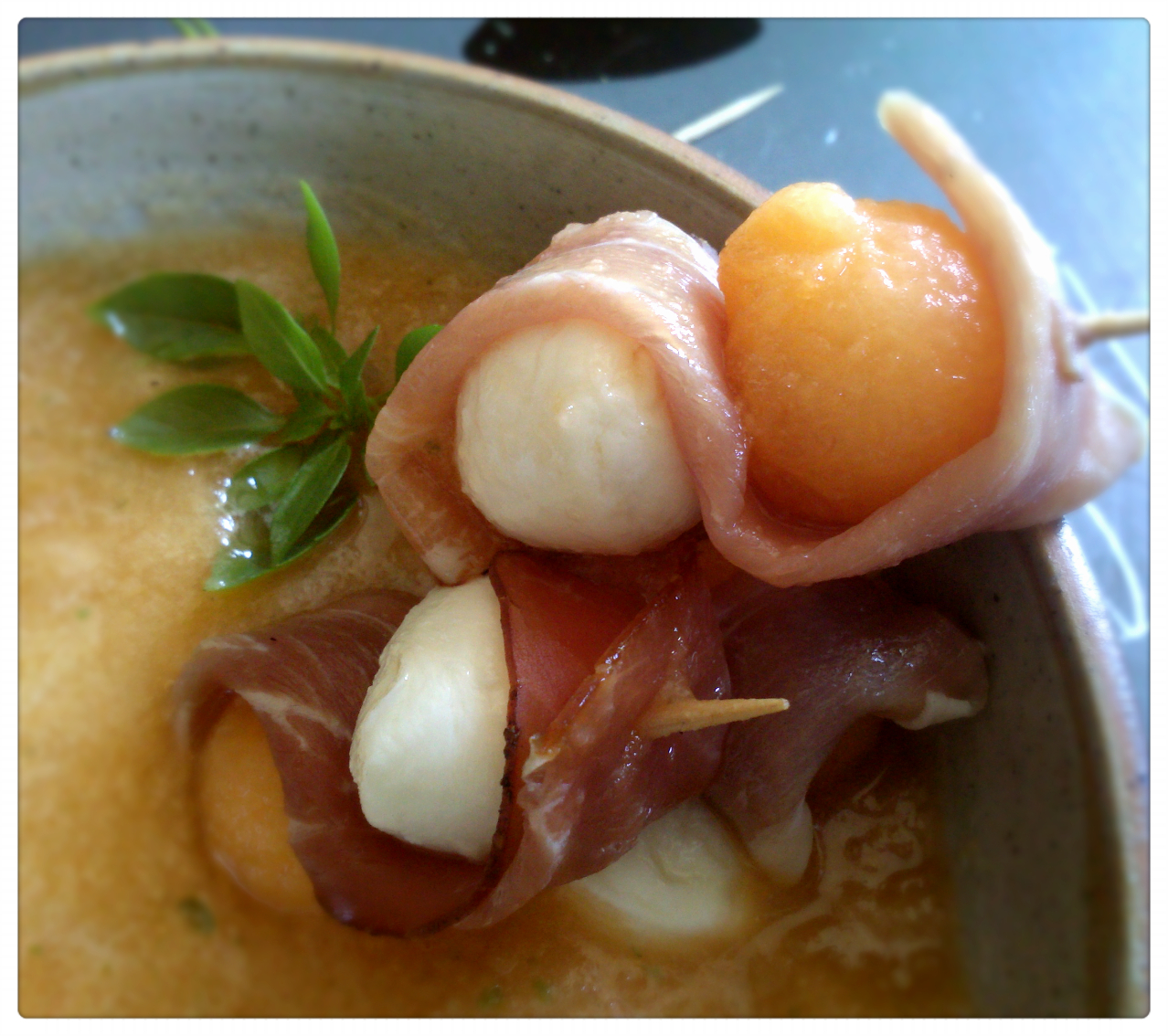
- A melon soup with skewers of melon balls, mozzarella balls and meat
- Type: Soup
- Serving temperature: Hot or chilled
- Main ingredients: Melon
- Variations: Bitter melon soup

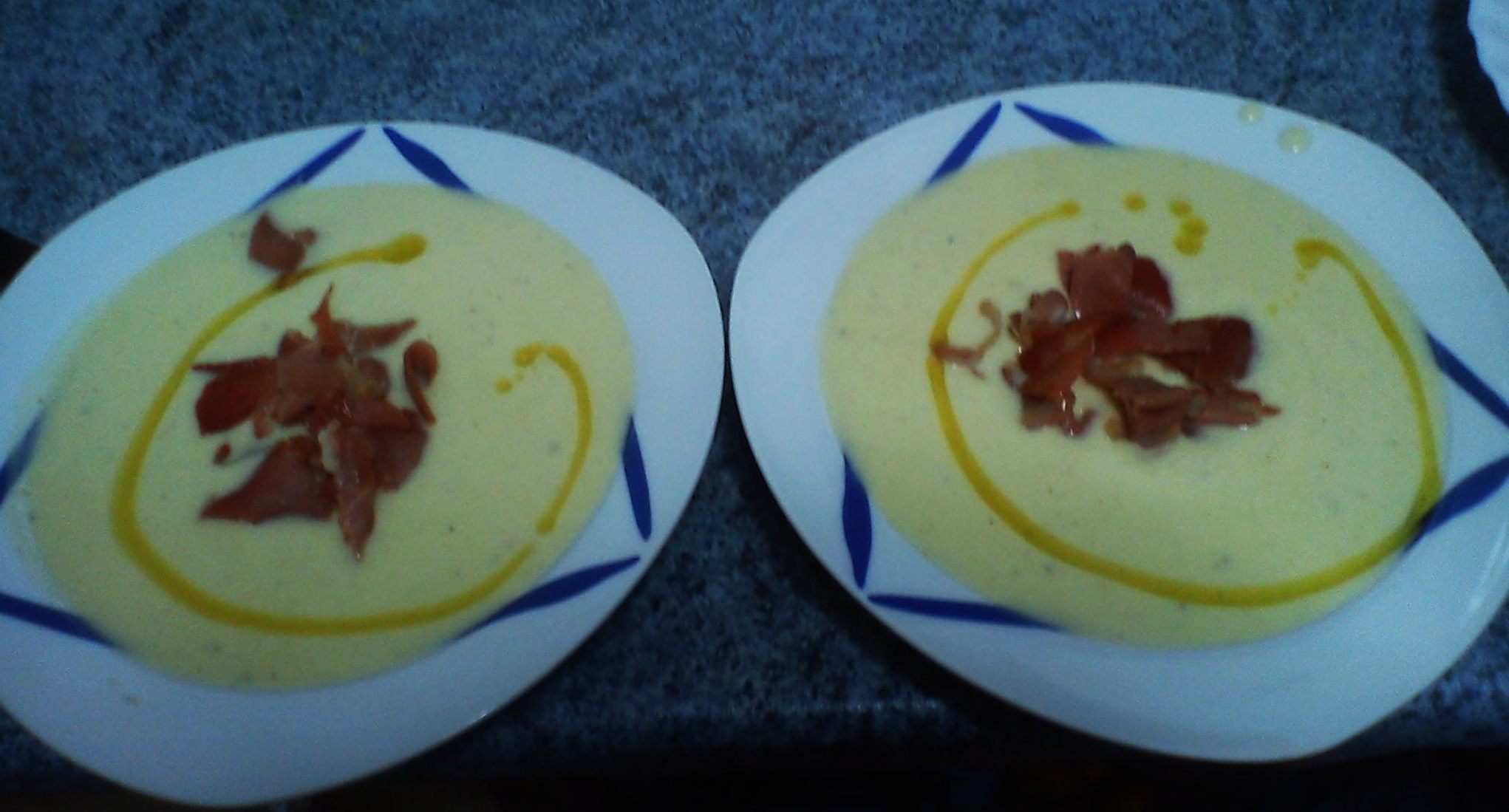
A cold melon soup with garnishes

Melon soup is a soup prepared with melon as a primary ingredient. Melons such as bitter melon, cantaloupe, crenshaw melon, honeydew (casaba melon), and winter melon may be used, among others. Some melon soups are prepared with whole pieces of melon, and others use puréed melon. Some are served hot, while others are served chilled. Some cold varieties are prepared without any cooking involved. Several styles and varieties of melon soups exist, including bitter melon soup, cantaloupe soup, and winter melon soup, among others. The origin of some melon soup recipes may cross international boundaries.

== Varieties ==
=== Bitter melon soup ===
Bitter melon soup is prepared using bitter melon as a primary ingredient, and is a part of Chinese cuisine. In Cantonese, bitter melon is referred to as "the cooling melon," using the term leung gwa. In the region of China's Pearl River Delta, bitter melon soup is prepared from fresh melons during the summer, and also from dried bitter melon powder during other seasons. It may be prepared including fish such as bass or carp.

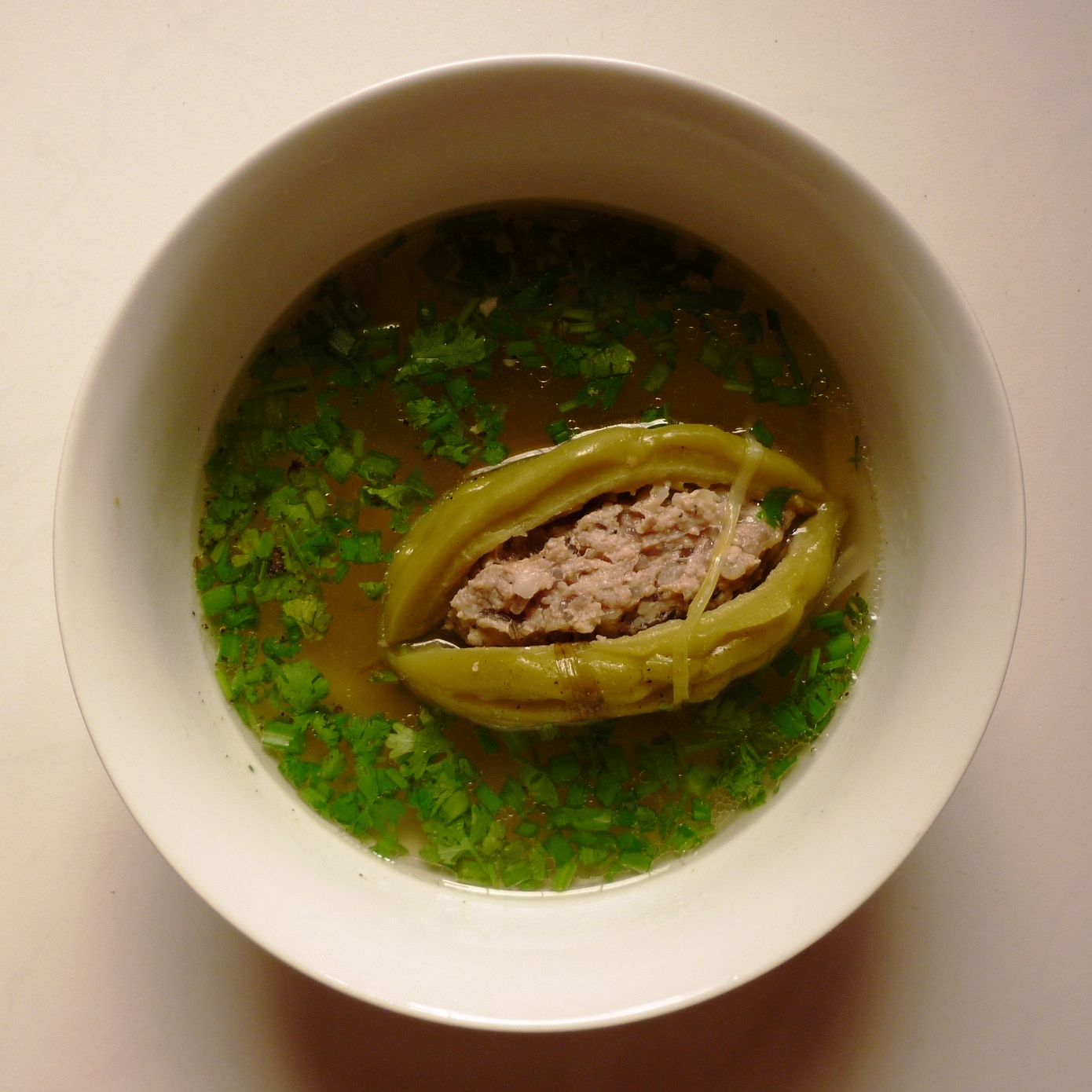
A bitter melon soup

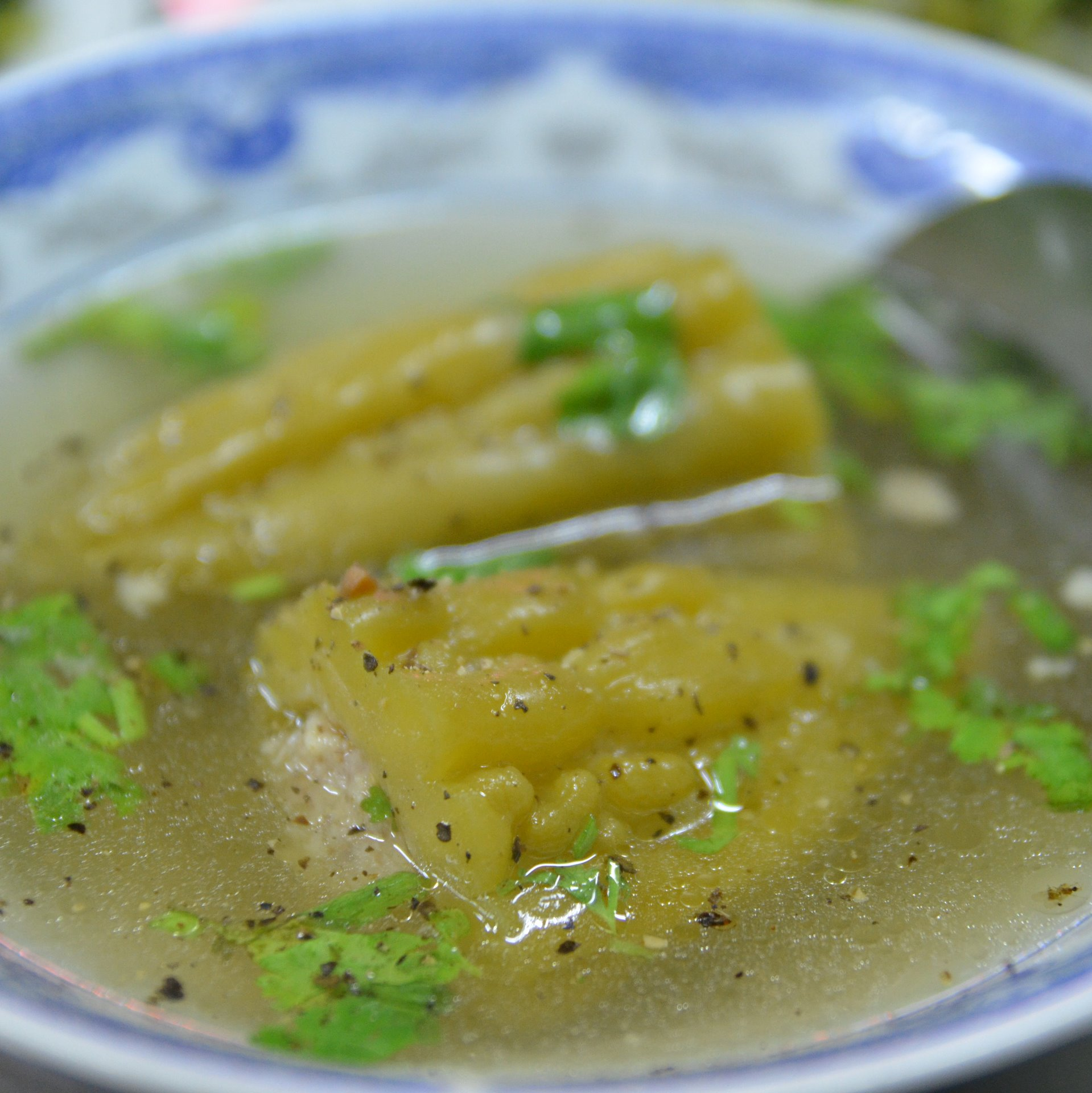
Bitter melon soup at a restaurant in Ho Chi Minh City, Vietnam

=== Cantaloupe soup ===
Cantaloupe soup is prepared with cantaloupe as a primary ingredient. It may be prepared in puréed form and is typically served chilled. It is sometimes referred to as muskmelon soup. Cantaloupe soup may be served as a first course or starter dish prior to a main course. The use of well-ripened cantaloupe can create an optimal texture and enhance the sweet flavor of the soup. Additional ingredients can include lime juice, lemon juice, apple juice, orange juice, salt, pepper, herbs such as mint or basil, cayenne pepper, and balsamic vinegar. Spicy versions may be prepared using chili peppers. A cantaloupe soup recipe using one large cantaloupe melon, one-half cup orange juice, and one-quarter cup of honey has 147 calories per one-cup serving.

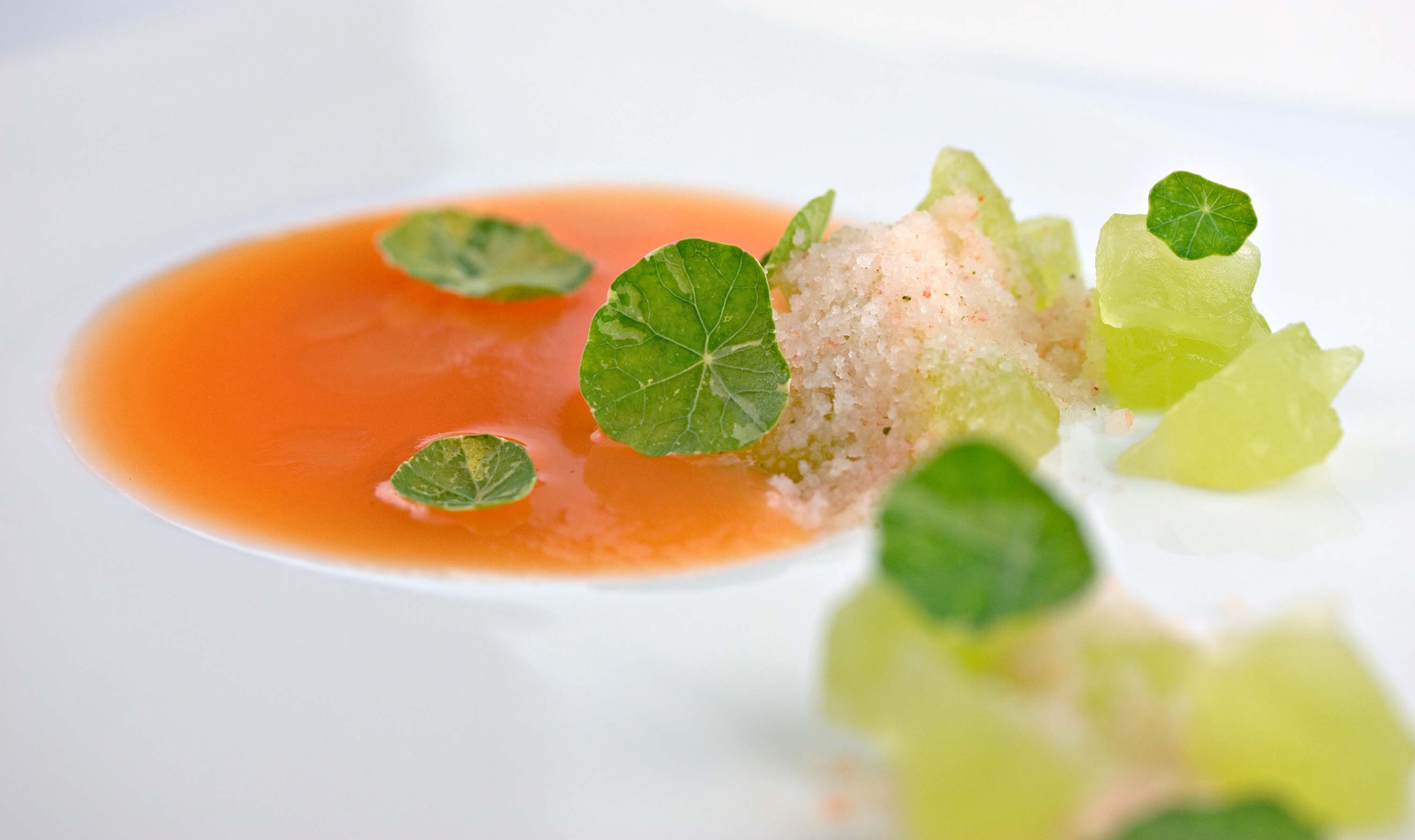
A cantaloupe soup

=== Watermelon soup ===
Watermelon soup is prepared with watermelon as a primary ingredient, and may be served chilled. The seeds of the watermelon may be removed, or seedless watermelon may be used, and additional ingredients can include additional fruits, ginger, chili pepper, and sugar.

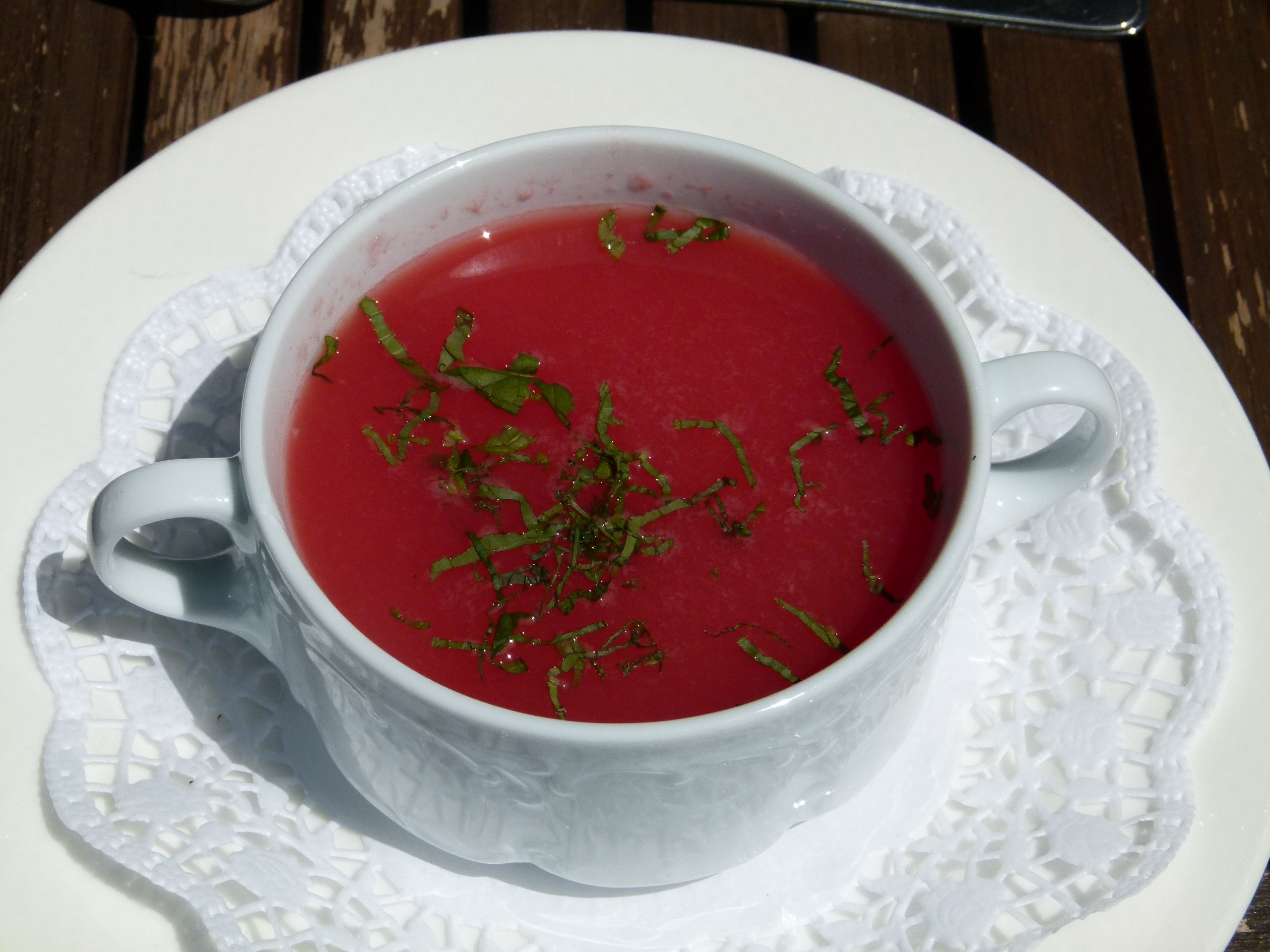
Watermelon soup at a restaurant

=== Winter melon soup ===
Winter melon soup is prepared with winter melon as a primary ingredient and is a part of Chinese cuisine and the cuisine of Hong Kong. It is served often at Chinese banquets. Winter melon soup may have a slightly sweet flavor. Some recipes may use several ingredients in addition to winter melon, which may include ham, carrot, mushrooms, and chicken. Winter melon soup may be served hot, yet has been described as having a cooling effect upon the body when consumed.

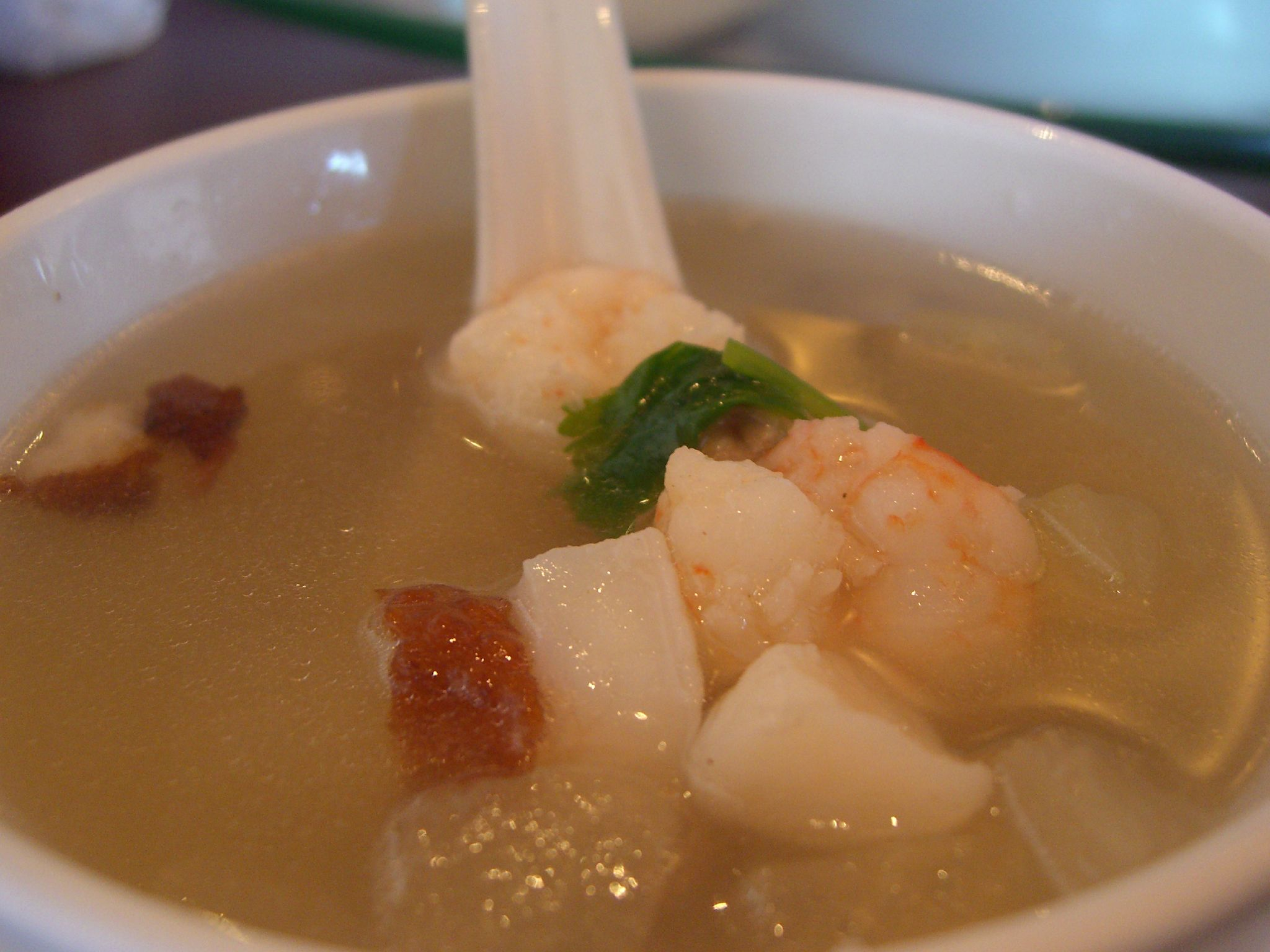
Close-up view of a winter melon and seafood soup

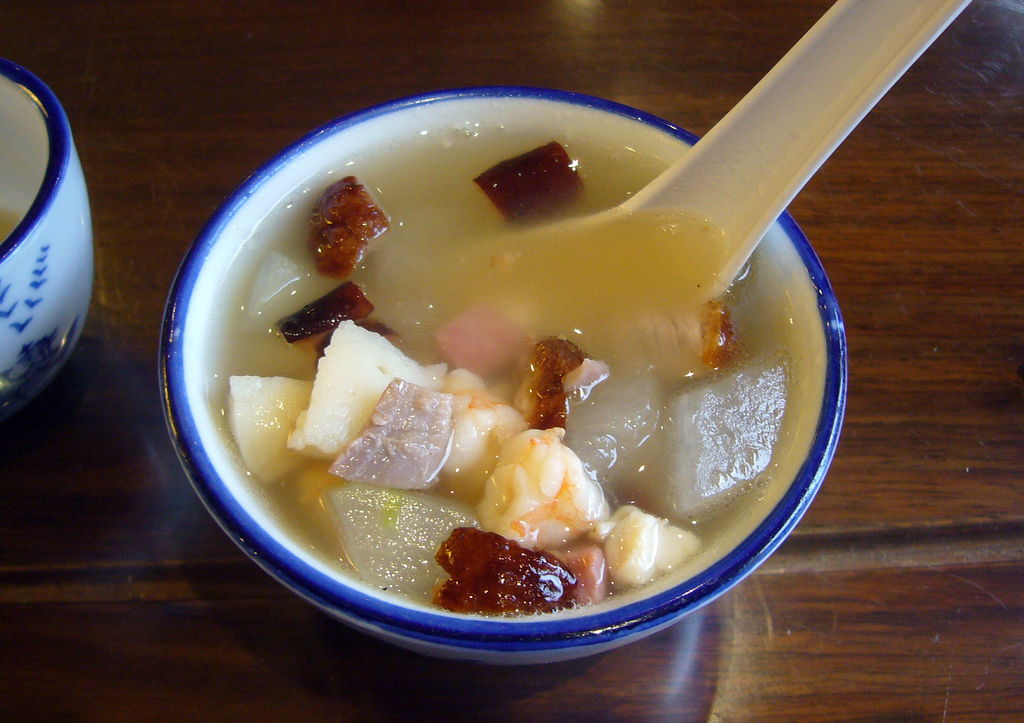
A winter melon soup

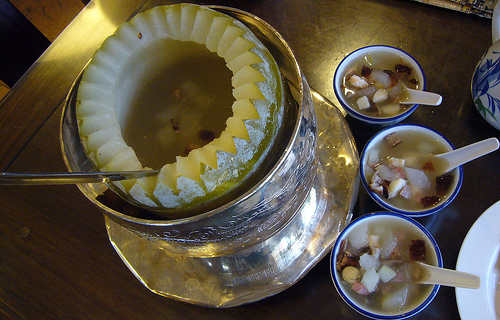
A winter melon soup served from a bowl carved from a melon

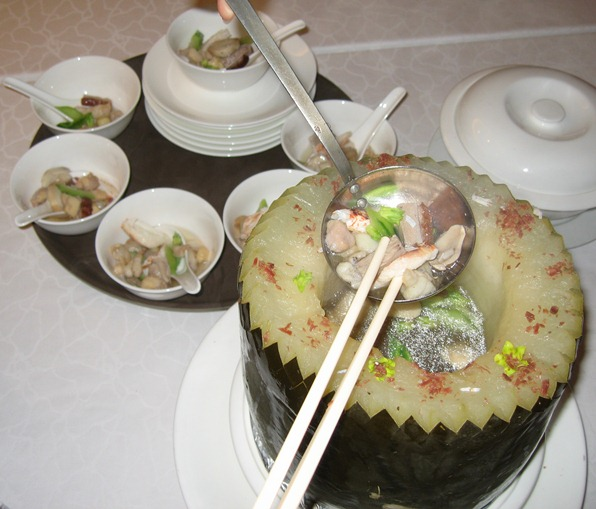
Another winter melon soup served from a carved melon bowl

== See also ==
- Fruit soup
- Pumpkin soup
- List of melon dishes
- List of soups
