= Watermelon seed oil =

Seed oil from Citrullus lanatus

Watermelon seed oil is extracted by pressing from the seeds of the Citrullus lanatus (watermelon). It is particularly common in West Africa, where it is also called ootanga oil.

The common watermelon most likely originated almost 5,000 years ago in the Kalahari Desert. Its wild ancestor, the Kalahari Melon, still grows there, and its seeds are pressed for their oil. Watermelons migrated north through Egypt, and during the Roman era they were cultivated and prized.

Like their wild ancestors, modern domestic watermelon seeds can be pressed for oil. Traditionally, the seeds are extracted from the seed casing, and dried in the sun. Once dried, the seeds are pressed.

Watermelon seed oil contains high amounts of unsaturated fatty acids, primarily linoleic and oleic acids.

Fatty acid composition of watermelon seed oil
Fatty Acid	Percent
Palmitic acid (C16:0)	11.0
Stearic acid (C18:0)	10.0
Oleic acid (C18:1)	15.0
Linoleic acid (C18:2)	63.0

Specifications of watermelon seed oil
Refractive Index (40 °C)	1.4630–1.4670
Iodine value	115–125
Saponification value	190–198
Unsaponifiable matter	1.5% max
Moisture	0.5% max
Colour 1/2" cell (y+5R)	20.0 units

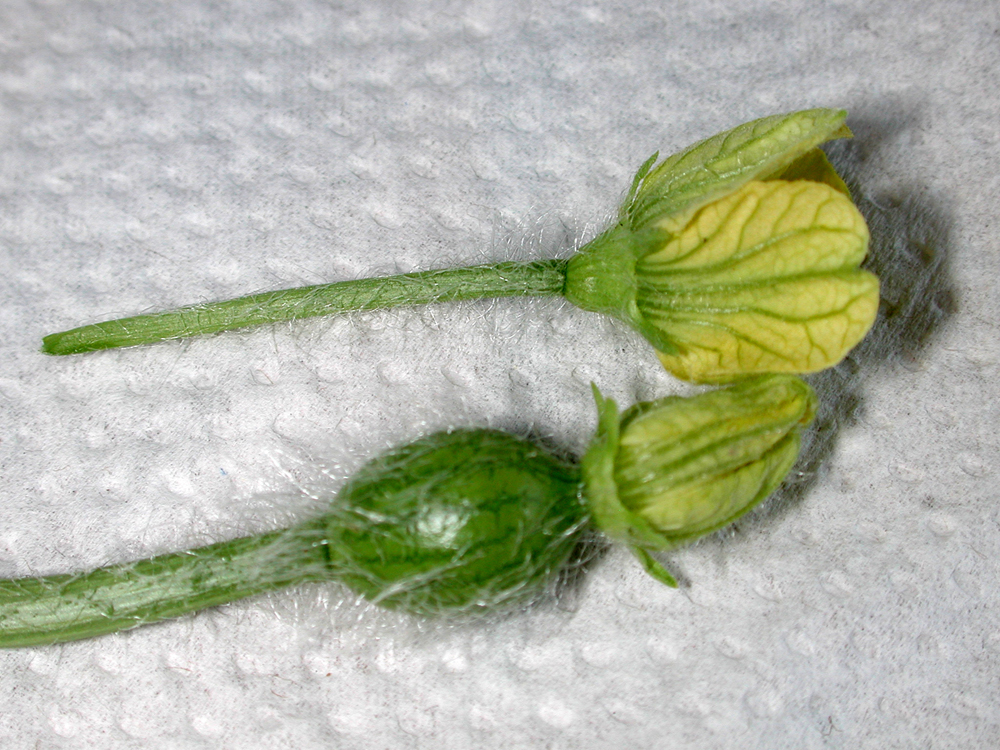
Male (top) and female (bottom) watermelon flowers in side view

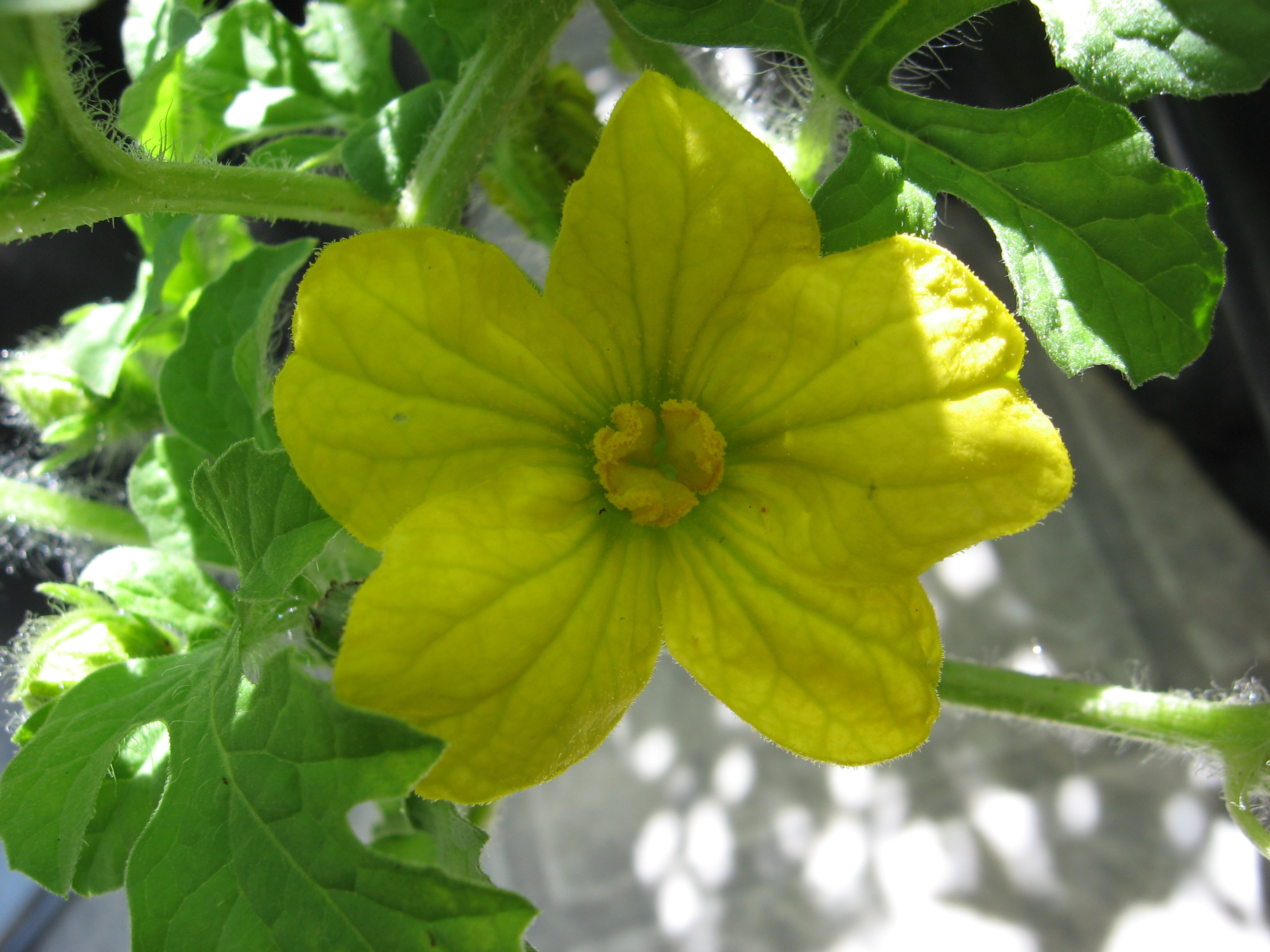
Male watermelon flower

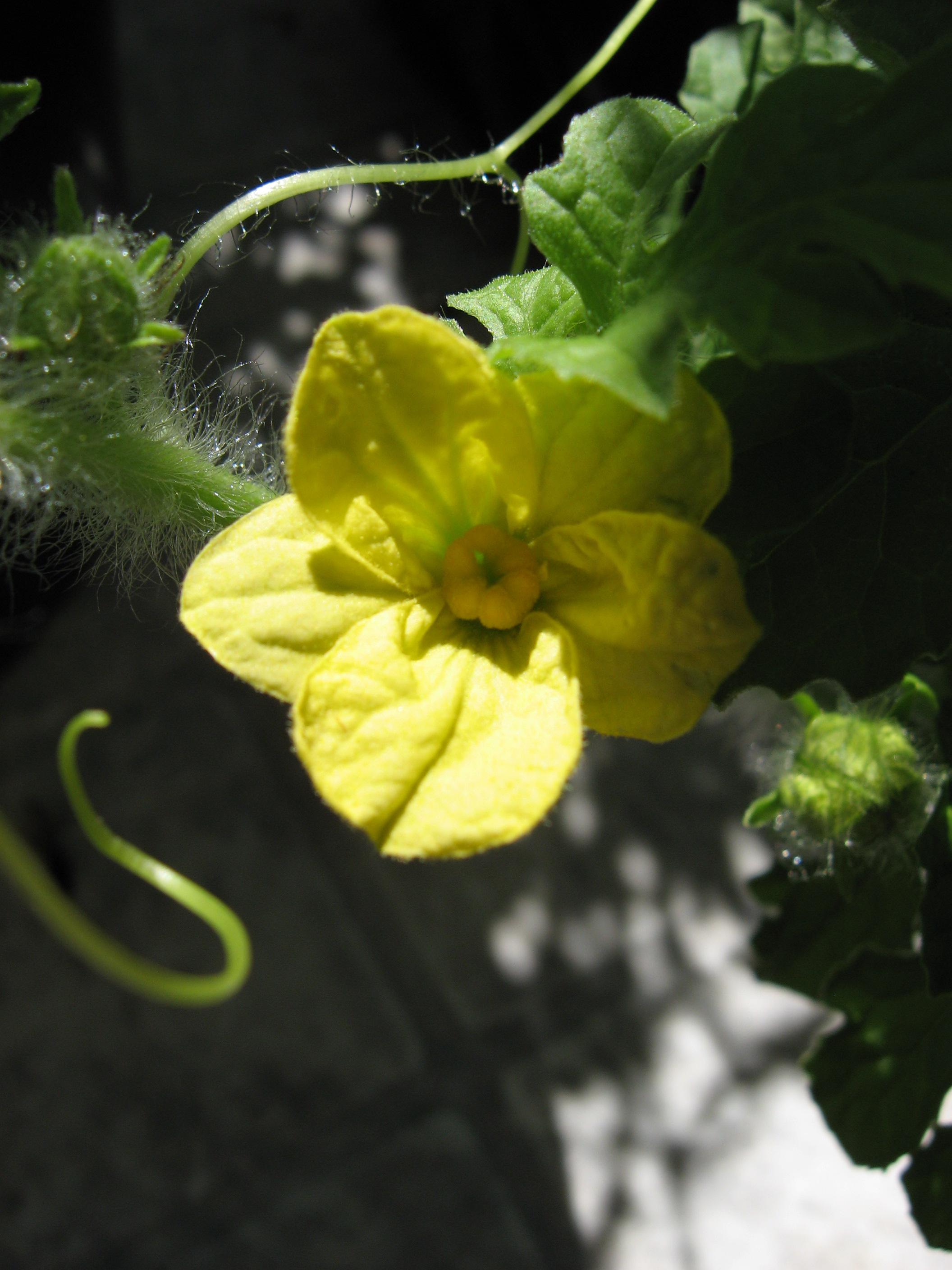
Female watermelon flower

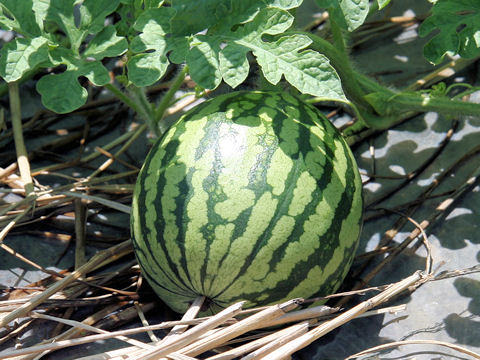
Fruit

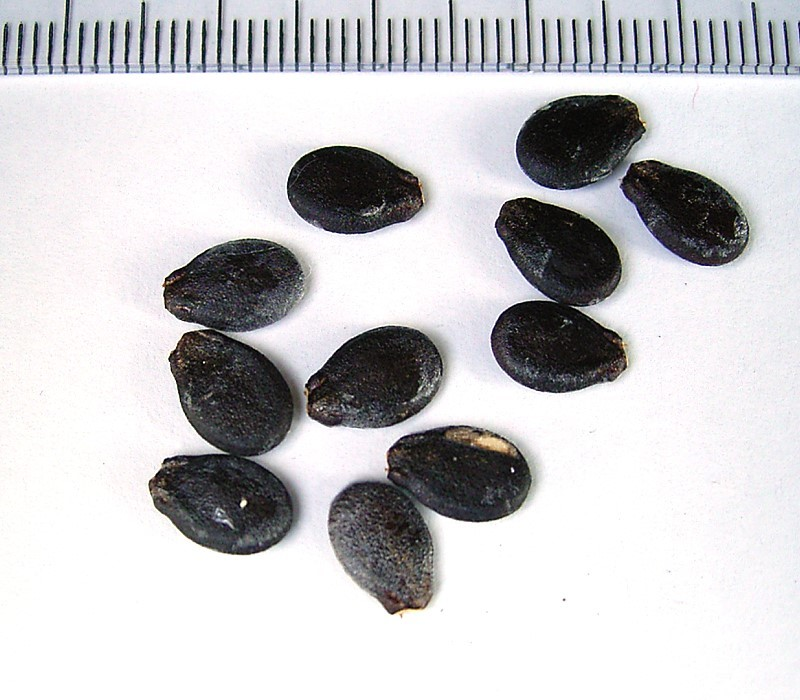
Seeds

== See also ==
- List of melon dishes and foods
