= Xigua lao =

Traditional dish of Beijing

Xi gua lao
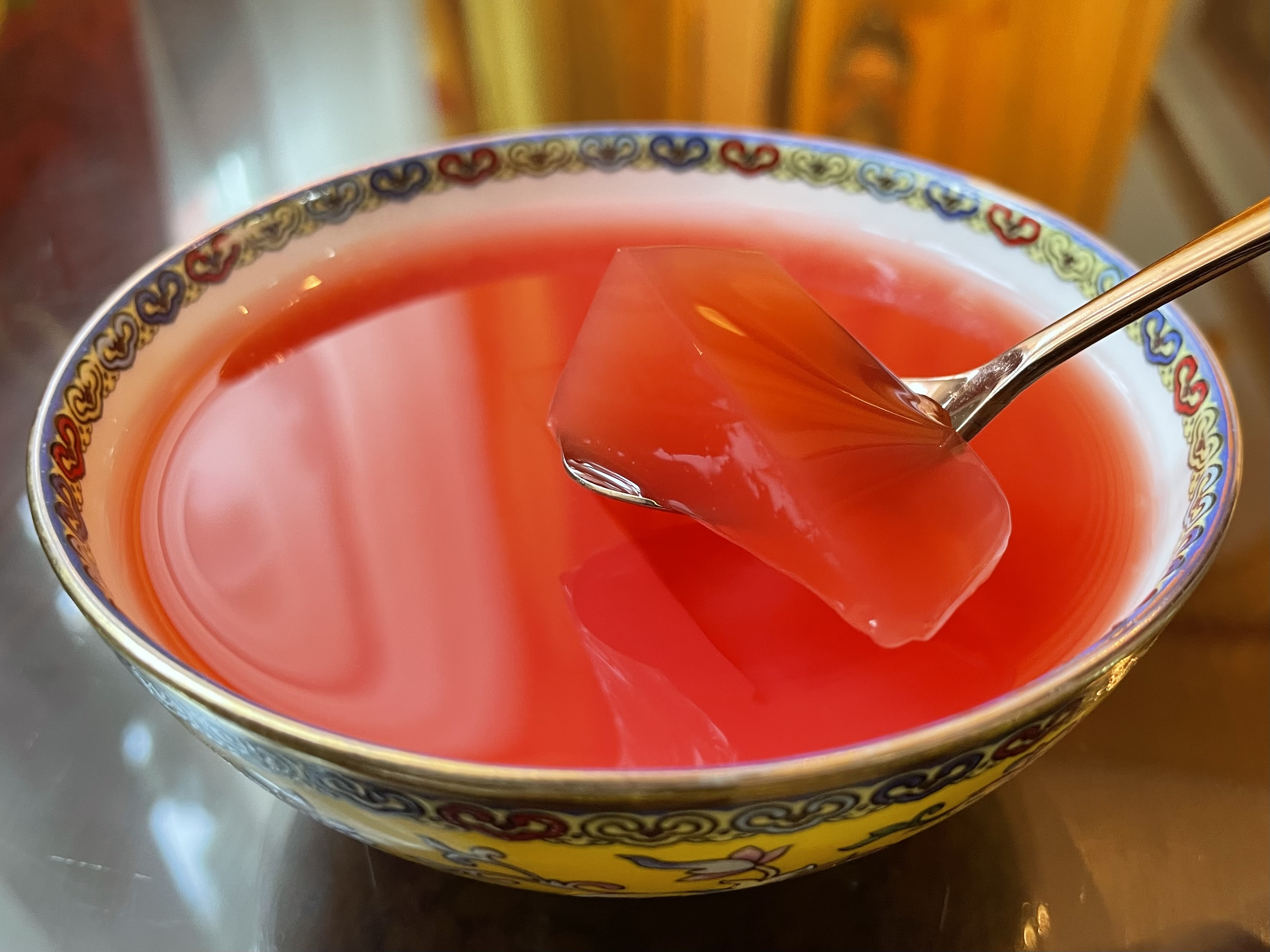
- Watermelon agar jelly
- Type: Pastry
- Place of origin: China
- Region or state: Beijing
- Main ingredients: Watermelon, agar, sugar, cherries, vanilla powder

Xigua lao (Chinese: 西瓜酪; pinyin: xīguālào; lit. 'watermelon jelly') is a traditional dish of Beijing cuisine. It is a thickened and chilled watermelon jelly, often eaten during the summer.

== Preparation ==
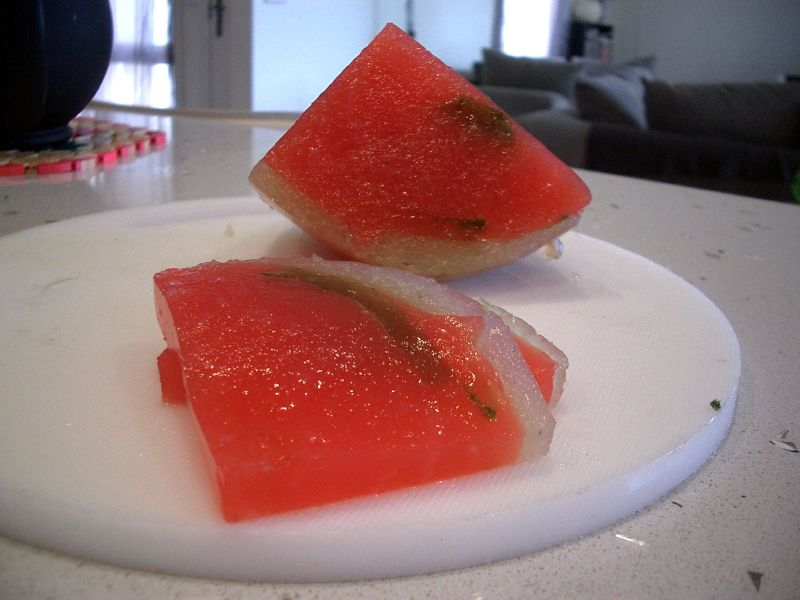

The dish is commonly prepared using watermelon, cherries, agar, sugar and vanilla powder.

Water is mixed with agar, vanilla powder and sugar and boiled into a syrup. The watermelon is crushed to get the juice out of it and mixed with the syrup. The mixture is then chilled until thick and served cold.

== See also ==
- List of Chinese desserts
- List of desserts
- List of melon dishes
