= List of melon dishes =

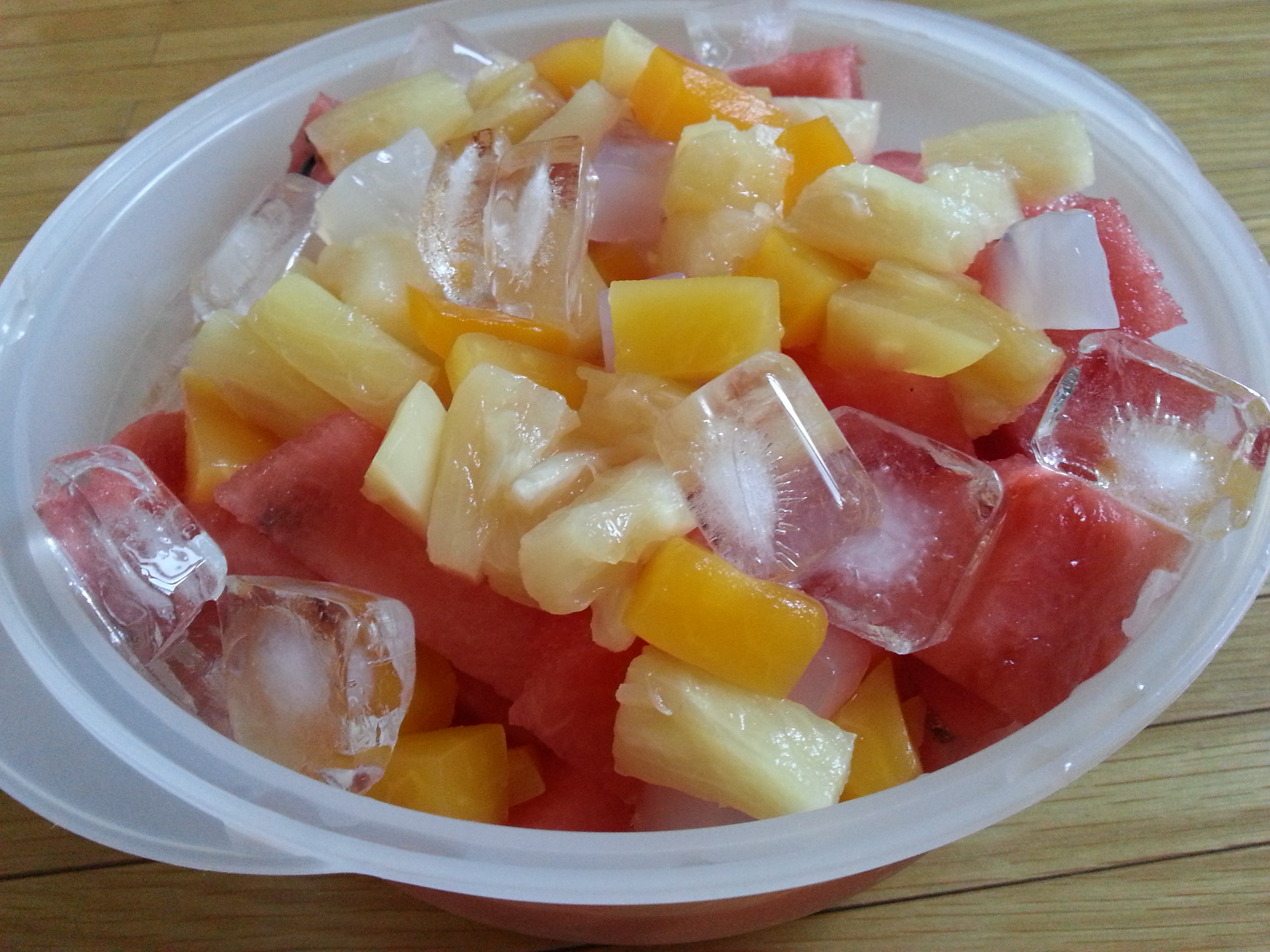
Subak hwachae

This is a list of melon dishes and foods that use melon as a primary ingredient. A melon is any of various plants of the family Cucurbitaceae with edible, fleshy fruit. The word "melon" can refer to either the plant or specifically to the fruit.

== Melon dishes and foods ==
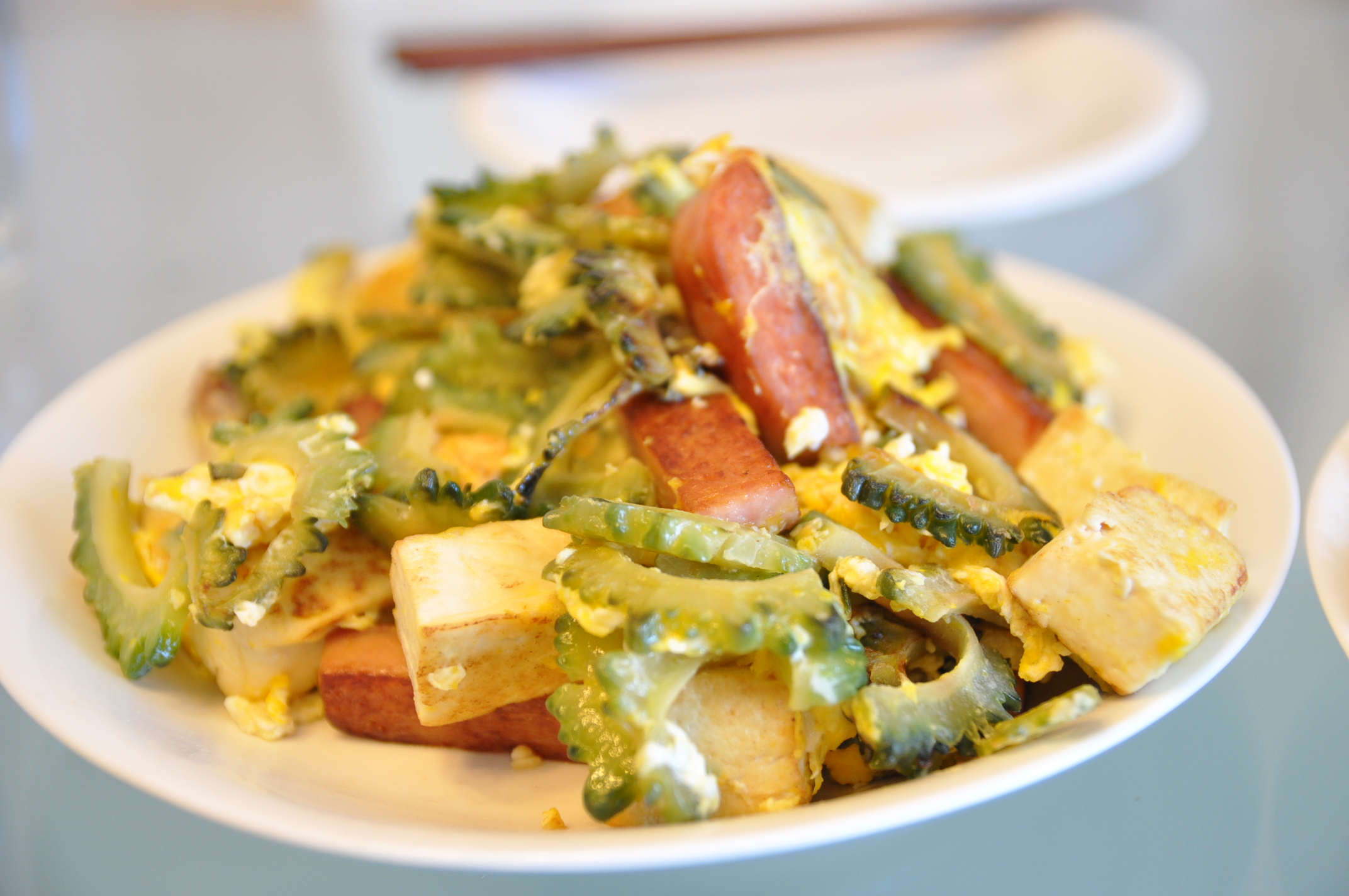
Goya champuru

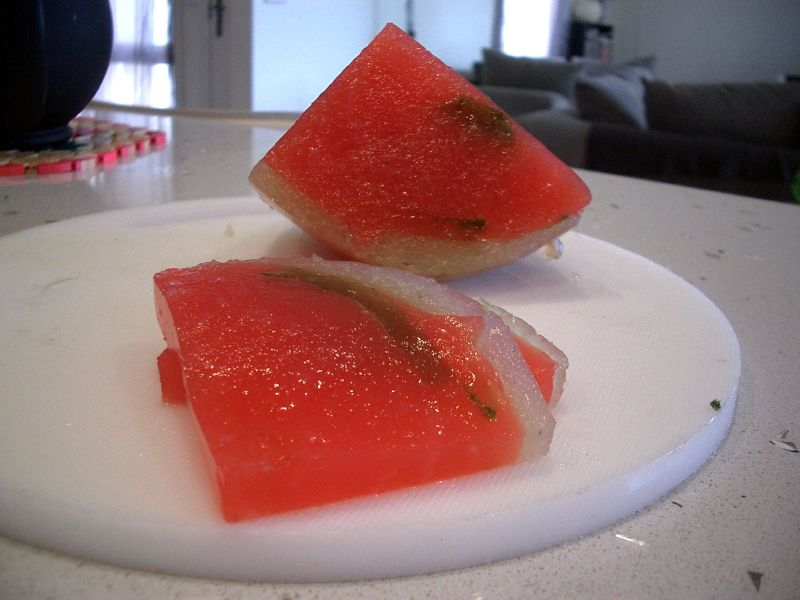
Xi gua lao

- Bogobe jwa lerotse – porridge prepared using the lerotse melon
- Egusi – fat- and protein-rich seeds of certain cucurbitaceous (melon, squash, gourd) plants. Egusi soup is thickened with egusi. Egusi sauce is prepared using egusi
- Gelu di Muluni – Sicilian dessert of ground watermelon flesh cooked with starch and sugar then cooled to solidify, topped with jasmine, candied fruit bits, pistachios and cinnamon
- Gōyā chanpurū – type of chanpurū that is a popular and widely recognized dish in the Okinawan cuisine of the island of Okinawa, Japan. It is a stir fry of bitter melon, tofu, egg and sliced pork or Spam
- Melon ball – balls of melon made using a melon baller
- Melon soup – soup prepared with melon as a primary ingredient
- Melon with ham – small dish or appetizer combining two ingredients
- Pinakbet – usually includes bitter melon, and is an indigenous Filipino dish from the northern regions of the Philippines. Pinakbet is made from mixed vegetables steamed in fish or shrimp sauce
- Stuffed melon – Turkish dish made of melon stuffed with meat (lamb) and rice
- Subak hwachae – variety of hwachae, or Korean traditional fruit punch, made with watermelon
- Sweetheart cake – traditional Cantonese pastry with a thin crust of flaky pastry, and made with a filling of winter melon, almond paste, and sesame, and spiced with five spice powder
- Watermelon rind preserves – made by boiling chunks of watermelon rind with sugar and other ingredients
- Watermelon seed oil – extracted by pressing from the seeds of watermelon
- Watermelon steak – steak-shaped pieces of watermelon, often prepared by grilling
- Wolgwa-chae - a stir-fried vegetable dish featuring oriental pickling melon
- Xi gua lao – watermelon jelly, a traditional dish of Beijing cuisine
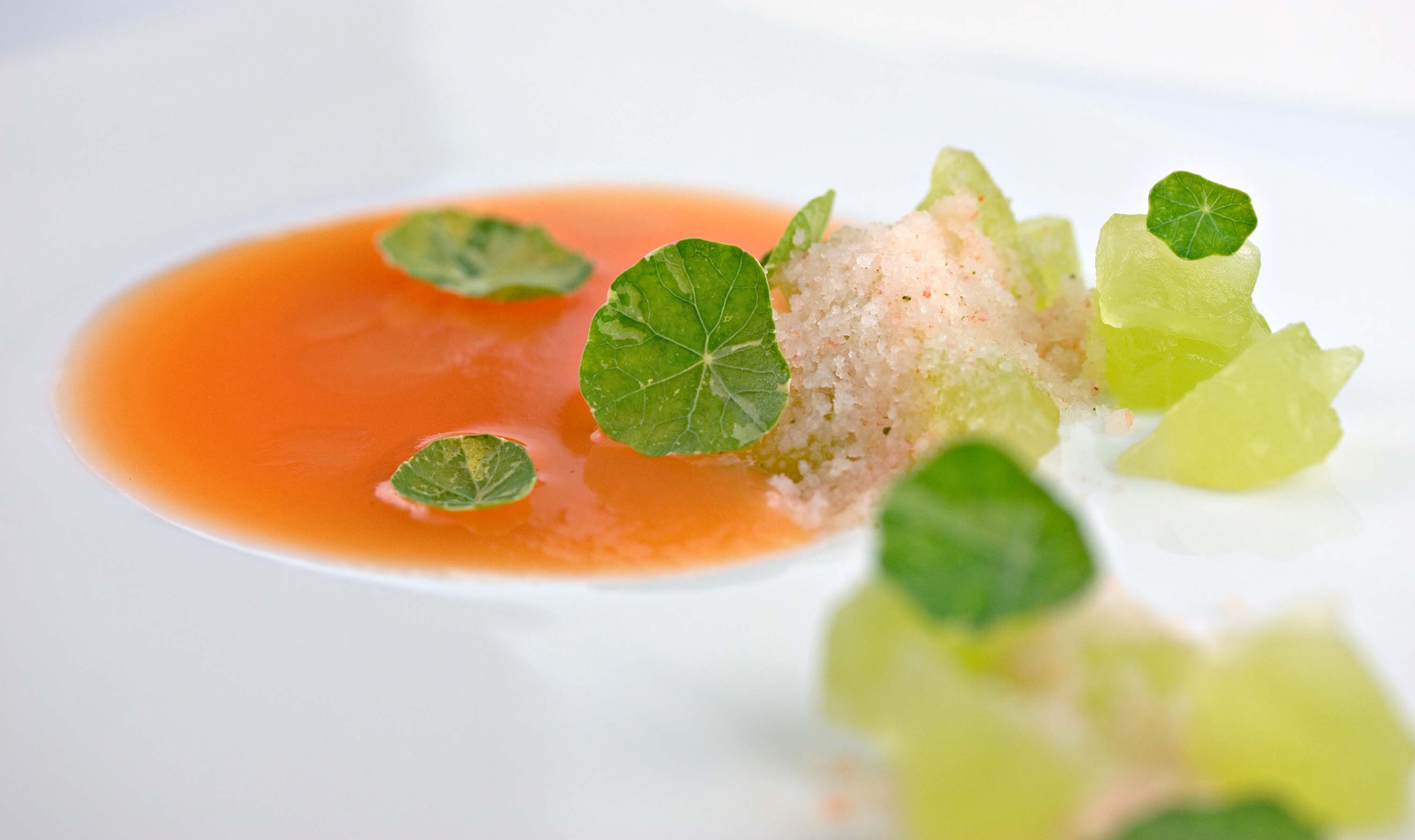
A melon soup prepared with cantaloupe

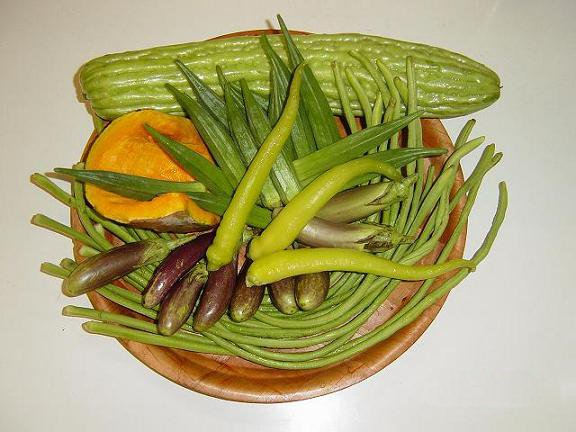
Pinakbet vegetables: bitter melon, calabaza squash, lady's finger, eggplants, string beans, and chili

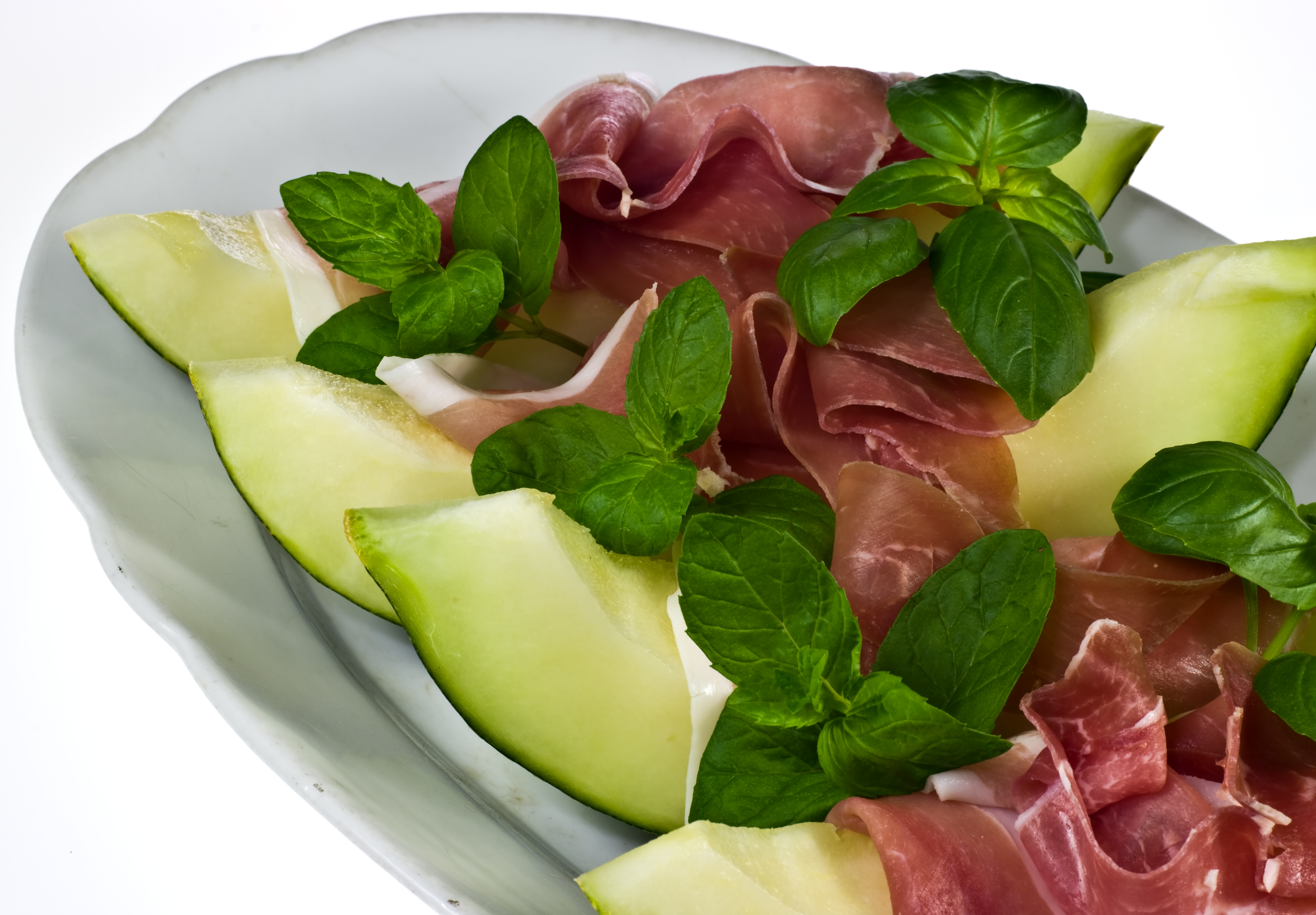
Prosciutto with melon

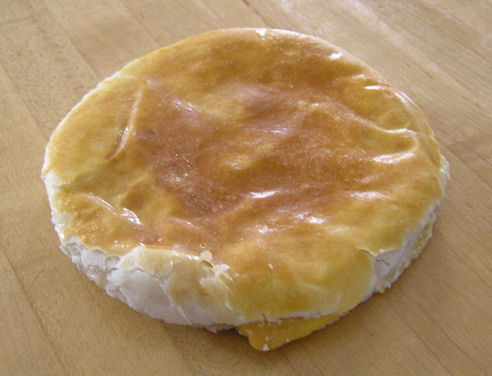
A sweetheart cake

=== Beverages ===
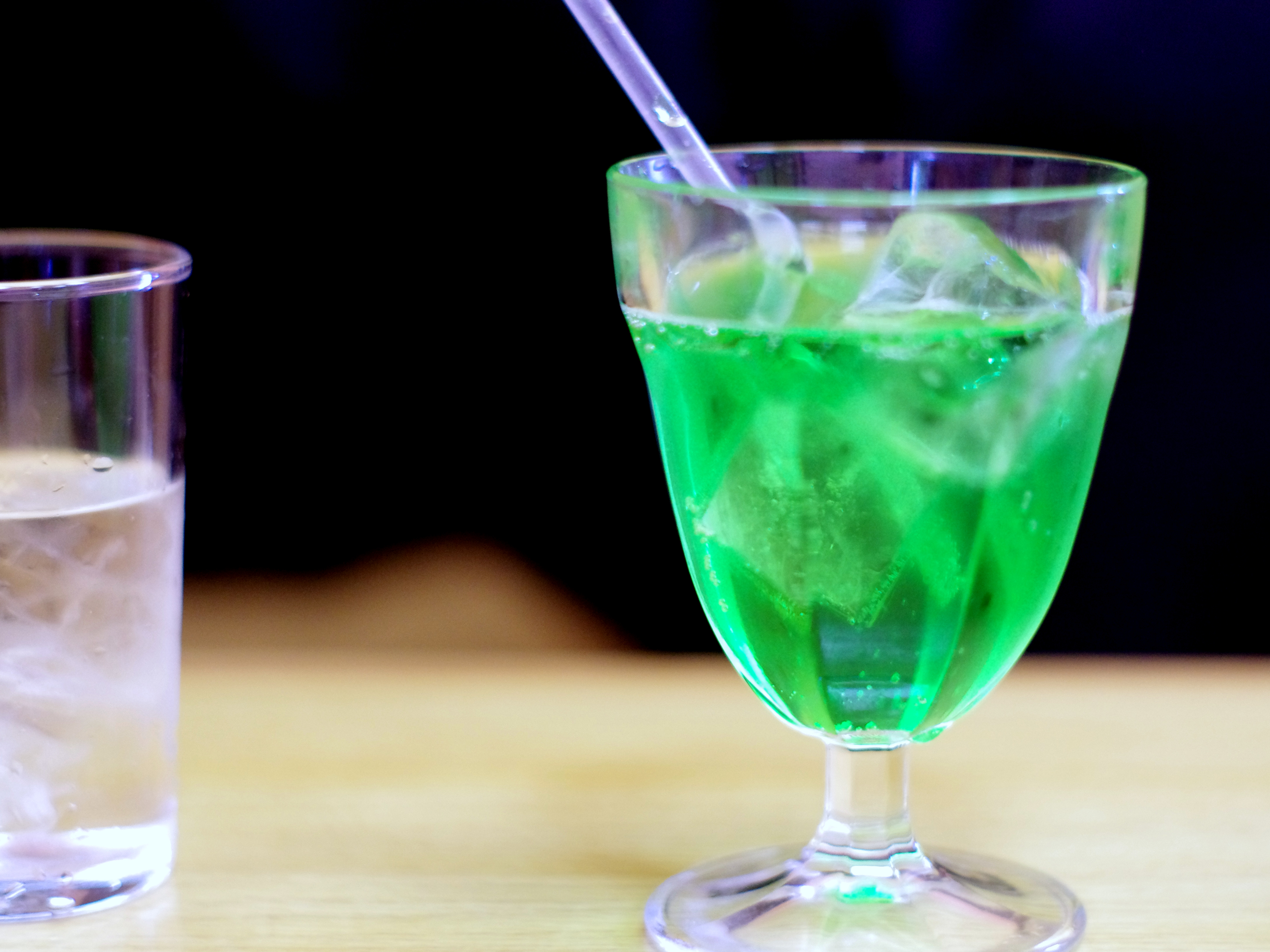
Melon soda

- Melon soda
- Midori – a liqueur prepared using muskmelon

== See also ==
- List of fruit dishes
- List of melons
