= Stuffed melon =

- Alternative names: Melon Dolma
- Course: Main Course
- Place of origin: Arabia & North Africa
- Region or state: Iran, Turkey, Armenia
- Cooking time
- Serving temperature: Hot
- Main ingredients: Melon, Rice, Meat, Onion
- Ingredients generally used: Pine Nuts, Salt, Pepper, Cinnamon

Stuffed melon (Armenian: Միսով Սեխի Դոլմա, Persian: خربزه شکم‌پر, Turkish: Kavun dolması) are made of melon stuffed primarily with meat and rice.

Iranian stuffed melons are made with a mostly hollowed out melon, butter, diced chicken, onions, cinnamon, salt, pepper, couscous or bulgur, apricots and honey.

Armenian stuffed melons are made with hollowed out melon, lamb meat or pork, onions, rice, butter, pine nuts, salt, pepper, currants, grapes and apricots.

== See also ==
- List of melon dishes
- List of stuffed dishes
