= Umngqusho =

South African dish

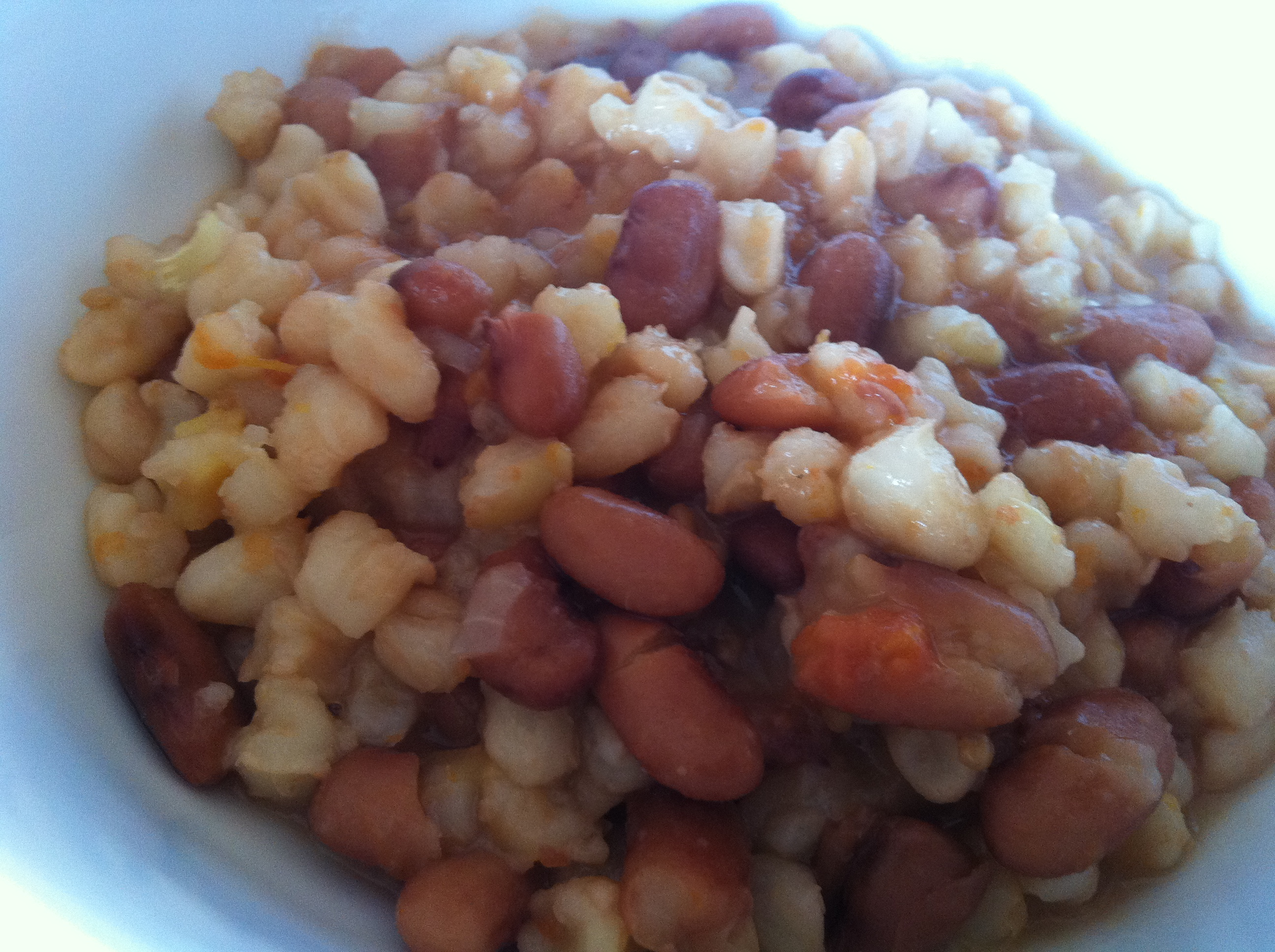
- Umngqusho
- Place of origin: South Africa
- Region or state: Eastern Cape
- Main ingredients: samp with sugar beans, butter, onions, potatoes, chili peppers

Umngqusho (Xhosa pronunciation: [úḿ̩ŋǃṳ̌ːʃo]) is a South African dish based on samp and sugar beans, usually served with hard body chicken which is called umleqwa in isiXhosa. Traditionally a Xhosa staple meal, it has been adopted by other tribes in South Africa as their staple meal as well. This dish is a staple meal for most South African families, referred to as isitambu (stamped corn) by the Zulu people and umngqusho by the Xhosa people.

The Xhosa version, served with butter or fat, was apparently Nelson Mandela's favourite dish.

== See also ==
- List of African dishes
- List of legume dishes
