= Bogobe jwa lerotse =

Type of porridge eaten in Botswana

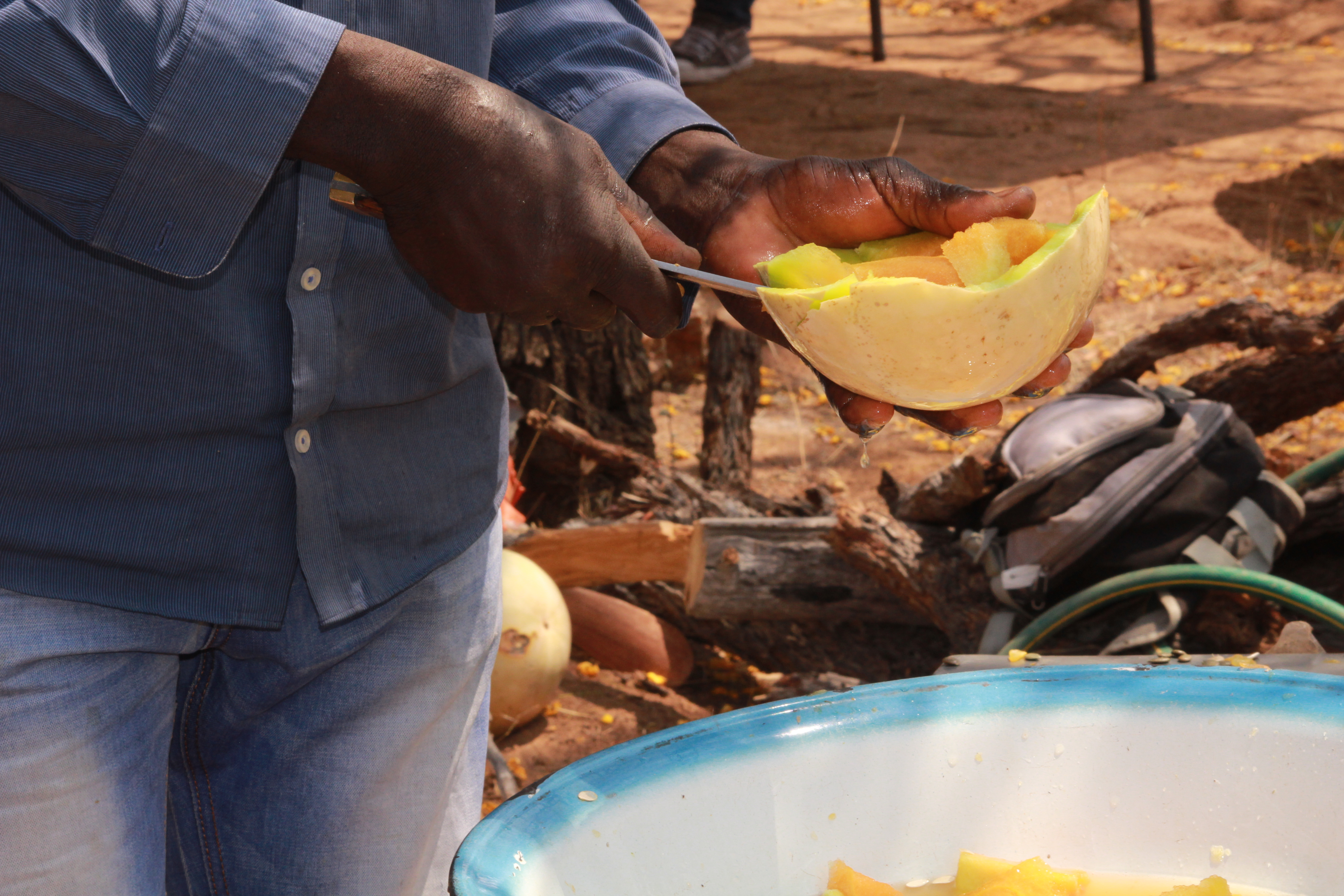
Preparing lerotse

Bogobe jwa lerotse is a type of porridge eaten in Botswana and also a national dish of Botswana, characterized by a delicate flavor imparted by the lerotse melon, a variety of citron melon (citrullus lanatus var. citroides). Lerotse are visually reminiscent of a typical watermelon and distinguished from other citron melon varieties by their orange-colored flesh. They have a neutral flavor when raw, but it imparts a unique flavor to the dish when cooked.

The dish is typically stirred with a traditional wooden whisk, called a lehetho, and has a porridge-like consistency when fully cooked. It is often consumed at weddings and other social gatherings.

Its key ingredient is the lerotse melon, a less-sweet variety of watermelon indigenous to Botswana which is more similar in taste to the cucumber when raw. Along with the lerotse, which is chopped into pieces and boiled, the dish includes sorghum meal and sour milk.

== Ingredients ==
- ½ of one lerotse (melon)
- 1 kg bopi jwa mabele (sorghum)
- 1 cup madila (sour milk)
- Mayonnaise (optional in place of madila)
- Water

== See also ==
- List of melon dishes
- Botswana cuisine
