= Watermelon steak =

Cooked slice of watermelon

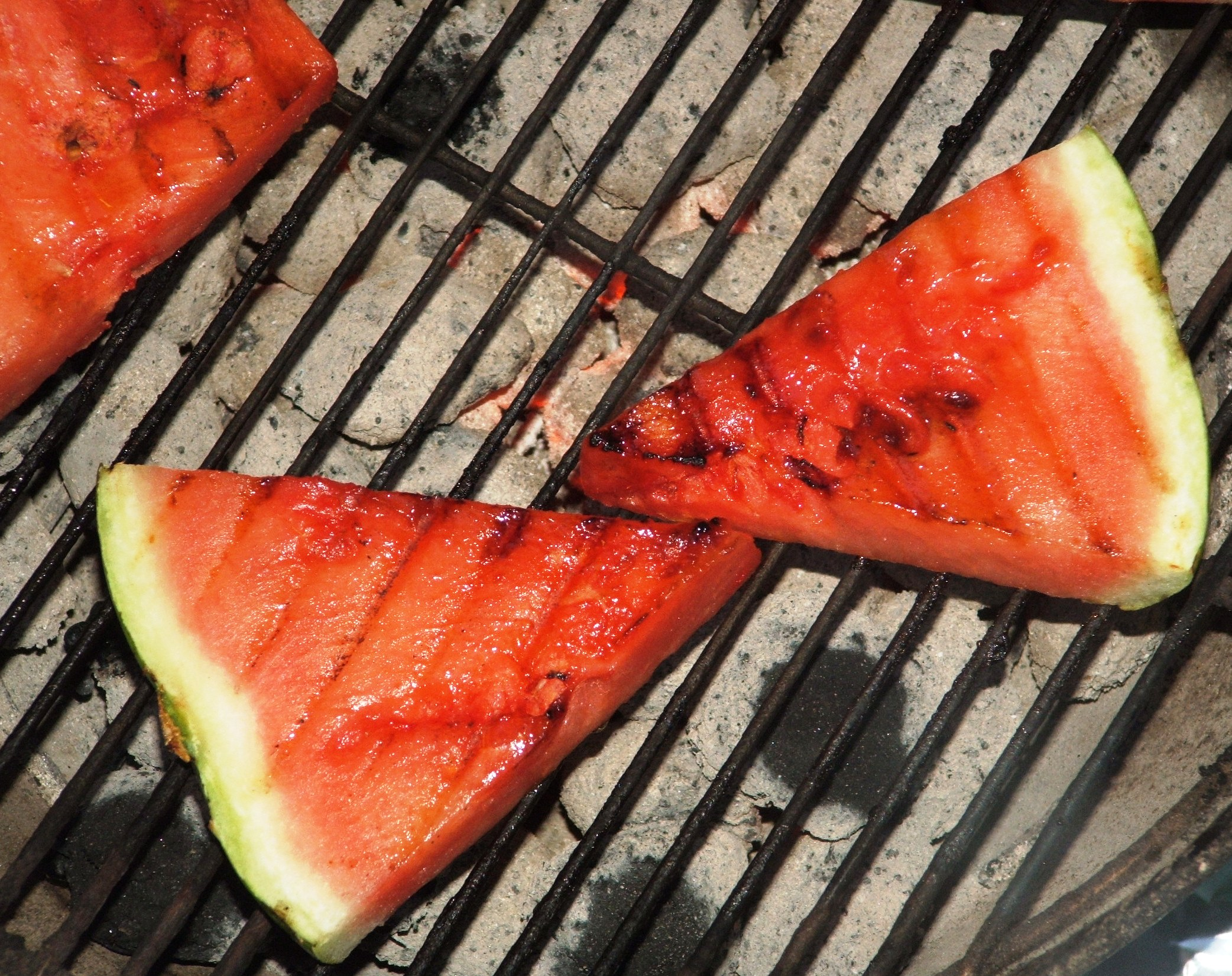
- Watermelon steaks on the grill
- Main ingredients: Watermelon
- Variations: pan frying, baking, or roasting

Watermelon steaks are cooked slices of watermelon. Cookbooks sometimes suggest watermelon steak as a meat substitute for vegetarians. However, watermelon is not a nutritional substitute for traditional steak, as it is lacking in protein and other nutrients found in meat.

== Preparation ==
Slices of watermelon are typically prepared by either grilling, pan frying, baking, or roasting. Depending on the method, cooking can take a few minutes to over two hours. When well cooked, most of the fruit's water evaporates, concentrating flavor and texture while leaving the watermelon tender.

== Texture and flavor ==
If the watermelon is baked, the resulting texture can be like that of raw fish. Boston Phoenix Writer Robert Nadeau compared a grilled watermelon to seared, raw tuna. He added that the flavor of the fruit "isn't sweet, although it isn't meaty either, but enough of the browning comes through to make it a little like a piece of meat." Cookery writers Andrew Schloss and David Joachim described the result as "kind of like a fillet steak."

== See also ==
- List of melon dishes
