= Japanese slipper =

Drink made from Midori, Cointreau and lemon juice

Japanese Slipper
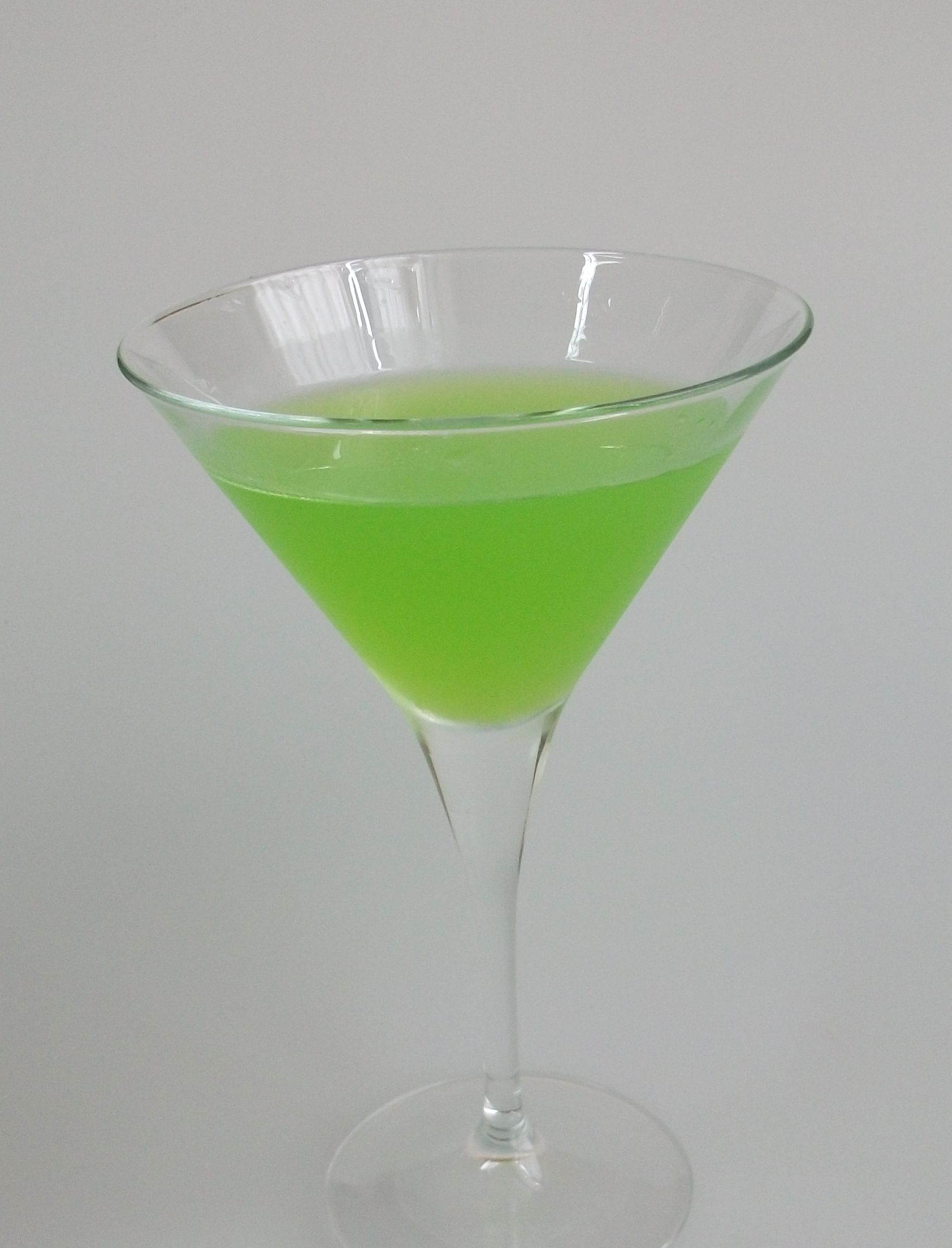
- Type: Cocktail
- Ingredients: 3 cl (1 part) Midori; 3 cl (1 part) Cointreau; 3 cl (1 part) lemon juice
- Base spirit: Midori, triple sec
- Standard drinkware: Cocktail glass
- Standard garnish: Honeydew melon slice
- Served: Straight up: chilled, without ice
- Preparation: Shake together in a mixer with ice. Strain into glass, garnish and serve.

A Japanese slipper is a drink made from Midori, Cointreau, and lemon juice. It was created in 1984 by French bartender Jean-Paul Bourguignon at Mietta's Restaurant in Melbourne.

== History ==
Bourgignon invented the Japanese slipper while working as a bartender at Mietta's in Melbourne. Having received a bottle of Midori from a Suntory sales representative, Bourgignon tried mixing it with Cointreau and lemon juice to cut through its sweetness, and the drink was born. The drink quickly proved a hit and spread through Australia, credited by Bourguignon to his continued promotion of the drink throughout his career.

The Japanese Slipper is referenced in literature as early as 1988: "You might care for one of the other current favorites — a Toblerone, a Japanese Slipper, or a Mind Eraser [...] or a Melon Bullet (Midori, Mainstay, Cointreau, lemon juice)".

== Preparation ==
Ingredients:

25ml Midori

25ml Cointreau

25ml Lemon Juice

or equal parts of smaller/larger measurements.

Build in shaker, shake well with ice, then fine strain into chilled coupe glass. Garnish with slice of honeydew lemon + cherry sunk in glass.

A variation can be made by replacing the Cointreau with vodka.
