= Melon ball =

Utensil to scoop out balls of melon

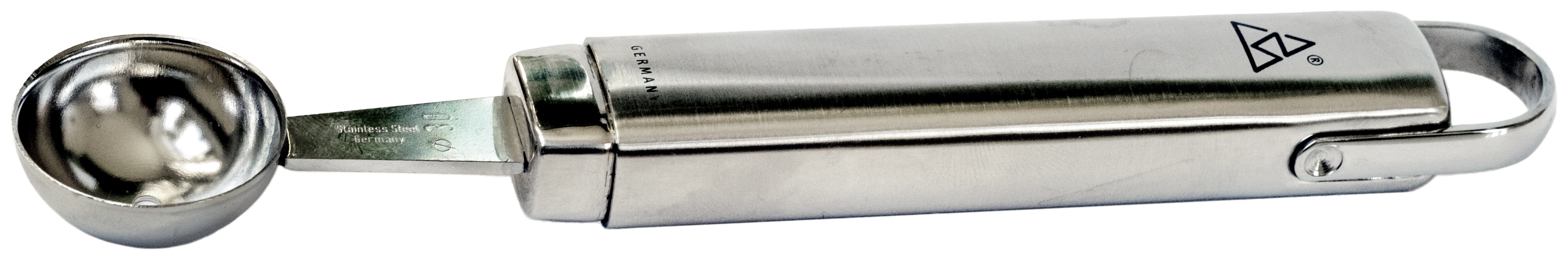
A melon baller

Melon ballers are utensils to make balls of melon from a scoop with a diameter from around 1 centimeter to 3 centimeters (about 3/8 inch to 1 inch). These are generally used to make fruit salad.

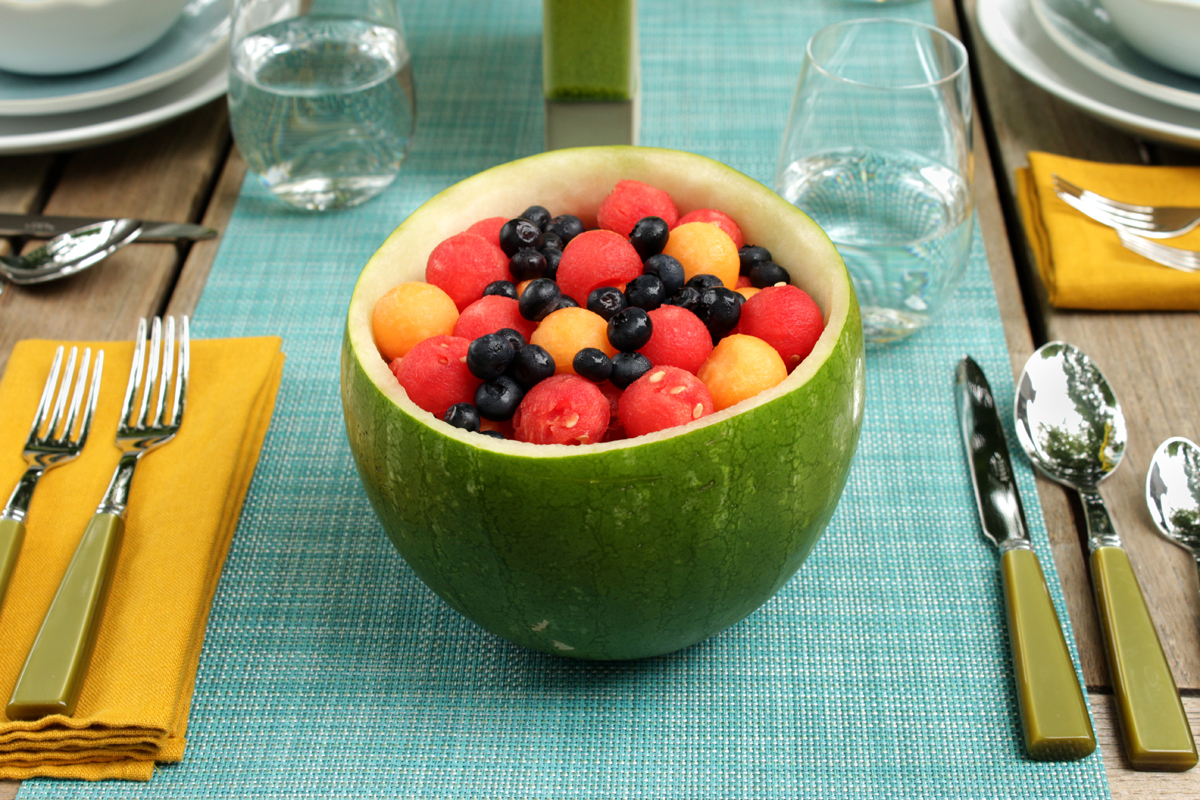
Cantaloupe and watermelon balls in a fruit salad

Melon balls are made by pressing them into the melon's flesh and rotating. It can also be used to cut other soft fruit and ice cream. The diameter of a melon baller's bowl varies from around 1 centimeter to 3 centimeters (about 3/8 inch to 1 inch), and it is typically made of stainless steel with a handle of wood, metal, or hard plastic. Some varieties have the handle in the middle and a different-sized bowl on each end, and the bowl typically has a small hole in the middle to allow air and juice through. It is more commonly known as a prepping utensil. Melon ballers can be used for a variety of melons; like watermelon, cantaloupe, or honeydew. They typically are multifunctional utensils. They are also used for balling other soft fleshy fruits, trying small bits of other foods such as ice cream, or making chocolate truffles.

== See also ==
- List of melon dishes
- Melon
