= Kalahari melon oil =

Oil from the seeds of Kalahari melon

Kalahari melon oil is a plant oil extracted from the seeds of the Kalahari melon (Citrullus vulgaris), which is endemic to the Kalahari Desert, spanning Namibia, Botswana and South Africa. Being one of 1,200 varieties of melon, Kalahari melon oil is distinct from regular watermelon seed oil. The seed of the Kalahari melon consists of approximately 50% oil, 35% protein and 5% dietary fibre.

== INCI Name ==
A common misconception is that the INCI name of Kalahari melon oil is different from watermelon oil, that the former is known as Citrullus lanatus seed oil, and the latter Citrullus vulgaris seed oil. Both terms have been used interchangeably to describe the sweet, red watermelon, and the bitter Kalahari melon.

Uncertainty about the scientific name is recognised by the Personal Care Products Council and the Cosmetics Ingredients and Substances Database of the European Union, who record both INCI names as synonyms of one another.

== Common names ==
Kalahari melon oil may be called tsamma (Damara/Nama), wild watermelon, bitterboela, karkoer (Afrikaans), or makatane (Setswana) or mokaté oil.

== History ==
The Kalahari melon is considered the original wild watermelon and the evolutionary ancestor of the common, sweet watermelon, distinguishable by its smaller size, pale yellow flesh and bitter taste. The plant is widely considered to be a weed, where it grows wildly, particularly in Central and Eastern Namibia, Botswana and the North West, Free State, Western Cape and Northern Cape provinces of South Africa.

The Kalahari melon has been used for over 4,000 years by the San people of the Kalahari. The word Kalahari is derived from the Tswana word Kgala, meaning "the great thirst", therefore despite the melon’s bitter taste it has served as a crucial source of water, especially as the water‐rich melons mature in the dry season, when surface water is unavailable. Although the melons were fed on by a wide range of animals, they were used to a greater extent by larger animals as a supplementary water supply. It is said that San can survive for six weeks in the desert on Kalahari melons alone. Additionally, the San would grind the seed into a paste and use it to protect their skin against the harsh deserts elements, while the pulp mixed with water was used as a sunblock. The seed-meal also has a history of use as a cosmetic. After grinding, it was chewed and moistened with saliva, then smeared over the skin for a healthy, blemish-free complexion.

== Appearance ==
Kalahari melon seed oil is liquid at room temperature, naturally light yellow in colour and has a nutty flavour and odour.

== Chemistry ==
Physical properties of Kalahari melon oil

Specific gravity at 20 °C	0.92 ± 0.001
Refractive index at 25 °C	1.472 ± 0.001
Iodine value	118.61 ± 1.03
p-Anisidine value	1.69 ± 0.17
Acid value	1.63 ± 0.059
Peroxide value	2.98 ± 0.20
Saponification value	187.86 ± 2.42

The oil is naturally high in linoleic acid, an omega 6, polyunsaturated essential fatty acid which is critical for cell biology but cannot be made by the human body, so it must be supplemented through diet or applied topically to the skin.

Kalahari melon oil is the only oil that contains polyunsaturated fatty acids which are also stable, primarily because it contains vitamin E. The major component is γ-tocopherol (70.56 mg/100 g), followed by α-tocopherol (25.94 mg/100 g). Total tocopherol concentrations up to 2,742.4 mg/kg have been reported in the literature and commercially. These high values provide antioxidant properties and a long shelf life for industrial, pharmaceutical and cosmetic purposes.

Fatty acids present in Kalahari melon oil

Fatty acid	Omega	Carbon atoms:double bonds	Percent %
Linoleic acid	6	C18:2	56.8–70.8 %
Oleic acid	9	C18:1	13.03–17.1%
Stearic acid	NA	C18:0	5.6–13.8 %
Palmitic acid	NA	C16:0	8.8–15.7 %
Linolenic acid	3	C18:3	0.46–1.6 %
Myristic acid	NA	C14:0	0.78 %

Phytosterols are present in the oil, including β-sitosterol (485.49 mg/100 g), campesterol (130.41 mg/100 g) and stigmasterol (25.87 mg/100 g). The phenolic acids present are gallic, protocatechuic, p-hydroxybenzoic, vanillic, caffeic, syringic (trace), p-coumaric, and ferulic acids. These key secondary metabolites exhibit efficient peroxyl-radical scavenging activity and potentially have beneficial pharmacological effects.

== Uses ==
Cold pressed Kalahari melon oil is a newly emerging ingredient, used in a variety of European and American cosmetic and hair-care industries for product development due to its stability, moisturizing and skin conditioning properties. The oil is non-irritant to human skin.

== Extraction ==
The Kalahari melon is a trailing herb of up to 10 m (33 ft) long with broad leaves and yellow flowers. The fruit, which varies in size and colour, contains smooth compressed seeds of a black or yellowish white colour. To extract oil from the seeds, the seeds are dried to reduce the water contents. Oil extraction yields vary, depending on the extraction method.

=== Cold Pressed extraction ===
This process is the preferred method for commercial use, and involves mechanical extraction, without heat or chemical treatment. Cold pressed seed oil is obtained by pressing the raw, dried seeds, using a screw-press. The oil temperature during the pressing process should not exceed 60 °C (140 °F), to preserve the bioactive components present.

=== Soxhlet-based extraction ===
In this technique, simple apparatus and different non-polar solvents, including n-hexane and chloroform are used for the extraction of oil. Extraction with n-hexane yielded 41.3% - 43.6%. Oil yield was reported to be primarily affected by the solvent/kernel ratio, rather than by time and temperature.

=== Supercritical fluid based extraction (SFE) ===
Extraction by supercritical CO_{2} significantly increases the potential yield obtained from the kernel. With variable parameters of pressure and temperature the oil yield ranges from 49% to 76.3%. It involves mixing seeds or powder with glass wool in a definite ratio of 25:1 (w/w) in a cartridge, which is inserted into a thermal-controlled extraction cell. A flow of liquified CO_{2} is introduced via a piston pump at a controlled temperature and pressure. The extract is separated from the CO_{2} phase and collected at atmospheric pressure and ambient temperature. Solvent extraction techniques, such as SFE and Soxhletbased extraction, are popular for academic research, but are less preferred in the commercial production of the oil owing to the use of solvents.

== Impacts ==
=== Environmental ===
The Kalahari melon is highly adapted to surviving the drought of the arid, desert environment, where it needs very little water to survive. It grows easily, away from forests, in underutilised areas where other commercial crops struggle to grow. The drought-resistance of the plant and its high oil yield makes this melon species a sustainable resource for commercial use.

The seasonal plant produces one crop per year, allowing for sustainable harvesting on a large scale, because production can expand and contract according to market demand, without having a significant impact on the environment. Kalahari melon oil has a sustainability advantage over tree-derived oils used for cosmetic oil production, such as argan, baobab, marula or almond trees, which need many years to mature before they bear fruit, and so adjust to the elastic demands of the global market with much more difficulty.

=== Social ===
The production of Kalahari melon oil has enormous potential for socioeconomic impact. A survey conducted by Agri SA to assess drought impact on farming and job creation, found that since 2018, the agricultural sector lost 31,000 jobs in provinces severely affected by the drought and lost approximately R7 billion. The Kalahari melon’s drought-resistant biology can secure traditional livelihoods within South Africa’s agricultural sector, which have been lost to drought.

Use of Kalahari melon oil from indigenous sources, into value-added products, allows for the improvement of better living standards for the rural communities who are the suppliers and/or producers of the resource.
