= Midori (liqueur) =

Melon liquor

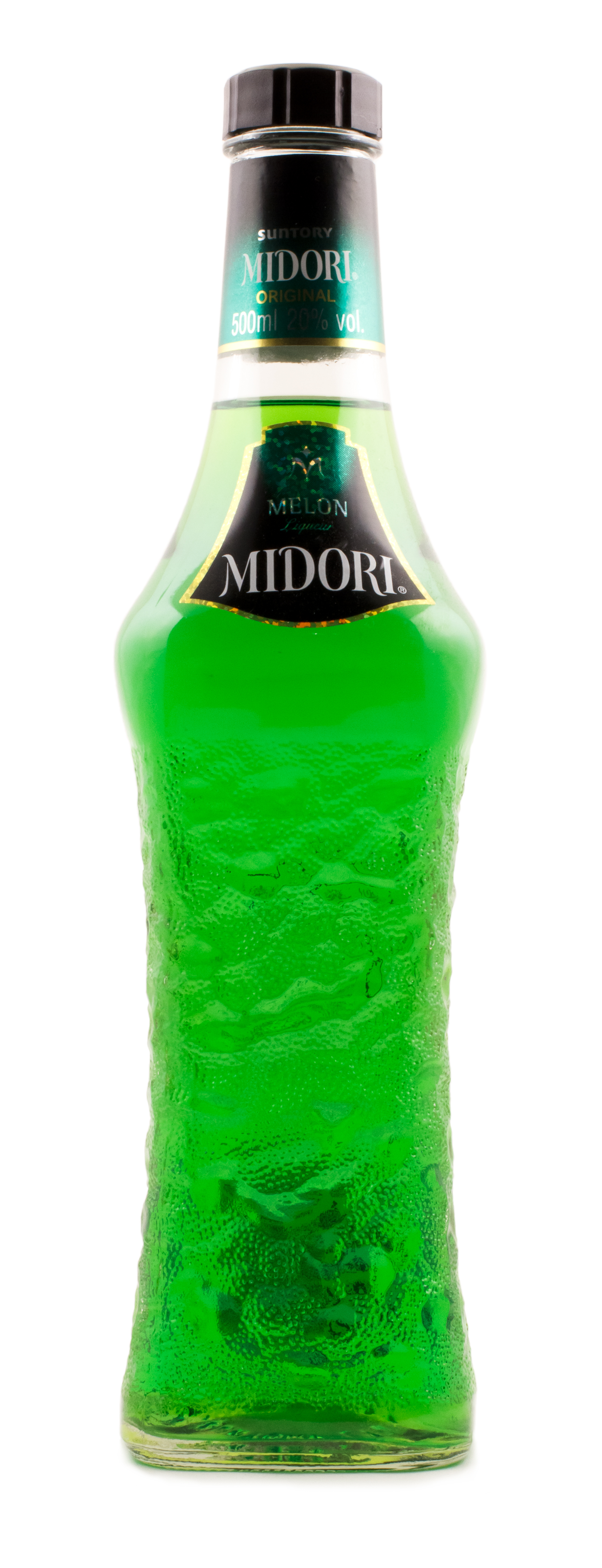
- A pre-2013 bottle of Midori with holographic style label and clear glass
- Type: Liqueur
- Manufacturer: Suntory
- Origin: Japan
- Introduced: 1964
- Alcohol by volume: 20–21%
- Website: midori-world.com

Midori (Japanese: ミドリ (緑); lit. 'green') is a sweet, bright green-colored liqueur made by Suntory, flavored with Yubari King and muskmelon.

It is produced in Japan, the United States, Mexico, and France.

It was first released in 1964 under the name "Hermes Melon Liqueur", but changed its name to "Midori" in 1978. It was made exclusively in Japan until 1987.

Midori is typically 20–21% alcohol by volume.

As it is extremely sweet, Midori is not usually taken "straight"; it is generally used in a cocktail.

== Cocktails including Midori ==
Some of the more popular cocktail concoctions that include Midori include:

- Japanese slipper — Midori, Cointreau, and lemon juice
- Scooby snack — Midori, heavy cream, banana liqueur, coconut rum, and pineapple juice, whipped cream topping, and (optional) Scooby Snack biscuit on top
- Midori Sour — Midori, vodka, lemon juice, lime juice, and soda water

== History ==
In 1964, Suntory released "Hermes Melon Liqueur" in Japan.

In 1978, it was renamed "Midori" for its release to the US market at Studio 54 in New York City, during a party held by the cast, crew, and producers of Saturday Night Fever (1977).

By 1983, Midori was distributed in 20 countries.

In 1987, Suntory began producing Midori in countries outside of Japan.

In 2013, following consumer research, Suntory reduced the sugar content and began producing Midori with a redesigned label and frosted glass bottle.

== See also ==
- List of melon dishes
