= Dikgobe =

- Alternative names: Izinkobe in Zulu
- Place of origin: Botswana, South Africa, Lesotho
- Main ingredients: samp, beans

Dikgobe, also known as izinkobe, is a South African word for samp and beans cooked together. The dish is commonly served at Setswana celebrations of life, such as marriage, and those marking death, the passage out of life. For funerals, dikgobe is one of the two acceptable starches to be served, with sorghum as the other.
