= Samp =

Preparation of dried corn from Africa

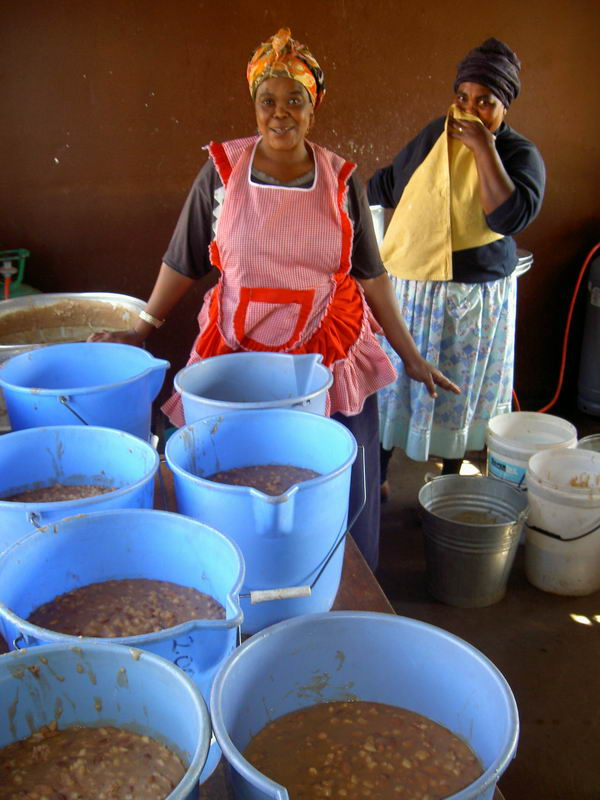
- Buckets of samp
- Place of origin: South Africa/Zambia (Barotseland)

Samp is a food made from dried corn kernels that have been pounded and chopped until broken, but not as finely ground as mealie-meal or mielie rice. The coating around the kernel loosens and is removed during the pounding and stamping process. It is eaten across Southern Africa and by the Lozi and Tonga people of Zambia with sugar and sour milk. It can also be served with gravy and various additives. It is cooked with beans in the Xhosa variant of umngqusho and sometimes eaten with chakalaka. It can also be served with beef, lamb, poultry and in stuffings.

"Samp" is of Native American origin, coming from the Narragansett word "nasàump." New Englanders since early colonial times have referred to cornmeal mush or cereal as "samp."

Like hominy, samp is prepared from groats (dehulled kernels) of maize, but the two are produced by different processes.

Unbroken and unhusked maize (corn) kernels can also be cooked (boiled) until tender. This food is called "stampmielies" in Afrikaans. Samp is often served with beans, as in "samp and beans".

== See also ==
- List of maize dishes
- Dikgobe
