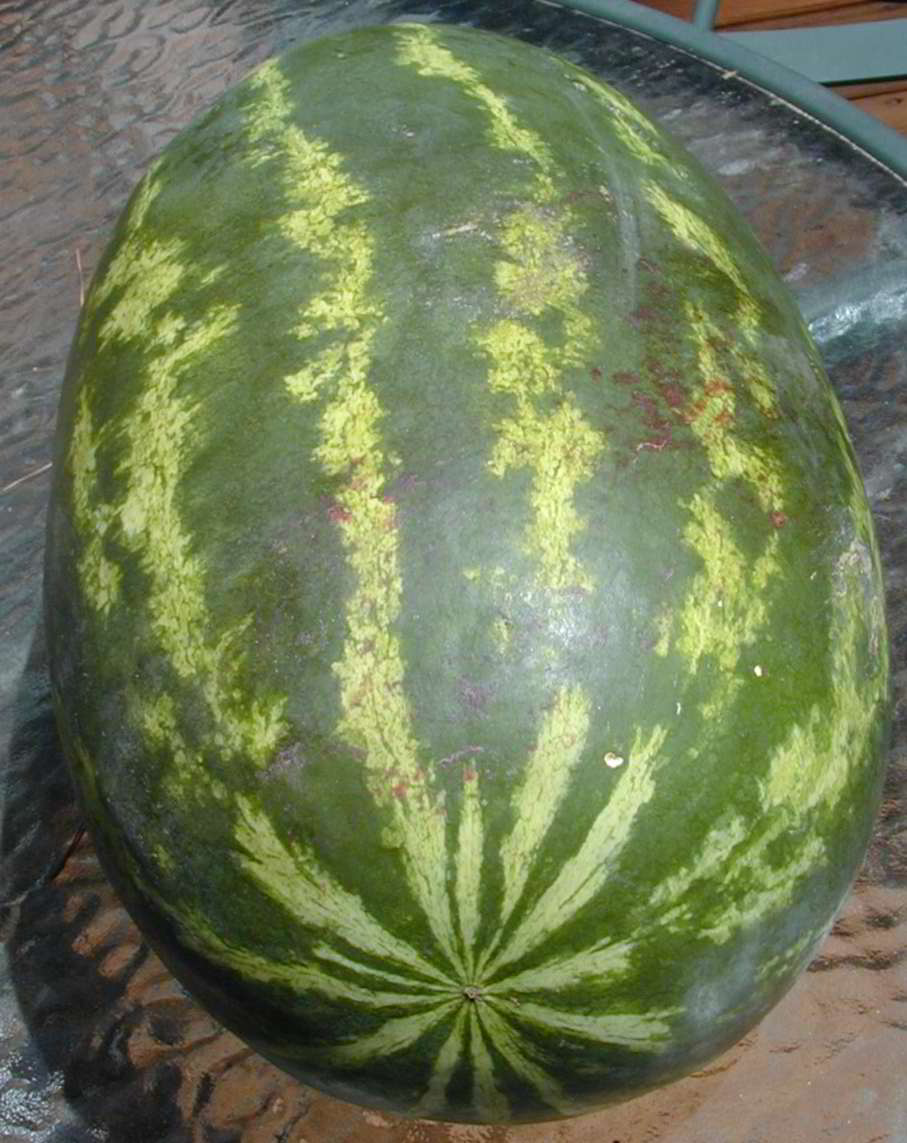
- Watermelon, Citrullus lanatus

Scientific classification
- Kingdom: Plantae
- Clade: Embryophytes
- Clade: Tracheophytes
- Clade: Spermatophytes
- Clade: Angiosperms
- Clade: Eudicots
- Clade: Rosids
- Order: Cucurbitales
- Family: Cucurbitaceae
- Subfamily: Cucurbitoideae
- Tribe: Benincaseae
- Genus: Citrullus; Schrad. ex Eckl. & Zeyh.

Species
- See text

Synonyms
- Anguria Mill.; Colocynthis Mill.; Pseudocucumis (A.Meeuse) C.Jeffrey; Rigocarpus Neck.

= Citrullus =

Genus of flowering plants

Citrullus is a genus of seven species of desert vines, among which Citrullus lanatus (the watermelon) is an important crop.

== Taxonomy ==
Molecular data, including sequences from the original collection of Momordica lanata made near Cape Town by C. P. Thunberg in 1773, show that what Thunberg collected is not what has been called Citrullus lanatus, the domesticated watermelon, since the 1930s. Although this error only occurred in 1930 (Bailey, Gentes Herbarum 2: 180–186), it has been perpetuated in hundreds of papers on the watermelon. In addition, there is an older name for the watermelon, Citrullus battich Forssk. (Fl. Aegypt.-Arab.: 167. Jun 1775), which would normally have the precedence over Momordica lanata Thunberg (Prodr. Pl. Cap.: 13. 1794). To solve this problem, it has been proposed to conserve the name Citrullus lanatus with a new type to preserve the current sense of the name

=== Species ===
Citrullus consists of the following species:

- Citrullus amarus Schrad. – citron melon
- Citrullus colocynthis (L.) Schrad. – colocynth
- Citrullus ecirrhosus Cogn. – tendril-less melon
- Citrullus lanatus (Thunb.) Matsum. & Nakai – desert watermelon
- Citrullus mucosospermus (Fursa) Fursa – egusi melon
- Citrullus naudinianus (Sond.) Hook.f.
- Citrullus rehmii De Winter
