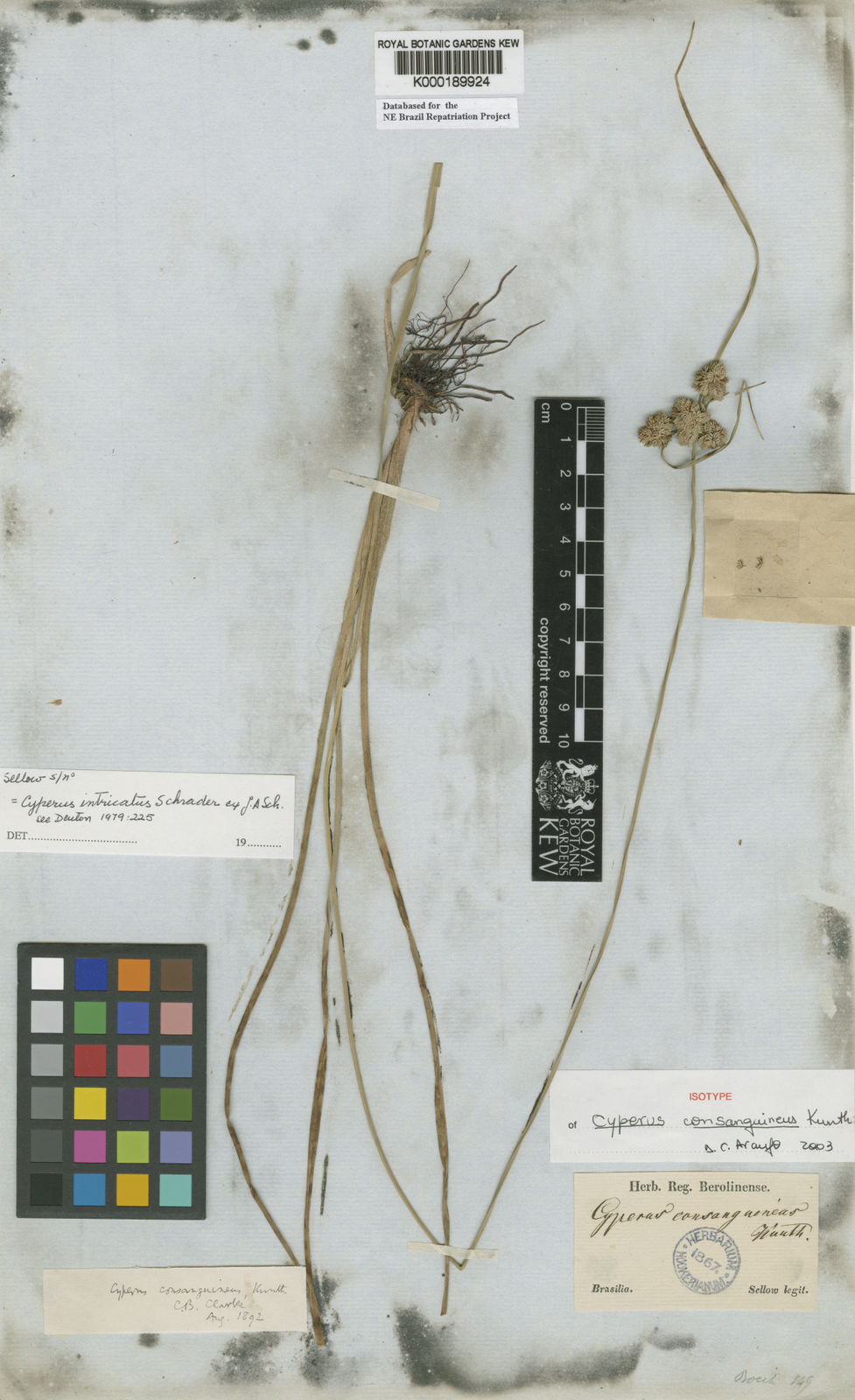

Scientific classification
- Kingdom: Plantae
- Clade: Tracheophytes
- Clade: Angiosperms
- Clade: Monocots
- Clade: Commelinids
- Order: Poales
- Family: Cyperaceae
- Genus: Cyperus
- Species: C. intricatus

Binomial name
- Cyperus intricatus Schrad., 1824

= Cyperus intricatus =

Species of sedge

Cyperus intricatus is a species of sedge that is native to southern parts of Central America and northern parts of South America.

== See also ==
- List of Cyperus species
