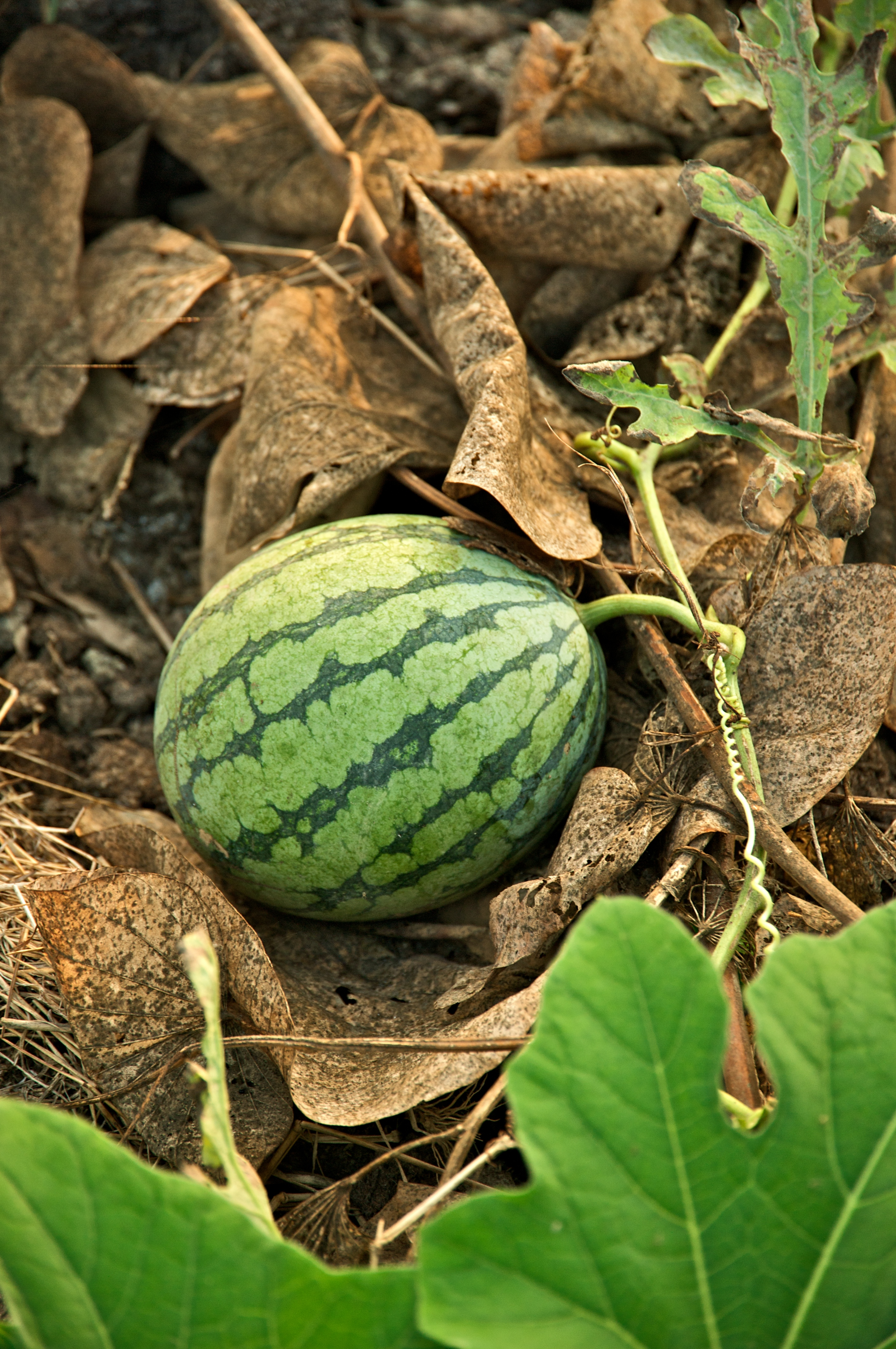
- Watermelon
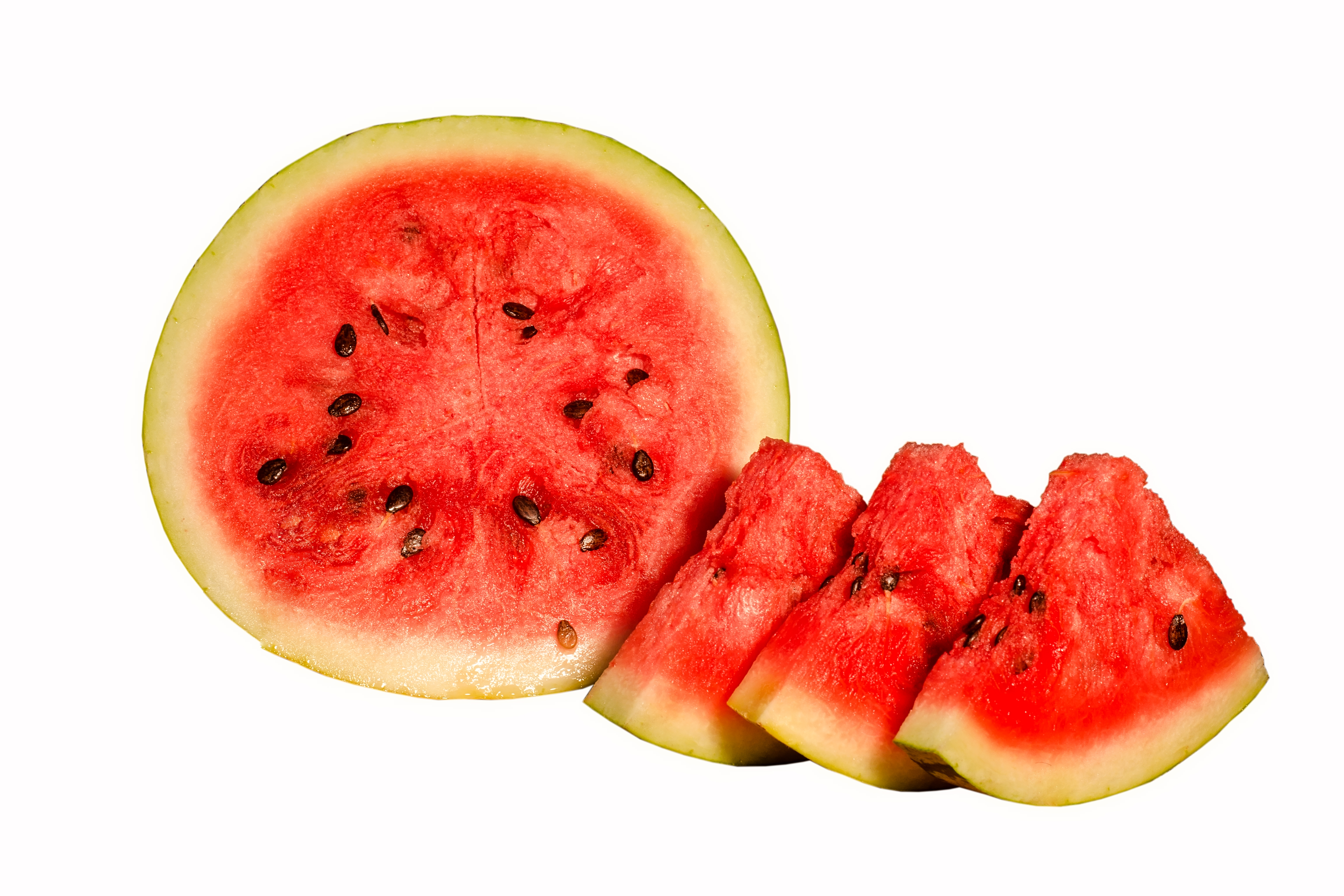
- Watermelon cross section

Scientific classification
- Kingdom: Plantae
- Clade: Tracheophytes
- Clade: Angiosperms
- Clade: Eudicots
- Clade: Rosids
- Order: Cucurbitales
- Family: Cucurbitaceae
- Genus: Citrullus
- Species: C. lanatus

Binomial name
- Citrullus lanatus (Thunb.) Matsum. & Nakai

Synonyms
- List: Anguria citrullus Mill.; Citrullus afrorum Schrad.; Citrullus anguria (Duchesne) H.Hara; Citrullus aquosus Schur; Citrullus battich Forssk.; Citrullus chodospermus Falc. & Dunal; Citrullus citrullus (L.) H.Karst.; Citrullus edulis Spach; Citrullus mucosospermus (Fursa) Fursa; Citrullus pasteca Sageret; Citrullus vulgaris Schrad.; Colocynthis amarissima Schrad. nom. inval.; Colocynthis amarissima Schltdl.; Colocynthis citrullus (L.) Kuntze; Cucumis amarissimus Schrad.; Cucumis citrullus (L.) Ser.; Cucumis dissectus Decne.; Cucumis laciniosus Eckl. ex Steud.; Cucumis vulgaris (Schrad.) E.H.L.Krause; Cucurbita anguria Duchesne; Cucurbita afra Eckl. & Zeyh.; Cucurbita citrullus L.; Cucurbita gigantea Salisb.; Cucurbita pinnatifida Schrank; Momordica lanata Thunb.

= Watermelon =

Plant with large fruit

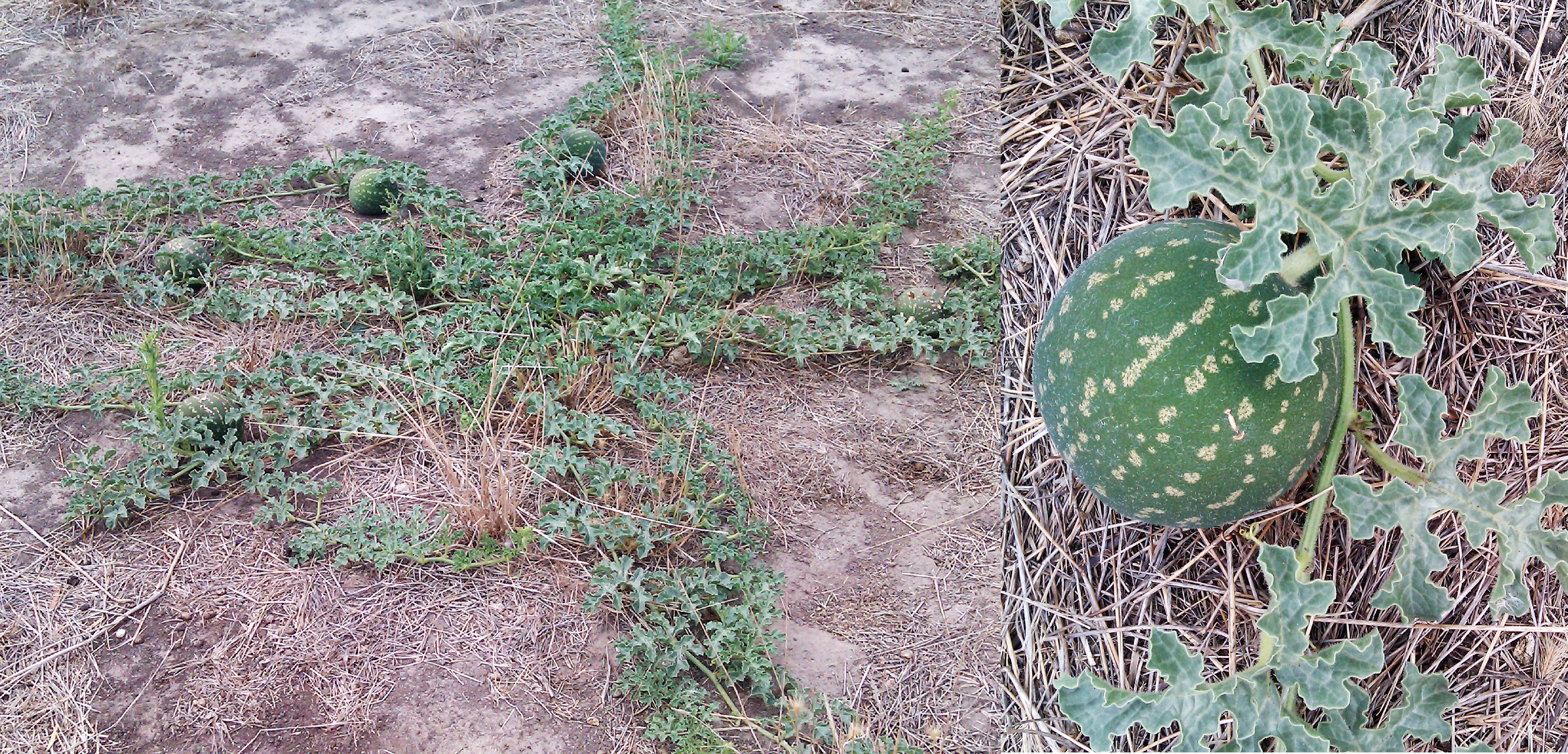
Naturalized in Australia

The watermelon (Citrullus lanatus) is a species of flowering plant in the family Cucurbitaceae. It is a scrambling and trailing vine-like plant cultivated worldwide for its fruit, a large berry with a firm rind and no internal divisions, botanically termed a pepo. The sweet, juicy flesh is usually deep red to pink, with many seeds that are black when mature and white when immature.

The modern watermelon originated in Sudan, where it was first domesticated and cultivated. Kordofan melons are the closest relatives, and may be progenitors of modern, cultivated watermelons. Watermelons were domesticated in Sudan and cultivated in Egypt by 2000 BCE. Dessert watermelons spread around the Mediterranean world during Roman antiquity. Considerable breeding effort has developed disease-resistant and seedless varieties. Many cultivars are available that produce mature fruit within 100 days of planting. In 2024, China produced 60% of the world's watermelons.

Watermelons are grown in tropical to temperate regions for its fruit, which can be eaten raw or used to make juice or wine. The rind is also edible after being pickled or cooked.

== Description ==
The watermelon is an annual plant that has a prostrate or climbing habit, spreading out up to 2 metres (7 feet). The leaves are alternate, lobed (sometimes with serrated margins), 6 to 20 centimetres (2 1/2 to 8 inches) long, and 4 to 15 cm (1 1/2 to 6 in) wide. Young growth is densely woolly with yellowish-brown hairs which disappear as the plant ages. It has branching tendrils.

The species is monoecious, with male and female flowers produced on the same plant. Blooming from July to August, the five-petaled flowers are white or yellow and borne on 40-millimetre-long (1 1/2 in) hairy stalks. Each flower grows singly in the leaf axils, with five petals fused into a cup. The male flowers predominate at the beginning of the season; the female flowers, which develop later, have inferior ovaries. The styles are united into a single column.

The large fruit is a kind of modified berry called a pepo, with a thick rind and fleshy center (mesocarp and endocarp). Wild plants have fruits up to 20 cm (8 in) in diameter, while cultivated varieties may exceed 60 cm (24 in). The rind of the fruit is mid- to dark green and usually mottled or striped, and the flesh, containing numerous seeds spread throughout the inside, can be red or pink (most commonly), orange, yellow, green or white.

A bitter watermelon, C. amarus, has become naturalized in semiarid regions of several continents, and is designated as a "pest plant" in parts of Western Australia, where they are called "pig melons".

== Taxonomy ==
The sweet watermelon was first described by Carl Linnaeus in 1753 and given the name Cucurbita citrullus. It was reassigned to the genus Citrullus in 1836, under the replacement name Citrullus vulgaris, by the German botanist Heinrich Adolf Schrader. (The International Code of Nomenclature for algae, fungi, and plants does not allow names like "Citrullus citrullus".)

The species is further divided into several varieties, of which bitter wooly melon (Citrullus lanatus [Thunb.] Matsum. & Nakai var. lanatus), citron melons (Citrullus lanatus var. citroides [L. H. Bailey] Mansf.), and the edible var. vulgaris are common. This taxonomy originated with the erroneous synonymization of the wooly melon Citrullus lanatus with the sweet watermelon Citrullus vulgaris by L. H. Bailey in 1930. Molecular data, including sequences from the original collection of Thunberg and other relevant type material, show that the sweet watermelon (Citrullus vulgaris Schrad.) and the bitter wooly melon Citrullus lanatus (Thunb.) Matsum. & Nakai are not closely related to each other. A proposal to conserve the name, Citrullus lanatus (Thunb.) Matsum. & Nakai, was accepted by the nomenclature committee and confirmed at the International Botanical Congress in 2017.

Prior to 2015, the wild species closest to Citrullus lanatus was assumed to be the tendril-less melon Citrullus ecirrhosus Cogn. from South African arid regions based on an erroneously identified 18th-century specimen. However, after phylogenetic analysis, the closest relative to Citrullus lanatus is now thought to be Citrullus mucosospermus (Fursa) from West Africa (from Senegal to Nigeria), which is also sometimes considered a subspecies within C. lanatus. Watermelon populations from Sudan are also close to domesticated watermelons. The bitter wooly melon was formally described by Carl Peter Thunberg in 1794 and given the name Momordica lanata. It was reassigned to the genus Citrullus in 1916 by Japanese botanists Jinzō Matsumura and Takenoshin Nakai.

== Domestication ==
The modern watermelon originated in Sudan, where it was first domesticated and cultivated. A melon from the Kordofan region of Sudan – the kordofan melon – may be the progenitor of the modern, domesticated watermelon. The kordofan melon shares with the domestic watermelon the loss of the bitterness gene while maintaining a sweet taste, unlike other wild African varieties from other regions, indicating a common origin, possibly cultivated in the Nile Valley by 2340 BCE.

Watermelon seeds have been found in the Dead Sea region at the ancient settlements of Bab edh-Dhra and Tel Arad. A 2022 study traced 6,000-year-old watermelon seeds found in the Libyan desert to the Egusi seeds of Nigeria. Many 5,000-year-old wild watermelon seeds (C. lanatus) were discovered at Uan Muhuggiag, a c. 3500 BCE prehistoric archaeological site located in southwestern Libya.

== Cultivation history ==
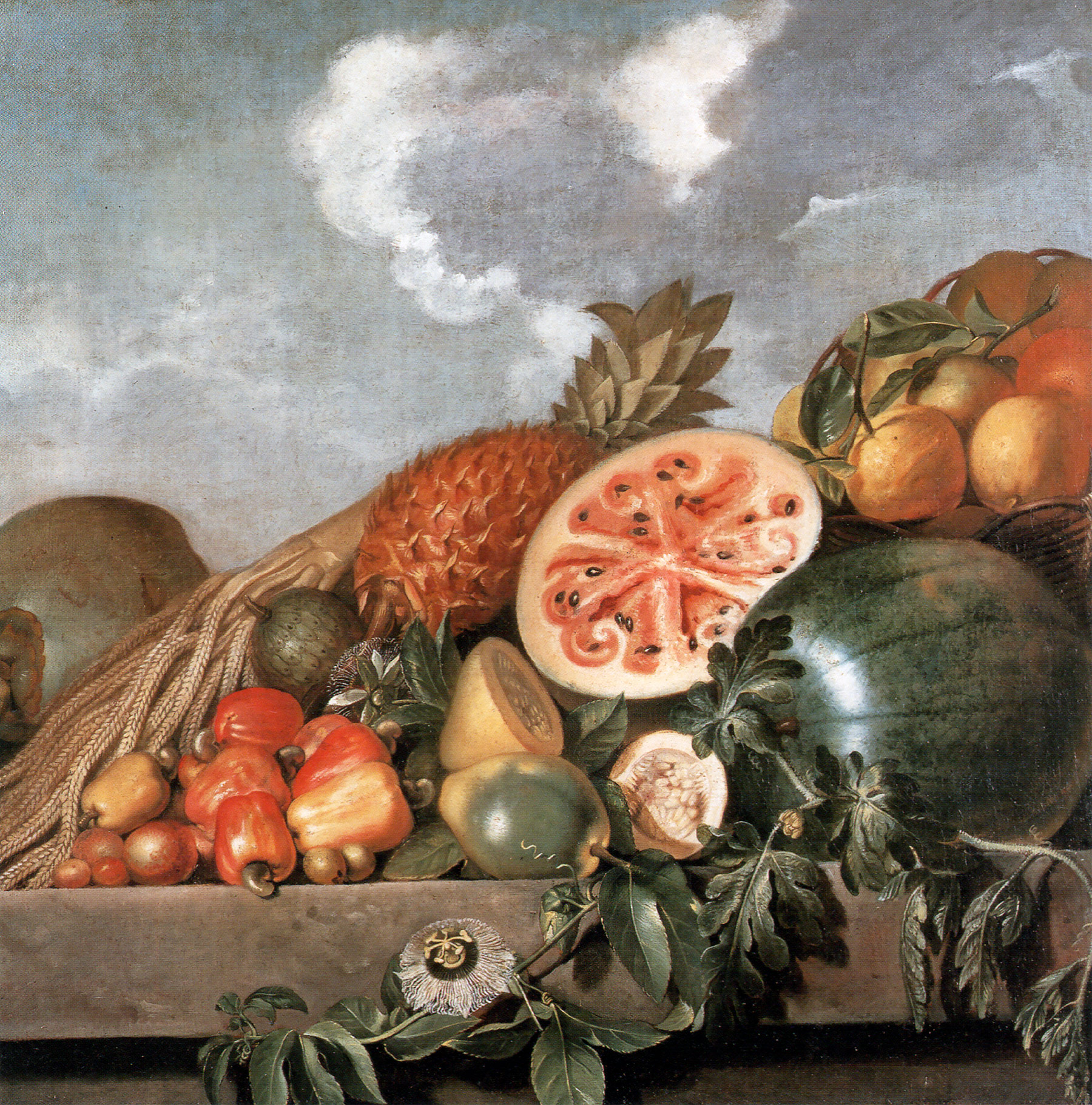
Still Life with Watermelons, Pineapple and Other Fruit by Albert Eckhout, a Dutch painter active in 17th-century Brazil

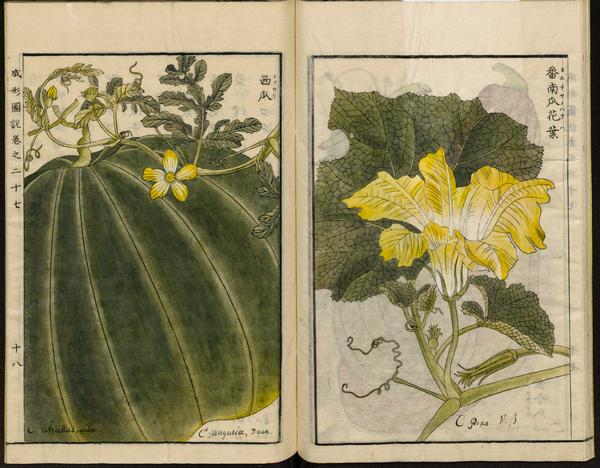
Illustration from the Japanese agricultural encyclopedia Seikei Zusetsu (1804)

Watermelons were originally cultivated for their high water content and stored to be eaten during dry seasons, as a source of both food and water. Early watermelons were not sweet, but bitter, with yellowish-white flesh. They were also difficult to open. The modern watermelon, which tastes sweeter and is easier to open, was developed over time through selective breeding. Dessert watermelons spread across the Mediterranean world during Roman antiquity and are mentioned with other sweet fruit in Hebrew texts of the 2nd and 6th century CE.

In the 7th century CE, watermelons were being cultivated in India, and by the 10th century had reached China. The Moors introduced the fruit into the Iberian Peninsula, and there is evidence of it being cultivated in Córdoba in 961 and also in Seville in 1158. It spread northwards through southern Europe, perhaps limited in its advance by summer temperatures being insufficient for good yields. The fruit had begun appearing in European herbals by 1600, and was widely planted in Europe in the 17th century as a minor garden crop.

European colonists introduced the watermelon to the New World. Spanish settlers were growing it in Florida in 1576. It was being grown in Massachusetts by 1629, and by 1650 was being cultivated in Peru, Brazil and Panama. Around the same time, Native Americans were cultivating the crop in the Mississippi valley and Florida. Watermelons were rapidly accepted in Hawaii and other Pacific islands when they were introduced there by explorers such as Captain James Cook.

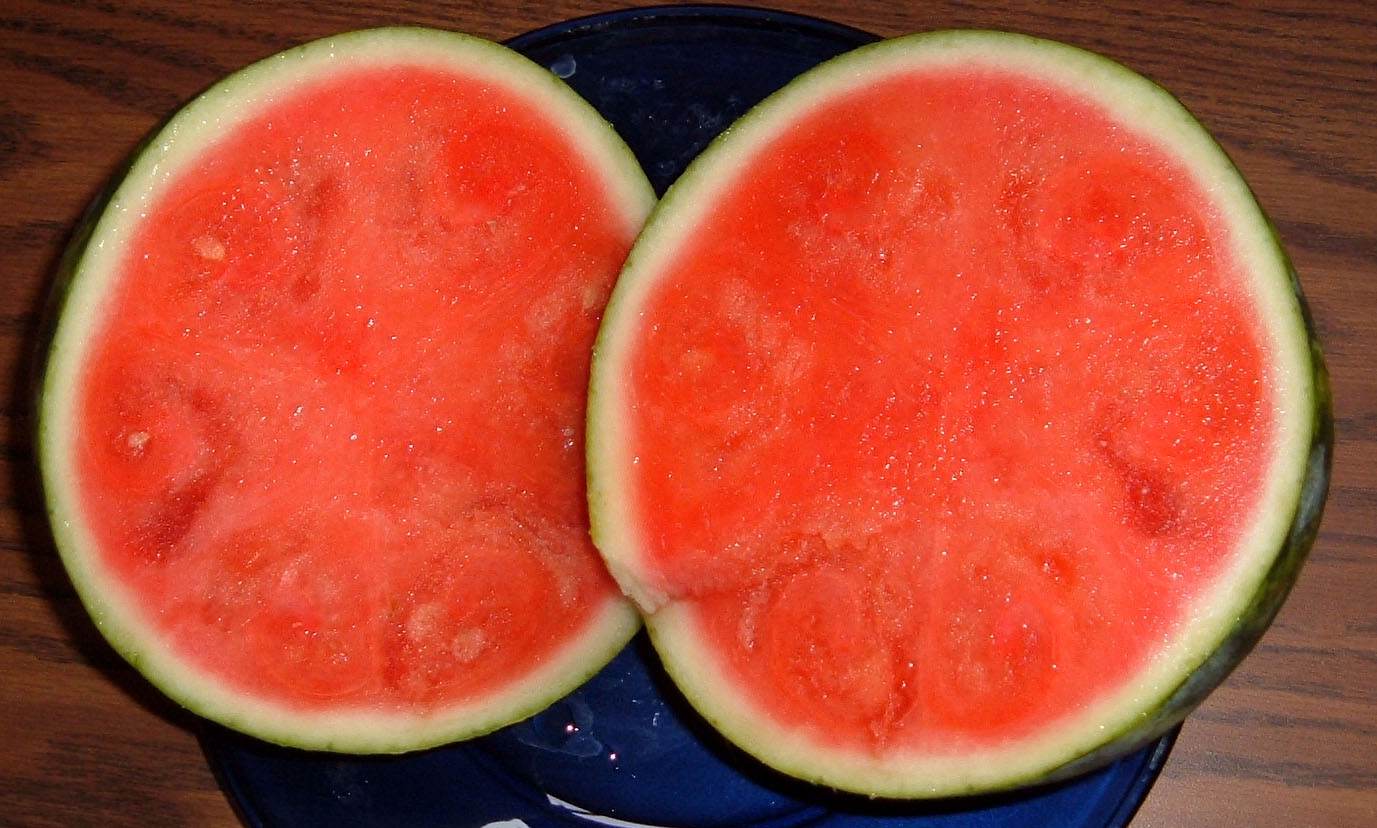
Seedless watermelon

Seedless watermelons were initially developed in 1939 by Japanese scientists who created seedless triploid hybrids but they did not have sufficient disease resistance. Seedless watermelons became more common in the 21st century, rising to nearly 85% of total watermelon sales in the United States in 2014.

== Modern cultivation ==
Watermelons grow in tropical to temperate climates, needing temperatures higher than 25 °C (77 °F) to thrive. On a garden scale, seeds are usually sown in pots under cover and transplanted into the ground. Ideal conditions are a well-drained sandy loam with a pH between 5.7 and 7.2. It is not shade tolerant.

Major pests of the watermelon include aphids, fruit flies, and root-knot nematodes. In conditions of high humidity, the plants are prone to plant diseases such as powdery mildew and mosaic virus. Some varieties often grown in Japan and other parts of the Far East are susceptible to fusarium wilt. Grafting such varieties onto disease-resistant rootstocks offers protection.

The US Department of Agriculture recommends using at least one beehive per acre (4,000 m^{2} per hive) for pollination of conventional, seeded varieties for commercial plantings. Seedless hybrids have sterile pollen. This requires planting pollinizer rows of varieties with viable pollen. Since the supply of viable pollen is reduced, and pollination is much more critical in producing the seedless variety, the recommended number of hives per acre increases to three hives per acre (1,300 m^{2} per hive). Watermelons have a longer growing period than other melons and can often take 85 days or more from the time of transplanting for the fruit to mature. About a thousand grains of pollen must be delivered and spread evenly on the three lobes of the stigma to make a normal sized and shaped fruit. In addition, lack of pollen is thought to contribute to "hollow heart" which causes the flesh of the watermelon to develop a large hole, sometimes in an intricate, symmetric shape. Watermelons suffering from hollow heart are safe to consume.

Watermelons are an important water source in South Africa, the Kalahari Desert, and East Africa for both humans and animals.

=== Production ===
Watermelon production 2024, millions of tonnes
China	63.5
India	3.7
Turkey	3.2
Algeria	2.5
Brazil	2.0
World	105
Source: FAOSTAT of the United Nations

In 2024, world production of watermelons was 105 million tonnes, led by China (mainland) accounting for 60% of the total. Secondary producers were India, Turkey, Algeria, and Brazil.

Watermelon yield

Production of watermelons

=== Varieties ===
Various cultivar groups exist:

==== Citroides group ====
(syn. C. lanatus subsp. lanatus var. citroides; C. lanatus var. citroides; C. vulgaris var. citroides)

DNA data reveal that C. lanatus var. citroides Bailey is the same as Thunberg's bitter wooly melon, C. lanatus and also the same as C. amarus Schrad. It is not a form of the sweet watermelon C. vulgaris nor closely related to that species.

The citron melon or makataan – a variety with sweet yellow flesh that is cultivated around the world for fodder and the production of citron peel and pectin.

==== Lanatus group ====
(syn. C. lanatus var. caffer)

C. caffer Schrad. is a synonym of C. amarus Schrad.

The variety known as tsamma is grown for its juicy white flesh. The variety was an important food source for travellers in the Kalahari Desert.

Another variety known as karkoer or bitterboela is unpalatable to humans, but the seeds may be eaten.

A small-fruited form with a bumpy skin has caused poisoning in sheep.

==== Vulgaris group ====
This is Linnaeus's sweet watermelon; it has been grown for human consumption for thousands of years.

- C. lanatus mucosospermus (Fursa) Fursa

This West African species is the closest wild relative of the watermelon. It is cultivated for cattle feed.

Additionally, other wild species have bitter fruit containing cucurbitacin. C. colocynthis (L.) Schrad. ex Eckl. & Zeyh., C. rehmii De Winter, and C. naudinianus (Sond.) Hook.f.

==== Varieties ====
The more than 1,200 cultivars of watermelon range in weight from less than 1 kilogram (2 1/4 pounds) to more than 90 kg (200 lb); the flesh can be red, pink, orange, yellow or white.

- The 'Carolina Cross' produced the current world record for heaviest watermelon, weighing 159 kg (351 lb). It has green skin, red flesh and commonly produces fruit between 29 and 68 kg (65 and 150 lb). It takes about 90 days from planting to harvest.
- The 'Golden Midget' has a golden rind and pink flesh when ripe, and takes 70 days from planting to harvest.
- The 'Orangeglo' has a very sweet orange flesh, and is a large, oblong fruit weighing 9–14 kg (20–31 lb). It has a light green rind with jagged dark green stripes. It takes about 90–100 days from planting to harvest.
- The 'Moon and Stars' variety was created in 1926. The rind is purple/black and has many small yellow circles (stars) and one or two large yellow circles (moon). The melon weighs 9–23 kg (20–51 lb). The flesh is pink or red and has brown seeds. The foliage is also spotted. The time from planting to harvest is about 90 days.
- The 'Cream of Saskatchewan' has small, round fruits about 25 cm (10 in) in diameter. It has a thin, light and dark green striped rind, and sweet white flesh with black seeds. It can grow well in cool climates. It was originally brought to Saskatchewan, Canada, by Russian immigrants. The melon takes 80–85 days from planting to harvest.
- The 'Melitopolski' has small, round fruits roughly 28–30 cm (11–12 in) in diameter. It is an early ripening variety that originated from the Astrakhan region of Russia, an area known for cultivation of watermelons. The Melitopolski watermelons are seen piled high by vendors in Moscow in the summer. This variety takes around 95 days from planting to harvest.
- The 'Densuke' watermelon has round fruit up to 11 kg (24 lb). The rind is black with no stripes or spots. It is grown only on the island of Hokkaido, Japan, where up to 10,000 watermelons are produced every year. In June 2008, one of the first harvested watermelons was sold at an auction for 650,000 yen (US$6,300), making it the most expensive watermelon ever sold. The average selling price is generally around 25,000 yen ($250).
- Many cultivars are no longer grown commercially because of their thick rind, but seeds may be available among home gardeners and specialty seed companies. This thick rind is desirable for making watermelon pickles, and some old cultivars favoured for this purpose include 'Tom Watson', 'Georgia Rattlesnake', and 'Black Diamond'.

==== Improvement ====
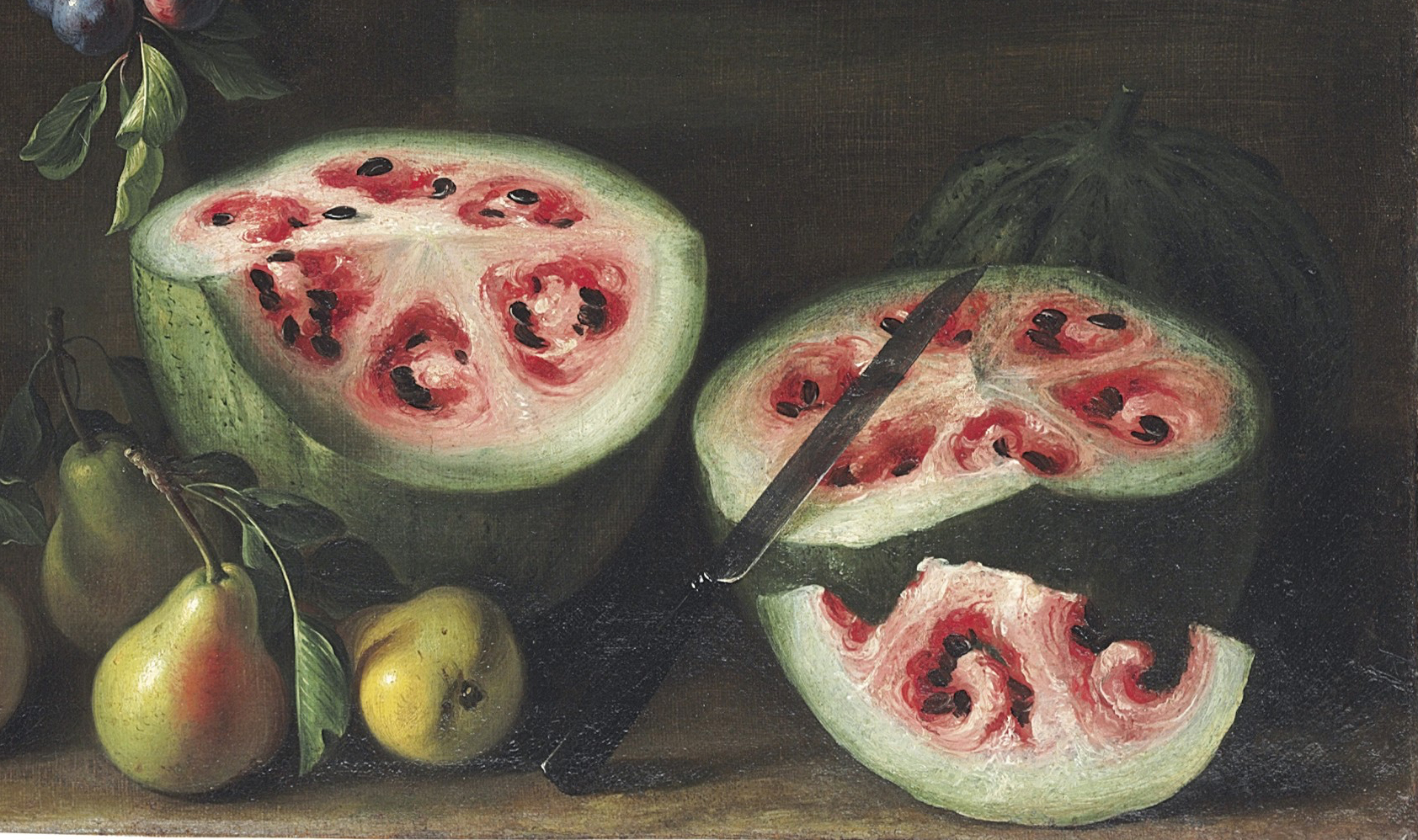
Watermelon (an old cultivar) as depicted in a 17th-century painting, oil on canvas, by Giovanni Stanchi

Charles Fredrick Andrus, a horticulturist at the USDA Vegetable Breeding Laboratory in Charleston, South Carolina, set out to produce a disease-resistant and wilt-resistant watermelon. The result, in 1954, was "that gray melon from Charleston". Its oblong shape and hard rind made it easy to stack and ship. Its adaptability meant it could be grown over a wide geographical area. It produced high yields and was resistant to the most serious watermelon diseases: anthracnose and fusarium wilt.

Others were also working on disease-resistant cultivars; J. M. Crall at the University of Florida produced 'Jubilee' in 1963 and C. V. Hall of Kansas State University produced 'Crimson Sweet' the following year. These are no longer grown to any great extent, but their lineage has been further developed into hybrid varieties with higher yields, better flesh quality and attractive appearance. Another objective of plant breeders has been the elimination of the seeds which occur scattered throughout the flesh. This has been achieved through the use of triploid varieties, but these are sterile, and the cost of producing the seed by crossing a tetraploid parent with a normal diploid parent is high.

As of 2017, farmers in approximately 44 states in the US grew watermelon commercially, producing more than $500 million worth of the fruit annually. Georgia, Florida, Texas, California and Arizona are the US's largest watermelon producers, with Florida producing more watermelon than any other state. This now-common fruit is often large enough that groceries often sell half or quarter melons. Some smaller, spherical varieties of watermelon—both red- and yellow-fleshed—are sometimes called "icebox melons". The largest recorded fruit was grown in Tennessee in 2013 and weighed 159 kilograms (351 pounds).

== Uses ==
Watermelon flesh, raw
Nutritional value per 100 g (3.5 oz)
- Energy: 127 kJ (30 kcal)
- Carbohydrates: 7.55 g
- Sugars: 6.2 g
- Dietary fiber: 0.4 g
- Fat: 0.15 g
- Protein: 0.61 g
Vitamins and minerals
Vitamins	Quantity %DV^{†}
Vitamin A equiv. beta-Carotene	3% 28 μg 3% 303 μg
Thiamine (B1)	3% 0.033 mg
Riboflavin (B2)	2% 0.021 mg
Niacin (B3)	1% 0.178 mg
Pantothenic acid (B5)	4% 0.221 mg
Vitamin B6	3% 0.045 mg
Choline	1% 4.1 mg
Vitamin C	9% 8.1 mg
Minerals	Quantity %DV^{†}
Calcium	1% 7 mg
Iron	1% 0.24 mg
Magnesium	2% 10 mg
Manganese	2% 0.038 mg
Phosphorus	1% 11 mg
Potassium	4% 112 mg
Sodium	0% 1 mg
Zinc	1% 0.1 mg
- Other constituents: Quantity
- Water: 91.45 g
- Lycopene: 4532 μg
- Link to USDA Database entry
- ^{†}Percentages estimated using US recommendations for adults, except for potassium, which is estimated based on expert recommendation from the National Academies.

=== Nutrition ===
Watermelon fruit is 91% water, 6% sugars, and has low content of fat and protein. In a reference amount of 100 grams (3 1/2 ounces), watermelon fruit supplies 127 kilojoules (30 kilocalories) of food energy, with no micronutrients in significant content (table). Watermelon pulp contains carotenoids, including lycopene.

The amino acid citrulline is produced in watermelon rind.

=== Culinary ===
Watermelon is a sweet summer fruit served freshly sliced, diced in mixed fruit salads, or as juice. Watermelon juice can be blended with other fruit juices or made into wine.

The seeds have a nutty flavor and can be dried and roasted, or ground into flour. Watermelon rinds are eaten pickled, stir-fried, or stewed.

Citrullis lanatus, variety caffer, grows wild in the Kalahari Desert. The fruits are used by the San people and wild animals for both water and nourishment, allowing survival on a diet of tsamma for six weeks.

== Cultural significance ==
The watermelon and its emoji 🍉 are used as a symbol of Palestinian resistance, of the Kherson region in Ukraine, and of eco-socialism, as in 'green on the outside, red on the inside'. Since the outbreak of the Gaza war in 2023, watermelon emojis have been more widely used on various social media platforms to show support for Palestine, to circumvent censorship and shadow banning on some platforms (a practice called "algospeak"), avoiding more overt symbols such as Palestinian flags. Because it is mostly water, the watermelon has been used to symbolize abrosexuality, a "fluid" or changing sexual orientation. In the US, the watermelon has also been used as a racist stereotype associated with African Americans.

In Chinese culture, watermelons symbolise good fortune and happiness. They are gifted during the Lunar New Year and other festive occasions. They are also commonly eaten during summer as slices.

== Gallery ==
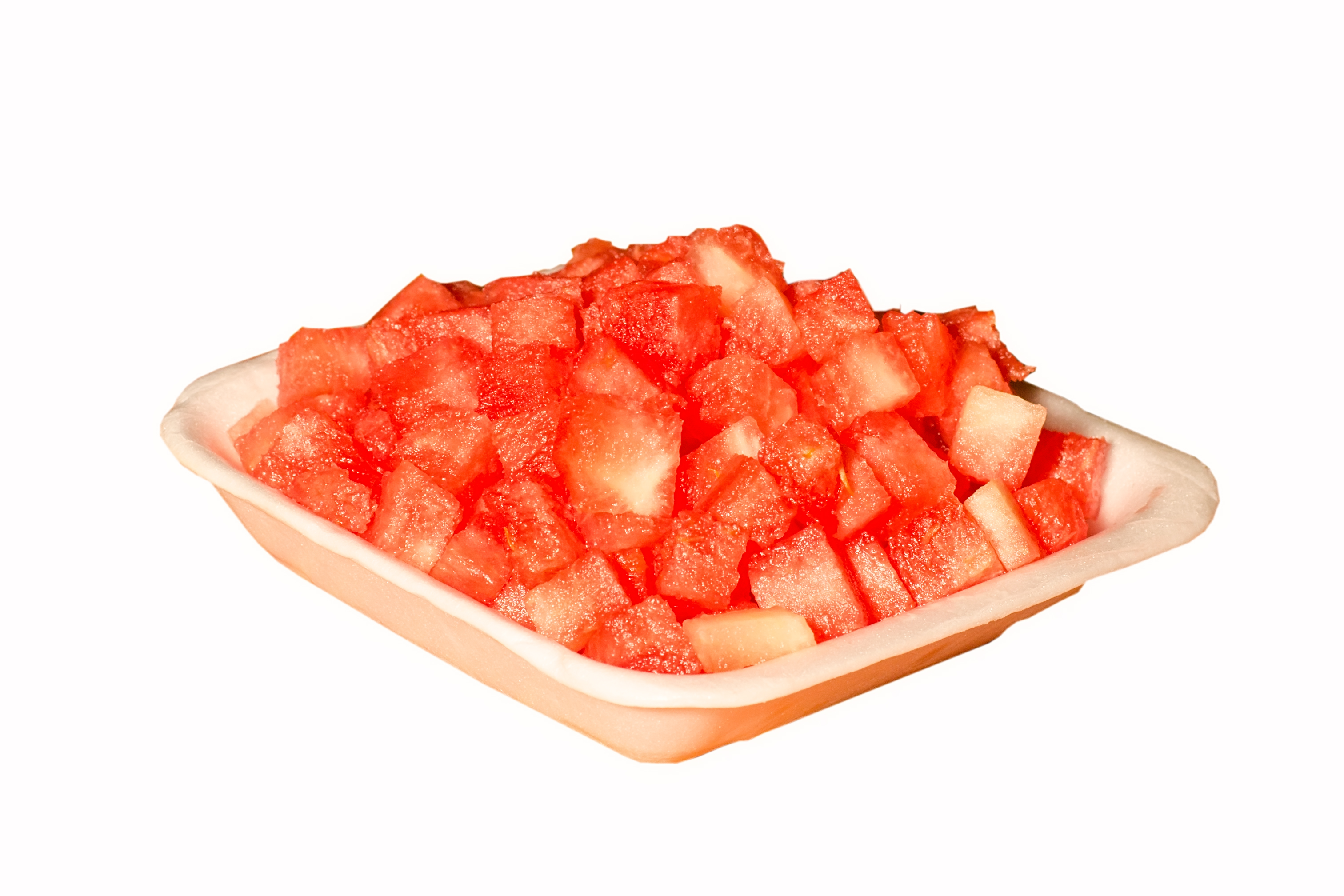
Watermelon cubes

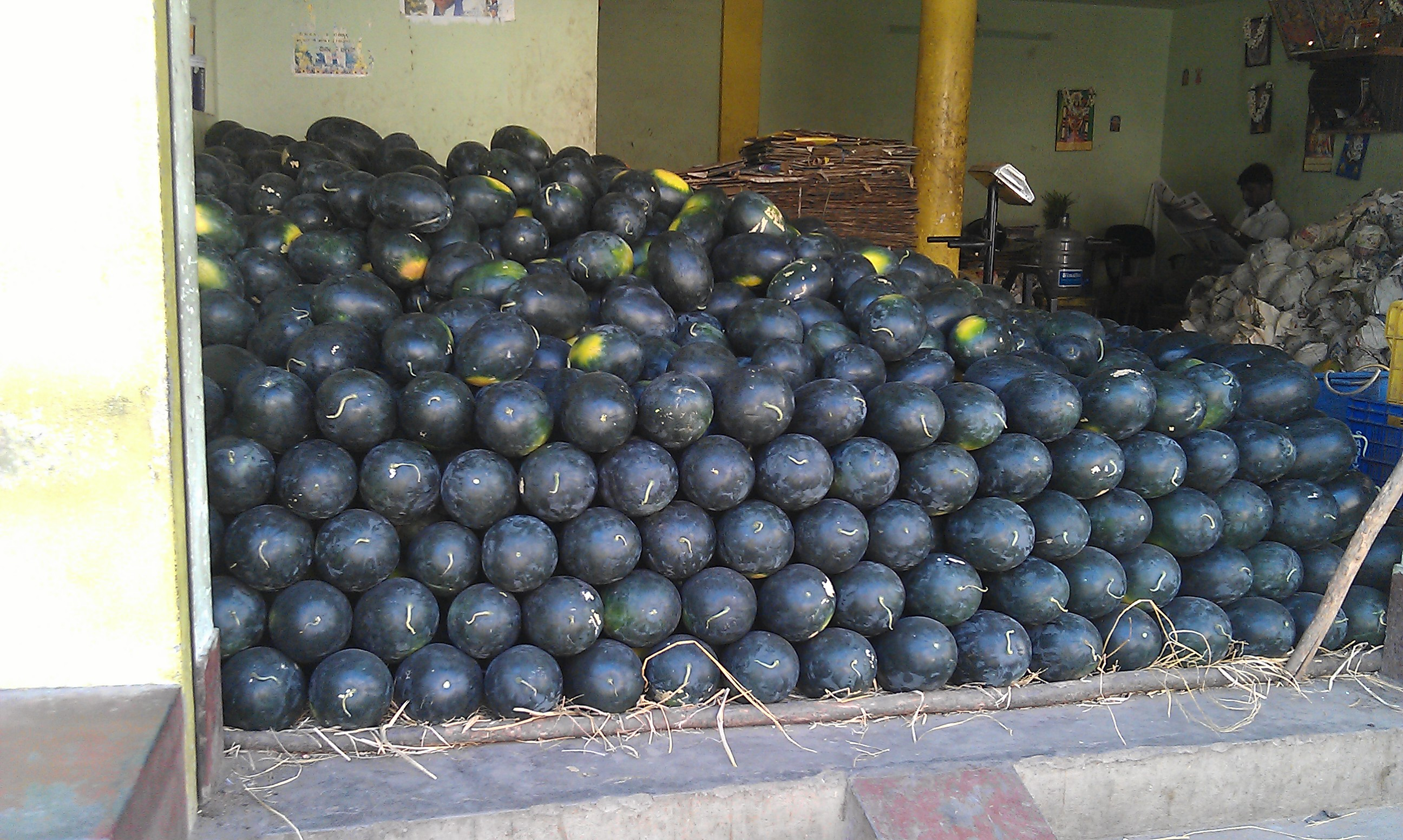
Watermelons with dark green rind, India

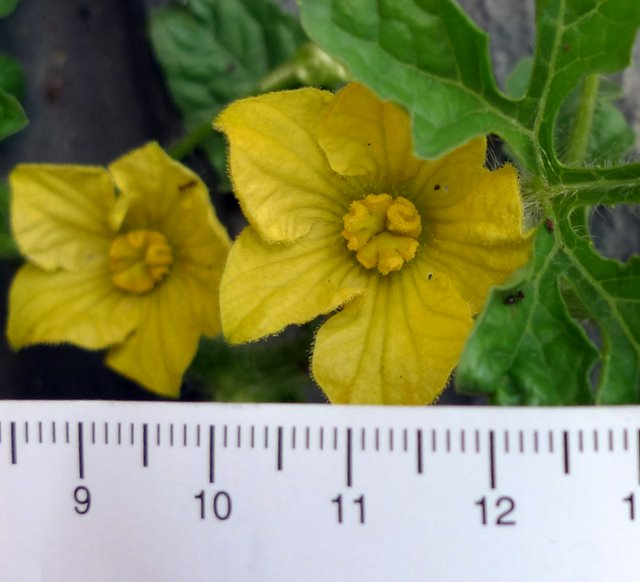
Watermelon flowers

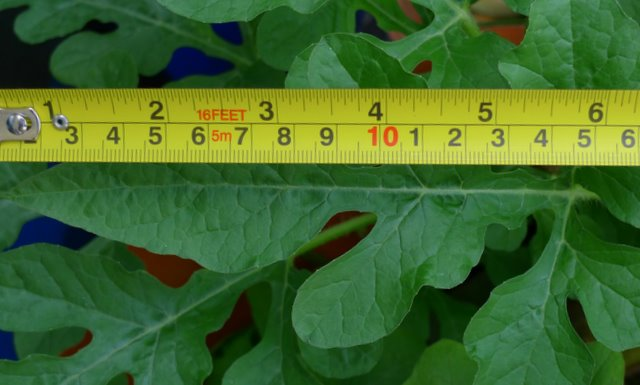
Watermelon leaf

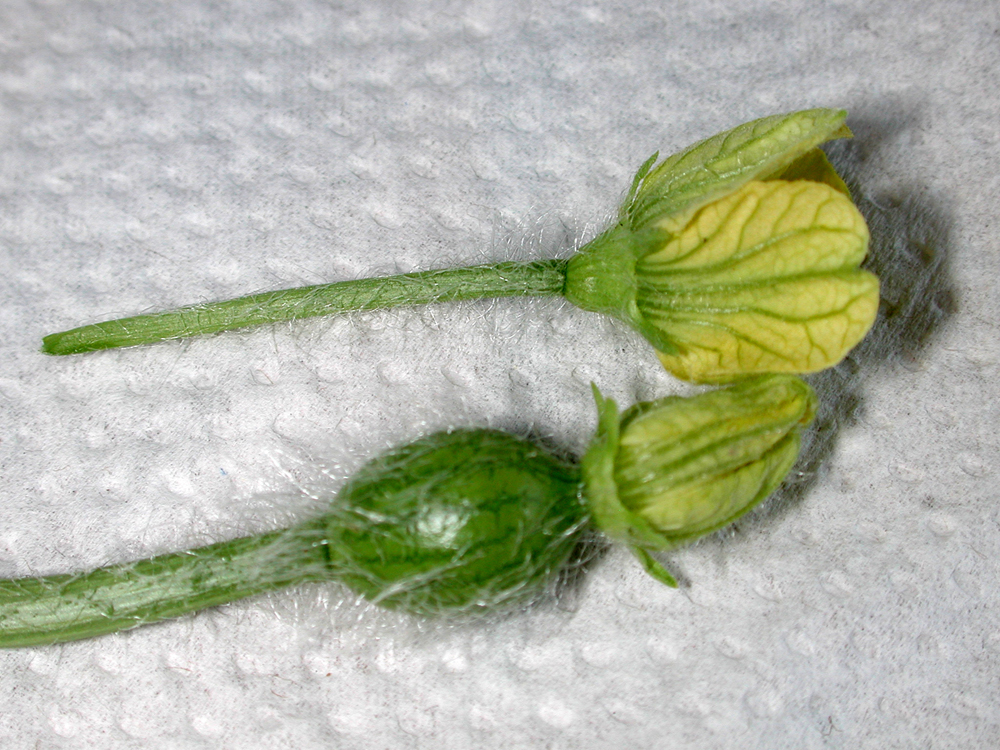
Flower stems of male and female watermelon blossoms, showing ovary on the female

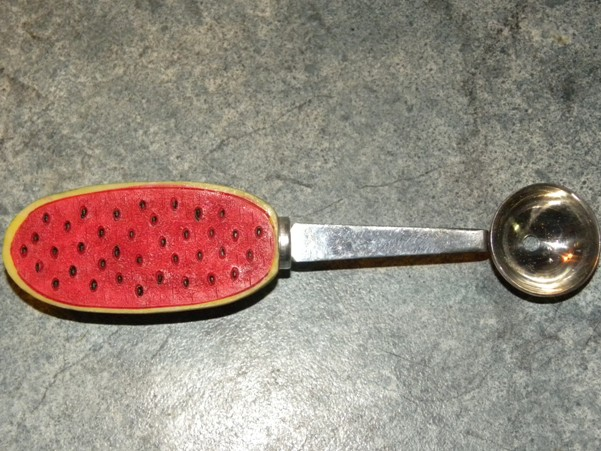
Watermelon baller

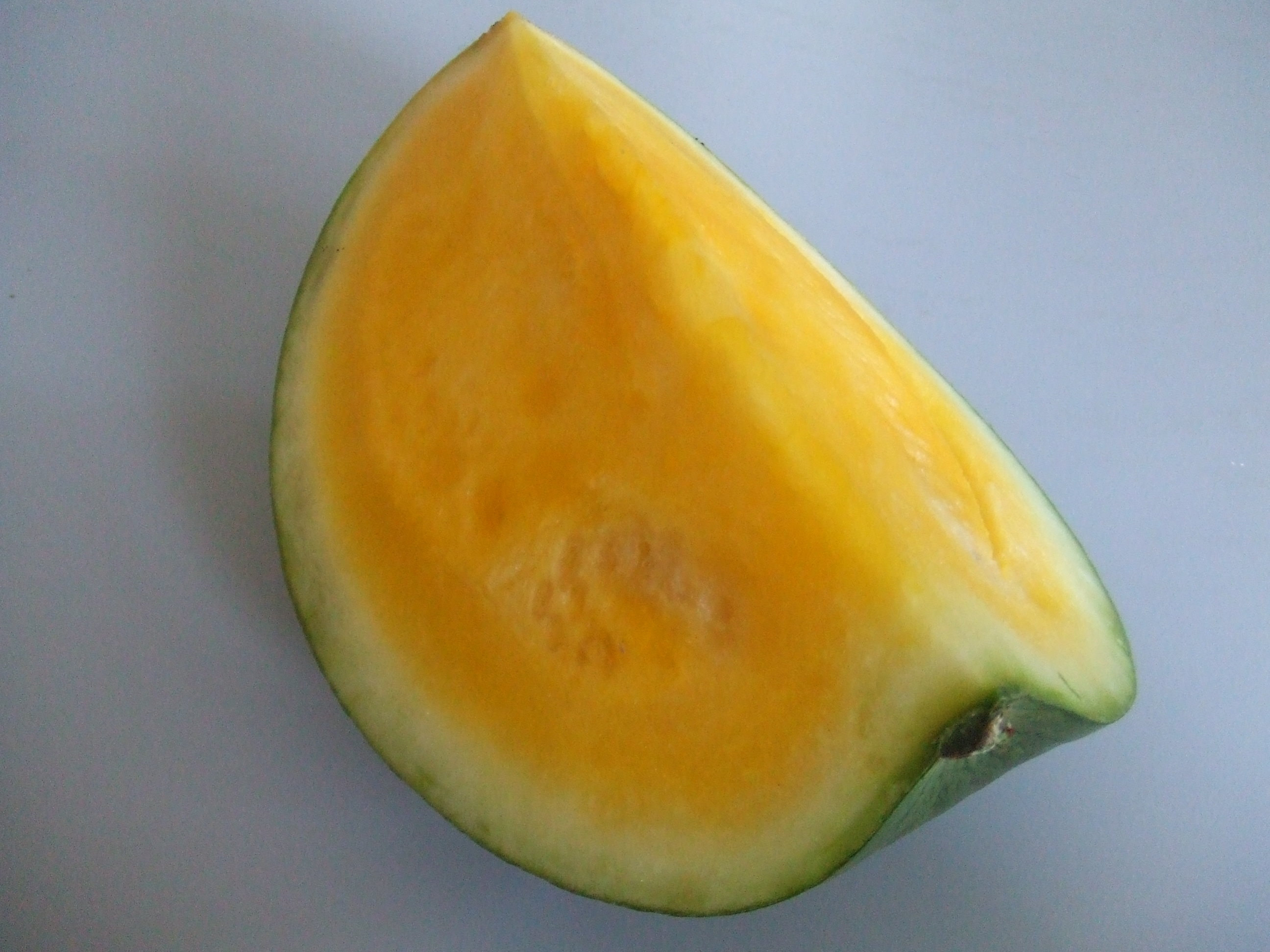
Watermelon with yellow flesh

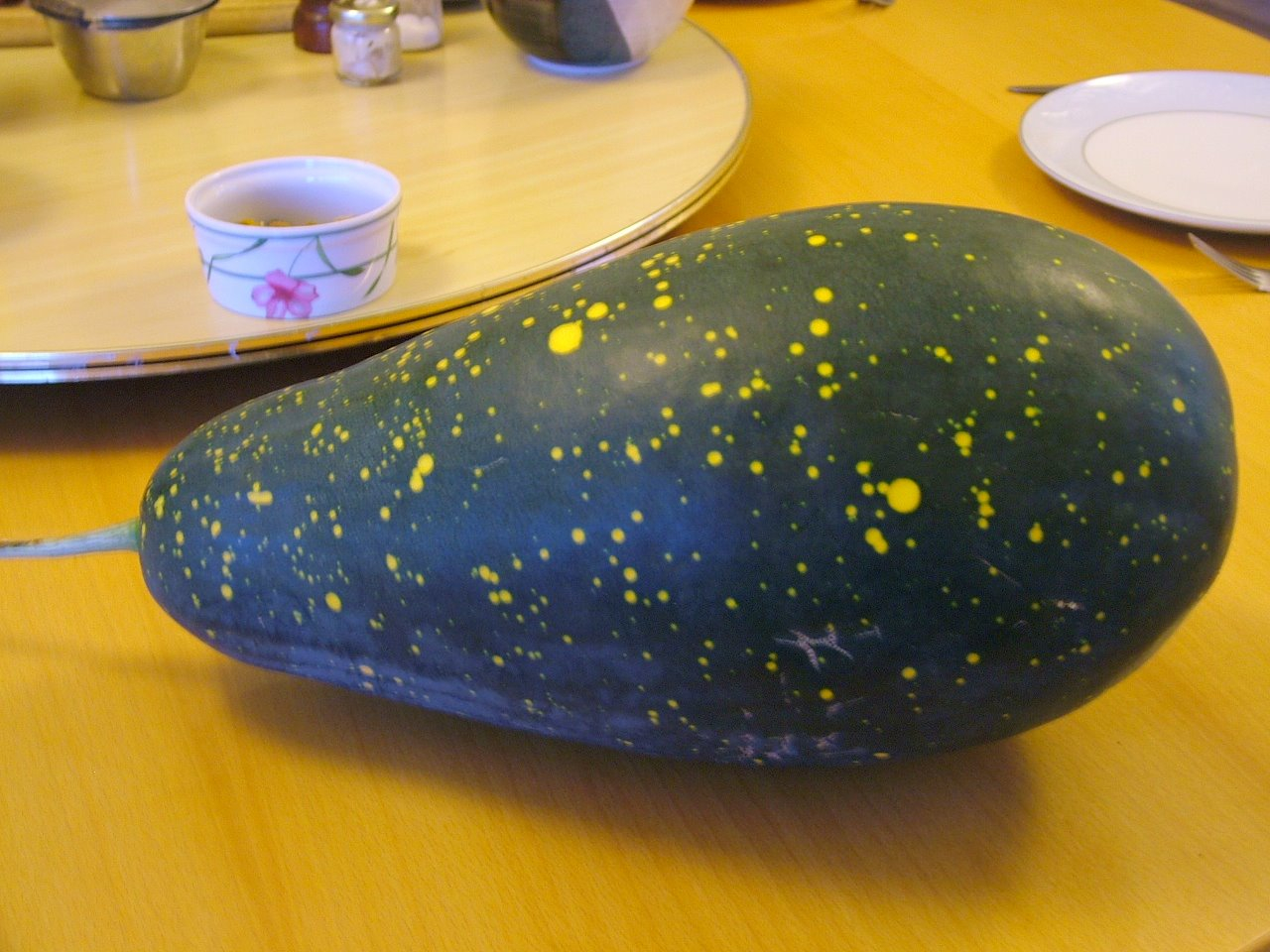
'Moon and stars' watermelon cultivar

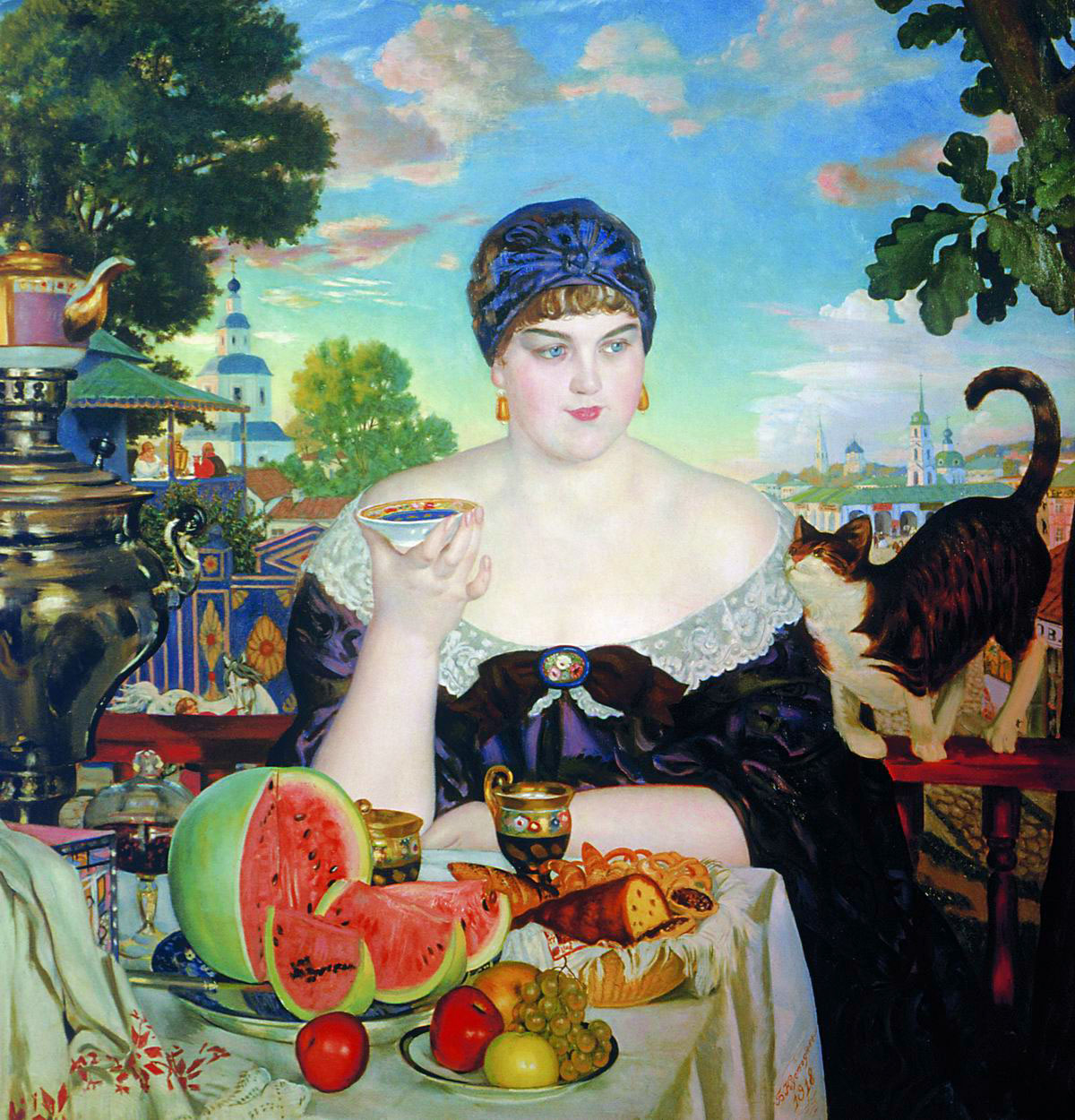
Watermelon and other fruit in Boris Kustodiev's Merchant's Wife

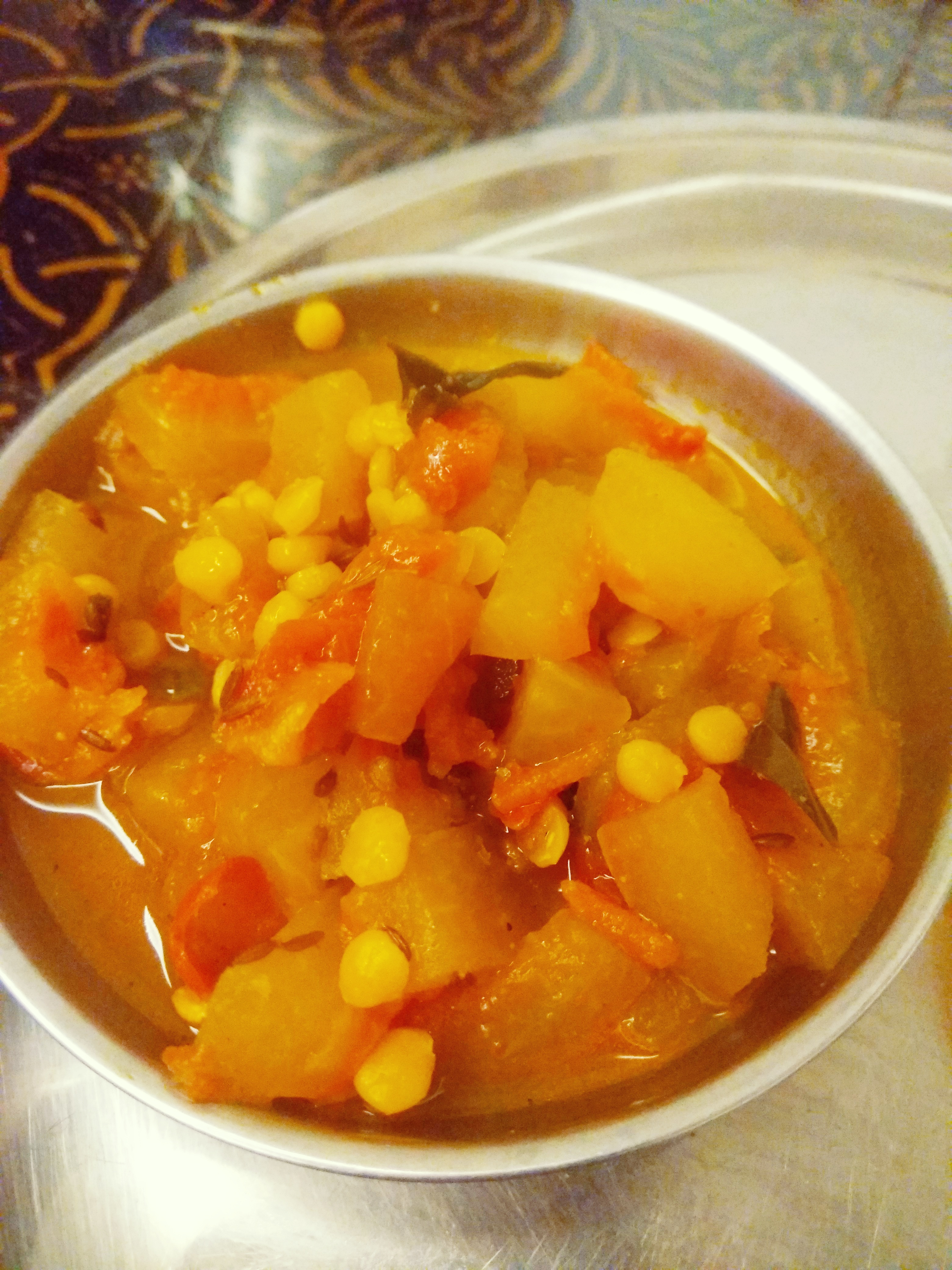
Watermelon rind curry

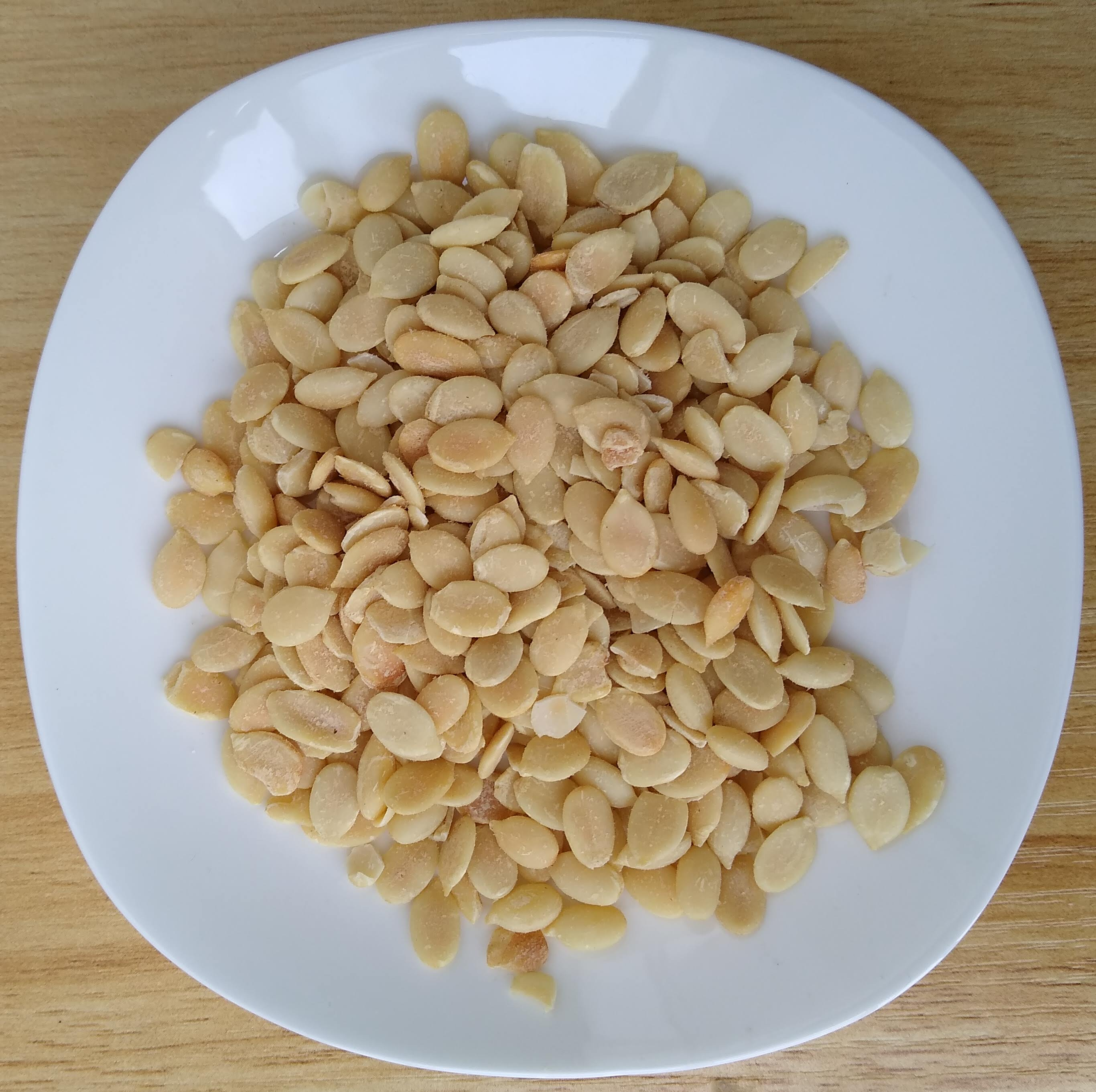
Roasted and salted watermelon seeds

Watermelon seed under a microscope

== See also ==
- List of fruits
