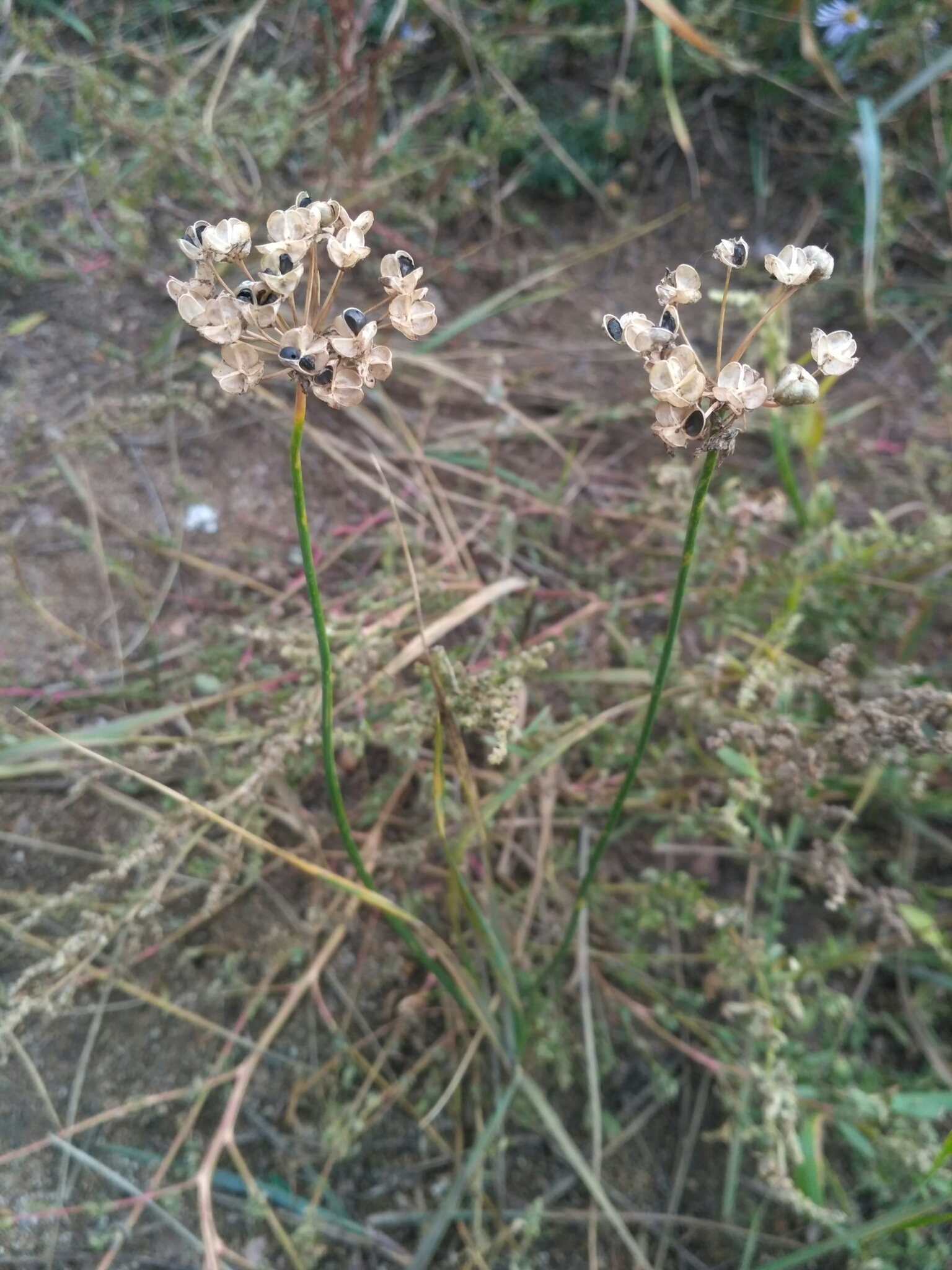

Scientific classification
- Kingdom: Plantae
- Clade: Tracheophytes
- Clade: Angiosperms
- Clade: Monocots
- Order: Asparagales
- Family: Amaryllidaceae
- Subfamily: Allioideae
- Genus: Allium
- Subgenus: A. subg. Rhizirideum
- Species: A. rubens

Binomial name
- Allium rubens Schrad. ex Willd. 1809 not Baker 1874

= Allium rubens =

Reddish onion

Species of flowering plant

Allium rubens, the reddish onion, is a species of onions native to Siberia, European Russia, Mongolia, Kazakhstan and Xinjiang. It grows in sunlit locations on steppes and scrublands.

Allium rubens produces clusters of small, narrow bulbs up to 10 mm in diameter. Scape is up to 25 cm tall. Leaves are tubular, about the same length as the scape, 10–20 mm in diameter. Umbels have only a few reddish-purple flowers.
