= Citrullus rehmii =

Scientific classification
- Kingdom: Plantae
- Clade: Tracheophytes
- Clade: Angiosperms
- Clade: Eudicots
- Clade: Rosids
- Order: Cucurbitales
- Family: Cucurbitaceae
- Genus: Citrullus
- Species: C. rehmii

Binomial name
- Citrullus rehmii De Winter

Species of melon

Citrullus rehmii, commonly known as the Namib melon, is a species of annual melon in the family Cucurbitaceae that is native to the Namib Desert, Namibia. It was described by Bernard de Winter in 1990. The species has a dark grey rind, with light brown-orange spots scattered throughout. It forms a vine with dark green leaves, and a light green stem. Flowers are a yellow color on the inside, and a white on the inside. They are non-edible, and are vastly different from other species of melon based on its general appearance. The species is quite hard to find in its natural range, but has been spotted on more than one occasion. It is somewhat used as an ornamental plant, and overlaps with the Namib tsamma (Citrullus ecirrhosus) in Namibia.
