= Schraderanthus =

Scientific classification
- Kingdom: Plantae
- Clade: Tracheophytes
- Clade: Angiosperms
- Clade: Eudicots
- Clade: Asterids
- Order: Solanales
- Family: Solanaceae
- Genus: Schraderanthus; Averett (2009)
- Species: S. viscosus

Binomial name
- Schraderanthus viscosus (Schrad.) Averett (2009)

Synonyms
- Athenaea macrocardia Standl. & Steyerm. (1940); Athenaea viscosa (Schrad.) Benth. & Hook.f. ex Fernald (1900); Chamaesaracha viscosa (Schrad.) Hunz. (1995); Jaltomata viscosa (Schrad.) D'Arcy & T.Davis (1976 publ. 1977); Leucophysalis viscosa (Schrad.) Hunz. (1991); Physalis schraderiana Bernh. (1839); Saracha viscosa Schrad. (1832) (basionym); Witheringia viscosa (Schrad.) Miers (1853)

Genus of plants

Schraderanthus viscosus is a genus of flowering plants belonging to the family Solanaceae. It is the sole species in genus Schraderanthus. It is native to southern Mexico (south of Hidalgo) and Guatemala.
