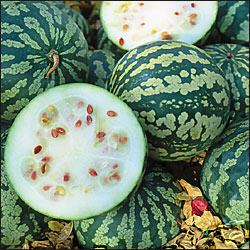

Scientific classification
- Kingdom: Plantae
- Clade: Tracheophytes
- Clade: Angiosperms
- Clade: Eudicots
- Clade: Rosids
- Order: Cucurbitales
- Family: Cucurbitaceae
- Genus: Citrullus
- Species: C. amarus

Binomial name
- Citrullus amarus Schrad.

Synonyms
- Citrullus colocynthis var. capensis Alef.; Citrullus lanatus f. amarus (Schrad.) W.J.de Wilde & Duyfjes; Citrullus lanatus var. capensis (Alef.) Fursa; Citrullus afer Schrad.; Citrullus lanatus var. afer (Schrad.) Mansf.; Citrullus lanatus var. citroides (L.H.Bailey) Mansf.; Citrullus vulgaris var. citroides L.H.Bailey

= Citron melon =

Species of plant

The citron melon (Citrullus amarus), also called fodder melon, preserving melon, red-seeded citron, jam melon, stock melon, Kalahari melon or tsamma melon, is a relative of the watermelon. It is from the family Cucurbitaceae which consists of various squashes, melons, and gourds. Native to arid landscapes of sub-Saharan Africa, it has been a wild source of nutrition and hydration for humans for an extraordinarily long time. Its fruit has a hard white flesh, rendering it less likely to be eaten raw in the modern era; more often it is pickled or used to make fruit preserves, and is used for cattle feed. It is especially useful for fruit preserves, because it has a high pectin content.

== History and distribution ==
The citron melon is native to Africa, probably the Kalahari Desert, where it still grows abundantly. The time and place of its first domestication is unknown, but it appears to have been grown in ancient Egypt at least four thousand years ago.

It is grown as food in Africa, especially in dry or desert regions, including South Africa. In some areas, it is even used as a source of water during dry seasons.

In South Africa, it is commonly eaten by the Xhosa people as Intyabontyi, a citron melon either eaten raw or cooked.

Today, it is not only found in Africa, but also domesticated elsewhere. It is known in the southern plains states of the United States as pie melon, as well as citron melon.

It has become an invasive species, growing wild, in western Mexico.

== Characteristics ==
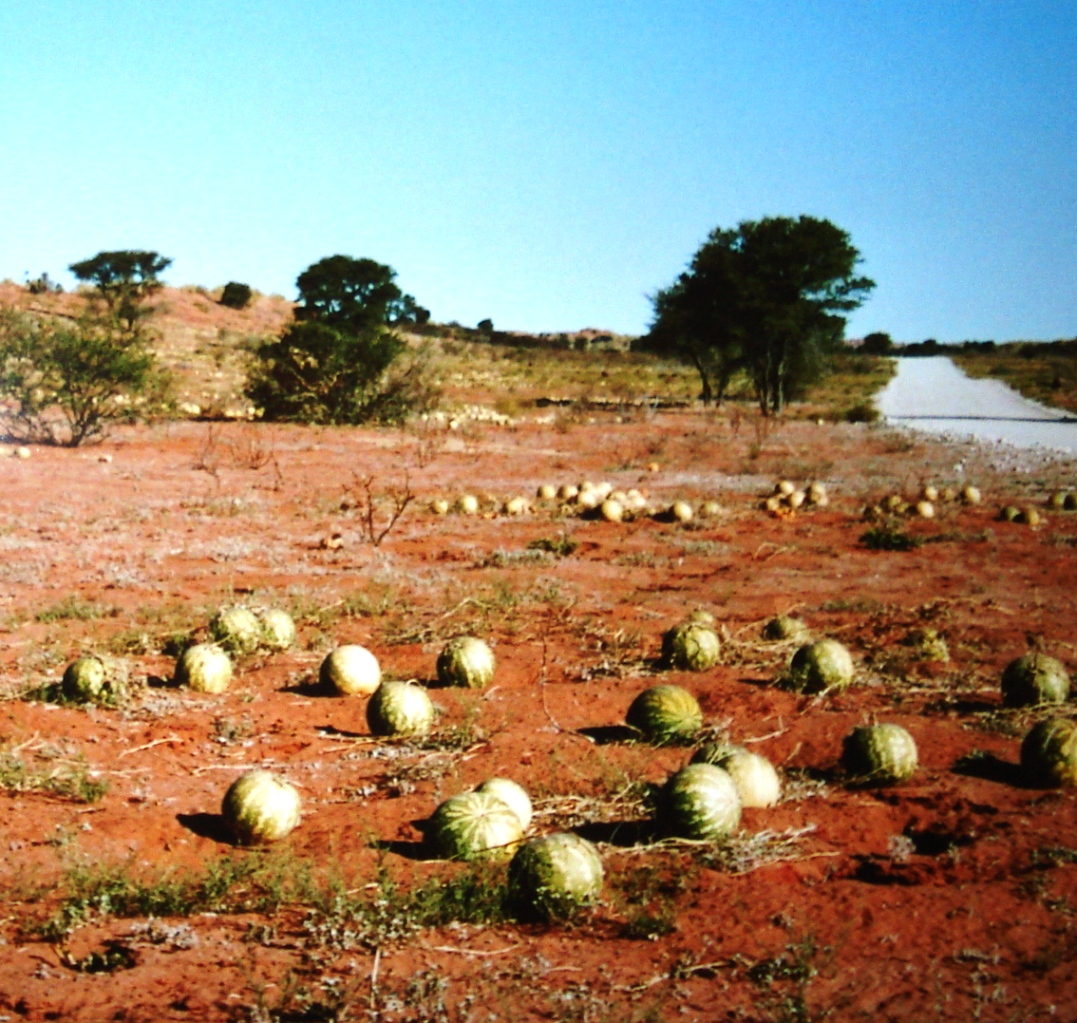
Tsamma melons in the Kalahari Desert

The actual fruit of this plant resembles the more modern, domesticated watermelons, except that it is smaller and more spheroid. The meat of the melon is more whitish and dense, tough, and much stronger in flavor, akin more to the area on a domesticated watermelon where the red meat is just turning into the white rind. As noted above, while some people do eat it raw, it is more often cooked or prepared in some other way.

Citron melon leaves are palmate in the early stages of growth, and deeply lobed in later development. They have a rough texture and a visible white venation.

Solitary flowers with large, yellow petals of around 2–10 millimeters are randomly dispersed forming many seeded fruit with a variegated light green and dark green pattern.
