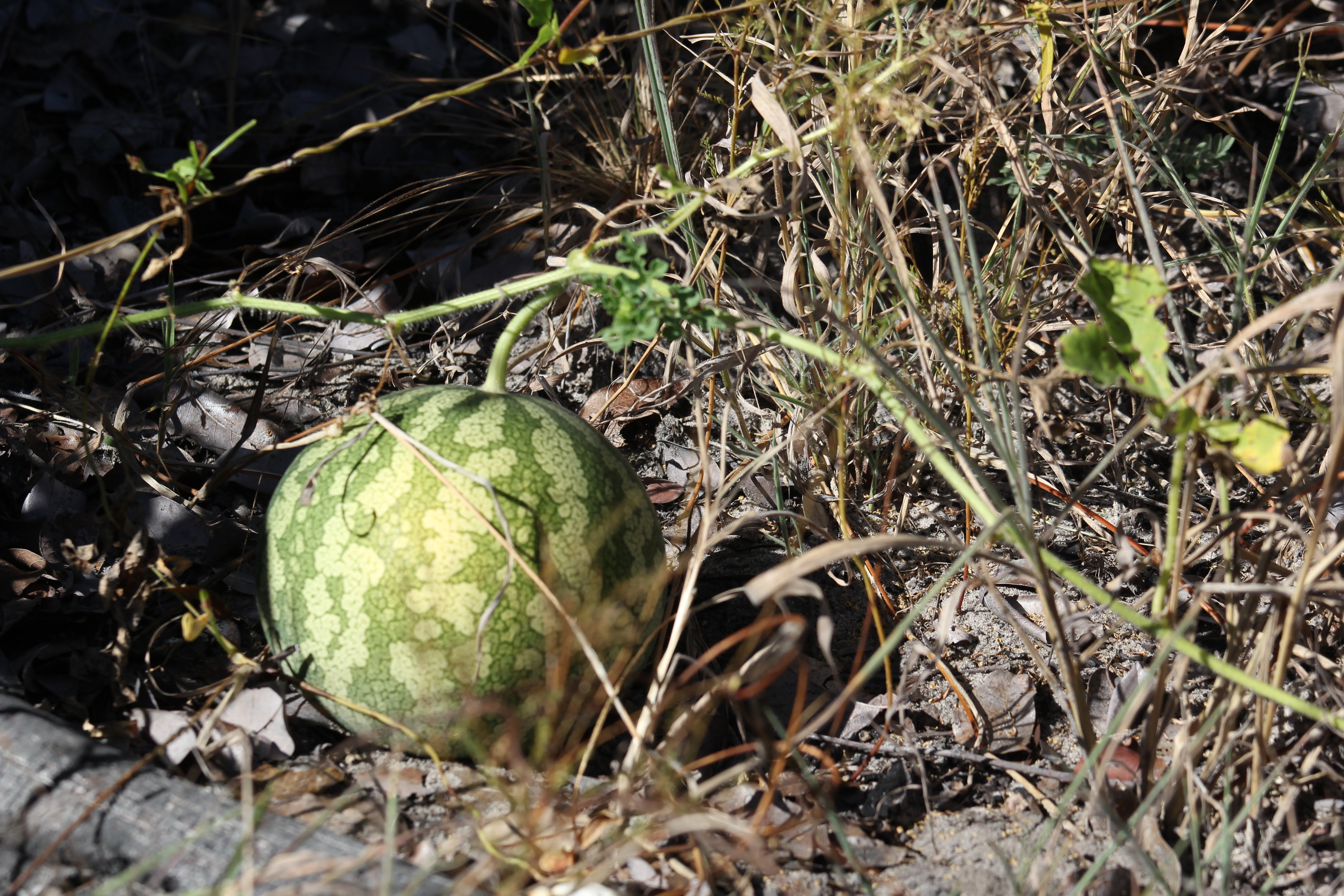

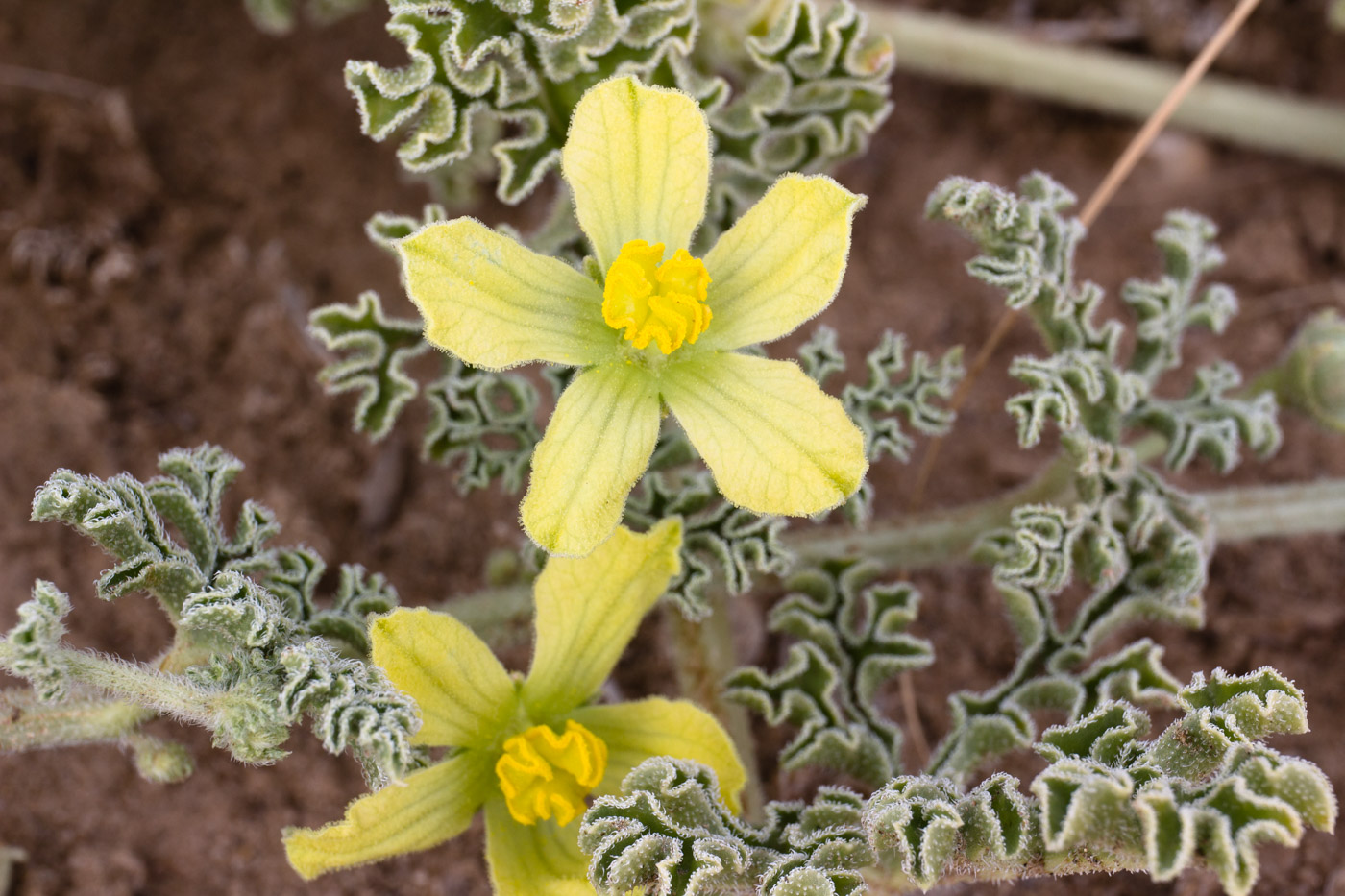

Scientific classification
- Kingdom: Plantae
- Clade: Embryophytes
- Clade: Tracheophytes
- Clade: Spermatophytes
- Clade: Angiosperms
- Clade: Eudicots
- Clade: Rosids
- Order: Cucurbitales
- Family: Cucurbitaceae
- Genus: Citrullus
- Species: C. ecirrhosus

Binomial name
- Citrullus ecirrhosus Cogn.

Synonyms
- Colocynthis ecirrhosus (Cogn.) Chakrav.

= Citrullus ecirrhosus =

Species of fruit and plant

Citrullus ecirrhosus, commonly known as Namib tsamma, is a species of perennial desert vine in the gourd family, Cucurbitaceae, and a relative of the widely consumed watermelon (Citrullus lanatus). It can be found in both Namibia and the Cape Provinces of South Africa, in particular the Namib Desert. It is the sister species to the bitter melon, Citrullus amarus with which it shares hard, white and bitter flesh.

The vines can crawl for up to two metres, and it has yellow flowers. As a desert plant, it is a hardy species, surviving with little water and strong sunlight. The leaves form annual stems which die back each year. The plant relies on water deep in the ground and morning fogs. It is an important source of water for numerous desert fauna. The bitter-tasting fruit it produces are known as tsamma melons.

== Distribution and habitat ==
The Namib tsamma is found in Succulent Karoo habitat in dry watercourses. It has a limited distribution in South Africa. Its range is from the Richtersveld up to the western Namib in Namibia.

== Cultivation ==
Experiments done by Simmons, Jarret, Cantrell, and Amnon in 2019 introduced the hybridisation of Citrullus ecirrhosus and Citrullus lanatus developed a cultivated watermelon capable of resistance to pests such as whiteflies (Bemisia tabaci). The hybrid developed whitefly resistance while still retaining traits of watermelon (Citrullus lanatus). While the hybrid did not offer total resistance, it was better protected than regular grown watermelons.

== Conservation status ==
In South Africa, the Namib tsamma is classified as least concern.

== Gallery ==
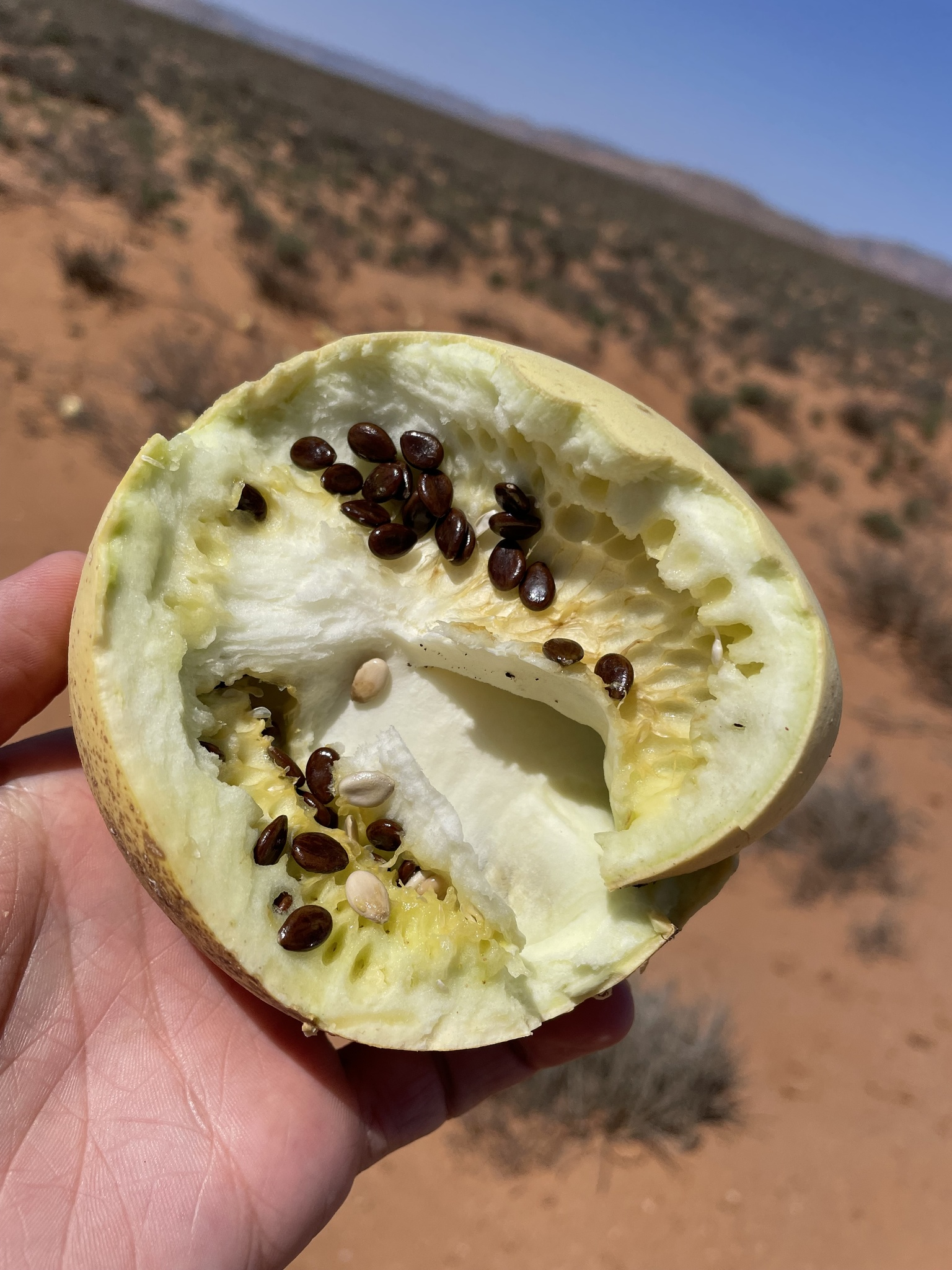
Seeds

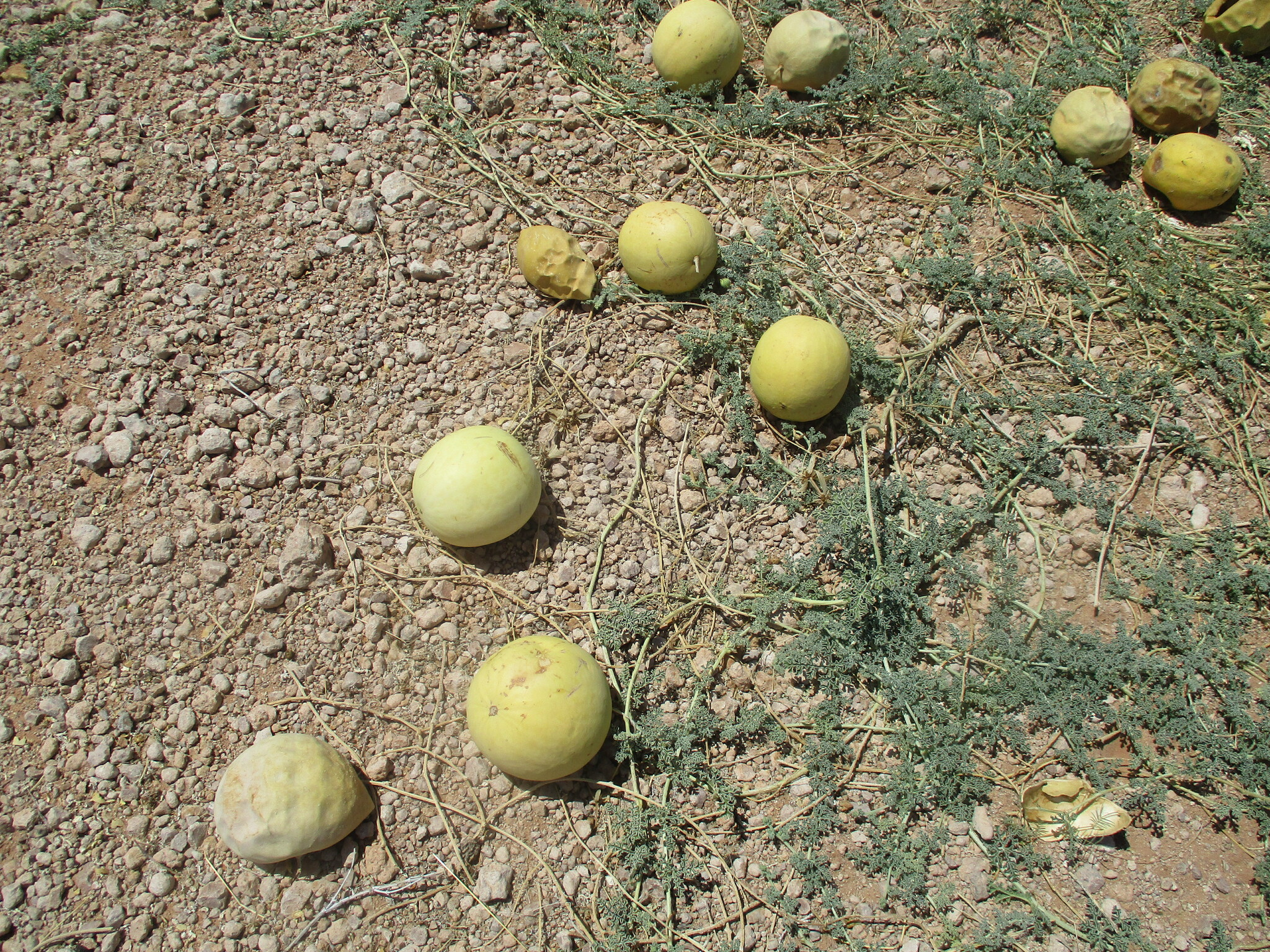
Ripening melons

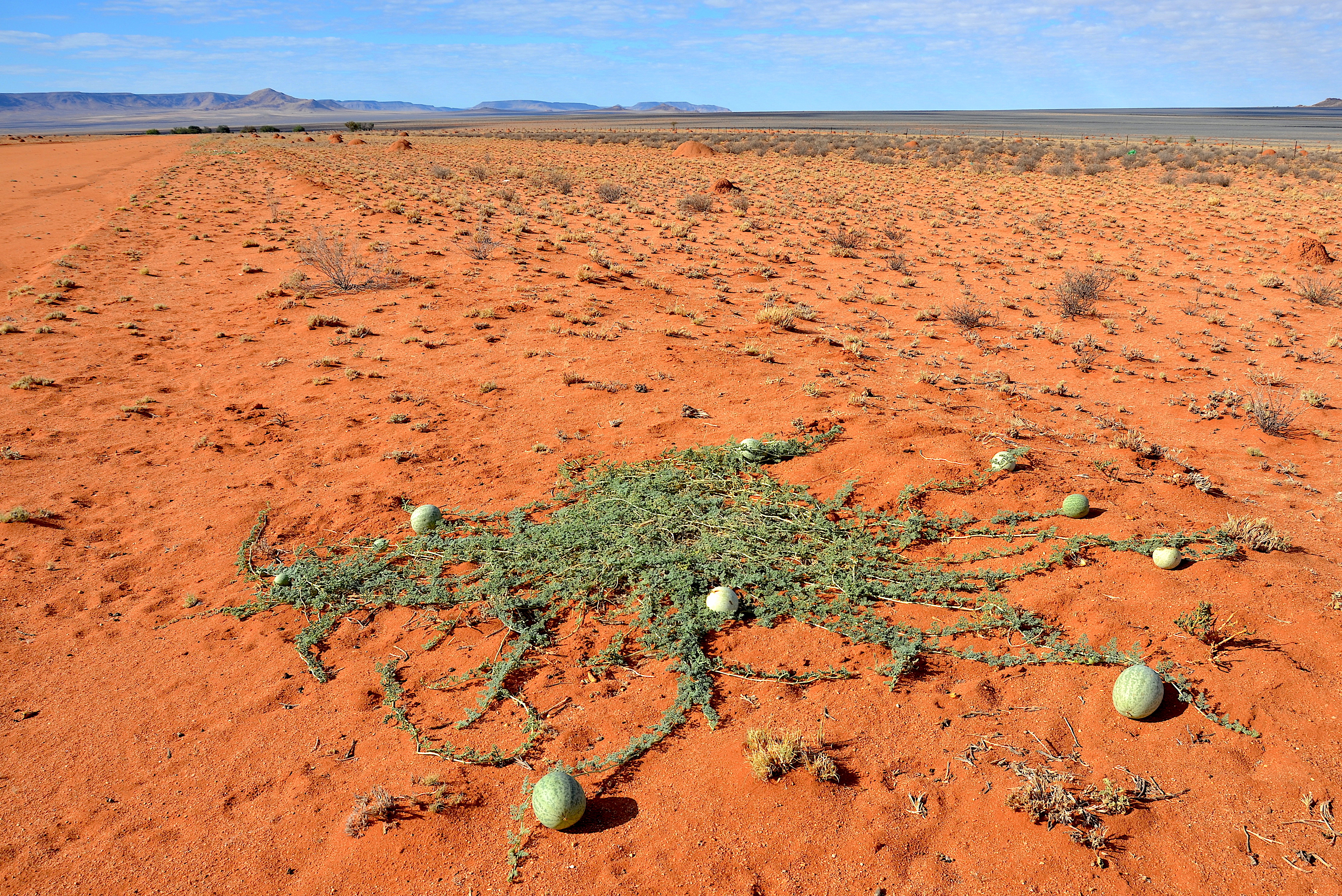
Tsamma melons in the Namib desert
