= Heinrich Schrader (botanist) =

German botanist and mycologist (1767–1836)

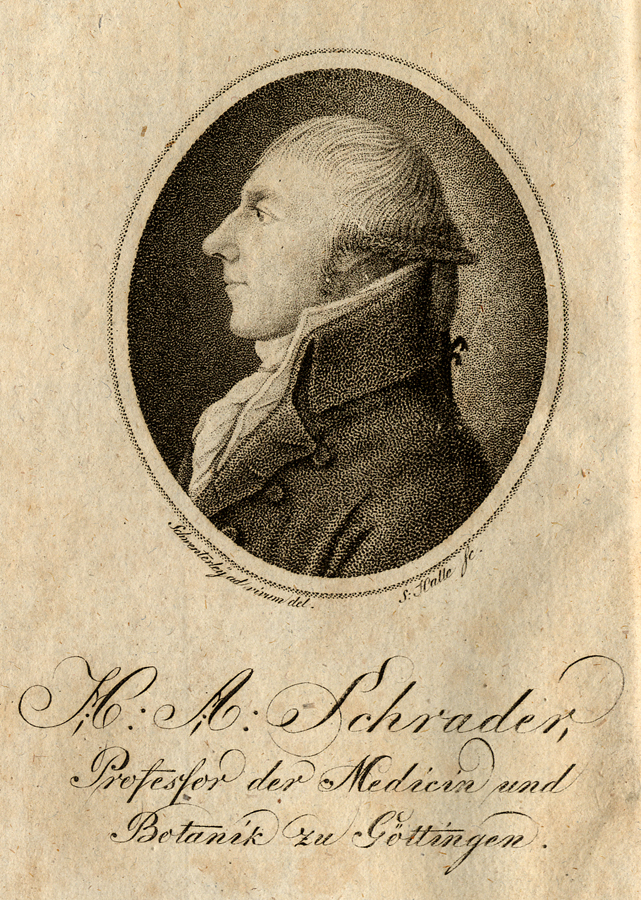
Heinrich Adolf Schrader

Heinrich Adolf Schrader (1 January 1767 in Alfeld near Hildesheim – 22 October 1836 in Göttingen) was a German botanist and mycologist. He studied medicine early in life. He named the Australian plant genus Hakea in 1797.

In 1795 he received his medical doctorate from the University of Göttingen, where in 1803 he became an associate professor to the medical faculty and director of the botanical garden. In 1809 he attained the title of "full professor" at Göttingen, where he taught classes until his retirement.

Among his better known publications are Nova genera plantarum (1797) and Flora germanica (1806). Schradere issued the exsiccata Systematische Sammlung cryptogamischer Gewächse (1896–1897). The plant genus Schraderanthus is named in his honour.

Schrader was elected a corresponding member of the Royal Swedish Academy of Sciences in 1815.

== See also ==
- Category:Taxa named by Heinrich Schrader (botanist)
